= Dragontrail =

Sheet glass by AGC Inc

Dragontrail is an alkali-aluminosilicate sheet glass manufactured by AGC Inc. It is engineered for a combination of thinness, lightness and damage-resistance, similarly to Corning's proprietary Gorilla Glass. The material's primary properties are its strength, allowing thin glass without fragility; its high scratch resistance; and its hardness – with a Vickers hardness test rating of 595 to 673.

== Cell phones and tablets ==
To date, some of the cell phone and tablet models that have incorporated Dragontrail protection are:

- Alcatel 7 (By Metro PCS)
- Alcatel Idol Alpha
- Alcatel Hero 2
- Alcatel One Touch Conquest
- Alcatel One Touch Idol 3
- Alcatel One Touch Idol 4 Pro
- Alcatel Tetra
- Alcatel TCL LX
- Allview P8 Energy mini
- Allview V2 Viper i
- Allview V1 Viper i4G
- Allview Viper E
- Allview W1i/W1s
- Allview X2 Soul Lite/X2 Soul Style/X2 Soul Style + Platinum
- BlackBerry DTEK 50/60
- BlackBerry Motion
- Bq Aquaris
- Cherry Mobile 4/S4/S4 Plus/G1
- Crosscall Trekker-S1
- Doro 8080
- Elephone P8000
- eSTAR X45
- Flipkart Billion Capture+
- Galaxy Nexus
- Getnord Onyx
- Gionee Marathon M5 lite
- Google Pixel 3a/3a XL
- Haier Esteem I70
- Highscreen Power Rage Evo
- i-mobile IQ 6
- InnJoo One
- InnJoo Two
- Kruger&Matz DRIVE 3
- Lava Iris 504q
- Lava Pixel V1
- Lava Pixel V2
- Lava X8
- Lava Agni 3 5G (2024)
- Lenovo K3 Note (Also known as Lenovo A7000 Turbo in India, Model Number: K50a40)
- Lenovo ThinkPad Yoga 12
- LYF WATER 5
- Meizu M2
- Meizu M2 note
- OnePlus Ace 2V/Nord 3 5G
- Oplus XonPhone 5
- Oukitel K10
- Philips Xenium I908
- Polytron Prime 7
- realme GT/GT Neo/GT Neo Flash
- realme GT Neo2T
- realme X7 Max
- Redmi 1S
- Redmi 2/2 Prime/2 Pro
- Samsung Galaxy J3 (2016)
- Samsung Galaxy M10, M20, M30s
- Samsung Galaxy On5, On7, On5 Pro, On7 Pro
- Sony Ericsson Xperia Active
- Sony Ericsson Xperia Acro S
- Sony Xperia X Performance
- Sony Xperia Z
- Sony Xperia Z1
- Sony Xperia Z2
- Sony Xperia Z3
- Sony Xperia Z5
- Sony Xperia Z5 Premium
- Stonex One
- TrekStor WinPhone 4.7 HD
- UMi Z
- V341U
- Videocon Krypton3 V50JG
- WE T1
- Wileyfox Spark/Spark+/SparkX
- Xiaomi Mi 2S
- XOLO 8X-1000
- XOLO BLACK 1X
- XOLO Q1000
- XOLO Q1010i
- XOLO Win Q900s
- ZTE Avid Plus
- ZTE Obsidian
- ZTE Sonata 2
