= Samsung Galaxy Stellar =

2012 smartphone model

Samsung Galaxy Stellar is an Android-based smartphone developed by Samsung Electronics. Released in 2012, it was marketed as an entry-level smartphone, designed for budget-conscious consumers. The smartphone was exclusive to Verizon Wireless in the United States, and featured 4G LTE connectivity, running on the Android 4.0 Ice Cream Sandwich operating system.

== Software ==
Samsung Galaxy Stellar was initially released with Android 4.0 Ice Cream Sandwich. It included Samsung's TouchWiz user interface, along with several Verizon-specific applications, including a suite of Amazon apps preinstalled. The device also featured two different user interface modes: Standard Mode, a traditional Android layout, and Starter Mode, a simplified UI intended to assist users unfamiliar with smartphones.

== Hardware ==
Samsung Galaxy Stellar featured a compact design, with dimensions measuring 121x63x12 mm and a weight of 133 g (4.69 oz). It had an 4.0-inch TFT capacitive touchscreen with a resolution of 480x800 pixels. The device was powered by a 1.2 GHz dual-core Qualcomm Snapdragon S4 Plus MSM8960 processor, accompanied by 1 GB of RAM. The device included 4 GB of internal storage, which can be expanded up to 32 GB via a microSD card. It was equipped with a removable 2100 mAh Li-Ion battery.

== Reception ==
The Samsung Galaxy Stellar was generally well received. It was noted for its design intended for ease of use, particularly with the 'Starter Mode' interface. However, it was criticized for its low-resolution camera and limited onboard storage, which constrained its usability for photo and media enthusiasts.

Reviewers from sources such as PhoneArena and CNET highlighted the device's affordability and Verizon's LTE network connectivity but pointed out its lackluster display quality and performance limitations.
