= Samsung Exhibit 4G =

Android smartphone developed by Samsung

- Manufacturer: Samsung Electronics
- Type: Touchscreen smartphone
- First released: June 2011
- Operating system: Android 2.3 "Gingerbread"
- CPU: Samsung Hummingbird S5PC110 (ARM Cortex A8), 1 GHz
- Memory: 512MB

The Samsung Exhibit 4G is an Android smartphone developed by Samsung that was released to the public on 22 June 2011. It was available from T-Mobile but has been discontinued.

== Features ==
- 3.5-inch display
- 3-megapixel rear-facing camera (no zoom) with VGA resolution front-facing camera
- Android 2.3 "Gingerbread" operating system
- Memory: 512 MB plus microSD card
- Dimensions: 4.67" x 2.33" x 0.46"
- Weight: 4.23 oz.
- Battery: 1500 mAh

The display does not have OLEDs or the damage-resistant "Gorilla Glass".

== Undocumented features ==
To capture an image of the screen, press "home" and the power button at the same time. The "Gallery" app shows screen images as a separate collection.

The user manual explains how to save an image for a contact icon, but it does not mention that contacts stored on the SIM card cannot have icons.

The user manual says that when the phone is powered down, you should hold the power button down until the Samsung logo appears. That time seems to vary, but you actually only have to hold the button down 6.5 seconds. It features TouchWiz 2.0. CyanogenMod ROMs have been developed for the device.

== See also ==
- Samsung Exhibit II
- Galaxy Nexus
- List of Android devices
