= TouchWiz =

Software overlay by Samsung Electronics

- TouchWiz Grace UX screenshot on a Galaxy Note 7
- Developer: Samsung Electronics
- Written in: C++
- OS family: Android (Linux), Bada, Tizen
- Working state: Discontinued
- Initial release: 2008; 18 years ago
- Final release: TouchWiz Grace UX (Android 6) / 2016
- Available in: 90+ languages (varies by carrier and/or country purchased)
- Supported platforms: ARMv6, ARMv7, ARMv8, x86
- Default user interface: Graphical
- License: Proprietary
- Preceded by: Croix UI
- Succeeded by: Samsung Experience
- Official website: www.samsung.com/uk/apps/

Support status
- Unsupported as of August 6, 2018; Google Play Services support dropped since July 2026

TouchWiz is a discontinued user interface developed by Samsung Electronics with partners, featuring a full touch user interface. It is sometimes incorrectly referred to as an operating system. TouchWiz was used internally by Samsung for smartphones, feature phones, and tablet computers, and was not available for licensing by external parties. The Android version of TouchWiz also comes with the Samsung-made app store Galaxy Apps. It was replaced by Samsung Experience in 2017 with the release of Android 7.0 "Nougat".

Samsung's approach to its TouchWiz UI was distinct from its Android version updates. While Android updates brought new features and improvements to the operating system, Samsung often customized its UI separately. This meant that even if two devices ran the same Android version, their TouchWiz UI could differ based on the device's release date and hardware capabilities.

For example, the Galaxy S5, released with Android 4.4.2 KitKat, had a version of TouchWiz tailored to its hardware and design. When upgraded to Android Marshmallow, it retained an older version of TouchWiz UI with minor tweaks. On the other hand, the Galaxy S7, which launched with Android Marshmallow, featured a newer version of TouchWiz designed for its advanced hardware and features.

Samsung's strategy was likely aimed at optimizing the user experience for each device rather than standardizing the UI across all models. This approach allowed them to differentiate their devices and ensure compatibility with specific hardware configurations. However, it also led to inconsistencies in the user experience across devices running the same Android version.

== History ==
=== Overview ===
The first, original edition of TouchWiz (version 1.0) was released in 2008. This 1.0 version was officially launched with the original Samsung Solstice in 2009.; although TouchWiz did first appear on the SGH-F480 Tocco in 2008. The last version of TouchWiz is TouchWiz Grace UX, which is on the Galaxy J1 mini prime LTE and the recalled Galaxy Note 7. TouchWiz Zero UX on the Galaxy J3 (2016) feature a more refined user interface as compared to the previous versions found on Samsung's older phones released prior to Galaxy S5's release. The status bar is now transparent during home screen mode in TouchWiz Nature UX 2.0 and TouchWiz Nature UX 2.5. In TouchWiz 4.0 on Galaxy S II and the Galaxy Note (both later updated to Nature UX), some of the features added include panning and tilt, which makes use of the accelerometer and gyroscope in the phone to detect motion.

TouchWiz is used by Samsung's own proprietary operating systems, Bada and REX, as well as by phones based on the Android operating system prior to Android 7. It is also present in phones running the Tizen operating system.

TouchWiz was succeeded by Samsung Experience in early 2017.

TouchWiz was a central issue in the lawsuit Apple Inc. v. Samsung Electronics.

=== TouchWiz 1.0 ===
This was the original edition of TouchWiz, released in 2008, with pre-introduction (trial) on the SGH-F480 (Tocco) phone. It was an evolution of the Croix user interface seen on the SGH-P520 (Armani) and SGH-F700 (Ultra Smart). TouchWiz version 1.0 was officially launched with the original SGH-A887 Solstice, a phone released on AT&T in the United States in 2009. Various versions of TouchWiz 1.0, with different features, were used on Solstice's siblings, such as the Eternity, Impression, Impact, and Highlight.

=== TouchWiz 2.0 ===
This was the original second edition of TouchWiz, released in 2009. This version premiered with the Solstice 2 in 2010.

=== TouchWiz 3.0 ===
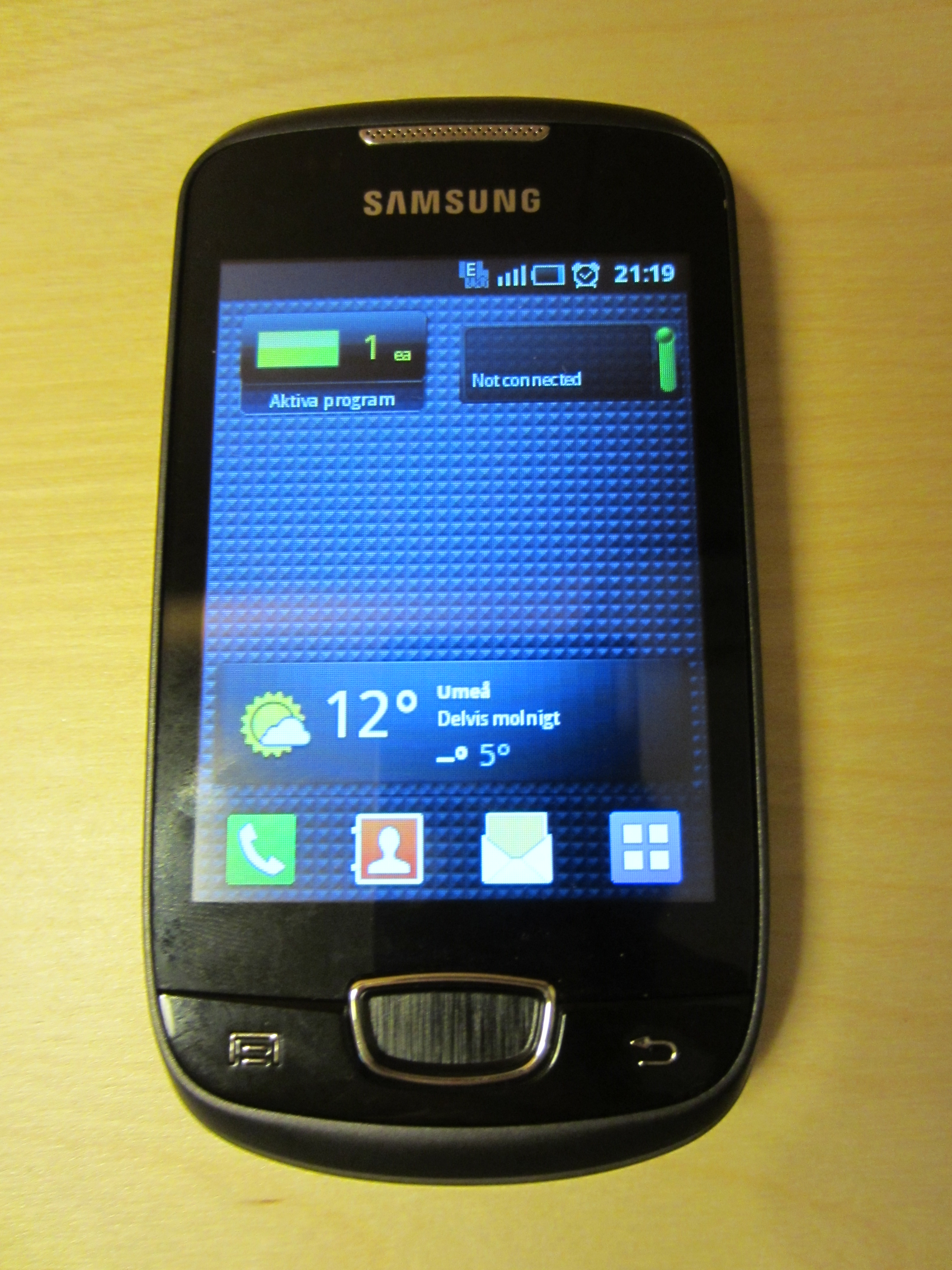
Galaxy Mini using TouchWiz 3.0

Released in 2010, to support Android Eclair (2.1) and Android Froyo (2.2). This version premiered with the Galaxy S. A lite version of TouchWiz 3.0, with reduced features, was used on the Galaxy Proclaim.

=== TouchWiz 4.0 ===
The second version of TouchWiz was released in 2011 to support Android Gingerbread and Android Honeycomb (2.3 - 3.2.6). The Galaxy S II was the first device preloaded with TouchWiz 4.0. This version includes better hardware acceleration than 3.0, as well as multiple touchscreen options involving multi-touch gestures and using the phone's accelerometer. One such feature allows users to place two fingers on the screen and tilt the device towards and away from themselves, to zoom in and out, respectively. "Panning" on TouchWiz 4.0 allows users to scroll through home screens by moving the device from side to side.

=== TouchWiz Nature UX ===
The third version of TouchWiz was renamed to TouchWiz Nature UX. It was released in 2012 and supported Android Ice Cream Sandwich (4.0) and Android Jelly Bean (4.1). The Galaxy S III, Galaxy Star, and Galaxy Note 10.1 were the first devices preloaded with this version, although a "lite" version was used beforehand on the Galaxy Tab 2 7.0. The 2013 Galaxy S2 "Plus" variant featured this user interface as well.

TouchWiz Nature UX contains more interactive elements than the previous version, such as a water ripple effect on the lock screen, and "smart stay", a feature that uses eye tracking technology to determine if the user is still watching the screen. Users are able to set custom vibration patterns for phone calls and notifications. The keyboard software is equipped with a clipboard manager. A multi-touch magnification feature and a picture-in-picture mode ("pop-up play") have also been added to the precluded video player, as well as panning and zooming motion gestures in the gallery software. To complement the TouchWiz interface, and as a response to Apple's Siri, this version introduced S Voice, Samsung's Virtual assistant.

The colour palette of the user interface has been adapted to the colours of nature, prosplit-screenen (plants, forest, grass) and blue (ocean, sky), to visually represent the slogan “Inspired by Nature”, and this version of TouchWiz also utilized many colour gradients and skeuomorphic elements. Together, they share many aspects of the design language and aesthetic Frutiger Aero.

Criticism has been aimed at the inability of the home screen and lock screen to work in horizontal display orientation.

==== Premium suite upgrade ====
With the Android 4.1 update (pre-installed on the Galaxy Note II), Samsung delivered a "premium suite upgrade", whose improvements include a split screen mode, making this the first mobile user interface to run more than one application simultaneously.

Other additions and accessibility improvements are "easy mode", a simplified home screen option with larger icons, "smart rotation", where the screen rotates after the orientation of the user's face detected through the front camera, a low-light shot mode, the ability to adjust the volume of each side of headphones separately, a "reader mode" for Samsung Internet (formerly known as "S Browser") with adjustable font size, "Page Buddy", which can detect the user's intended action such as opening the music player when plugging in earphones, and the ability to read the news feed from Facebook in particular directly from the lock screen well before common lock screen notifications were released with Android 5.0 "Lollipop".

=== TouchWiz Nature UX 2.0 ===
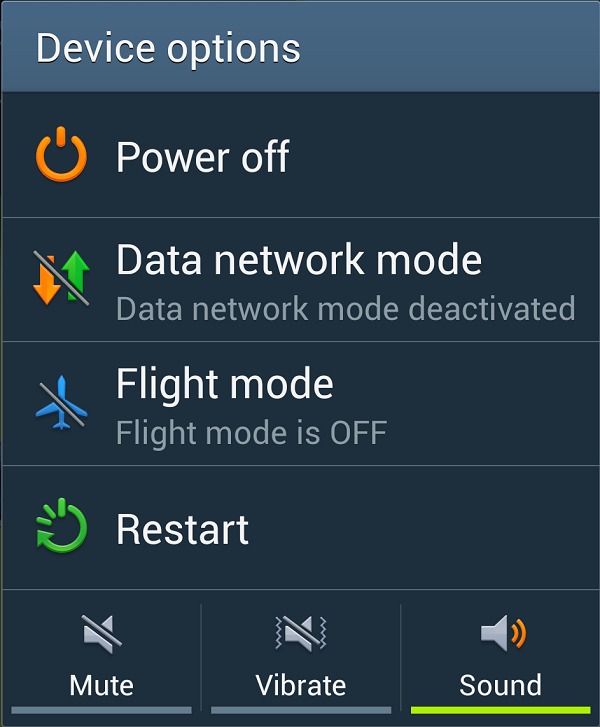
"Device options" menu of Samsung Mobile's TouchWiz user interface as of 2013, accessed by holding the power button for a second

A homescreen of TouchWiz Nature UX 2.0, on a Galaxy S4

This version supports Android Jelly Bean (4.2.2) and was released in 2013; the Galaxy S4 was the first device to use TouchWiz Nature UX 2.0. Even more eye-tracking abilities were introduced with this version, such as "smart scroll", which allows users to scroll down and up on webpages by tilting their head downwards and upwards, respectively.

The on-screen buttons for photo, video, and modes now have a metallic texture, and both photo and video recording modes are combined into one viewfinder page rather than separated by switching modes.

The audio setting (mute/vibrate/sound) is also accessible from the device options (power off / restart/data network mode/flight mode), which is accessed by holding the power button.

With Android KitKat, which rolled out in February 2014 to Samsung Galaxy devices, the colours of the green battery icon, as well as the green (upstream) and orange (downstream) indicator arrows in the top status bar, have been changed to grey.

=== TouchWiz Nature UX 2.5 ===
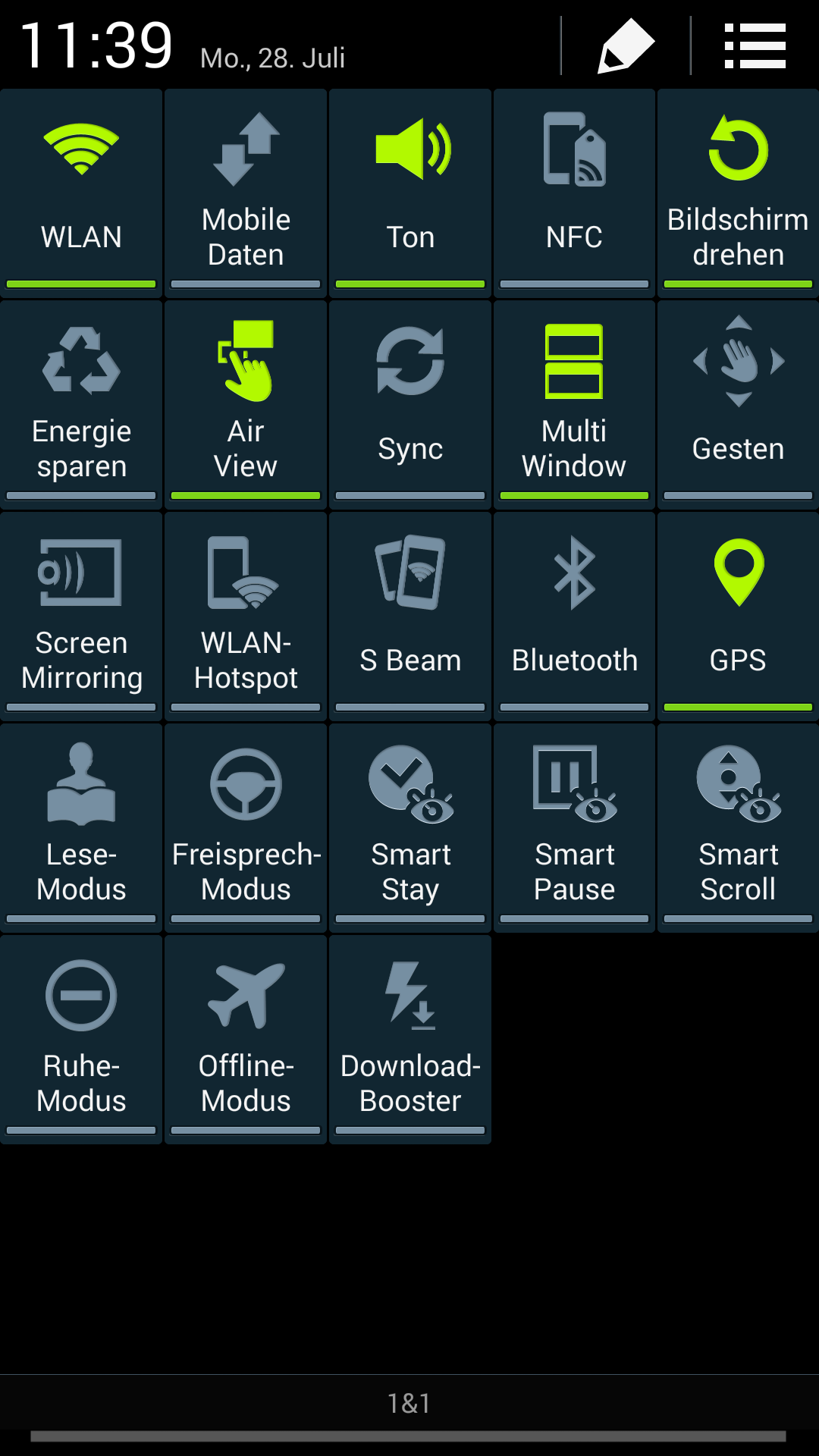
The control menu of the Galaxy Note 3 features 23 quick toggles. The "download booster" feature, initially featured on the Galaxy S5, was retrofitted with the Android 4.4.2 update.

TouchWiz Nature UX 2.5 was released in 2013 to support the last updates to Android Jelly Bean (4.1–4.3), and was first used on the Galaxy Note 3 and the Galaxy Note 10.1 2014 Edition. This version completely supports the Samsung Knox security solution, as well as multi-user capabilities. The camera was also improved in this update: shutter lag was reduced, and features like a 360° panorama mode were added. The settings menu is equipped with a new search feature.

It is the first mobile user interface to feature windowing. To the existing split-screen feature, the abilities to drag and drop items in between and open select apps twice was added.

A vertical one-handed operation mode has been added for the Galaxy Note 3. It can be accessed with a swiping gesture on either side of the screen and allows variably shrinking the simulated size of the screen. It also is equipped with on-screen navigation (options, home, back) and volume keys (up, down).

=== TouchWiz Nature UX 3.0 ===
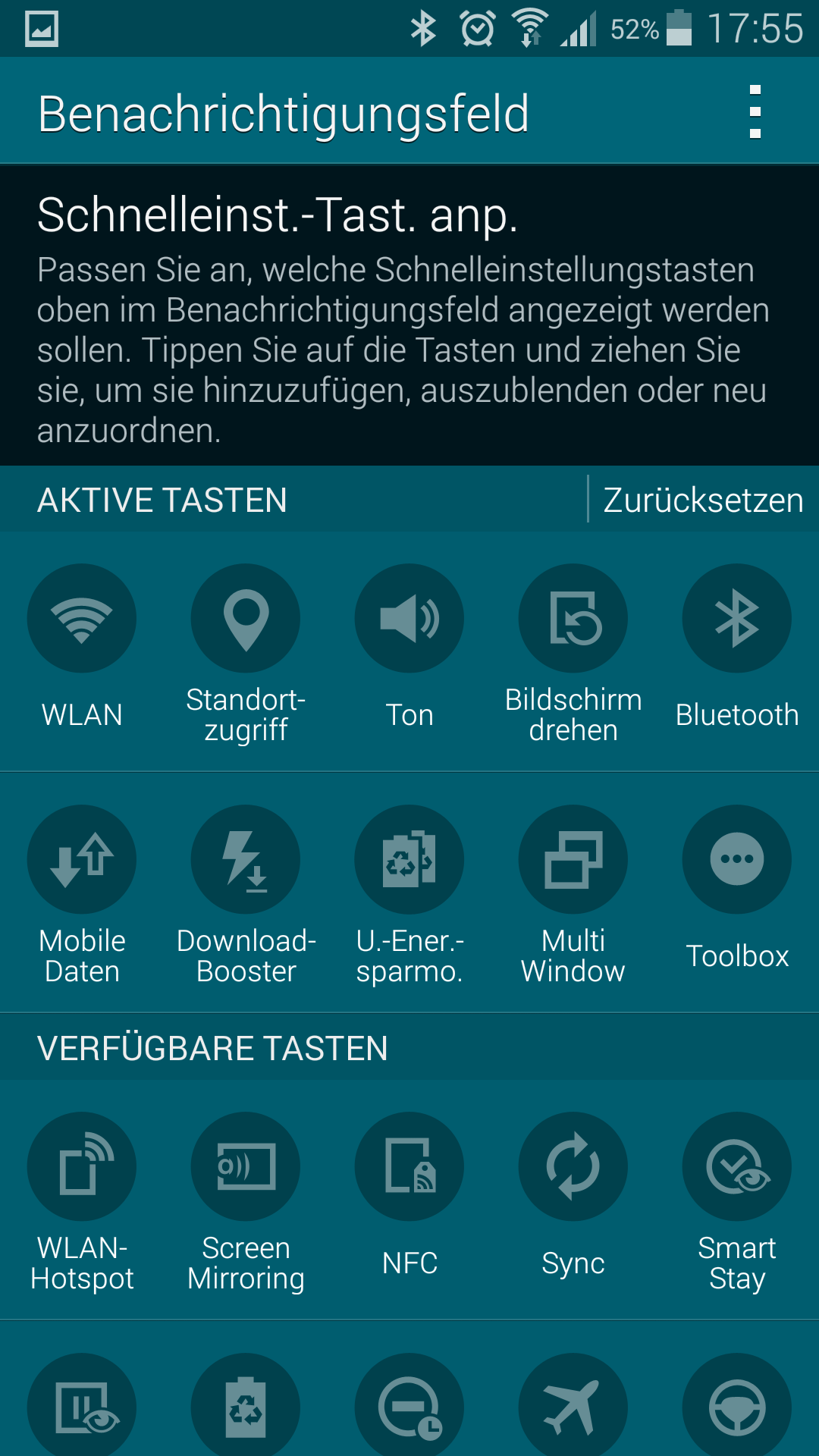
This menu allows changing the arrangement of the buttons. It appears on the Galaxy S5.

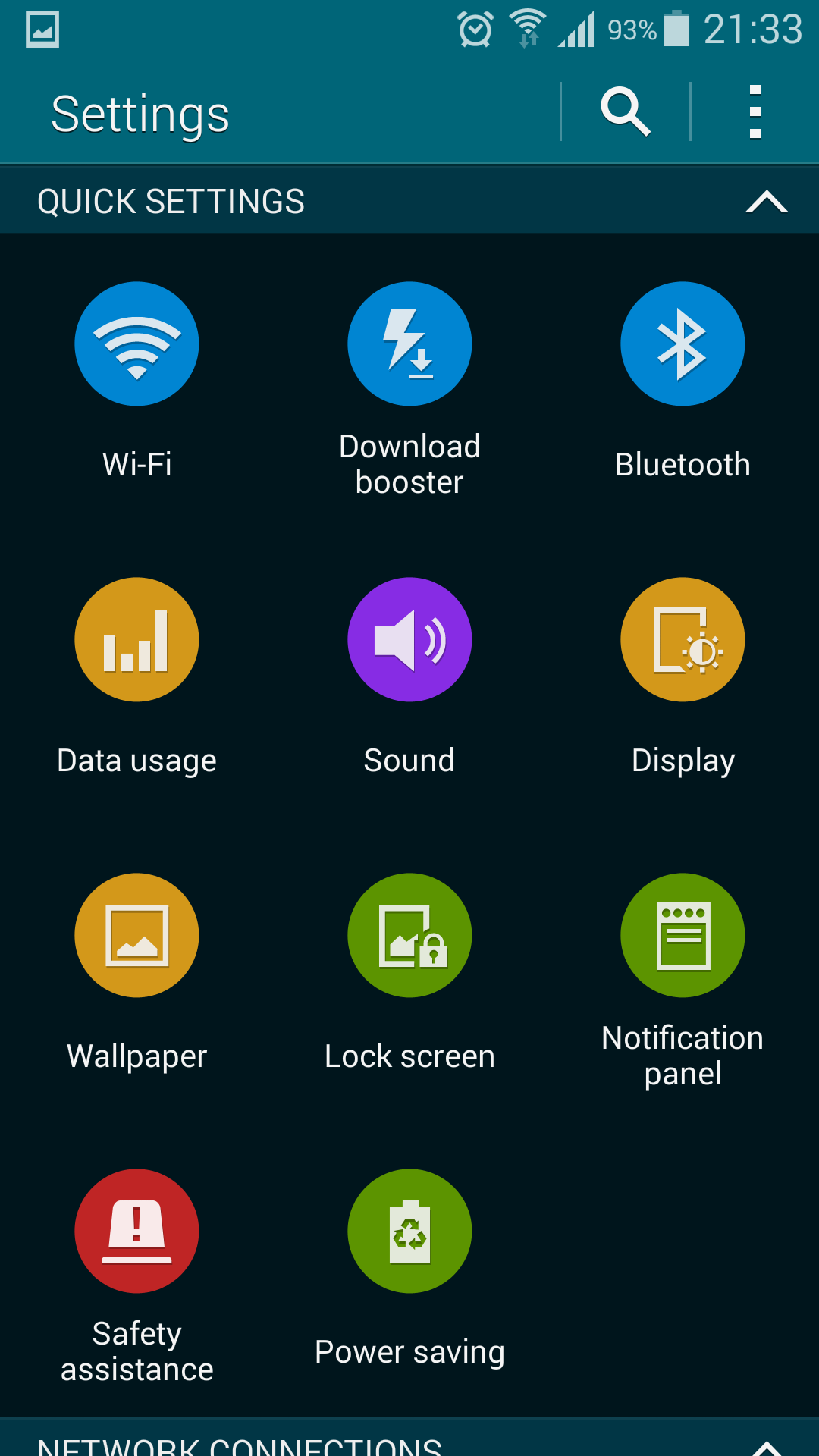
Redesigned settings menu on the Galaxy S5, in the "grid" view mode and with the changed, minimalistic icons

This update was released in 2014 to support Android KitKat (4.4). It was first seen on the Galaxy S5, Galaxy K Zoom and the Galaxy Note Pro 12.2. It later appeared on the Galaxy Alpha.

This update was the first version of Samsung's UI to be incompatible with the Galaxy S III and Note II even though these devices already received TouchWiz Nature UX 2.5.

The home screen and settings menu were made more user-friendly with larger icons and less clutter. Also, many skeuomorphic elements were changed for flat design variants, icons in the context menus were removed for minimalism, and any disabled options, where previously they would have been visible but unusable (Graphical widget), now do not show up at all.

The one-handed operation mode available on the Galaxy S5 allows setting shortcuts for apps and contacts. A floating menu with user-specified app shortcuts has also been added.

The new colour palette utilizes oceanic colours (e.g. #006578, #00151C, #004754, #009ba1, #005060, #0034da and #001d27) to reference the Galaxy S5's water resistance.

Some budget devices, such as the Galaxy Trend 2 Lite, Galaxy J1 Ace, Galaxy V Plus, Galaxy Grand Neo Plus and Galaxy Tab E feature a reduced version of TouchWiz Nature UX 3.0 called "TouchWiz Essence UX", which is adapted for devices with less than 1 GB of RAM. This version has an ultra-power-saving mode, which drastically extends the battery duration by making the screen grayscale, restricting the apps that can be used, and turning off features like Wi-Fi and Bluetooth.

The redesigned settings menu has flat icons instead of previously used self-coloured Clip art, and is equipped with three distinct viewing modes: Grid view, List view and Tab view. Tab view is like list view except the settings are separated by tabs instead of in one long list, similar to the settings on Nature UX 2.0 (S4 and Note 3).

Another minor distinction is that the boot screen shows the Android trademark, but no longer the Product of the device (e.g. SM-G900F, SM-G901F).

=== TouchWiz Nature UX 3.5 ===
This is a slightly modified version of TouchWiz Nature UX 3.0, released in 2014 for the Galaxy Note 4, Galaxy Note Edge and Galaxy A-series (2015). Most of the changes made were minor, aesthetic ones, including an overhaul of the cluttered settings menu, the inclusion of quick setting shortcuts, and centralization of the lock screen clock. However, the camera application was stripped down to its most basic features, removing features such as the Wi-Fi Direct-powered remote viewfinder, nonetheless gaining an AF/AE lock feature accessible through tapping and holding in the camera viewfinder.

The "grid view" setting menu viewing mode introduced in TouchWiz Nature UX 3.0 has been removed. Menus and system applications use white instead of dark backgrounds. The recent task switcher has changed into a vertically scrollable list with overlapping thumbnails, while a flat list with non-overlapping thumbnails with orientation-based scrolling direction had been used previously.

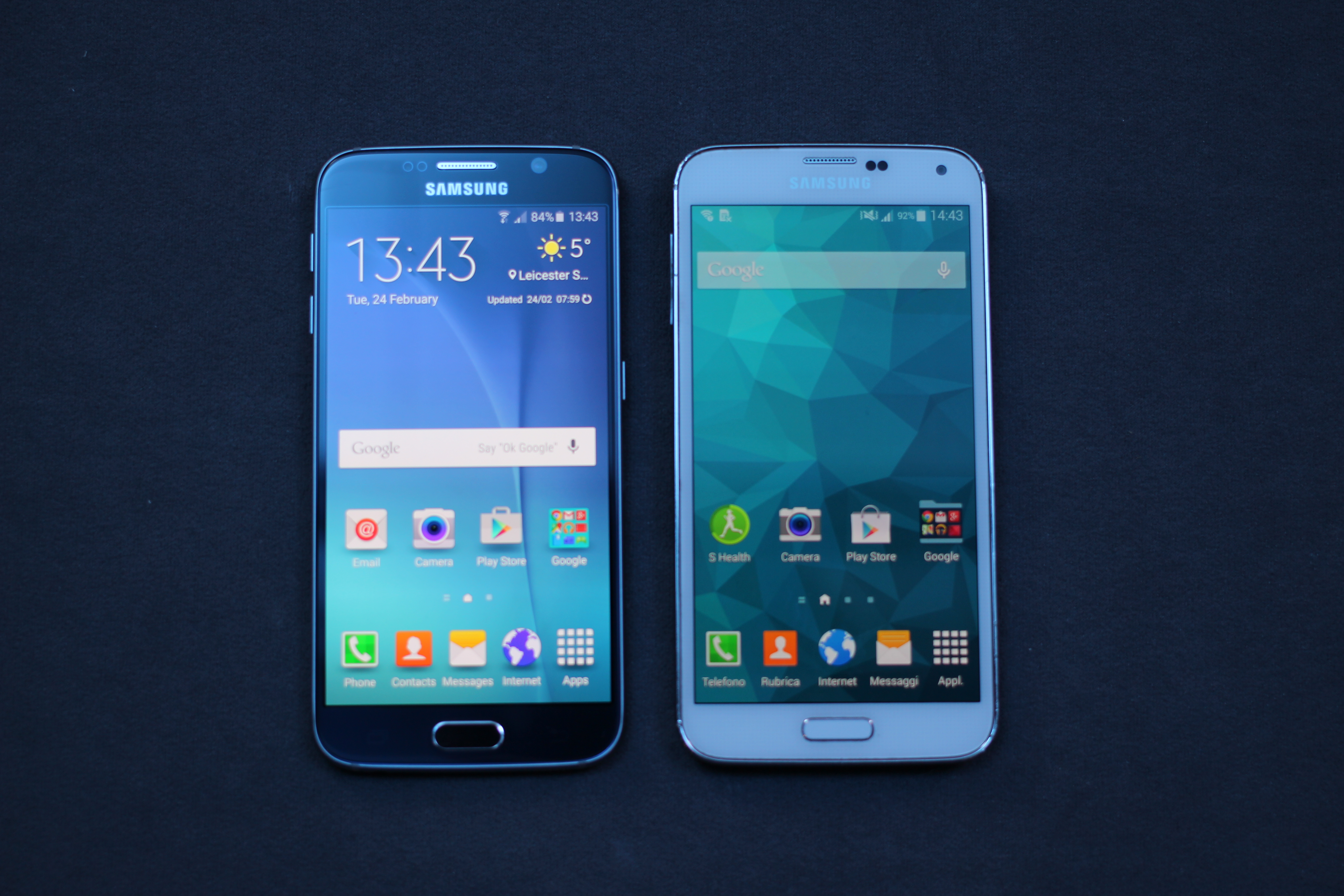
Galaxy S5 (right) and Galaxy S6 (left) with their TouchWiz home screen

The ability to use shortcuts for apps and contacts in the one-handed operation mode has been removed.

=== TouchWiz Nature UX 4.0 ===
Home screen in TouchWiz Nature UX 4.0 on Galaxy S4

This version supports Android Lollipop and was released in December 2014. It eventually became available to the Galaxy S4, Galaxy Note 3 (2013) and Galaxy S5 and Note 4 (2014), and other Lollipop-compatible devices.

This version of TouchWiz continued the design that was initially seen on the Galaxy S5, with slightly more rounded icons, but also incorporated Lollipop's additions and changes, such as making the notification drop-down menu merely an overlay instead of a full-screen drawer and colouring it neon blue. TouchWiz Nature UX 4.0 also included a visual overhaul for the whole system, changing the black background in system apps to a white theme, similar to TouchWiz Nature UX 3.5 seen on the Note 4 & A series. The black theme had been in place since the first Galaxy phone, because it reduced battery consumption as Samsung mainly uses AMOLED display technology. It was changed because of a patent licensing deal with Google, which required that the TouchWiz interface follow the design of "stock" Android more closely.

The size of the current video file and the remaining storage space amount is no longer indicated in the camera app viewfinder during video recording, and the audio controls (silent, vibration only, on) have been removed from the power menu.

=== TouchWiz Zero UX & TouchWiz Noble UX ===
Home screen of TouchWiz Noble UX on a Galaxy J3 (2016)

With TouchWiz Zero UX, Samsung changed to referring to versions as "codename UX" with the codename being one of the first flagship devices to feature the version. This version was released in 2015 with the introduction of the Galaxy S6 & S6 Edge and was named after their codename (Zero), and is based on Android 5.0 Lollipop. It also came with the Galaxy S5 Neo. This update cleaned up the user interface, reduced the number of duplicate functions, and used brighter and simpler colours with icon shadows. Many icons in top bars have been replaced with uppercase text labels such as "More".

An updated version named "TouchWiz Noble UX" was released in August 2015 alongside the Galaxy S6 Edge+ and the Galaxy Note 5. This version features updated iconography, with stock apps now featuring "squircle" icons instead of freeform, and a re-added single-handed operation mode that was removed on the Galaxy S6 after being available on the S5. However, it is opened with a triple-press of the home button instead of a swiping gesture, lacks on-screen keys (navigation, volume controls, app/contact shortcuts) and only has one fixed size.

The camera user interface has undergone several changes as well. Shortcuts on the left pane are no longer customizable, and the settings are on a separate page rather than on top of an active viewfinder.

Mid-range and entry-level devices feature a version named "TouchWiz Essence 2.0". It is similar to TouchWiz Zero UX but icon shadows are not included, along with or without Theme Support. It is comparatively lighter, faster, and features on devices such as the 2016 Galaxy A series, Galaxy A8, 2016 Galaxy Tab A series, and the Galaxy J series devices, which run Android Lollipop. It also doesn't feature the Sparkling Bubbles lock screen effect exclusive to the Galaxy S6 series and the Galaxy Note 5, which displays bubbles on the right and left edges of the screen.

Galaxy S6 user reports suggest The step-by-step frame navigation and still frame image extraction features have been removed from Samsung's included video player software.

=== TouchWiz Hero UX ===
Galaxy S5 Neo's TouchWiz Hero UX

This version of TouchWiz, codenamed after the Galaxy S7 (Hero), began during initial beta testing of Android 6.0 Marshmallow on the Galaxy S6 and Note 5 in December 2015, for users who had signed up for the beta program, and became formally available in February 2016 for the Galaxy S7 series. This version was also released for the S5.

It features a redesigned notification drop-down and color overhaul, replacing the original blue and green hue with white. This version also removed the weather while centering and enlarging the clock on the lock screen, as well as bringing back the ability to customize the shortcuts on the lock screen. Icons are slightly modified with a flatter look, removing the shadows that featured previously. The Smart Manager was removed as an app, and was moved to a settings option instead.

On this version, Samsung also added accessibility options such as Show button shapes, where buttons are outlined with a visible border and a shaded background to increase contrast from the background, and the ability to change the display density setting, although this was initially only accessible through a third-party app, as the setting was hidden by the system. An update to the Galaxy S7 and S7 Edge made it official, allowing users to change it under the display settings.

TouchWiz Hero UX also includes Google's additions to Android: Doze and App Standby to improve battery performance (although Samsung's app optimization feature remains available, thus meaning there are two separate "app optimization" settings: one within the Smart Manager app, and the other within the battery usage screen), Now on Tap to quickly access the virtual assistant Google Now, and Permission Control to limit the permissions granted to a particular application.

=== TouchWiz Grace UX ===
First released with the Galaxy Note 7 for Android Marshmallow and Android Nougat, the Grace UX was named after the device's codename and eventually made its way to older devices, including the Galaxy Note 5, through an update. The Grace UX features a cleaner, flatter look to iconography and extensive use of white space. TouchWiz Grace UX devices also benefit from the Secure Folder functionality. Replacing My Knox, Secure Folder enables users to keep certain data, and even apps, behind a secure password.

== Devices running Samsung TouchWiz ==
=== Samsung Mocha (Modular & Configurable Handset Software Architecture) ===
- Samsung Champ
- Samsung Impact/Highlight
- Samsung Jet
- Samsung Preston
- Samsung Solstice
- Samsung Corby
- Samsung Star
- Samsung Tocco
- Samsung Ultra Touch
- Samsung Blue Earth
- Samsung Monte

=== Bada ===
- Samsung Wave 575 (TouchWiz 3.0)
- Samsung Wave S8500
- Samsung Wave II S8530
- Samsung Wave 723 (TouchWiz 3.0)
- Samsung Wave 525 (TouchWiz 3.0)
- Samsung Wave Y
- Samsung Wave 3 (TouchWiz 4.0)

=== Windows Mobile ===
- Samsung Omnia II

=== Symbian ===
- Samsung i8910

=== Tizen ===
- Samsung Z1
- Samsung Z2
- Samsung Z3
- Samsung Z4

=== Android ===
==== Cameras ====
- Galaxy Camera (TouchWiz Nature UX)
- Galaxy NX (TouchWiz Nature UX 2.0)
- Galaxy Camera 2 (TouchWiz Nature UX 2.5)

==== Smartphones ====
Series	Device	Original version	Current version
Behold	Behold II	TouchWiz (Android 1.5)	TouchWiz (Android 1.6)
Droid	Droid Charge	TouchWiz 3.0 (Android 2.2.1)	TouchWiz 4.0 (Android 2.3.6)
Exhibit	Exhibit 4G	TouchWiz 3.0 (Android 2.3.3)	
Exhibit	Exhibit II 4G	TouchWiz 4.0 (Android 2.3.5)	
Galaxy	Galaxy 3	TouchWiz 3.0 (Android 2.1)	TouchWiz 3.0 (Android 2.2)
Galaxy	Galaxy 5	TouchWiz 3.0 (Android 2.1)	TouchWiz 3.0 (Android 2.2)
Galaxy	Galaxy Active Neo	TouchWiz Noble UX (Android 5.1.1)	
Galaxy	Galaxy Alpha	TouchWiz Nature UX 3.0 (Android 4.4.4)	TouchWiz Nature UX 3.0 (Android 4.4.4) - SM-G8508S; TouchWiz Nature UX 4.0 (Android 5.0.2)
Galaxy	Galaxy Avant	TouchWiz Nature UX 3.0 (Android 4.4.4)	
Galaxy	Galaxy Chat	TouchWiz Nature UX (4.0.4)	TouchWiz Nature UX 2.5 (4.1.2)
Galaxy	Galaxy Fame	TouchWiz Nature UX 2.5 (Android 4.1.2)	
Galaxy	Galaxy Fit	TouchWiz 3.0 (Android 2.2)	TouchWiz 3.0 (Android 2.3)
Galaxy	Galaxy Gio	TouchWiz 3.0 (Android 2.2)	TouchWiz 3.0 (Android 2.3.6)
Galaxy	Galaxy J	TouchWiz Nature UX 2.5 (Android 4.3)	TouchWiz Zero UX (Android 5.0)
Galaxy	Galaxy K Zoom	TouchWiz Nature UX 3.0 (Android 4.4.2)	
Galaxy	Galaxy Light	TouchWiz Nature UX 2.0 (Android 4.2.2)	
Galaxy	Galaxy Mega 5.8	TouchWiz Nature UX 2.0 (Android 4.2.2)	TouchWiz Nature UX 2.5 (Android 4.4.2)
Galaxy	Galaxy Mega 6.3	TouchWiz Nature UX 2.0 (Android 4.2.2)	TouchWiz Nature UX 2.5 (Android 4.4.2)
Galaxy	Galaxy Mega 2	TouchWiz Nature UX 3.0 (Android 4.4.4)	TouchWiz Nature UX 3.0 (Android 4.4.4); TouchWiz Noble UX (Android 5.1.1) (AT&T)
Galaxy	Galaxy Mini	TouchWiz 3.0 (Android 2.2.1)	TouchWiz 3.0 (Android 2.3.6)
Galaxy	Galaxy Mini 2	TouchWiz 4.0 (Android 2.3.6)	
Galaxy	Galaxy Pocket / Pocket Duos	TouchWiz 3.0 (Android 2.3.6)	
Galaxy	Galaxy Pocket Plus	TouchWiz Nature UX (Android 4.0.4)	
Galaxy	Galaxy Pocket 2	TouchWiz Essence UX (Android 4.4.2)	
Galaxy	Galaxy Pocket Neo	TouchWiz Nature UX 2.0 (Android 4.1.2)	
Galaxy	Galaxy Premier	TouchWiz Nature UX 2.0 (Android 4.1.1)	
Galaxy	Galaxy Prevail 2 / Ring	TouchWiz Nature UX 2.0 (Android 4.1.2)	
Galaxy	Galaxy Pro	TouchWiz 3.0 (Android 2.2.2/2.3.6)	
Galaxy	Galaxy Proclaim	TouchWiz 3.0 Lite (Android 2.3)	
Galaxy	Galaxy R / Z	TouchWiz 4.0 (Android 2.3.4)	TouchWiz Nature UX (Android 4.0.4)
Galaxy	Galaxy R Style	TouchWiz Nature UX (Android 4.0.3)	TouchWiz Nature UX 2.0 (Android 4.1.2)
Galaxy	Galaxy Round	TouchWiz Nature UX (Android 4.3)	TouchWiz Nature UX 3.0 (Android 4.4.2)
Galaxy	Galaxy Rugby Pro	TouchWiz Nature UX (Android 4.0.4)	
Galaxy	Galaxy Star / Star Pro	TouchWiz Nature UX (Android 4.1.2)	
Galaxy	Galaxy Star 2 / Star 2 Plus / Star Advance	TouchWiz Essence UX (Android 4.4.2)	
Galaxy	Galaxy V	TouchWiz Essence UX (Android 4.4.2)	
Galaxy	Galaxy V Plus	TouchWiz Essence UX (Android 4.4.4)	
Galaxy	Galaxy W	TouchWiz 4.0 (Android 2.3.5)	
Galaxy	Galaxy Y / Y Duos / Y Pro	TouchWiz 4.0 (Android 2.3.6)	
Galaxy	Galaxy Y Plus	TouchWiz Nature UX (Android 4.0)	
Galaxy	Galaxy Young	TouchWiz Nature UX 2.0 (Android 4.1.2)	
Galaxy	Galaxy Young 2	TouchWiz Essence UX 3.0 (Android 4.4.2)	
Galaxy A	Galaxy A3	TouchWiz Nature UX 3.5 (4.4.4)	TouchWiz Hero UX (Android 6.0.1)
Galaxy A	Galaxy A5	TouchWiz Nature UX 3.5 (4.4.4)	TouchWiz Hero UX (Android 6.0.1)
Galaxy A	Galaxy A7	TouchWiz Nature UX 3.5 (4.4.4)	TouchWiz Hero UX (Android 6.0.1)
Galaxy A	Galaxy A8	TouchWiz Noble UX (5.1.1)	TouchWiz Hero UX (Android 6.0.1)
Galaxy A	Galaxy A3 (2016)	TouchWiz Noble UX (5.1.1)	Samsung Experience 8.0 (Android 7.0)
Galaxy A	Galaxy A5 (2016)	TouchWiz Noble UX (5.1.1)	Samsung Experience 8.5 (Android 7.1.1)
Galaxy A	Galaxy A7 (2016)	TouchWiz Noble UX (5.1.1)	Samsung Experience 8.5 (Android 7.1.1)
Galaxy A	Galaxy A8 (2016)	TouchWiz Grace UX (6.0.1)	Samsung Experience 9.0 (Android 8.0)
Galaxy A	Galaxy A9 (2016)	TouchWiz Noble UX (5.1.1)	TouchWiz Grace UX (Android 6.0.1)
Galaxy A	Galaxy A9 Pro (2016)	TouchWiz Hero UX (6.0.1)	Samsung Experience 9.0 (Android 8.0)
Galaxy A	Galaxy A3 (2017)	TouchWiz Grace UX (Android 6.0.1)	Samsung Experience 9.0 (Android 8.0)
Galaxy A	Galaxy A5 (2017)	TouchWiz Grace UX (Android 6.0.1)	Samsung Experience 9.0 (Android 8.0)
Galaxy A	Galaxy A7 (2017)	TouchWiz Grace UX (Android 6.0.1)	Samsung Experience 9.0 (Android 8.0)
Galaxy Ace	Galaxy Ace	TouchWiz 3.0 (Android 2.3.6)	
Galaxy Ace	Galaxy Ace Plus	TouchWiz 4.0 (Android 2.3.6)	
Galaxy Ace	Galaxy Ace 2	TouchWiz 4.0 (Android 2.3.6)	TouchWiz Nature UX 2.0 (Android 4.1.2)
Galaxy Ace	Galaxy Ace 3	TouchWiz Nature UX 2.0/2.5 (Android 4.1.2/4.2.2/4.3)	
Galaxy Ace	Galaxy Ace Style	TouchWiz Essence UX (Android 4.4.2) - SM-G357M; TouchWiz Essence UX (Android 4.4.4) - SM-G357FZ	
Galaxy Ace	Galaxy Ace Style (LTE)	TouchWiz Essence UX (Android 4.4.2)	
Galaxy Ace	Galaxy Ace 4 / Ace 4 Lite	TouchWiz Nature UX 2.5 (Android 4.3) - SM-G3139D; TouchWiz Essence UX (Android 4.4.2)	
Galaxy Ace	Galaxy Ace 4 Neo	TouchWiz Essence UX (Android 4.4.4)	
Galaxy C	Galaxy C5	TouchWiz Hero UX (Android 6.0.1)	Samsung Experience 9.0 (Android 8.0)
Galaxy C	Galaxy C7	TouchWiz Hero UX (Android 6.0.1)	Samsung Experience 9.0 (Android 8.0)
Galaxy C	Galaxy C5 Pro	TouchWiz Grace UX (Android 6.0.1)	Samsung Experience 9.0 (Android 8.0)
Galaxy C	Galaxy C7 Pro	TouchWiz Grace UX (Android 6.0.1)	Samsung Experience 9.0 (Android 8.0)
Galaxy C	Galaxy C9 Pro	TouchWiz Grace UX (Android 6.0.1)	Samsung Experience 9.0 (Android 8.0)
Galaxy Core	Galaxy Core	TouchWiz Nature UX 2.0 (Android 4.1.2)	
Galaxy Core	Galaxy Core Plus	TouchWiz Nature UX 2.0 (Android 4.2.2) TouchWiz Nature UX 2.0 (Android 4.3) - SM-G3502L	
Galaxy Core	Galaxy Core Advance	TouchWiz Nature UX 2.5 (Android 4.2.2)	
Galaxy Core	Galaxy Core LTE	TouchWiz Nature UX 2.0 (Android 4.2.2); TouchWiz Nature UX 2.0 (Android 4.3) - SM-G5318	
Galaxy Core	Galaxy Core LTE (Canada)	TouchWiz Nature UX 3.0 (Android 4.4.2)	
Galaxy Core	Galaxy Core Prime / Win 2	TouchWiz Nature UX 3.0 (Android 4.4.4); TouchWiz Nature UX 4.0 (Android 5.1.1) - SM-G360T, SM-G360T1	TouchWiz Nature UX 3.0 (Android 4.4.4); TouchWiz Nature UX 4.0 (Android 5.0.2) - SM-G360BT, SM-G360F, SM-G360FY, SM-G360M; TouchWiz Nature UX 4.0 (Android 5.1.1) - SM-G360G, SM-G360GY, SM-G360T, SM-G360T1
Galaxy Core	Galaxy Core Prime VE	TouchWiz Noble UX (Android 5.1.1)	
Galaxy Core	Galaxy Core Lite 4G	TouchWiz Nature UX 2.0 (Android 4.3); TouchWiz Essence UX (Android 4.4.2) - SM-G3589W	
Galaxy Core	Galaxy Core 2	TouchWiz Essence UX (Android 4.4.2)	
Galaxy E	Galaxy E5	TouchWiz Nature UX 3.5 (Android 4.4.4)	TouchWiz Noble UX (Android 5.1.1)
Galaxy E	Galaxy E7	TouchWiz Nature UX 3.5 (Android 4.4.4)	TouchWiz Noble UX (Android 5.1.1)
Galaxy Express	Galaxy Express	TouchWiz Nature UX 2.5 (Android 4.2.2)	TouchWiz Nature UX 3.0 (Android 4.4.2)
Galaxy Express	Galaxy Express 2	TouchWiz Nature UX 2.5 (Android 4.2.2)	TouchWiz Nature UX 3.0 (Android 4.4.2)
Galaxy Express	Galaxy Express 3	TouchWiz Noble UX (Android 5.1.1)	
Galaxy Express	Galaxy Express Prime	TouchWiz Noble UX (Android 5.1.1)	
Galaxy Grand	Galaxy Grand	TouchWiz Nature UX (Android 4.1.2)	TouchWiz Nature UX 2.0 (Android 4.2.2)
Galaxy Grand	Galaxy Grand Quattro / Galaxy Win	TouchWiz Nature UX 2.0 (Android 4.2.2)	TouchWiz Nature UX 3.0 (Android 4.4)
Galaxy Grand	Galaxy Grand Neo / Grand Lite	TouchWiz Nature UX 2.0 (Android 4.2.2); TouchWiz Nature UX 3.0 (Android 4.4.4) - GT-I9060C	
Galaxy Grand	Galaxy Grand Neo Plus	TouchWiz Nature UX 3.0 (Android 4.4.4)	
Galaxy Grand	Galaxy Grand 2	TouchWiz Nature UX 2.5 (Android 4.3)	TouchWiz Nature UX 2.5 (Android 4.3); TouchWiz Nature UX 3.0 (4.4.2) - SM-G7102, SM-G7105, SM-G7105H, SM-G7105L; TouchWiz Nature UX 3.0 (4.4.4) - SM-G710K, SM-G710L, SM-G710S
Galaxy Grand	Galaxy Grand Prime / Grand Max	TouchWiz Nature UX 3.0 (Android 4.4.4)	TouchWiz Noble UX (Android 5.1.1)
Galaxy Grand	Galaxy Grand Prime (2016) / Grand Prime Plus	TouchWiz Grace UX (Android 6.0.1)	
Galaxy J	Galaxy J1	TouchWiz Essence UX (Android 4.4.4) TouchWiz Zero UX (Android 5.0.2) - Verizon	TouchWiz Essence UX (Android 4.4.4) TouchWiz Noble UX (Android 5.1.1) - Verizon
Galaxy J	Galaxy J1 Ace	TouchWiz Essence UX (Android 4.4.4)	
Galaxy J	Galaxy J1 Ace Neo / J1 Ace VE	TouchWiz Noble UX (Android 5.1.1)	TouchWiz Noble UX (Android 5.1.1)
Galaxy J	Galaxy J2	TouchWiz Noble UX (Android 5.1.1)	TouchWiz Noble UX (Android 5.1.1)
Galaxy J	Galaxy J5	TouchWiz Noble UX (Android 5.1.1)	TouchWiz Hero UX (Android 6.0.1)
Galaxy J	Galaxy J7	TouchWiz Noble UX (Android 5.1.1)	TouchWiz Hero UX (Android 6.0.1)
Galaxy J	Galaxy J1 (2016)	TouchWiz Noble UX (Android 5.1.1) TouchWiz Hero UX (Android 6.0.1) - SM-J120W	
Galaxy J	Galaxy J1 mini / J1 Nxt	TouchWiz Noble UX (Android 5.1.1)	
Galaxy J	Galaxy J1 mini Prime / Galaxy V2 (3G)	TouchWiz Noble UX (Android 5.1.1)	
Galaxy J	Galaxy J1 mini Prime (LTE)	TouchWiz Hero UX (6.0.1)	
Galaxy J	Galaxy J2 (2016)	TouchWiz Hero UX (6.0.1)	
Galaxy J	Galaxy J3 (2016)	TouchWiz Noble UX (Android 5.1.1); TouchWiz Hero UX (Android 6.0.1) - SM-J320N0, SM-J320R4, SM-J320W8	TouchWiz Noble UX (Android 5.1.1); TouchWiz Hero UX (Android 6.0.1) - SM-J320N0, SM-J320R4; Samsung Experience 8.5 (Android 7.1.1) - SM-J320W8
Galaxy J	Galaxy J3 Pro	TouchWiz Noble UX (Android 5.1.1)	
Galaxy J	Galaxy J5 (2016)	TouchWiz Hero UX (Android 6.0.1)	Samsung Experience 9.0/9.5 (Android 8.0/8.1)
Galaxy J	Galaxy J7 (2016)	TouchWiz Hero UX (Android 6.0.1)	Samsung Experience 9.5 (Android 8.1)
Galaxy J	Galaxy J2 Prime / J2 Ace	TouchWiz Grace UX (Android 6.0.1)	
Galaxy J	Galaxy J3 Emerge	TouchWiz Grace UX (Android 6.0.1)	
Galaxy J	Galaxy J5 Prime	TouchWiz Hero UX (Android 6.0.1)	Samsung Experience 9.0 (Android 8.0)
Galaxy J	Galaxy J7 Prime	TouchWiz Hero UX (Android 6.0.1)	Samsung Experience 9.0 (Android 8.0)
Galaxy Note	Galaxy Note	TouchWiz 4.0 (Android 2.3.3)	TouchWiz Nature UX (Android 4.1.2)
Galaxy Note	Galaxy Note II	TouchWiz Nature UX (Android 4.1.1)	TouchWiz Nature UX 2.5 (Android 4.4.2)
Galaxy Note	Galaxy Note 3	TouchWiz Nature UX 2.5 (Android 4.3/4.4.2)	TouchWiz Nature UX 4.0 (Android 5.0)
Galaxy Note	Galaxy Note 3 Neo	TouchWiz Nature UX 2.5 (Android 4.3)	TouchWiz Nature UX 4.0 (Android 5.1.1)
Galaxy Note	Galaxy Note 4	TouchWiz Nature UX 3.5 (Android 4.4.4)	TouchWiz Hero UX (Android 6.0.1)
Galaxy Note	Galaxy Note Edge	TouchWiz Nature UX 3.5 (Android 4.4.4)	TouchWiz Hero UX (Android 6.0.1)
Galaxy Note	Galaxy Note 5	TouchWiz Noble UX (Android 5.1.1)	Samsung Experience 8.0 (Android 7.0)
Galaxy Note	Galaxy Note 7	TouchWiz Grace UX (Android 6.0.1)	
Galaxy On	Galaxy On5	TouchWiz Noble UX (Android 5.1.1); TouchWiz Hero UX (Android 6.0.1) - T-Mobile, MetroPCS	TouchWiz Hero UX (Android 6.0.1)
Galaxy On	Galaxy On7	TouchWiz Noble UX (Android 5.1.1)	TouchWiz Hero UX (Android 6.0.1)
Galaxy On	Galaxy On5 Pro	TouchWiz Hero UX (Android 6.0.1)	TouchWiz Hero UX (Android 6.0.1)
Galaxy On	Galaxy On7 Pro	TouchWiz Hero UX (Android 6.0.1)	TouchWiz Hero UX (Android 6.0.1)
Galaxy On	Galaxy On8	TouchWiz Hero UX (Android 6.0.1)	TouchWiz Hero UX (Android 6.0.1)
Galaxy On	Galaxy On5 (2016)	TouchWiz Hero UX (Android 6.0.1)	Samsung Experience 9.5 (Android 8.1)
Galaxy On	Galaxy On7 (2016) / On NXT	TouchWiz Hero UX (Android 6.0.1)	Samsung Experience 9.5 (Android 8.1)
Galaxy S	Galaxy S	TouchWiz 3.0 (Android 2.1)	TouchWiz 4.0 (Android 2.3.6)
Galaxy S	Galaxy SL	TouchWiz 3.0 (Android 2.2.1)	TouchWiz 4.0 (Android 2.3.6)
Galaxy S	Galaxy S Plus	TouchWiz 3.0 (Android 2.3.3)	TouchWiz 4.0 (Android 2.3.6)
Galaxy S	Galaxy S Glide / Captivate Glide	TouchWiz 4.0 (Android 2.3.5)	TouchWiz Nature UX (Android 4.0.4)
Galaxy S	Galaxy S Blaze 4G	TouchWiz 4.0 (Android 2.3.6)	TouchWiz Nature UX (Android 4.0.4)
Galaxy S	Galaxy S Advance	TouchWiz 4.0 (Android 2.3.6)	TouchWiz Nature UX 2.0 (Android 4.1.2)
Galaxy S	Galaxy S II / S II Skyrocket	TouchWiz 4.0 (Android 2.3.4)	TouchWiz Nature UX (Android 4.1.2)
Galaxy S	Galaxy S II Plus	TouchWiz Nature UX (Android 4.1.2)	TouchWiz Nature UX 2.0 (Android 4.2.2)
Galaxy S	Galaxy S III	TouchWiz Nature UX (4.0.4)	TouchWiz Nature UX 2.5 (Android 4.3); TouchWiz Nature UX 2.5 (Android 4.4.2) - 2 GB RAM
Galaxy S	Galaxy S III Mini	TouchWiz Nature UX (Android 4.1.1)	TouchWiz Nature UX 2.0 (Android 4.1.2); TouchWiz Nature UX 2.5 (Android 4.4.2) - AT&T and Verizon
Galaxy S	Galaxy S III Neo	TouchWiz Nature UX 2.5 (Android 4.3)	TouchWiz Nature UX 3.0 (Android 4.4.4)
Galaxy S	Galaxy S Duos	TouchWiz Nature UX (Android 4.0.4)	
Galaxy S	Galaxy S Duos 2	TouchWiz Nature UX 2.0 (Android 4.2.2)	
Galaxy S	Galaxy S Duos 3 / Duos 3 VE	TouchWiz Essence UX (Android 4.4.4)	
Galaxy S	Galaxy S4 Mini i919X/S4 Zoom/S4 LTE-A	TouchWiz Nature UX 2.0 (Android 4.2.2)	TouchWiz Nature UX 3.0 (Android 4.4.2); select regions only
Galaxy S	Galaxy S4 / S4 VE / S4 Active	TouchWiz Nature UX 2.0 (Android 4.2.2)	TouchWiz Nature UX 4.0 (Android 5.0.1)
Galaxy S	Galaxy S5 / S5 Active / S5 Sport / S5 Mini	TouchWiz Nature UX 3.0 (Android 4.4.2)	TouchWiz Hero UX (Android 6.0.1)
Galaxy S	Galaxy S5 Neo	TouchWiz Noble UX (Android 5.1.1)	Samsung Experience 8.0 (Android 7.0)
Galaxy S	Galaxy S6 / S6 Edge	TouchWiz Zero UX (Android 5.0.2)	Samsung Experience 8.0 (Android 7.0)
Galaxy S	Galaxy S6 Edge+	TouchWiz Noble UX (Android 5.1.1)	Samsung Experience 8.0 (Android 7.0)
Galaxy S	Galaxy S7 / S7 Edge	TouchWiz Hero UX (Android 6.0.1)	Samsung Experience 9.0 (Android 8.0)
Galaxy Trend	Galaxy Trend	TouchWiz Nature UX (Android 4.0.4)	
Galaxy Trend	Galaxy Trend Lite / Fresh	TouchWiz Nature UX 2.0 (Android 4.1.2)	
Galaxy Trend	Galaxy Trend Plus	TouchWiz Nature UX 2.0 (Android 4.2.2)	
Galaxy Trend	Galaxy Trend II	TouchWiz Nature UX 2.0 (Android 4.1.2)	
Galaxy Trend	Galaxy Trend 2 Lite	TouchWiz Essence UX (Android 4.4.4)	
Galaxy Trend	Galaxy Trend 3	TouchWiz Nature UX 2.0 (Android 4.1.2) - SM-G3508, SM-G3508I, SM-G3509, SM-G3509I; TouchWiz Nature UX 2.0 (Android 4.2.2) - SM-G3502, SM-G3502U; TouchWiz Nature UX 2.0 (Android 4.3) - SM-G3508C, SM-G3502I, SM-G3508J, SM-G3508L, SM-G350L	
Galaxy Trend	Galaxy Trend Neo	TouchWiz Essence UX (Android 4.4.2)	
Galaxy Xcover	Galaxy Xcover	TouchWiz 3.0 (Android 2.3.4/2.3.6)	
Galaxy Xcover	Galaxy Xcover 2	TouchWiz Nature UX 2.0 (Android 4.1.2)	
Galaxy Xcover	Galaxy Xcover 3	TouchWiz Nature UX 3.0 (Android 4.4.4) - G388F; TouchWiz Hero UX (Android 6.0.1) - G389F	TouchWiz Noble UX (Android 5.1.1) - G388F; TouchWiz Hero UX (Android 6.0.1) - G389F
Gravity	Gravity Smart	TouchWiz 3.0 (Android 2.2)	
Rugby	Rugby Smart	TouchWiz 3.0 (Android 2.3)	
Other	Infuse 4G	TouchWiz 3.0 (Android 2.3.3/2.3.6)	
Other	Illusion	TouchWiz 3.0 (Android 2.3)	

==== Tablets ====
Series	Device	Original version	Current version
Galaxy Tab	Galaxy Tab 7.0	TouchWiz 3.0	TouchWiz 4.0
Galaxy Tab	Galaxy Tab 7.0 Plus	TouchWiz 4.0	TouchWiz Nature UX
Galaxy Tab	Galaxy Tab 7.7	TouchWiz 4.0	TouchWiz Nature UX
Galaxy Tab	Galaxy Tab 8.0	TouchWiz 4.0	TouchWiz Nature UX
Galaxy Tab	Galaxy Tab 10.1	TouchWiz 4.0	TouchWiz Nature UX
Galaxy Tab 2	Galaxy Tab 2 7.0	TouchWiz Nature UX Lite	TouchWiz Nature UX 2.0
Galaxy Tab 2	Galaxy Tab 2 10.1	TouchWiz Nature UX Lite	TouchWiz Nature UX 2.0
Galaxy Tab 3	Galaxy Tab 3 7.0	TouchWiz Nature UX 2.0	TouchWiz Nature UX 2.5
Galaxy Tab 3	Galaxy Tab 3 8.0	TouchWiz Nature UX 2.0	TouchWiz Nature UX 2.5
Galaxy Tab 3	Galaxy Tab 3 10.1	TouchWiz Nature UX 2.0	TouchWiz Nature UX 2.5
Galaxy Tab 3	Galaxy Tab 3 Lite 7.0	TouchWiz Nature UX 2.0	TouchWiz Nature UX 2.0
Galaxy Tab 3	Galaxy Tab 3 V	TouchWiz Essence UX	
Galaxy Tab 4	Galaxy Tab 4 7.0	TouchWiz Nature UX 3.0	
Galaxy Tab 4	Galaxy Tab 4 8.0	TouchWiz Nature UX 3.0	
Galaxy Tab 4	Galaxy Tab 4 10.1	TouchWiz Nature UX 3.0	
Galaxy Note	Galaxy Note 8.0	TouchWiz Nature UX	TouchWiz Nature UX 2.0 (4.2.2) TouchWiz Nature UX 3.0 (4.4.2)
Galaxy Note	Galaxy Note 10.1	TouchWiz Nature UX Lite	TouchWiz Nature UX TouchWiz Nature UX 2.5
Galaxy Note	Galaxy Note 10.1 2014 Edition	TouchWiz Nature UX 2.5	TouchWiz Nature UX 3.0 TouchWiz Zero UX
Galaxy Note	Galaxy Note Pro 12.2	TouchWiz Nature UX 3.0	TouchWiz Nature UX 3.5
Galaxy Tab Pro	Galaxy Tab Pro 8.4	TouchWiz Nature UX 3.0	TouchWiz Noble UX
Galaxy Tab Pro	Galaxy Tab Pro 10.1	TouchWiz Nature UX 3.0	TouchWiz Noble UX
Galaxy Tab Pro	Galaxy Tab Pro 12.2	TouchWiz Nature UX 3.0	TouchWiz Noble UX
Galaxy Tab S	Galaxy Tab S 8.4	TouchWiz Nature UX 3.0	TouchWiz Nature UX 4.5
Galaxy Tab S	Galaxy Tab S 10.5	TouchWiz Nature UX 3.0	TouchWiz Nature UX 4.5
Galaxy Tab S	Galaxy Tab S2 (8.0/9.7) (2015)	TouchWiz Zero UX	Samsung Experience 8.0
Galaxy Tab S	Galaxy Tab S2 (8.0/9.7) (2016)	TouchWiz Hero UX	Samsung Experience 8.0
Galaxy Tab A	Galaxy Tab A 8.0 (2015)	TouchWiz Zero UX	Samsung Experience 8.0
Galaxy Tab A	Galaxy Tab A 9.7 (2015)	TouchWiz Zero UX	Samsung Experience 8.0
Galaxy Tab A	Galaxy Tab A 7.0 (2016)	TouchWiz Noble UX	
Galaxy Tab A	Galaxy Tab A 10.1 (2016)	TouchWiz Hero UX	Samsung Experience 9.5
Galaxy Tab E	Galaxy Tab E 9.6 (International)	TouchWiz Nature UX 4.5	
Galaxy Tab E	Galaxy Tab E 9.6 (US)	TouchWiz Noble UX	Samsung Experience 8.0
Galaxy Tab E	Galaxy Tab E 8.0	TouchWiz Noble UX	Samsung Experience 8.5

=== Android 5 and later based TouchWiz versions ===
Version	Image	Build ID	Android version	Release date	Features
TouchWiz Nature UX 4.0		I9505XXUHPK2 (S4)	Android 5.0.1 "Lollipop"	December 3, 2014	Flat, minimalistic design; New app icons were introduced; System apps became flat as well, compliacing with the same redesign Google introduced in Android 5.0
TouchWiz Zero UX (released with Galaxy S6)			Android 5.0.2 "Lollipop"	March 1, 2015	• Simpler naming system: No longer "Nature UX"; Minor redesign of some elements (e.g. control panel)
TouchWiz Noble UX (released with Galaxy Note 5 and Galaxy S6 Edge+)		N920CXXU3CQC7 (Note 5)	Android 5.1.1 "Lollipop"	August 13, 2015	• Refresh of design: Squircle icons; New notification pane; Graceful animations; • New camera options: Livestream to YouTube
TouchWiz Hero UX (released with Galaxy S7)		G930FXXU1DQDD (S7)	Android 6.0.1 "Marshmallow"	March 11, 2016	• Edge UX 2.0: Tasks Edge (shortcut to commonly used tasks); Edge Panels (compass, flashlight, ruler; news aggregators); • Increased organization: New "advanced settings pane"; Ability to move multiple apps at once; Bug fixes and performance improvements.
TouchWiz Grace UX (released with Galaxy Note 7)		N930FXXU1APG7 (Note 7)	Android 6.0.1 "Marshmallow" - 7.0 "Nougat"	August 19, 2016	

== See also ==
- Timeline of operating systems

Preceded by Croix UI	TouchWiz; 2008–2016	Succeeded by Samsung Experience
