= Samsung T746/T749 =

Cell phone model

Samsung SGH-T746 (Impact) / SGH-T749 (Highlight)
- Manufacturer: Samsung Electronics
- First released: July 15, 2009; 17 years ago
- Availability by region: WW: July 15, 2009
- Compatible networks: GSM 850 / 900 / 1800 / 1900; UMTS 1700 / 2100; HSDPA 850 / 1900 (1700 / 2100 for T-Mobile)
- Form factor: Slate
- Dimensions: 4.27 x 2.11 x 0.54" (108 x 54 x 14 mm)
- Weight: 3.70 oz (105 g)
- Operating system: Samsung TouchWiz (Proprietary)
- Memory: Flash memory + microSD slot
- Storage: 60 MB of flash memory
- Removable storage: microSD/SDHC (up to 16 GB)
- Battery: Removable Lithium-ion 1200 mAh
- Rear camera: 3 MP; 3x Optical Zoom; Image: 2048x1536 Video: 320x240
- Display: 3", 240 x 400 px, 262K 16M Color TFT
- Connectivity: Bluetooth 2.0 + EDR; USB 2.0; S-20 Pin
- Data inputs: Touchscreen
- Other: JAVA MIDP 2.0 Application Technology; E-Mail; A-GPS; Web (WAP 2.0/xHTML, HTML); Text (SMS/MMS); Accelerometer sensor; IM; Organizer; Predictive text; Phonebook

The Samsung Impact (SGH-T746) / Samsung Highlight (SGH-T749) is a 3G-capable phone manufactured by Samsung. The phone is touchscreen-only, and comes with a microSD slot under the battery cover, like the T-Mobile Tap. It comes in two colors, fire (red/orange) and ice (black/blue).

Software Version (T749): T749UVIK1.

== Accessories supplied in the box ==
- 1200 mAh Battery
- 4.75V S20-Pin Charger
- S20-Pin Headset
- S20-Pin to USB 2.0 Data Cable
- User Guide & Manuals (2009)
- back for phone

== See also ==
- Samsung Solstice
