= Samsung REX =

Range of cellphones

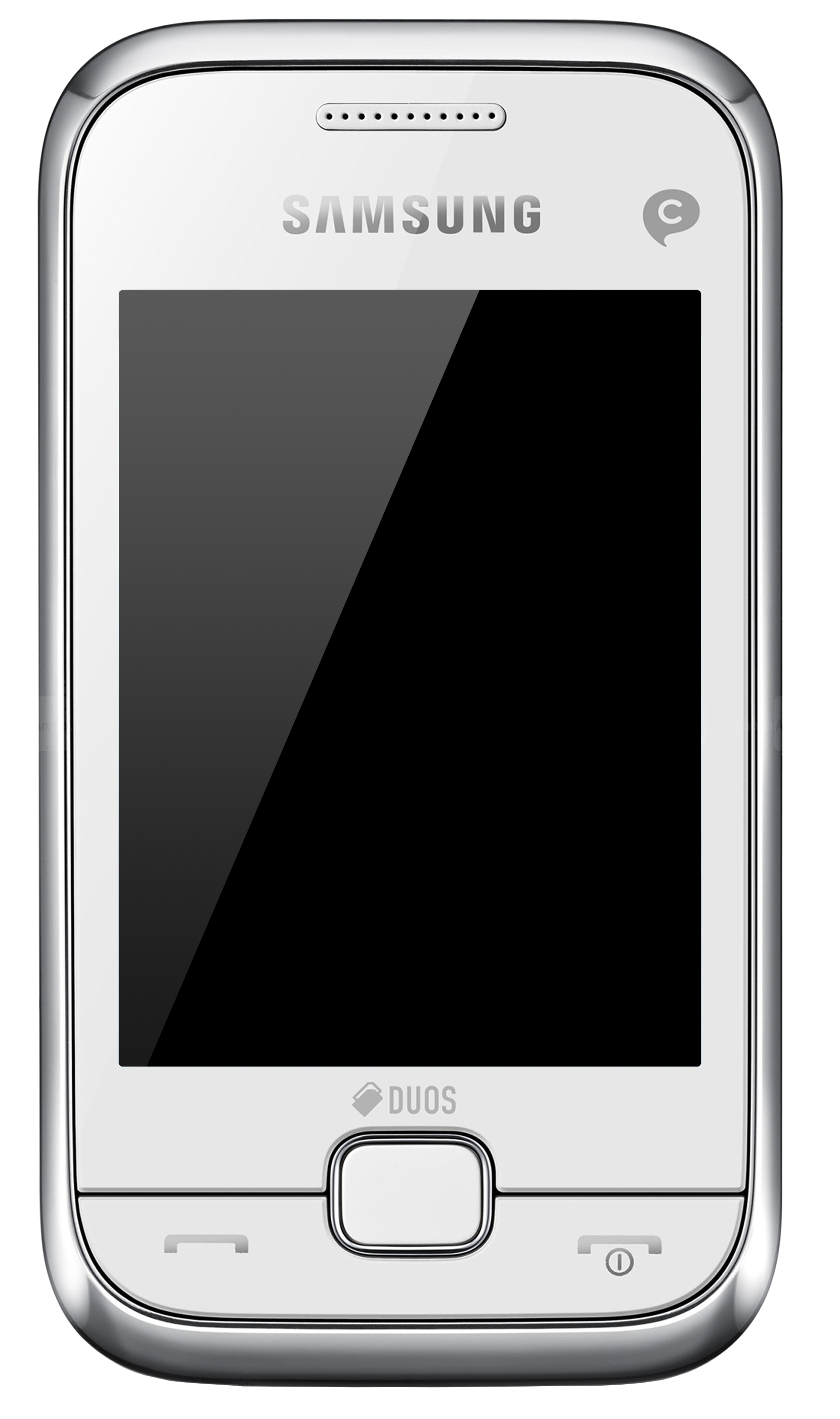
Rex U

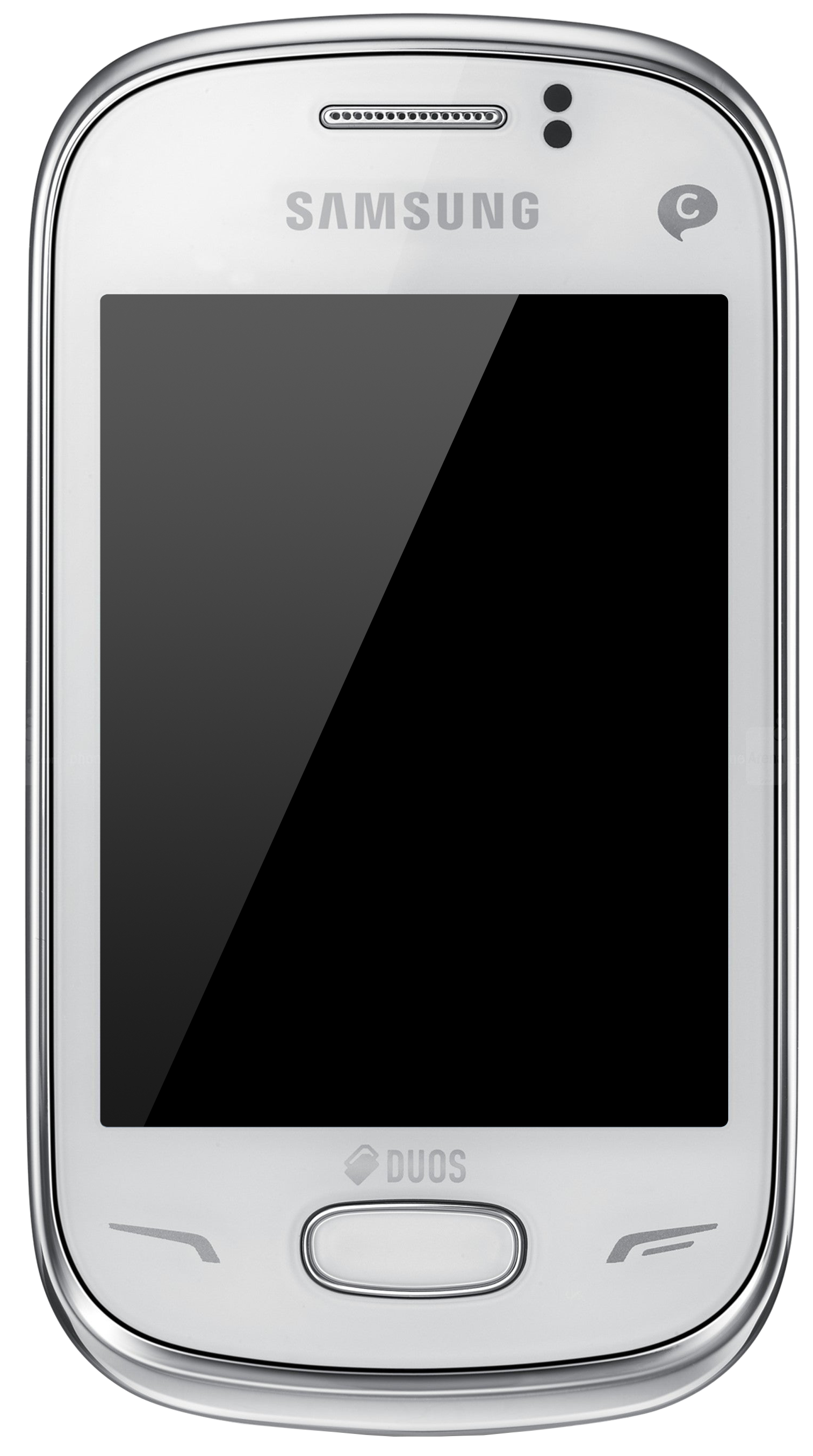
Rex G

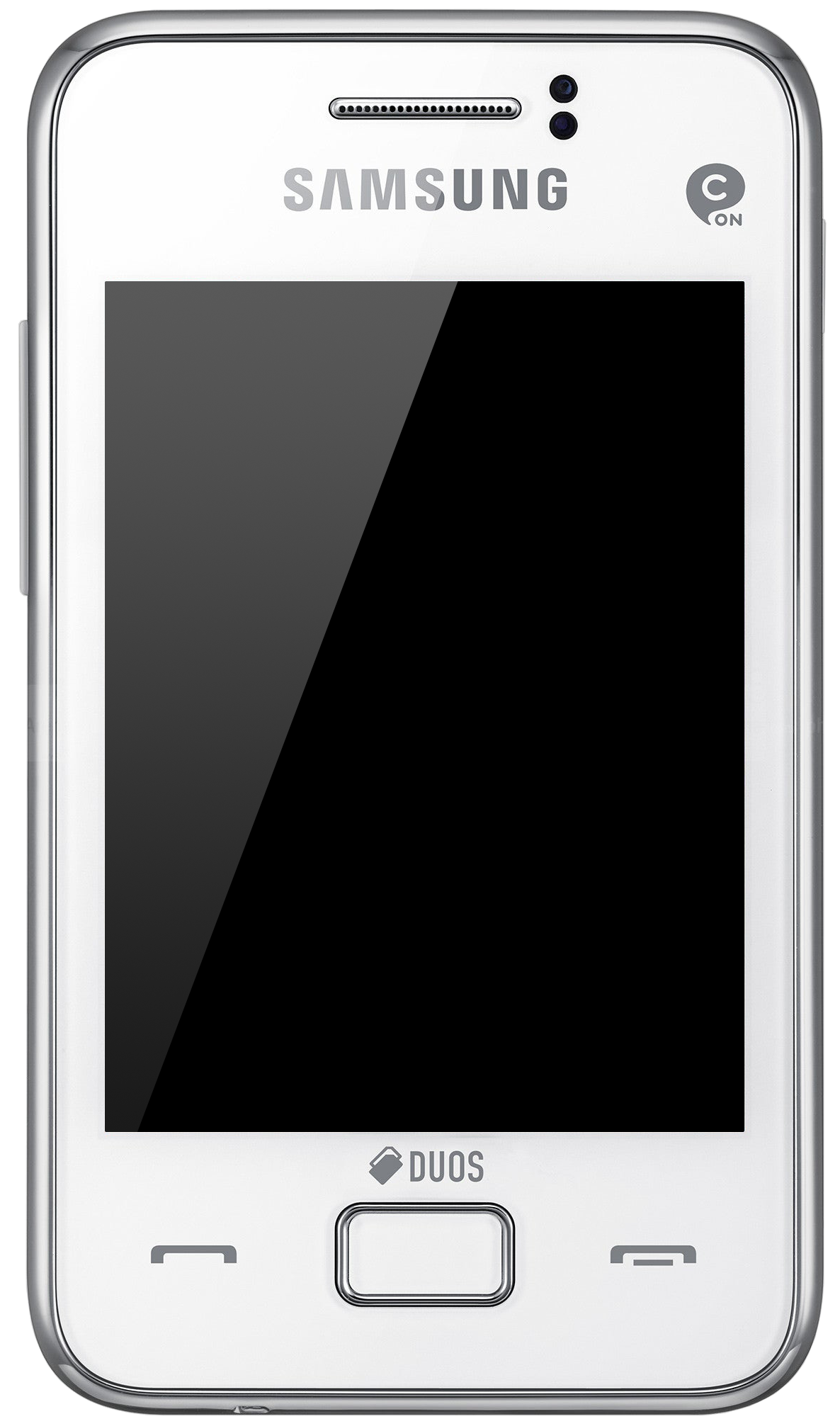
Rex Neo

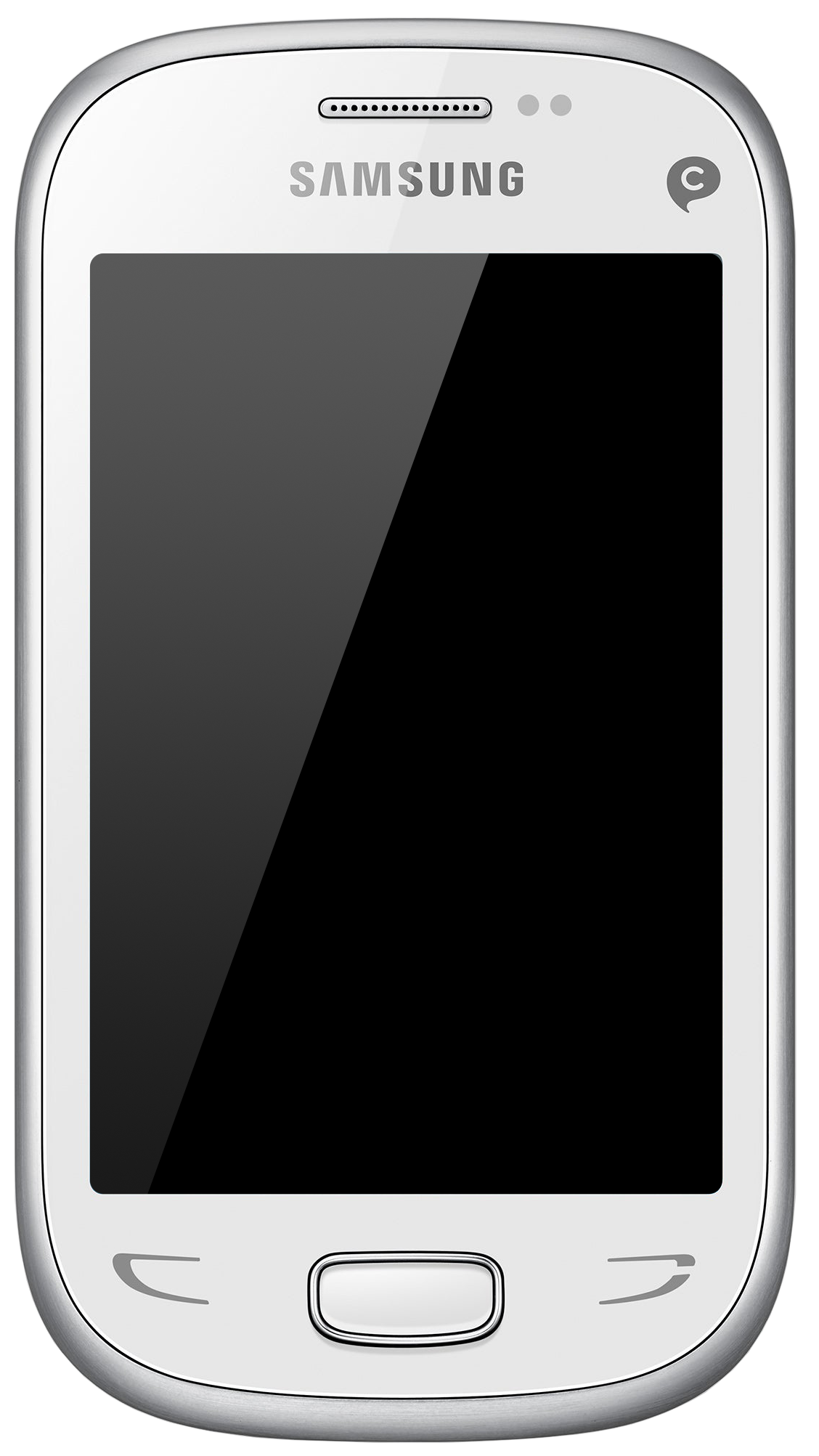
Rex S

The Samsung REX series is a range of smartphones and feature phones by Samsung, ranging from low to mid-end phones and running the Nucleus RTOS-based Samsung Handset Platform with Samsung's TouchWiz user interface. It was one of the Samsung line of devices that are aimed at the budget phone market alongside lower end Samsung Galaxy devices. Its main competition includes the Nokia Asha range and Firefox OS. Currently, most devices are dual-SIM equipped and only released in the Indian market. The Samsung REX 90 was being also sold in CIS countries.

== List of devices ==
There are four mobile phones in the REX range ever released

- REX U (also known as Samsung Champ Deluxe)
- REX G (also available as single-SIM phone)
- REX Neo (also known as Samsung Star 3, but with improved software)
- REX S

== See also ==
- Firefox OS
- Nokia Asha series
