= Samsung Galaxy Trend 2 Lite =

Low-end smartphone

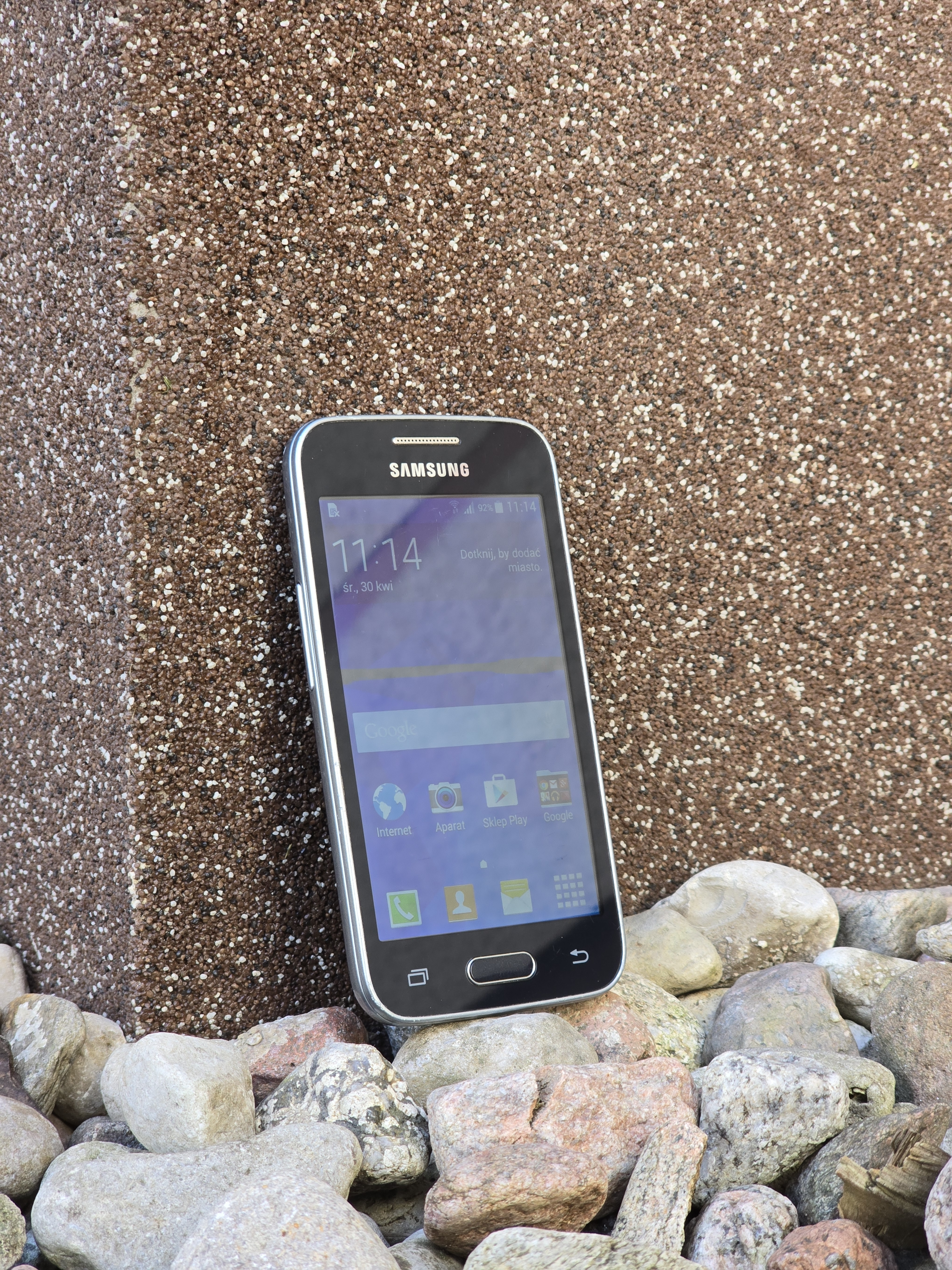
- Brand: Samsung Galaxy
- Manufacturer: Samsung Electronics
- Type: Smartphones
- Series: Galaxy Trend
- First released: July 2015; 11 years ago
- Discontinued: September 2016; 9 years ago
- Predecessor: Samsung Galaxy Trend Lite
- Related: Samsung Galaxy Trend 2 Samsung Galaxy J2 Prime; Samsung Galaxy J1 mini Prime
- Form factor: Slate
- Colors: Black, white
- Dimensions: 121.4 mm (4.78 in) H 62.9 mm (2.48 in) W 10.7 mm (0.42 in) D
- Weight: 123 g (4.3 oz)
- Operating system: Android 4.4.4 KitKat
- System-on-chip: Spreadtrum SC8830
- CPU: Dual-Core, 1.2 GHz
- GPU: Mali-400 MP
- Memory: 512 MB RAM
- Storage: 4 GB (1.9 GB available)
- Removable storage: MicroSD support for up to 64GB
- Battery: 1500 mAh Li-ion (removable)
- Rear camera: 3.2 Megapixel 2048x1536 LED Flash. 24 fps
- Display: 4 in (100 mm) 400 x 800 pixels (233 ppi) TFT LCD capacitive touchscreen, 16M colors
- Connectivity: Wi-Fi 802.11/b/g/n (2.4 GHz); Bluetooth 4.0; Stereo FM radio with RDS microUSB 2.0; Wi-Fi Direct; GPS Location; Wi-Fi Hotspot,
- Data inputs: Acelerometer

Samsung Galaxy Trend 2 Lite is a low-end smartphone released by Samsung Electronics in July 2015. Like all other Samsung Galaxy smartphones, it runs on the Android mobile operating system. It was released around the same time when Samsung consolidated entire Galaxy range with A and later J series models.

== Specifications ==
=== Hardware ===
Samsung Galaxy Trend 2 Lite is powered by Spreadtrum SC8830 system-on chip with a 32-bit 1.2 GHz processor and ARM Mali-400 MP GPU. It has a 4-inch TFT LCD touchscreen. The phone has 3G+ capabilities, albeit having microSIM card slot. It has a removable battery.

==== Camera ====
The Galaxy Trend 2 Lite has a 3.2-megapixel camera with LED flash and no front-facing camera. The rear camera has 4 shooting modes. It can record 480p video at 24 fps.

==== Memory and storage ====
The Galaxy Trend 2 Lite features 512 MB of RAM and 4GB of internal storage. It supports removable MicroSD cards for storage expansion up to 64 GB.

=== Software ===
The device runs on Android 4.4.4 KitKat with Samsung's TouchWiz Essence UX user interface.
