= Samsung Champ =

Mobile phone model released in 2010

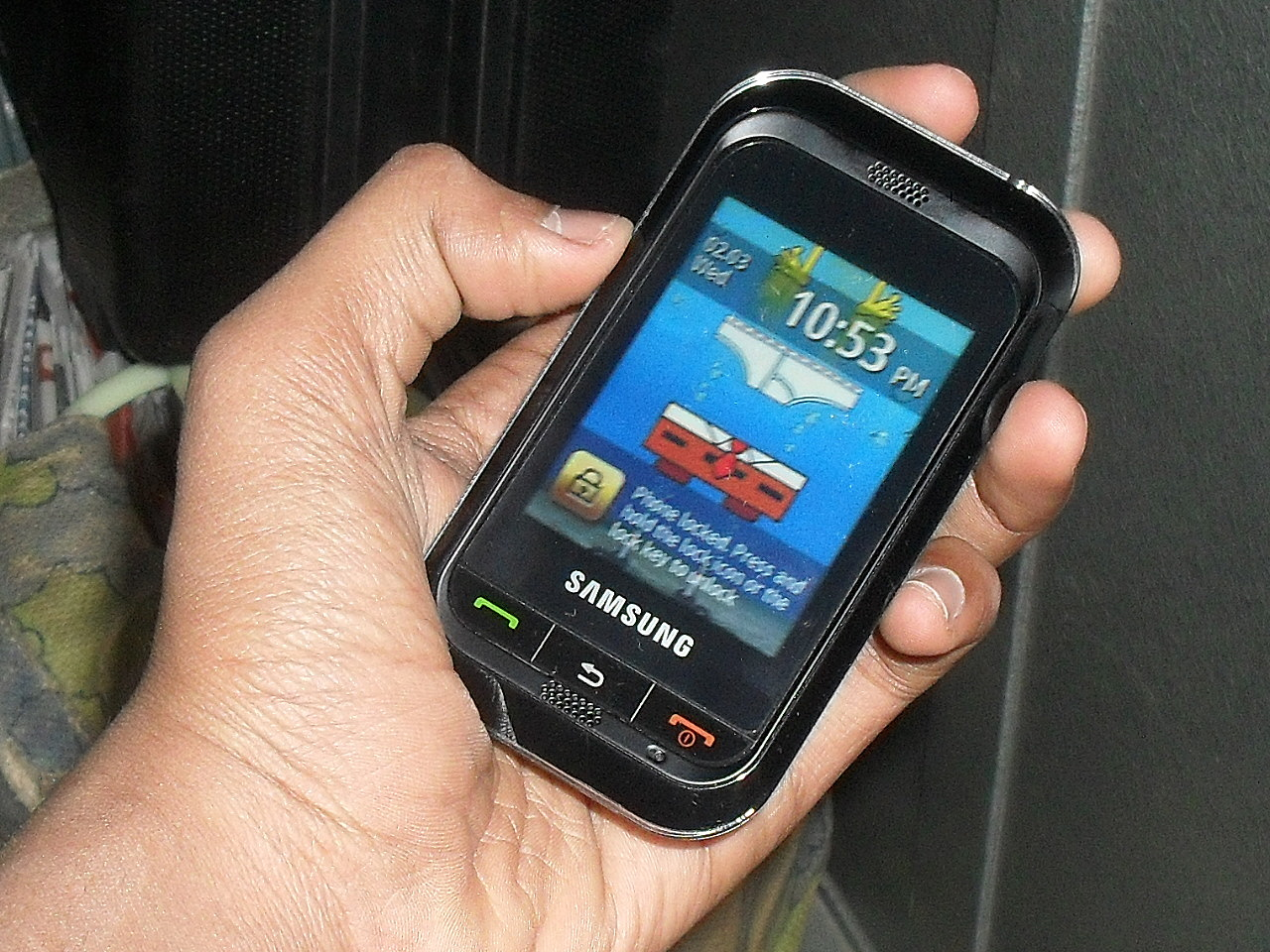
- Manufacturer: Samsung Mobiles
- Availability by region: May 2010
- Compatible networks: GSM, GPRS, EDGE
- Form factor: Bar
- Dimensions: 96.3×53.8×13 mm (3.79×2.12×0.51 in)
- Weight: 80 g (3 oz)
- Memory: 30 MB internal storage
- Removable storage: microSD, up to 8 GB
- Battery: Li-Ion 1000 mAh
- Rear camera: Digital Camera, 1.3-megapixel (select models)
- Front camera: None
- Display: 240 x 320 pixels 256k, 2.4 inch Resistive Touchscreen
- Connectivity: Bluetooth v2.1, microUSB v2.0
- Data inputs: Integrated Touchscreen Keypad
- Development status: Available

The Samsung Champ is an entry-level mobile phone that was announced by Samsung in May 2010 (model numbers GT-C3300 and GT-C3303). An updated version was introduced in August 2011 (model number GT-C3303i). It was also marketed as Samsung Libre, Star Mini and Player Mini, the latter two an evolution of the Samsung GT-S5230.

Samsung Champ features a quad band GSM support along with a 40 MB internal flash memory (expandable up to 8 GB via microSD), a 2.4-inch, 240 x 320-pixel resistive touchscreen display, and runs on a proprietary operating system featuring a 'lite' version of the TouchWiz interface.

The phone is equipped with a 3.5 mm audio jack, which enables it to be connected with any earphones or speakers of daily use. The phone also comes with dual speakers, a built in voice equalizer, a Bluetooth messenger, and an FM radio with an internal antenna. There is also a digital camera on select models (1.3-megapixel camera).

The Samsung Champ was one of the cheapest touchscreen phones available to buy in the market, with prices ranging between $30 and $35. Due to its low price and compact size, the phone was very popular with young users and those located in developing markets across Europe, Asia, Latin America, Africa, and the Middle East. It was succeeded by Samsung Champ 2 (GT-C3330).

== Full specifications ==
=== Platform ===
- GSM 850 / 900 / 1800 / 1900
- UI: TouchWiz Lite UI
- WAP 2.0/xHTML, HTML
- Java MIDP v2.0
- Only Samsung Champ Duos support WiFi

=== Size ===
- Dimensions: 96.2 x 53.8 x 13 mm
- Weight: 80 grams

=== Display ===
- 2.4 inch TFT LCD resistive touchscreen
- Resolution: 240x320 pixels
- Colors: 256k

=== Battery ===
- Li-Ion 1000 mAh
- Up to 12 hours talk-time
- Up to 666 hours standby

=== Camera ===
- Digital camera (1,3 megapixel in select models)
- 4x digital zoom
- Customizable modes and effects
- Video camera: QCIF (176x144) in AVI format.

=== Music and sound ===
- Music player with background play
- MP3/AAC playback.
- Built-in equalizer
- Music library
- 3.5 mm audio jack
- Front dual speakers
- Bluetooth compatibility

=== Entertainment ===
- Built-In JAVA games
- Stereo FM radio with internal antenna
- 30 MB internal memory
- Expandable memory up to 8 GB via microSD
- 1000 phonebook contacts
