= Samsung SGH-A877 =

Cell phone model

Samsung Impression (SGH-A877)
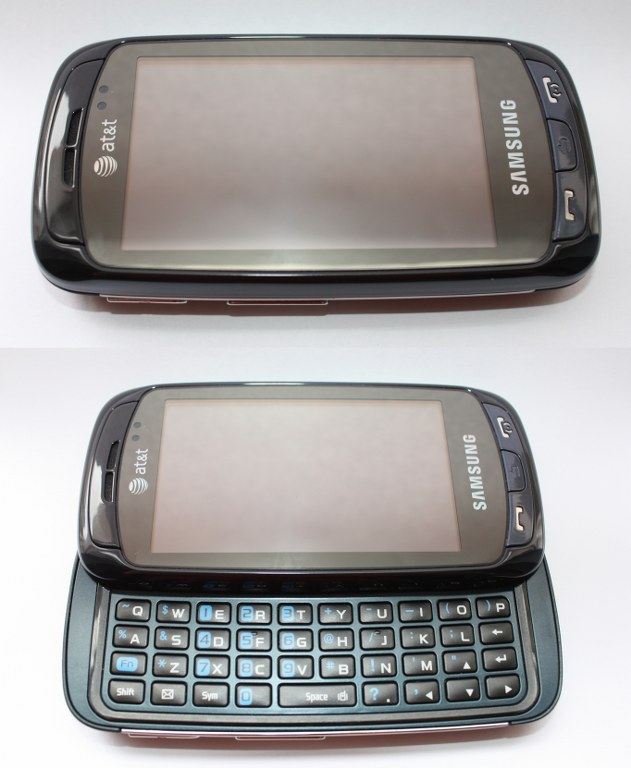
- Manufacturer: Samsung Electronics
- Related: Samsung Impression Website
- Compatible networks: GSM (850 - 900 - 1800 - 1900); EDGE / HSDPA
- Form factor: Slider
- Dimensions: 114×58×15 mm (4.49×2.28×0.59 in)
- Weight: 150 g (5 oz)
- CPU: ARM926EJ-S 297 MHz
- Memory: 190 MB Internal, microSD (TransFlash) external memory card slot
- Battery: 1000mAh Li-Ion
- Rear camera: 3.15 megapixels digital zoom
- Display: 240 x 400, 3.2" Display; 256K-color AMOLED touchscreen
- Connectivity: USB & Bluetooth V 2.0

The Samsung Impression (a.k.a. Samsung SGH-A877, SGH-A877, A877) is a slider-style mobile phone manufactured by Samsung Electronics. First announced on March 30, 2009, it was released on April 7, 2009. It was the first phone manufactured for the United States to have an AMOLED touch-screen.

== Design ==
The Samsung Impression SGH-A877 takes on a slider form; featuring a 3.2-inch AMOLED touch screen (240x400 pixels) capable of 256k (256,000) colors. The front of the phone contains the brilliant touch screen, and three bottom buttons; an incoming call accept button, an incoming call reject/hang up button (which doubles as the power button), and a back button. The sides of the phone hold the volume control rocker, the lock button, the quick navigation menu, and the camera button. The top contains the proprietary headset, charger, and USB jack. For text input, the Impression features a backlit full QWERTY slide-out keyboard, a full QWERTY on-screen keyboard, a more common number pad mode, and a handwriting mode designed to use with a stylus. This is one of the quick messaging models available through AT&T.

== Features ==
- 3.2 inches (8.1 cm) AMOLED touch-screen display
- WQVGA display resolution
- 3 megapixel digital zoom camera
- Camcorder
- Proprietary headset, charger, and USB jack
- Up to 16 GB microSD memory card slot
- Full HTML Browsing
- Full slide-out QWERTY keyboard
- MP3 Player
- YouTube Capable
- TouchWiz Widget Bar
- Bluetooth 2.0
- Accelerometer
- Quad-band World phone

== Contents ==
Samsung Impression

- SIM Card
- Wall Charger
- USB connector
- CD Manual
- Start Guide

== See also ==
- Samsung Solstice
