= Samsung Galaxy Chat =

Mobile phone model

Samsung Galaxy Chat GT-B5330

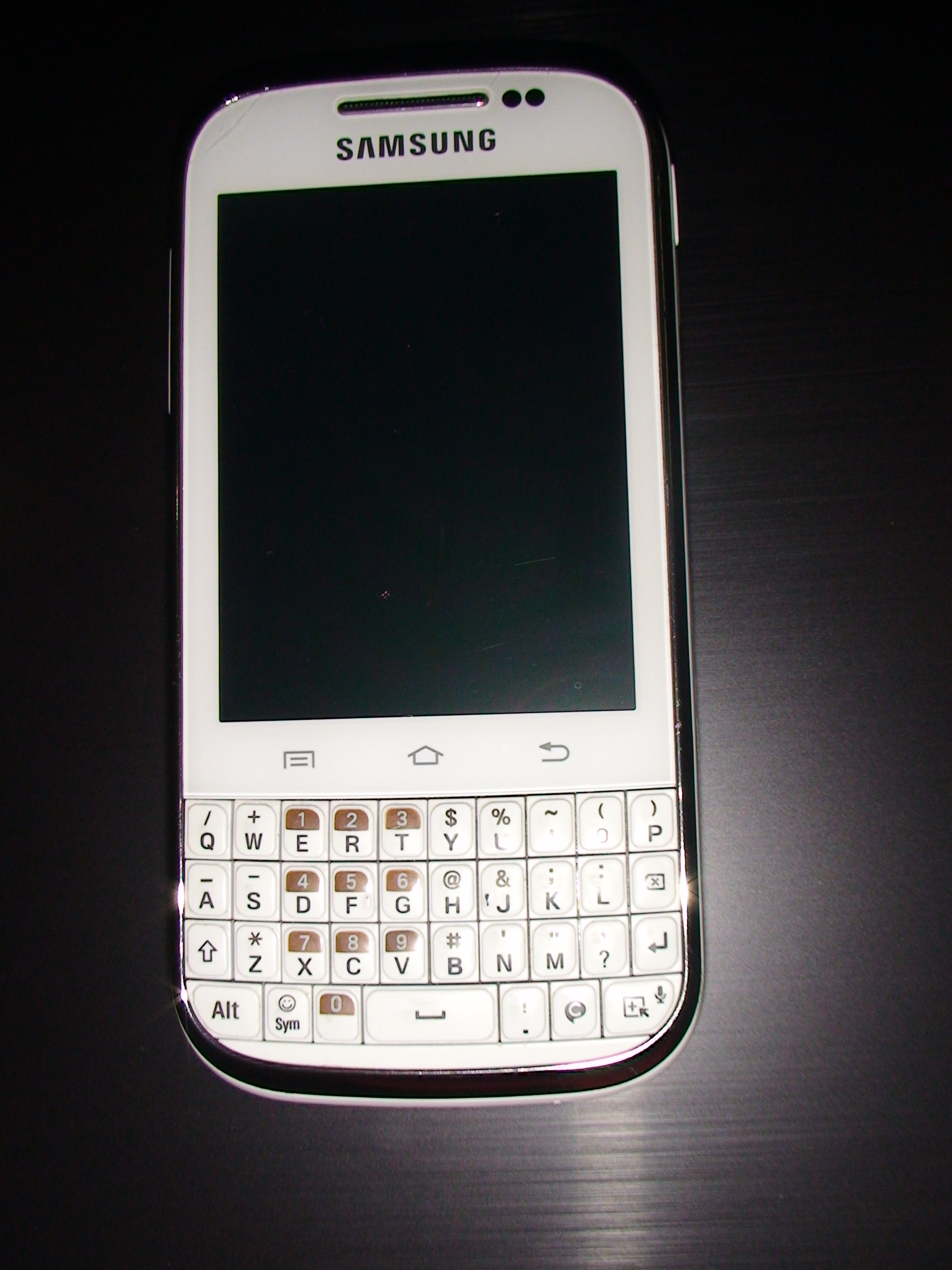
- Samsung Galaxy Chat GT-B5330
- Manufacturer: Samsung
- Series: Galaxy
- First released: August 2012; 14 years ago
- Compatible networks: GSM 850/900/1800/1900; HSDPA 7.2 Mbps 900/2100
- Operating system: Android 4.0.4 (Ice Cream Sandwich) and upgradeable to 4.1.2 (Jelly Bean)
- Removable storage: 4 GB (2.05 GB usable) microSDHC (up to 32 GB)
- Battery: Li-ion 1200 mAh
- Rear camera: 2 megapixel, 1600×1200 Fixed Focus, 15 fps QVGA 320x240px recording and stills, Panorama & Smile Shot
- Display: 240×320, 3.0 inch (133 ppi pixel density) TFT capacitive touchscreen, 256K colours
- Connectivity: Wi-Fi 802.11 b/g/n Bluetooth 3.0 with A2DP; A-GPS; Micro USB 2.0; 3.5 mm TRRS audio jack FM radio with RDS support
- Data inputs: Multi-touch touch screen, headset controls, proximity, accelerometer, aGPS, and stereo FM-radio

Samsung Galaxy Chat GT-B5330 is an Android-based budget smartphone by Samsung, announced in July 2012 and released in August 2012.

== Features ==
The device sports an 850 MHz, 4 GB of internal memory and supports up to 32 GB of removable storage through a microSD card. The phone has a 2 MP camera, a screen with a 240x320 resolution and a multitouch interface. As input interface includes a physical QWERTY keyboard. The phone offers connectivity options such as HSDPA 3G connection up to 7.2 Mbit/s and a Wi-Fi connection. The phone also offers Remote Controls which allows phone to be locked, tracked and data to be wiped remotely.

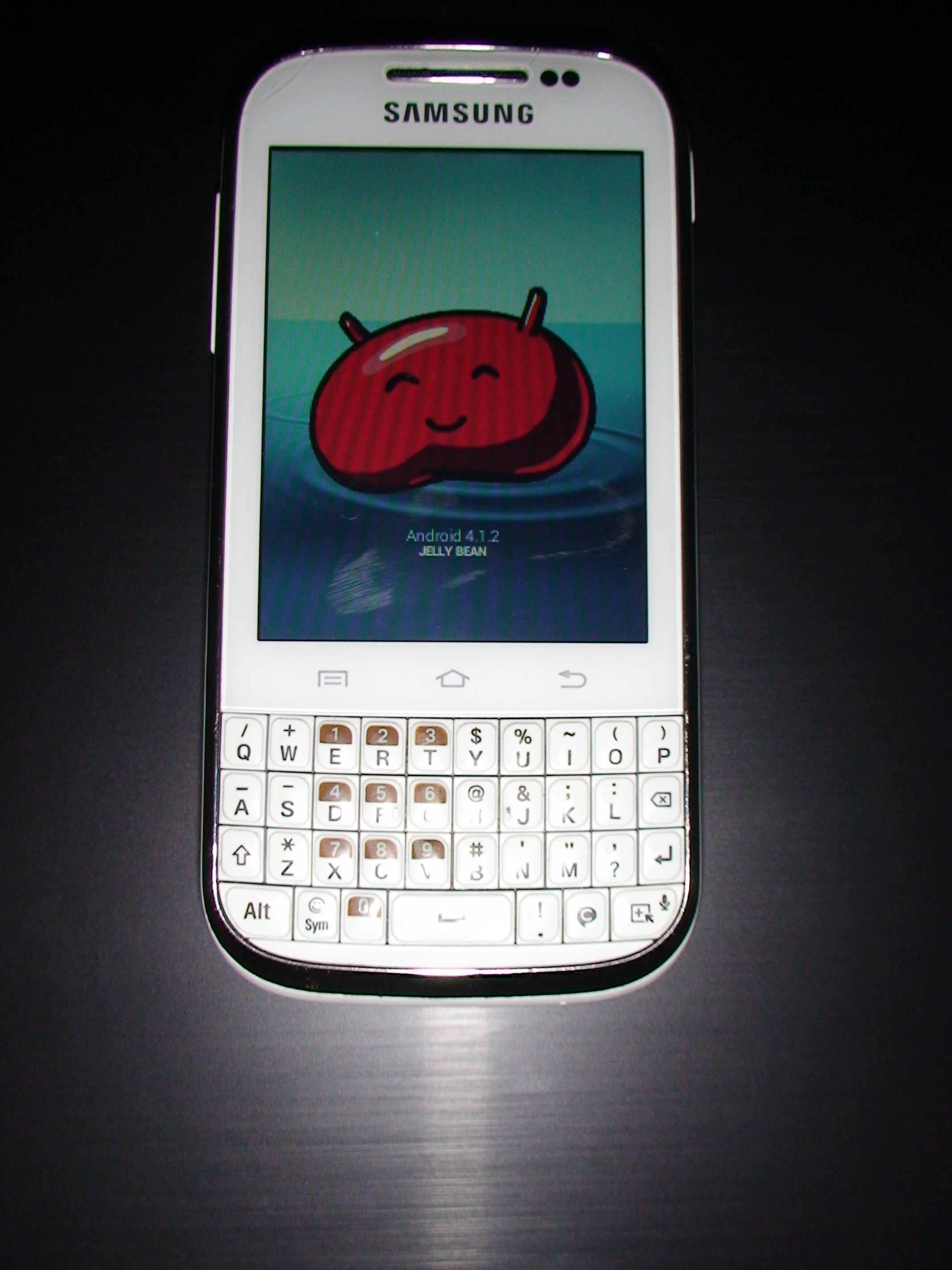
Samsung Galaxy Chat upgraded to Android's 4.1.2 Jelly Bean OS.

=== Processor ===
The Galaxy Chat has a Broadcom BCM21654 SoC, which has a single Cortex-A9 CPU core clocked at up to 850MHz and a Broadcom VideoCore IV GPU.

=== Memory ===
The Galaxy Chat features 4 GB of dedicated eMMC internal storage. It has a microSDHC slot (up to 32 GB).

=== Display ===
The Galaxy Chat uses a 76.2-millimetre (3.00 in) QVGA (240*320) TFT LCD capacitive multi-touch touchscreen which has a pixel density of 133 ppi.

=== Camera ===
The Galaxy Chat has a 2MP fixed focus camera that can record videos at up to QVGA resolution. The Galaxy Chat does not have a front-facing camera.

=== Software ===
Galaxy Chat features Android 4.0.4 Ice Cream Sandwich and then upgraded to 4.1.2 Jelly Bean OS with Samsung's proprietary TouchWiz user interface,

== See also ==
- Samsung Galaxy (series)
- List of Android smartphones
