= Samsung Galaxy On5 =

Android smartphone manufactured by Samsung Electronics

Samsung Galaxy On5 Samsung Galaxy On5 Pro
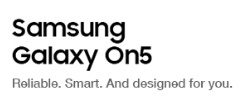

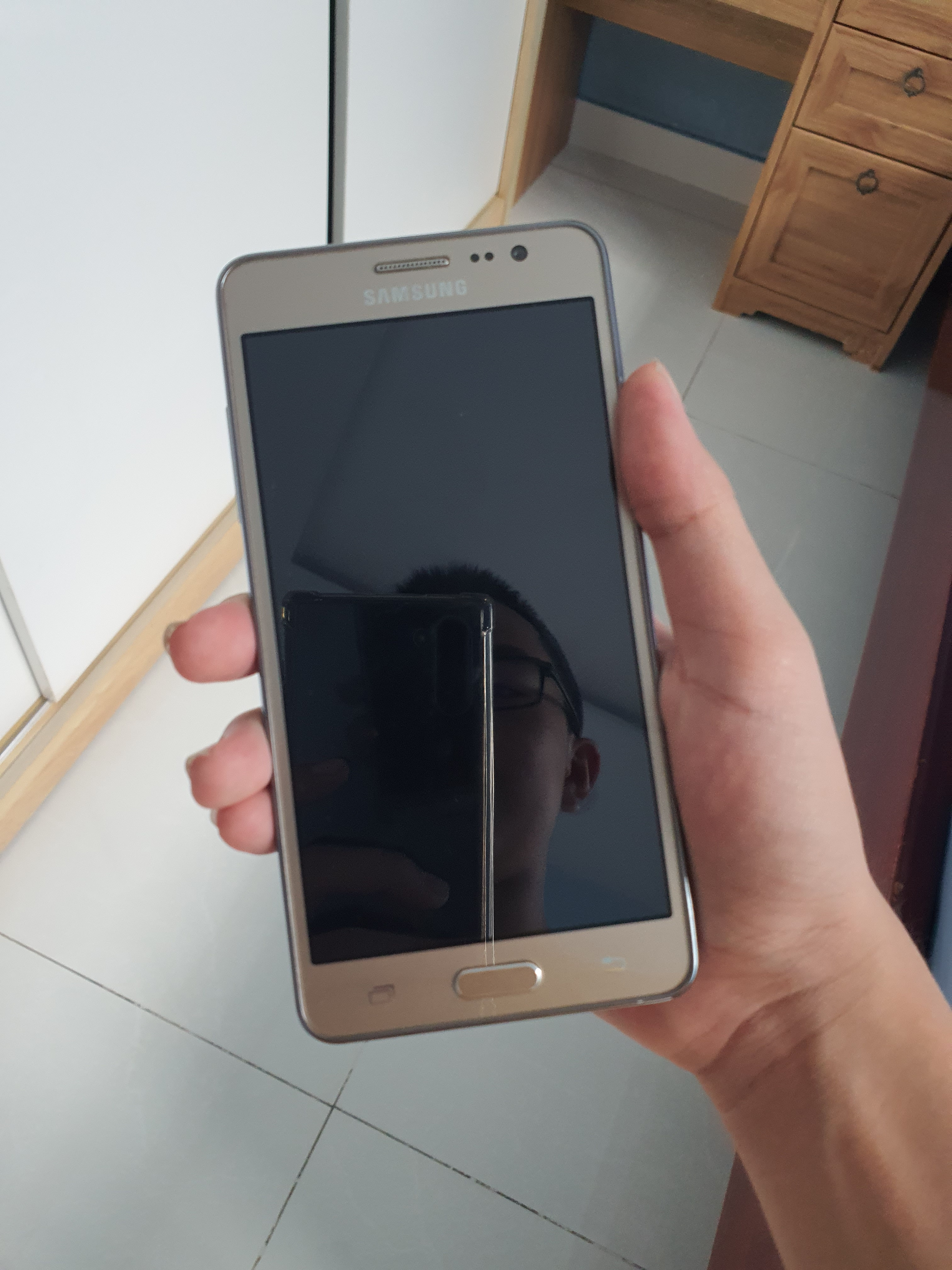
- The front of the Galaxy On5 in Gold
- Manufacturer: Samsung Electronics
- Type: Smartphone
- Series: Galaxy On
- First released: On5: October 2015; 11 years ago On5 Pro: July 2016; 10 years ago
- Availability by region: On5: November 2015; 10 years ago June 2016; 10 years ago (T-Mobile/MetroPCS); On5 Pro: July 2016; 10 years ago
- Predecessor: Samsung Galaxy Ace 4
- Successor: Samsung Galaxy On5 (2016)
- Related: Samsung Galaxy On7
- Compatible networks: (GSM/HSPA/LTE); 2G: GSM GSM850, GSM900, DCS1800, PCS1900; 3G UMTS: B1(2100), B2(1900), B5(850), B8(900); 4G FDD LTE: B1(2100), B3(1800), B5(850), B8(900), B20(800); 4G TDD LTE: B40(2300)
- Form factor: Slate
- Colors: Black, Gold
- Dimensions: 142.3 mm (5.60 in) H 72.1 mm (2.84 in) W 8.5 mm (0.33 in) D
- Weight: 149 g (5.3 oz)
- Operating system: Original: On5: Android 5.1.1 "Lollipop" with TouchWiz 5.1; On5 (T-Mobile/MetroPCS)/Pro: Android 6.0.1 "Marshmallow" with TouchWiz 6.0; Current: Android 6.0.1 "Marshmallow" with TouchWiz 6.0
- System-on-chip: Exynos 3475 Quad
- CPU: Quad-core 1.3 GHz Cortex-A7
- GPU: Mali-T720
- Memory: On5: 1.5 GB; On5 Pro: 2 GB; LPDDR3
- Storage: On5: 8 GB; On5 Pro: 16 GB eMMC 4.5
- Removable storage: microSDXC up to 128 GB
- SIM: On5/Pro: dual SIM (Micro-SIM); On5 (T-Mobile/MetroPCS): Nano-SIM
- Battery: Removable, Li-ion 2600 mAh
- Rear camera: On5/Pro: 8 MP, f/2.2, AF; Video: 1080p@30fps On5 (T-Mobile/MetroPCS): 5 MP; Video: 720p@30fps All models: LED flash
- Front camera: On5/Pro: 5 MP, f/2.2 Video: 1080p@30fps On5 (T-Mobile/MetroPCS): 2 MP; Video: 720p@30fps
- Display: 5 in (130 mm) 720 × 1280 pixels (294 ppi) TFT LCD, 16:9
- Sound: Front earpiece, rear mono speaker
- Connectivity: List: Wi-Fi: 802.11 b/g/n (2.4 GHz) (Wi-Fi Direct); GPS/GLONASS; Bluetooth 4.1; USB 2.0 (Micro-B port, USB charging); 3.50 mm (0.138 in) headphone jack
- Model: On5: SM-G5500, SM-G550F, SM-G5510, SM-G550T1, SM-G550T, SM-S550TL, SM-G550T2; On5 Pro: SM-G550F, SM-G550FY
- SAR: SAR US: 1.40 W/kg (head); 1.09 W/kg (body); SAR EU: 0.40 W/kg (head); 0.31 W/kg (body)

The Samsung Galaxy On5 and Samsung Galaxy On5 Pro are Android smartphones produced by Samsung Electronics. The Galaxy On5 was announced in October 2015 and released in November 2015, while the Galaxy On5 Pro was announced and released in July 2016. The main difference between the base and Pro models is their memory configuration.

== Specifications ==
=== Design ===
The front is made of glass, while the frame is made of matte plastic and the back is made of plastic with a leather-like texture.

On the bottom of the smartphones, there is the microUSB port, the 3.5 mm audio jack, and a microphone. On the left, there is the volume rocker while on the right, there is the power button. On the front, there is the screen with the logo, an earpiece speaker, a proximity sensor and a front-facing camera above it, and one physical ('home') and two touch-sensitive ('recent apps' and 'back') navigation buttons below the display. On the back, there is the logo, a rear-facing camera, an LED flash, and a speaker. Under the removable back, panel the user can find dual Micro-SIM slot (single Nano-SIM slot in the T-Mobile/MetroPCS Galaxy On5) with memory card slot.

The smartphones were available in Black and Gold color options.

=== Hardware ===
The phones are equipped with a 32-bit Exynos 3475 Quad SoC, which includes a quad-core CPU with four 1.3 GHz Cortex-A7 cores and a Mali-T720 GPU. The Galaxy On5 features 1.5 GB of memory and 8 GB of internal storage, while the Galaxy On5 Pro features 2 GB of memory and 16 GB of internal storage. The storage can be expanded by microSD card up to 128 GB.

The phones feature a 2600 mAh user-replaceable lithium-ion battery.

The smartphones have a 5-inch TFT LCD capacitive touchscreen display with an HD (1280 × 720 pixels) resolution, a 16:9 aspect ratio, a 294 ppi pixel density, and support for 16 million colors.

The smartphones feature an 8 MP rear-facing camera with an f/2.2 aperture, autofocus and a 5 MP front-facing camera. The T-mobile/MetroPCS version of the Galaxy On5 features a 5 MP rear-facing camera and a 2 MP front-facing camera.

=== Software ===
The Galaxy On5 was initially released with TouchWiz 5.1, which is based on Android 5.1.1 "Lollipop", while the Galaxy On5 for T-Mobile/MetroPCS and Galaxy On5 Pro were officially released with TouchWiz 6.0 based on Android 6.0.1 "Marshmallow". Later, the base Galaxy On5 was updated to Android 6.0.1 "Marshmallow" with TouchWiz 6.0.
