= Samsung Galaxy W =

Android Smartphone

Samsung Galaxy W (GT-I8150)
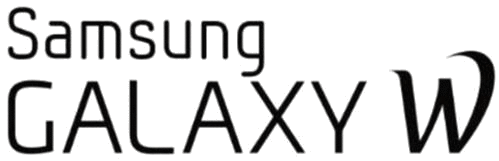

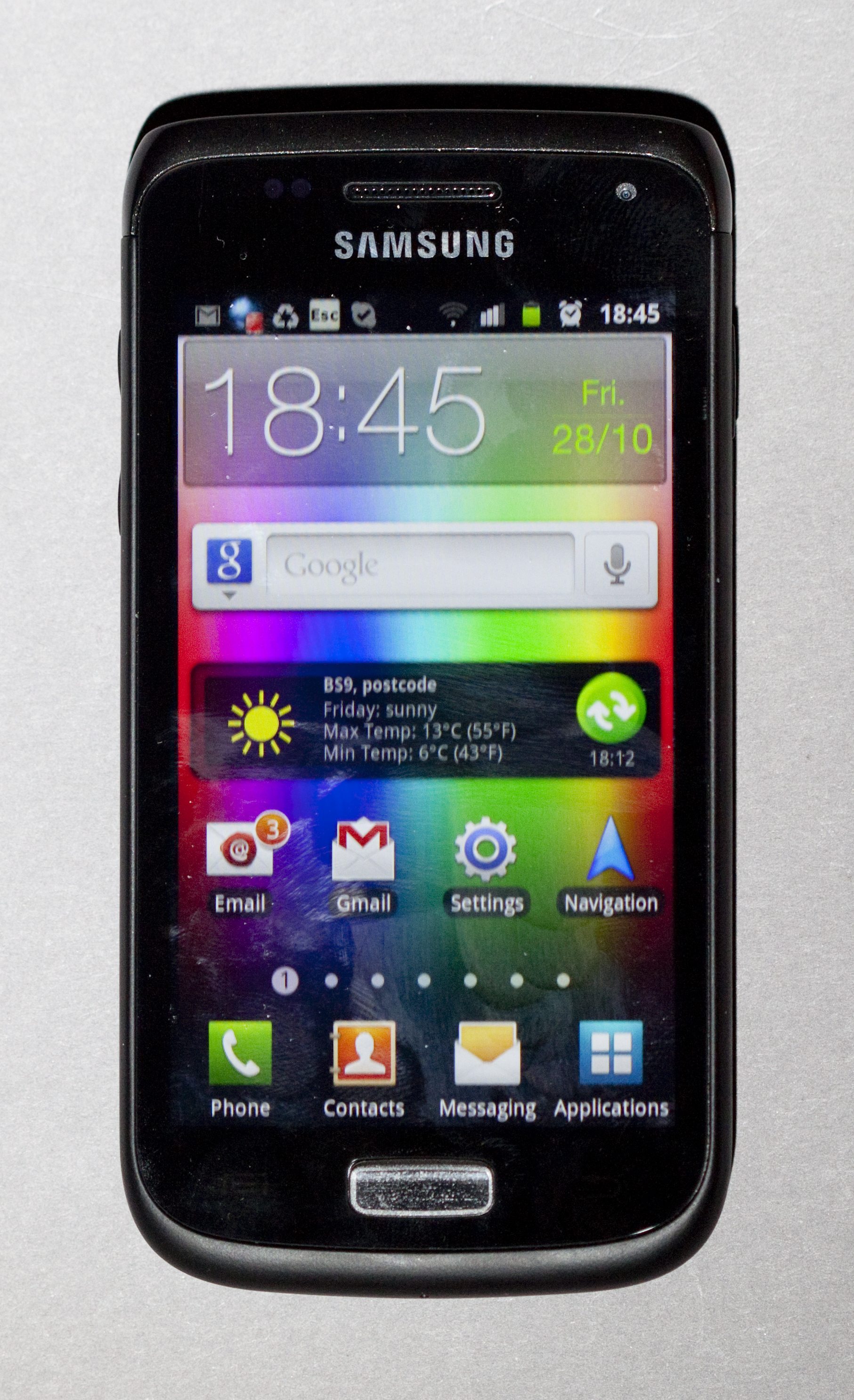
- Samsung Galaxy W I8150 displaying the 'homescreen' of TouchWiz 4.0
- Manufacturer: Samsung Electronics
- Type: Smartphone
- Series: I Series
- First released: 2011; 15 years ago
- Successor: Samsung Galaxy S III Mini
- Related: Samsung Galaxy S II, Samsung Galaxy Mini 2
- Compatible networks: GSM/GPRS 850/900/1800/1900 MHz; 3GUMTS/HSDPA 850/900/1900/2100 MHz
- Dimensions: 115.5 mm (4.55 in) H 59.8 mm (2.35 in) W 11.5 mm (0.45 in) D
- Weight: 110 g (3.9 oz)
- Operating system: Android 2.3 "Gingerbread" (Gingerbread) with TouchWiz UI 4.0
- CPU: 1.4 GHz single-core Qualcomm Scorpion MSM8255T Snapdragon SoC processor
- GPU: Adreno 205 GPU
- Memory: 512 MB RAM
- Storage: 4 GB flash memory
- Removable storage: microSD (up to 32 GB)
- Battery: Li-ion 1500 mA·h
- Rear camera: 5 Mpx with auto focus, 720p 30 fps HD video recording and stills Single LED flash
- Front camera: VGA for video chatting, video recording, and stills
- Display: 800×480 px, 9.34 cm (3.68 in) at 252 ppi WVGA TFT LCD
- Connectivity: 3.5 mm TRRS; Wi-Fi (802.11a/b/g/n); Wi-Fi Direct; Bluetooth 3.0; Micro-USB 2.0; DLNA, GPS;
- Data inputs: Multi-touch touch screen, headset controls, GP2A proximity, 3-axis gyroscope, AK8975 magnetometer and AK8975 orientation sensor, BMA222 accelerometer, aGPS, gravity sensor, rotation vector sensor and stereo FM-radio
- Model: GT-I8150
- Other: Exchange ActiveSync, integrated messaging Social Hub, Readers Hub, Music Hub, and Game Hub

The Samsung Galaxy W (i8150), also known as the Samsung Wonder, is an Android-based smartphone that is a smaller-sized variant of Samsung Galaxy S II.

Galaxy W is a less-powerful downgrade compared to Galaxy S II, with specifications comparable to the larger Galaxy R. The device has a 3.68 in (9.34 cm) WVGA capacitive TFT LCD touchscreen with a 480x800 px resolution. The phone also features a 5-megapixel still-image camera that is capable of 720p video capture.

The main differences between Galaxy W and other variants are its single-core CPU (1.4 GHz manufactured by Qualcomm), higher screen pixel density compared to Galaxy S II and Galaxy R, and a slightly different physical design.

Prior to the release of Galaxy S II, there were speculative reports of Samsung's plans for a smaller stripped-down variant, which is a similar case-example to HTC HD Mini existing as a smaller version of HTC HD2.

== Launch ==
First announced in August 2011, the Galaxy W made its market debut in October 2011.

== Hardware ==
=== Processor ===
The device uses a single-core 1.4 GHz Scorpion Qualcomm powered Snapdragon chip along with Adreno 205 for its GPU graphics.

=== Memory ===
The handset has a system memory of 1.07 Gigabytes,1.7 GB of USB Storage and a dedicated 351 Megabytes of RAM.

=== Display ===
The phone uses a 93.89-millimetre (3.696 in) WVGA TFT LCD capacitive touchscreen which has a Pixel density (PPI) of '252'. It has a higher pixel density than its high-end counterpart, the S2 which has a pixel density of 217 ppi.

=== Camera ===
On the back of the device is a 5-megapixel camera with single LED flash that can record videos in up to a maximum 720p high-definition (HD). There is also a fixed-focus front-facing VGA camera for video calling, taking photos, as well as general video recording.

=== Connectivity ===
Galaxy W features industry-standard connectivity, including Bluetooth 3.0, Assisted GPS (AGPS), Wi-Fi 802.11 b/g/n, as well as micro-USB connectivity for files transfer and PC charging. Also featured is a stereo FM radio with RDS along with a 3.5mm audio headphone socket located at the top of the device.

== Software ==
=== Android operating system ===
The Galaxy W ships with Android 2.3.6 installed.

=== User interface ===
The Galaxy W employs the latest proprietary Samsung TouchWiz 4.0 user interface.

=== Bundled applications ===
The Galaxy W, like the Galaxy S II, features the inclusion of Samsung's 'Hub' applications for various multimedia use. Included are:

Social Hub
Integrates popular social networking services like Facebook and Twitter into one place rather than in separate applications.
Readers Hub
Provides the ability to access, read and download online newspapers, e-books and magazines from a worldwide selection.
Music Hub
An application store for downloading and purchasing music on the device. Samsung has teamed up with 7digital to offer this service.
Game Hub
An application store for downloading and purchasing games. Samsung has teamed up with partners including Gameloft to offer this service.
Other applications
More applications include Samsung Kies, Kies Air, as well as Google Maps with Latitude, Places, Navigation.

=== Media support ===
The Galaxy W supports various audio formats including MP3, OGG, AAC, AAC+, eAAC+, AMR-NB, AMR-WB, WMA, WAV, MID, AC3, IMY, FLAC, XMF audio formats and video formats support for MPEG4, H.264, H.263, WMV, DivX, Xvid, VC-1. Recording & Playback of videos in up to 720p high-definition (HD).

== Other variants ==
The T-Mobile USA variant of Galaxy W is Samsung Exhibit II 4G (SGH-T679). It has a few hardware differences, including a 3 MP rear camera, and a 1 GHz Qualcomm Snapdragon S2 MSM8255 CPU. Samsung Exhibit II 4G was rebranded as Samsung Galaxy Exhibit 4G by a software update on May 30, 2012.

In 2014, T-Mobile sells an Exhibit version (SGH-599) through Walmart.

Another variant in some markets is Samsung Galaxy S2 Mini (not to be confused with Samsung Galaxy Mini 2).

== Reception ==
Dan Sung, reviewing the Galaxy W device for Pocket-lint.com, had further noted the amount of downgraded features. CNET UK briefly summarized the phone as "chunky" — in its small size dimensions, as well as "decent" for a lower-priced alternative to Galaxy S II.
