= Samsung Galaxy On8 =

2016 smartphone from Samsung

- Brand: Samsung
- Manufacturer: Samsung Electronics
- Type: Phablet
- Series: Samsung Galaxy On series
- Predecessor: Samsung Galaxy On7
- Successor: Samsung Galaxy On8 (2018)
- Related: Samsung Galaxy J7 (2016); Samsung Galaxy On5 (2016); Samsung Galaxy On7 (2016)
- Form factor: Slate
- Weight: 169 g (6 oz)
- Operating system: Android 6.0
- System-on-chip: Exynos 7580 Octa
- CPU: Octa-core 1.6 GHz Cortex-A53
- GPU: Mali-T720MP2
- Memory: 3GB RAM
- Storage: 16GB eMMC 5.0
- Removable storage: microSD, up to 256GB
- Battery: Removable Li-Ion 3300 mAh battery
- Rear camera: 13 MP
- Front camera: 5 MP
- Display: 5.5 in Full HD Super AMOLED (401 ppi)
- SAR: 0.47 W/kg (head) 1.78 W/kg (body)
- Website: www.samsung.com/in/smartphones/galaxy-on8-j710fn/

Samsung Galaxy On8 is an Android smartphone developed by Samsung Electronics. It was initially released in October 2016. The phone has 16GB of internal storage and 3GB of RAM. It also has an Octa-core 1.6 GHz Cortex-A53 CPU and a Mali-T720MP2 GPU.

== Specifications ==
=== Software ===
Originally, Galaxy On8 was shipped with Android 6.0.1 Marshmallow.

=== Hardware ===
The Samsung Galaxy On8 has 16GB of internal storage and 3GB of RAM. A microSD card can be inserted into the phone for up to 256GB of additional storage. The phone has an Octa-core 1.6 GHz Cortex-A53 CPU and a Mali-T720MP2 GPU. It has a 13 MP rear camera and a 5 MP front camera

== History ==
The Samsung Galaxy On8 was first announced in September 2016. It was released a month later in October.

== See also ==
- Samsung
- Samsung Electronics
- Samsung Galaxy
- Android
