= Samsung Galaxy On7 =

Android smartphone

Samsung Galaxy On7 Samsung Galaxy On7 Pro
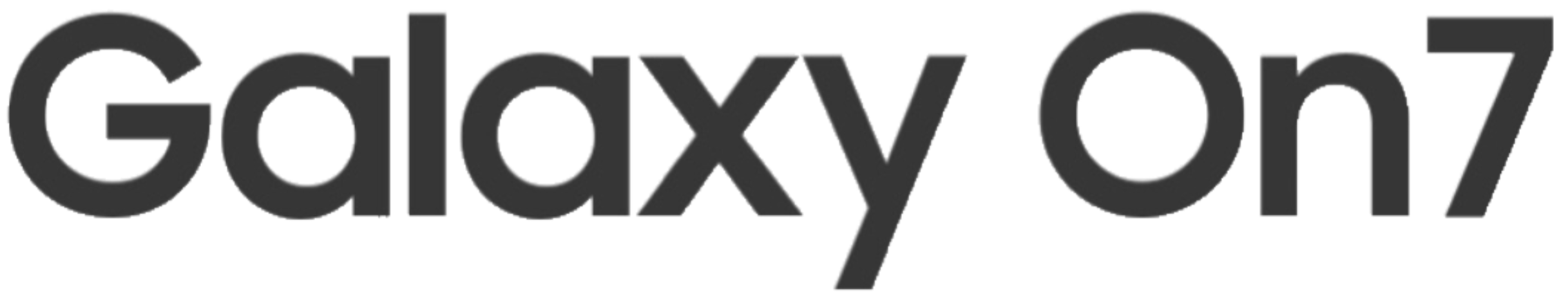
- Also known as: Samsung Galaxy Wide (in South Korea)
- Manufacturer: Samsung Electronics
- Type: Phablet
- Series: Galaxy On
- First released: On7: October 25, 2015; 10 years ago On7 Pro: July 12, 2016; 9 years ago
- Successor: Samsung Galaxy On7 (2016) / Samsung Galaxy On7 Prime; Samsung Galaxy On8; Samsung Galaxy Wide2
- Related: Samsung Galaxy On5
- Compatible networks: (GSM/HSPA/LTE); 2G: GSM GSM850, GSM900, DCS1800, PCS1900; 3G UMTS: B1(2100), B2(1900), B5(850), B8(900); 4G FDD LTE: B1(2100), B3(1800), B5(850), B8(900), B20(800); 4G TDD LTE: B40(2300)
- Form factor: Slate
- Colors: Black, White, Gold
- Dimensions: 151.8 mm (5.98 in) H 77.5 mm (3.05 in) W 8.2 mm (0.32 in) D
- Weight: 172 g (6.1 oz)
- Operating system: Original: On7: Android 5.1.1 "Lollipop" with TouchWiz 5.1; On7 Pro: Android 6.0.1 "Marshmallow" with TouchWiz 6.0; Current: Android 6.0.1 "Marshmallow" with TouchWiz 6.0.1
- System-on-chip: Qualcomm MSM8916 Snapdragon 410 (28 nm)
- CPU: Quad-core 1.2 GHz Cortex-A53
- GPU: Adreno 306
- Memory: On7: 1.5 GB; On7 Pro: 2 GB; LPDDR3
- Storage: On7: 8 GB; On7 Pro: 16 GB eMMC 4.5
- Removable storage: microSDXC up to 128 GB
- SIM: On7: hybrid dual SIM (Nano-SIM + Micro-SIM) or Single SIM (Nano-SIM); On7 Pro: hybrid dual SIM (Nano-SIM + Micro-SIM)
- Battery: Removable, Li-ion 3000 mAh
- Rear camera: 13 MP, f/2.1, AF; LED flash Video: 1080p@30fps
- Front camera: 5 MP, f/2.2 Video: 1080p@30fps
- Display: TFT LCD, 5.5 in (140 mm), 720 x 1280 pixels (267 ppi)
- Sound: Front earpiece, rear mono speaker
- Connectivity: List: Wi-Fi: 802.11 b/g/n (2.4 GHz) (Wi-Fi Direct); GPS/GLONASS; NFC; Bluetooth 4.1; USB 2.0 (Micro-B port, USB charging); 3.50 mm (0.138 in) headphone jack
- Model: On7: SM-G600S, SM-G6000, SM-G600F, SM-G600FY; On7 Pro: SM-G600FY
- SAR: SAR US: 0.79 W/kg (head); 0.90 W/kg (body); SAR EU: 0.38 W/kg (head); 0.54 W/kg (body)

The Samsung Galaxy On7 (known as the Samsung Galaxy Wide in South Korea) and Samsung Galaxy On7 Pro are Android smartphones produced by Samsung Electronics. The Galaxy On7 was unveiled and released in October 2015, while the Galaxy On7 Pro was unveiled and released in July 2016. The main difference between the base and Pro models is their memory configuration.

== Specifications ==
=== Design ===
The front is made of glass, while the frame is made of matte plastic and the back is made of plastic with a leather-like texture.

On the bottom of the smartphones, there is the microUSB port, the 3.5 mm audio jack, and a microphone. On the left, there is the volume rocker, while on the right, there is the power button. On the front, there is the screen with the logo, an earpiece speaker, a proximity sensor and a front-facing camera above it, and one physical ('home') and two touch-sensitive ('recent apps' and 'back') navigation buttons below the display. On the back, there is the logo, a rear-facing camera, an LED flash, and a speaker. Under the removable back panel, the user can find a hybrid dual SIM slots (Nano-SIM + Micro-SIM or Nano-SIM + memory card) or a single Nano-SIM slot depending on the Galaxy On7 model.

The smartphones were available in Black, White, and Gold color options.

=== Hardware ===
The phones are equipped with a 64-bit Qualcomm Snapdragon 410 SoC, which includes a quad-core CPU with four 1.2 GHz Cortex-A53 cores and an Adreno 306 GPU. The Galaxy On7 features 1.5 GB of memory and 8 GB of internal storage, while the Galaxy On7 Pro features 2 GB of memory and 16 GB of internal storage. The storage can be expanded by microSD card up to 128 GB.

The phones feature a 3000 mAh user-replaceable lithium-ion battery.

The smartphones have a 5.5-inch TFT LCD capacitive touchscreen display with an HD (1280 × 720 pixels) resolution, a 16:9 aspect ratio, a 267 ppi pixel density, and support for 16 million colors.

The smartphones feature a 13 MP rear-facing camera with an f/2.1 aperture, autofocus and a 5 MP front-facing camera with an f/2.2 aperture. Both cameras have the ability to record video at up to 1080p@30fps.

=== Software ===
The Galaxy On7 was initially released with TouchWiz 5.1, which is based on Android 5.1.1 "Lollipop", while the Galaxy On7 Pro was officially released with TouchWiz 6.0 based on Android 6.0.1 "Marshmallow". Later, the Galaxy On7 was updated to Android 6.0.1 "Marshmallow" with TouchWiz 6.0.
