= Samsung Galaxy Avant =

Smartphone

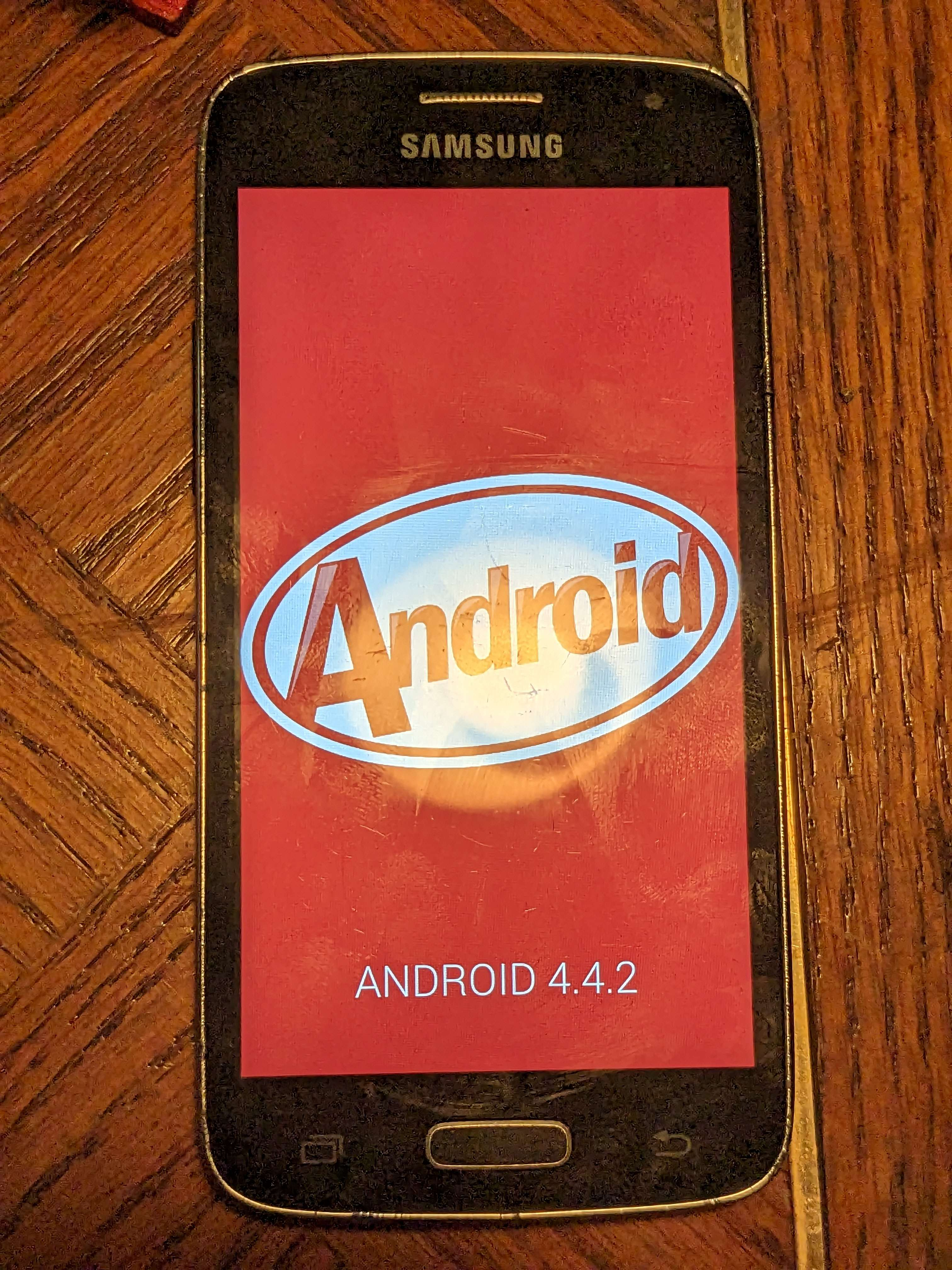
- Manufacturer: Samsung Electronics
- Type: Smartphone
- Series: Samsung Galaxy
- First released: July 2014
- Compatible networks: GSM, HSPA, LTE
- Form factor: Slate
- Dimensions: 132.9×66.0×9.9 mm (5.23×2.60×0.39 in)
- Weight: 136.9 g (5 oz)
- Operating system: Official: Android 4.4.2 "KitKat"; Unofficial: Android 14 "Upside Down Cake" via LineageOS 21 by greggit1986
- System-on-chip: Qualcomm Snapdragon 400 (MSM8226)
- CPU: ARM Cortex-A7 Quad-core 1.2 GHz
- GPU: Adreno 305
- Memory: 1.5 GB
- Storage: 16 GB
- Battery: Removable 2100 mAh Li-ion battery
- Rear camera: 5 MP
- Display: 4.5 inch 540 x 960 TFT LCD
- Connectivity: Wi-Fi b/g/n, Bluetooth 4.0, GPS, microUSB 2.0
- Data inputs: Capacitive touchscreen
- Model: SM-G386T, SM-G386T1, SM-G386W
- Website: Galaxy Avant

The Samsung Galaxy Avant (also known as the Samsung Galaxy Core LTE in Canada or Samsung Galaxy Core 4G on Vidéotron) is a mid-range smartphone released by Samsung in July 2014. It was only available on the T-Mobile network in the United States, although it could be purchased both on and off contract. This phone retailed for $230, making it one of the cheaper offerings by T-Mobile. While the phone was praised for its low price and decent performance, it was also criticized for its poor screen and camera. The display was often cited as having washed out colors and a lack of sharpness, likely as a result of the TFT panel used. The Galaxy Avant received a few official software updates, but was never upgraded past Android KitKat.

== Specifications ==
The Samsung Galaxy Avant comes with a 4.5-inch TFT display with a resolution of 540 x 960 pixels and a 16:9 ratio. The phone is powered by the Qualcomm Snapdragon 400 chipset paired with the Adreno 305 GPU. It ships with 16GB of storage and 1.5GB of RAM. It has a removable 2100 mAh Li-ion battery. The phone runs on the Android KitKat operating system.

== Rooting & Custom ROMs ==
Soon after the release of this phone, a method to gain root access on the Galaxy Avant was discovered. In order to root the phone, a root package must be flashed through Odin on a PC, which can then be used to flash a custom recovery, allowing for further ROMs to be flashed. The Galaxy Avant has a ROM for Android 5.1.1, but the phone's camera and gyroscope are non functional. It did not receive any ROM for Android Marshmallow, Nougat or Oreo, however, it did receive a modified ROM that provided some of the design and functionality of Android Marshmallow. In August 2023, a port of Android Pie via LineageOS 16 was released by an XDA user named "greggit1986", and an Android 10 and Android 11 ROM (based on LineageOS 17.1 and LineageOS 18.1 respectively) would be released by greggit1986 a month later. In January 2024, greggit1986 released Android 12L, based on LineageOS 19.1, followed by Android 13, based on LineageOS 20. In April 2024, the Galaxy Avant would receive Android 14, based on LineageOS 21.
