= J3 =

J3, J03, J 3 or J-3 may refer to:

== Aircraft and airlines ==
- Junkers J 3, a German experimental fighter aircraft
- J-class blimp, a class of US Navy airships
- Ishikawajima-Harima J3, a Japanese turbojet aircraft engine
- Piper J-3 Cub, a light aircraft
- Northwestern Air, a Canadian airline, IATA code J3

== Roads and vehicles ==
- County Route J3 (California), in the United States
- Kempas Highway and Jalan Datin Halimah, Johor State Route J3 in Malaysia
- JAC J3, a subcompact car

== Ships and submarines ==
- J3, a design type of Junsen type submarine of the Imperial Japanese Navy
- HMS J3, later HMAS J3, a J-class submarine
- J3 battlecruiser, a design study for the Royal Navy's 1921 Fleet modernization programme

== Other uses ==
- J_{3}, the main perturbing force to be counteracted in order to have a frozen orbit in orbital mechanics
- Janko group J_{3}, in mathematics
- J3 League, in the Japan Professional Football League
- LNER Class J3, a class of British steam locomotives
- Nikon 1 J3, a camera
- J3, the operations branch of joint military staff
- Samsung Galaxy J3 (2016), a smartphone
  - Samsung Galaxy J3 Pro
- Triangular cupola, Johnson Solid number 3

== See also ==
- 3J (disambiguation)
