= Samsung Galaxy J1 =

Android smartphone by Samsung

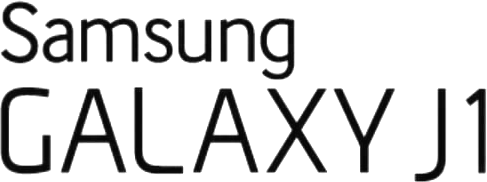
- Manufacturer: Samsung Electronics
- Type: Smartphone
- Series: Galaxy J series
- First released: January 2015
- Availability by region: 2015–2019
- Predecessor: Samsung Galaxy Young 2
- Successor: Samsung Galaxy J1 (2016)
- Related: Samsung Galaxy J1 Ace/Ace Neo; Samsung Galaxy J2; Samsung Galaxy J5; Samsung Galaxy J7
- Compatible networks: 2G GSM 850, 900, 1800, 1900; 3G HSDPA 900, 2100; 4G LTE Bands 1, 3, 7, 8, 20 (4G models only)
- Form factor: Slate
- Dimensions: 129 mm (5.1 in) H 68.2 mm (2.69 in) W 8.9 mm (0.35 in) D
- Weight: 122 g (4.3 oz)
- Operating system: Android 4.4.4 "KitKat"; TouchWiz; Android 5.1.1 "Lollipop"; TouchWiz (Verizon only); Unofficial: Android 7.1.2 "Nougat" by LineageOS 14.1 [SM-J100H only]
- System-on-chip: Spreadtrum SC7727S; Marvell PXA1908 (4G)
- CPU: Dual-core (2×1.2 GHz) ARM Cortex-A7; Quad-core (4×1.2 GHz) ARM Cortex-A7 (4G)
- GPU: ARM Mali-400; Vivante GC7000UL (4G)
- Memory: 512 MB; 768 MB (4G)
- Storage: 4 GB
- Removable storage: microSD up to 256 GB
- Battery: 1850 mAh (removable)
- Rear camera: 5 MP f/2.2
- Front camera: 2 MP
- Display: 4.3", 480×800 px (217 ppi) TFT LCD
- Sound: Loudspeaker, 3.5 mm headphone jack
- Connectivity: WLAN 802.11 b/g/n, Wi-Fi, Bluetooth 4.0, GPS, microUSB 2.0
- Data inputs: Accelerometer, Proximity sensor
- Model: SM-J100x; SM-J120G (4G) (x varies by region and carrier)
- Codename: j13g (SM-J100H) j1xlte
- Development status: Discontinued
- SAR: 0.65 W/kg (head), 0.87 W/kg (body)
- Hearing aid compatibility: yes
- Other: FM radio, Dual SIM (Dual models only)
- Website: Galaxy J1 4G

The Samsung Galaxy J1 is an Android smartphone developed by Samsung Electronics. It was released in January 2015 and is the first phone of the Galaxy J series. It was marketed as an entry-level device starting at $100.

== History ==
The Galaxy J1 was announced in January 2015 as the first model of the J series. The 3G model was released in February 2015, the 4G model one month after. In the following months Samsung launched more smartphones bearing the J1 name such as the J1 Ace/Ace Neo, J1 Nxt/mini and J1 mini prime.

In January 2016, the successor Galaxy J1 (2016) was released.

== Specifications ==
=== Hardware ===
The Samsung Galaxy J1 was available in a 3G and a 4G version. Both models have an ARM Cortex-A7 CPU with either two (3G) or four cores (4G) with 512 MB (3G) or 768 MB (4G) of RAM respectively, and 4 GB of internal storage. The phone also has a slot for a microSD card (up to 256 gigabytes) and dual SIM card support. The rear camera's resolution is 5 megapixels while the front camera is 2 megapixels and both film video at 720p 30 fps.

=== Software ===
The J1 shipped with Android 4.4.4 "KitKat" and Samsung's TouchWiz user interface. The original model never got updated to Android Lollipop, but got an unofficial Android 7.1.2 "Nougat" custom firmware port on XDA-Developers.

An unofficial port of TWRP exists for this device.

Verizon released a special branded J1 4G. It's shipped with Android 5.0.2 "Lollipop" which is upgradable to 5.1.1 as of September 2015.

== See also ==
- Samsung Galaxy
- Samsung Galaxy J series
