= Samsung Galaxy J1 Ace =

Lower mid-range smartphone

Samsung Galaxy J1 Ace Samsung Galaxy J1 Ace Neo/Ace VE
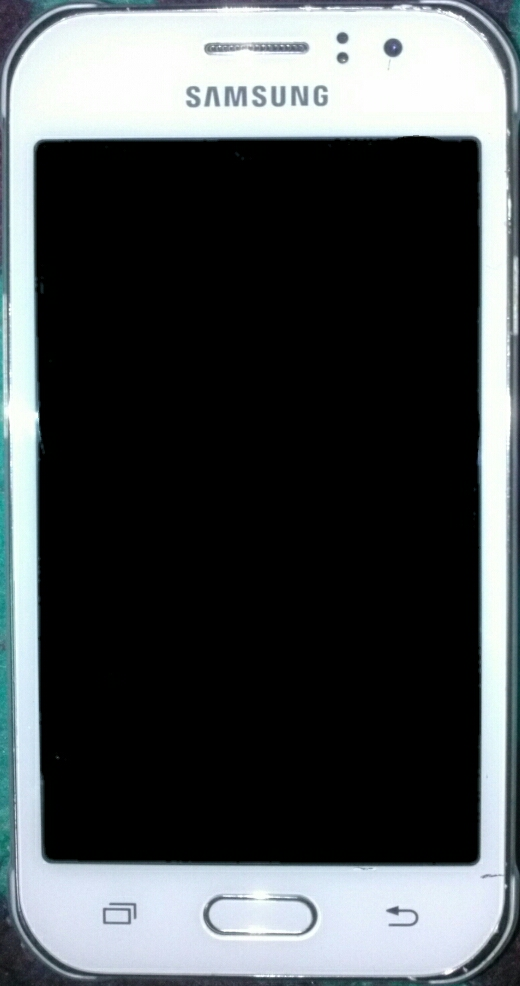
- Samsung Galaxy J1 Ace in White
- Manufacturer: Samsung Electronics
- Type: Smartphone
- Series: Galaxy J series
- First released: September 2015
- Discontinued: 2018
- Predecessor: Samsung Galaxy Ace 4
- Successor: Samsung Galaxy J1 (2016); Samsung Galaxy J2 Prime (Galaxy J2 Ace in India and Asian markets)
- Related: Samsung Galaxy J1; Samsung Galaxy J1 Mini
- Compatible networks: 2G GSM 850, 900, 1800, 1900; 3G HSDPA 850, 900, 1700, 1900, 2100; 4G LTE Bands 1, 2, 3, 5, 7, 8, 17, 20, 28, 40
- Form factor: Slate
- Dimensions: 130.1 mm (5.12 in) H 67.6 mm (2.66 in) W 9.5 mm (0.37 in) D
- Weight: 131 g (4.6 oz)
- Operating system: J1 Ace: Android 4.4.4 "KitKat"; TouchWiz Essence UX, upgradable to Android 5.1.1 "Lollipop"; TouchWiz 5.1; J1 Ace Neo/Ace VE: Android 5.1.1 "Lollipop"; TouchWiz 5.1, upgradable to Android 6.0.1 "Marshmallow"; TouchWiz 6.0
- System-on-chip: J1 Ace Neo/Ace VE: Marvell PXA1908; J1 Ace: Spreadtrum SC7727S
- CPU: Quad-core (4×1.2 GHz) ARM Cortex-A7 dual-core (2×1.3 GHz) ARM Cortex-A53 quad-core (4×1.5 GHz) ARM Cortex-A7 (J1 Ace Neo)
- GPU: ARM Mali-400MP2; Vivante GC700 UL
- Memory: 512 MB; 768 MB; 1 GB
- Storage: 4 or 8 GB
- Removable storage: microSD up to 128 GB
- Battery: 1900 mAh (removable)
- Rear camera: 5 MP f/2.2
- Front camera: 2 MP
- Display: 4.3", 480×800 px, Super AMOLED (~217 ppi)
- Connectivity: WLAN 802.11 b/g/n, Bluetooth 4.0, GPS/GLONASS, microUSB 2.0
- Data inputs: Accelerometer, Proximity sensor
- Model: SM-J11x (J1 Ace Neo); SM-J110H/SM-J110L ("J1 Ace DUOS") (x varies by region and carrier)
- Codename: J1 Ace Neo: j1acelte (SM-J111x); J1 Ace: j1pop3g (SM-J110H/SM-J110L)
- Other: FM radio, Dual SIM (Duos model only)

The Samsung Galaxy J1 Ace is a lower mid-range smartphone manufactured by Samsung Electronics as part of the Galaxy J series.

== Specifications ==
=== Hardware ===
The J1 Ace features a Marvell PXA1908 SoC including a dual-core 1.2 GHz ARM Cortex-A53 and 512 MB of RAM and 4 GB internal storage. It is available with either 4 or 8 GB of internal storage with support for removable microSD cards of up to 128 GB.

The cameras of the J1 Ace are a 5 megapixel main camera with LED flash and a 2 megapixel front-facing camera. Both can record 720p video at 30fps.

The dual-SIM model (SM-J110H/SM-J110L) features a Spreadtrum SC7727S SoC with a quad-core 1.2 GHz ARM Cortex-A7 CPU and either 768 MB or 1 GB of RAM.

=== Software ===
The J1 Ace (SM-J11x/j1acex) was originally shipped with Android 5.1.1 "Lollipop" with Samsung's TouchWiz user interface. An official release of TWRP exists for this device.

The J1 Ace DUOS (SM-J110H/SM-J110L) was originally shipped with Android 4.4.4 "KitKat" with Samsung's TouchWiz user interface. An official release of TWRP exists for this device.

== Samsung Galaxy J1 Ace Neo ==
At 11 July 2016, Samsung released an updated version of the J1 Ace named J1 Ace Neo (J1 Ace VE in North Africa). It features a quad-core 1.5 GHz CPU with 1 GB of RAM. The rest of the specs remain the same, the model number is SM-J111F.
