= Samsung Galaxy J5 Prime =

2016 Android-based smartphone by Samsung Electronics

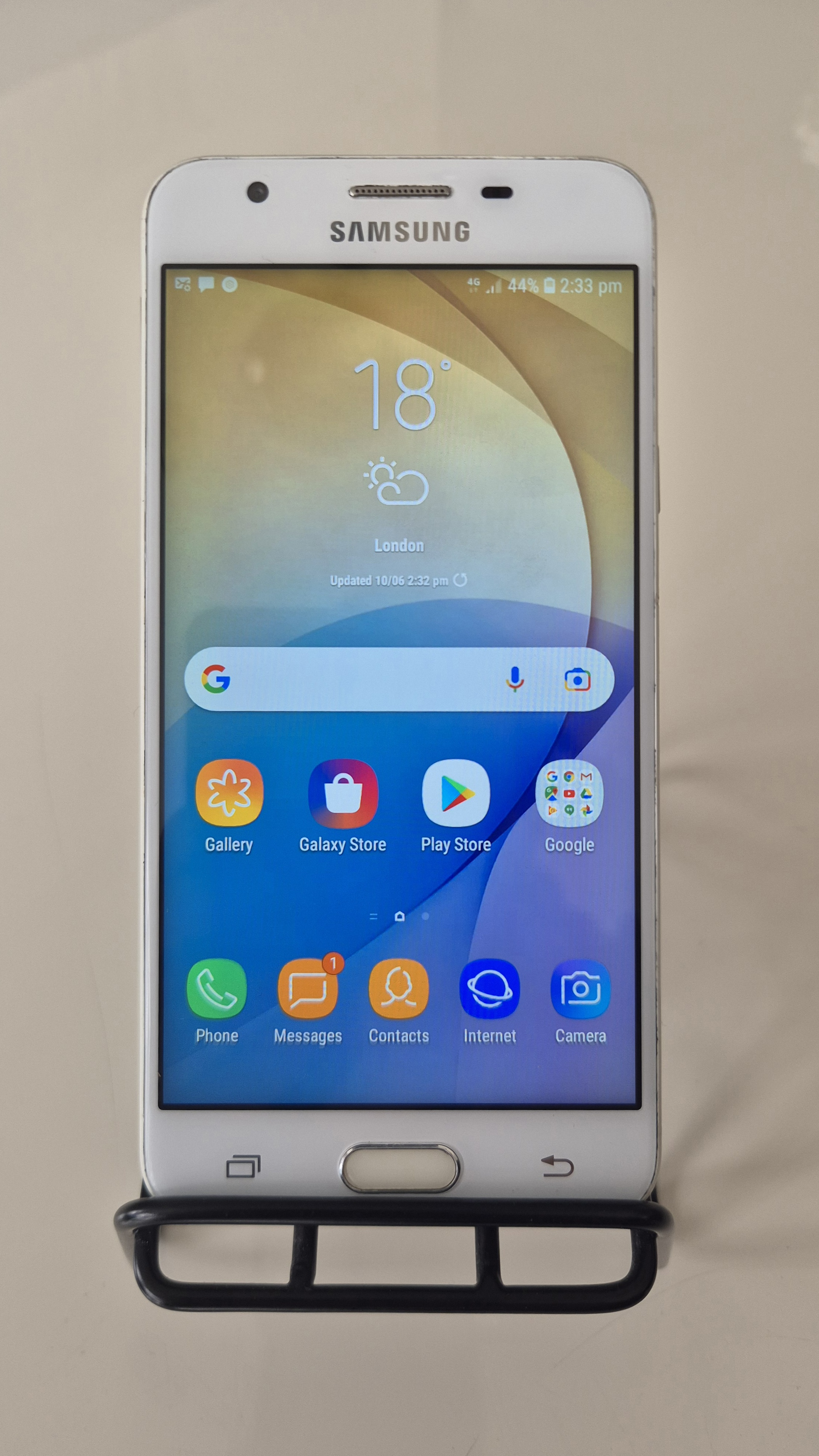
- Samsung Galaxy J5 Prime
- Brand: Samsung
- Manufacturer: Samsung Electronics
- Type: Smartphone
- Series: Galaxy J
- Family: Samsung Galaxy
- First released: September 2016; 10 years ago
- Availability by region: October 2016; 10 years ago
- Predecessor: Samsung Galaxy J5 (2016)
- Successor: Samsung Galaxy J5 (2017)
- Related: Samsung Galaxy J7 Prime; Samsung Galaxy J7 V
- Compatible networks: GSM / HSPA / LTE
- Form factor: Slate
- Dimensions: 142.8×69.5×8.1 mm (5.62×2.74×0.32 in)
- Weight: 143 g (5 oz)
- Operating system: Android 6.0.1 (Marshmallow), upgradable to Android 8.0 (Oreo)
- System-on-chip: Exynos 7570 Quad
- CPU: Quad-core 1.4 GHz ARM Cortex‑A53
- GPU: Mali‑T720 MP2
- Memory: 2 GB RAM
- Storage: 16 or 32 GB internal
- Removable storage: microSD (dedicated slot)
- Battery: Li-Ion 2400 mAh (non‑removable)
- Rear camera: 13 MP, f/1.9, autofocus, LED flash
- Front camera: 5 MP, f/2.2
- Display: 5.0 in PLS LCD, 720×1280 pixels (~294 ppi)
- Connectivity: Wi‑Fi 802.11 b/g/n, Bluetooth 4.2, GPS
- Model: SM-G570F (South Africa); SM-G570F/DD (India); SM-G5700 (Hong Kong); SM-G570Y (Australia); SM-G570M (Latin America)
- Development status: Discontinued

Samsung Galaxy J5 Prime is an entry‑level Android-based smartphone manufactured and developed by Samsung Electronics as part of its Galaxy J series. It was announced in September 2016 and released in October 2016, offering a balanced design and performance for budget‑conscious consumers in emerging markets.

== History ==
The Galaxy J5 Prime followed the earlier Samsung Galaxy J5 model with design refinements and updated internals intended to meet the demands of users in developing markets. Its launch marked another step in Samsung’s strategy to expand its affordable smartphone lineup.

== Design ==
The device features a sleek construction with a glass front protected by Gorilla Glass, an aluminum frame, and a composite back panel. With its compact 5.0‑inch display and slim profile (142.8×69.5×8.1 mm, 8.1 mm thick), the Galaxy J5 Prime combines modern aesthetics with ergonomic handling ideal for everyday use.

== Hardware ==
The Galaxy J5 Prime is powered by the Exynos 7570 Quad system-on-chip, which integrates a quad‑core 1.4 GHz ARM Cortex‑A53 CPU paired with a Mali‑T720 MP2 GPU. The device comes with 2 GB of RAM and offers internal storage options of either 16 or 32 GB, expandable via a dedicated microSD slot.

=== Display ===
The device features a 5.0‑inch PLS LCD screen with a resolution of 720×1280 pixels (~294 ppi), delivering clear imaging for multimedia and apps.

=== Camera ===
The rear camera is a 13‑megapixel sensor with an f/1.9 aperture, autofocus, and LED flash, while the front camera is a 5‑megapixel shooter, designed for selfies.

=== Battery ===
The Samsung Galaxy J5 Prime has a battery capacity of 2400 mAh, lower than other models in the Galaxy J series (for example the J7 Prime has 3300 mAh and the J2 Prime has 2600 mAh).

=== Connectivity ===
Standard connectivity features include GSM, HSPA, LTE, Wi‑Fi (802.11 b/g/n), Bluetooth 4.2, and GPS functionalities.

== Software ==
The device originally shipped with Android 6.0.1 Marshmallow. Subsequent updates brought the operating system to Android 8.0 Oreo, enhancing both the user interface and security while maintaining the familiar Android experience prized by budget‑smartphone users.

== Variants ==
Samsung released the Galaxy J5 Prime in several configurations. Notable model variants include SM‑G570F and SM‑G570Y, with select versions offering dual‑SIM support and 32GB storage option.

== See also ==
- Samsung Galaxy J series
- Samsung Galaxy J5
