= Samsung Galaxy J3 Prime =

Android smartphone by Samsung

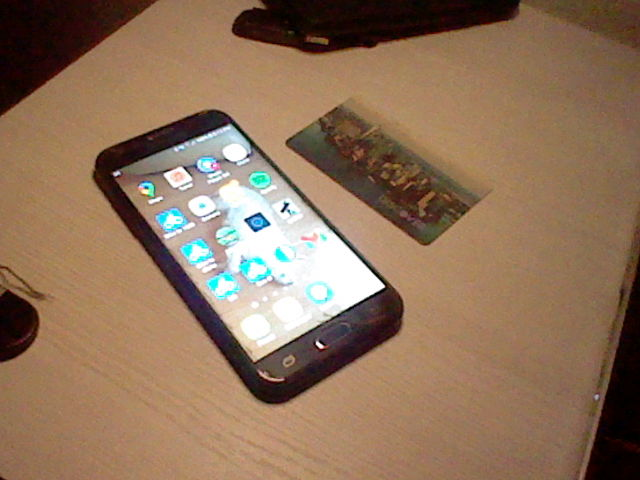
- A Samsung J3 Prime phone, with credit card for scale.
- Manufacturer: Samsung Electronics
- Type: Smartphone
- Series: Galaxy J series
- First released: January 2017; 9 years ago
- Discontinued: 2018
- Predecessor: Galaxy J3 (2016)
- Successor: Galaxy J3 (2018)
- Related: Galaxy J3 (2017)
- Compatible networks: 2G GSM 850, 900, 1800, 1900; 3G HSDPA 850, 1700, 1900; 4G LTE Bands 2, 4, 5, 12, 25, 26, 41
- Form factor: Slate
- Dimensions: 140.9 mm (5.55 in) H 70.1 mm (2.76 in) W 8.7 mm (0.34 in) D
- Weight: 147 g (5.2 oz)
- Operating system: Android 7.0 "Nougat"; Samsung Experience 8.1
- System-on-chip: Qualcomm Snapdragon 430; Qualcomm Snapdragon 425; Exynos 7570
- CPU: Octa-core (8×1.4 GHz) ARM Cortex-A53; Quad-core (4×1.4 GHz) ARM Cortex-A53
- GPU: Adreno 505; Adreno 308; ARM Mali-T720
- Memory: 1.5 GB
- Storage: 16 GB
- Removable storage: microSD up to 256 GB
- Battery: 2600 mAh
- Rear camera: 5 MP, f/1.9
- Front camera: 2 MP, f/.2.2
- Display: 5.0", 720×1280 px (294 ppi) TFT LCD
- Connectivity: WLAN 802.11a/b/g/n, Bluetooth 4.2, GPS/GLONASS, microUSB 2.0, 3.5 mm headphone jack
- Data inputs: Accelerometer, proximity sensor, gyroscope, compass
- Model: SM-J327x (x varies by carrier and region)
- Other: FM radio

The Samsung Galaxy J3 Prime (also known as Galaxy J3 Emerge, Galaxy J3 Eclipse, Galaxy Express Prime 2, Galaxy Amp Prime 2, and Galaxy J3 Luna Pro) is an Android smartphone manufactured by Samsung Electronics and was released in January 2017. It is mainly used as branded phone by mobile carriers.

== Specifications ==
=== Hardware ===
The Galaxy J3 Prime features a 5.0-inch TFT LCD with HD ready (720x1280 pixels) resolution. The 5 MP rear camera features f/1.9 aperture, autofocus, LED flash and HDR. The 2 MP front camera has f/2.2 aperture.

All models have 1.5 GB RAM and 16 GB of internal storage which can be upgraded up to 256 GB via microSD card. The phone has a 2600 mAh removable battery. There are differences at the SoC which are differentiated down below:

Sprint

The Sprint-branded Galaxy J3 Emerge is powered by a Qualcomm Snapdragon 430 SoC including an octa-core 1.4 GHz ARM Cortex-A53 CPU and an Adreno 505 GPU.

AT&T, T-Mobile

The Galaxy Express Prime 2 (AT&T) and Galaxy J3 Prime (T-Mobile/MetroPCS) features an Exynos 7570 SoC including a quad-core 1.4 GHz Cortex-A53 CPU and an ARM Mali-T720 GPU.

Boost Mobile, Cricket, Verizon

The Galaxy J3 Eclipse (Verizon), Galaxy Amp Prime 2 (Cricket) and Galaxy J3 Emerge (Boost Mobile) are powered by an Snapdragon 425 SoC including a quad-core 1.4 GHz Cortex-A53 CPU and an Adreno 308 GPU.

=== Software ===
The J3 Prime is shipped with Android 6.0 "Marshmallow" and Samsung's TouchWiz user interface. AT&T and Cricket branded phones are shipped with Android 7.0 "Nougat" and Samsung Experience.

== See also ==
- Samsung Galaxy
- Samsung Galaxy J series
