= Samsung Galaxy J7 =

Android smartphone by Samsung

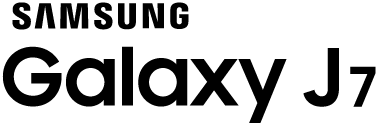

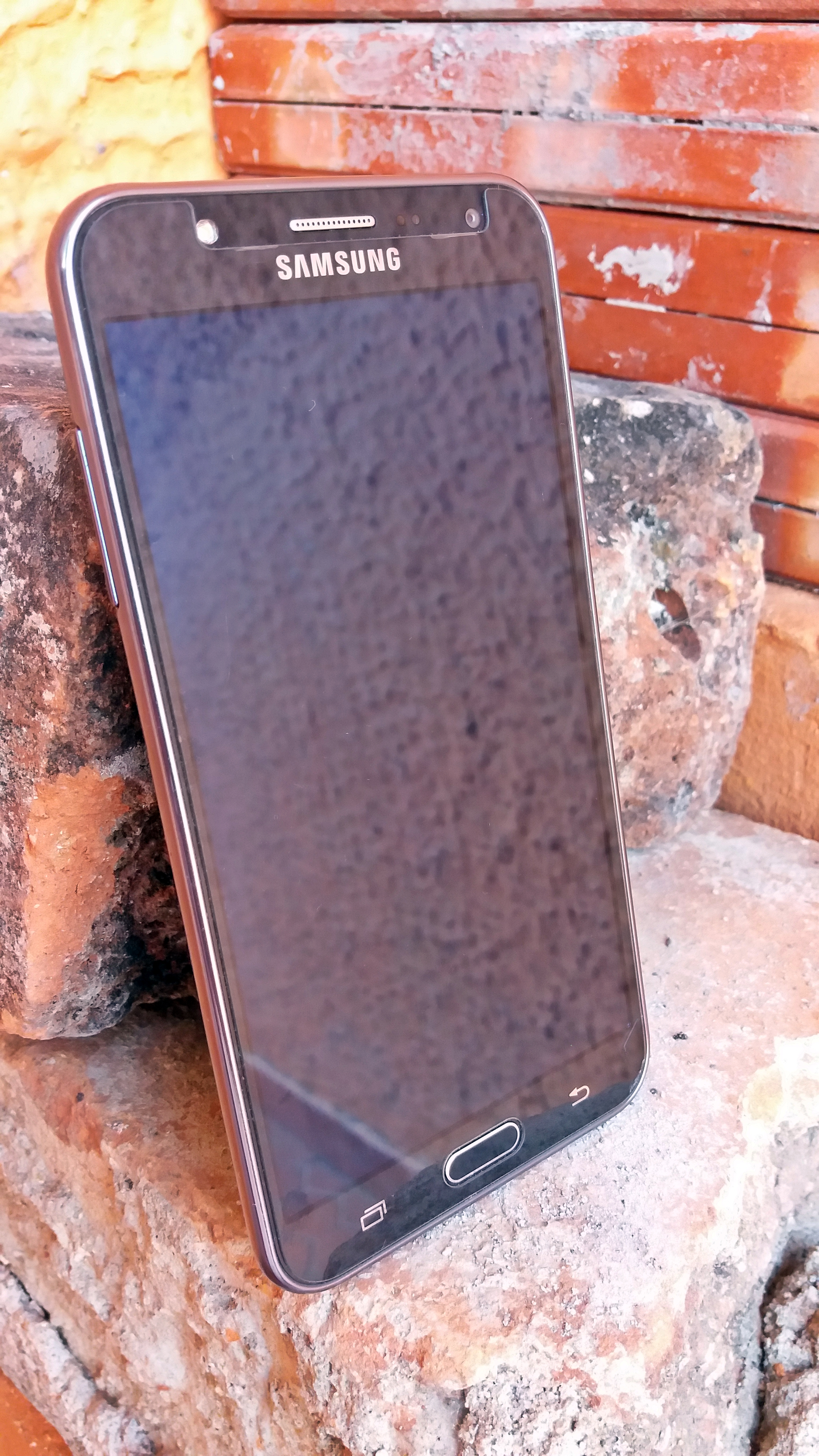
- Samsung Galaxy J7 J700M/DS Latin American version
- Manufacturer: Samsung Electronics
- Type: Touchscreen
- Series: Galaxy J
- First released: 26 June 2015 (USA, India, China, Latin America, Eastern Europe); September 2017 (J7 Core/J7 Nxt)
- Discontinued: 2018
- Successor: Samsung Galaxy J7 (2016)
- Related: Samsung Galaxy A7; Samsung Galaxy E7; Samsung Galaxy J1; Samsung Galaxy J2; Samsung Galaxy J5
- Compatible networks: (GSM/HSPA/LTE); 2G: GSM850, GSM900, DCS1800, PCS1900; 3G UMTS: B1(2100), B2(1900), B5(850), B7(2600), B8(900); 4G FDD LTE: B1(2100), B3(1800), B4(AWS), B5(850), B7(2600), B8(900), B20(800); 4G TDD LTE: B40(2300)
- Form factor: Phablet
- Dimensions: 152.2 mm (5.99 in) H 78.7 mm (3.10 in) W 7.5 mm (0.30 in) D
- Weight: 171 g (6.03 oz)
- Operating system: First-gen J7: SM-J700F, SM-J700H, SM-J700M: Original: Android 5.1.1 "Lollipop" Current: Android 6.0.1 "Marshmallow" Unofficial: Android 10 via LineageOS; SM-J700P, SM-J700T, SM-J700T1: Original: Android 6.0.1 "Marshmallow" Current: Android 7.1.1 "Nougat"; Upgradable to Android 9 "Pie" at least, for SM-J701F (Samsung Galaxy J7 Core)
- Memory: First-gen J7: SM-J700F, SM-J700H, SM-J700M: 1.5 GB LPDDR3 RAM; SM-J700P, SM-J700T, SM-J700T1: 2 GB LPDDR3 RAM; J7 Core/J7 Nxt/J7 Neo 2 GB LPDDR3 RAM, 3 GB LPDDR3 RAM
- Storage: 8GB, 16GB, 32GB (in various markets)
- Removable storage: microSD up to 128 GB J7 Core/J7 Nxt/J7 Neo microSD up to 256 GB
- Battery: 3000 mAh 11.55 Wh, 3.85 V Li-Ion removable battery Format: 1ICP5/64/75 Models: EB-BJ700BBC (Note: SM-J700H); EB-BJ700BBU (Note: SM-J700P, SM-J700T, SM-J700T1) (Note: This battery model comes with an integrated NFC antenna.); EB-BJ700CBB (Note: SM-J700M); EB-BJ700CBC; EB-BJ700CBE (Note: SM-J700H, SM-J700M); EB-BJ700CBN (Note: SM-J700F); EB-BJ700CBT
- Rear camera: 13 MP, 4128 × 3096 pixels, autofocus, LED flash: Features = Geo-tagging, touch focus, face detection; Video = 1080p@30fps
- Front camera: 5 megapixels (1080p) HD video recording @ 30 fps back-illuminated sensor, LED flash
- Display: 5.5 in (140 mm) 720 x 1280 pixels (267 ppi) Super AMOLED
- Connectivity: List: Wi-Fi :802.11 b/g/n (2.4/5 GHz); Wi-Fi Direct; Wi-Fi hotspot; DLNA; GPS/GLONASS; Bluetooth 4.1; USB 2.0 (Micro-B port, USB charging) USB OTG; 3.50 mm (0.138 in) headphone jack; NFC (SM-J7008, SM-J700P, SM-J700T, SM-J700T1; not available for J7 Core/J7 Neo/J7 Nxt)
- Model: First-gen J7: SM-J700F (India, UAE, Turkey); SM-J700M (Colombia, Argentina, Mexico, Panama, Peru, Chile, Ecuador, Bolivia, Uruguay); SM-J7008 (China, Hong Kong); SM-J700K (South Korea.KT); SM-J700H "3G HSPA+" (Russia, Venezuela, Ukraine); SM-J700T (T-Mobile USA); SM-J700T1 (MetroPCS); SM-J700P (Boost Mobile, Virgin Mobile, Sprint USA); Relaunched J7: SM-J701x (as J7 Nxt/J7 Core/J7 Neo in select countries; last letter varies with carrier and international models)
- Codename: j7elte (SM-J700F, SM-J700M); j7e3g (SM-J700H); j7ltespr (SM-J700P); j7eltetmo (SM-J700T); j7eltemtr (SM-J700T1); j7ltechn (SM-J7008); j75ltektt (SM-J700K)
- Website: Official Website

The Samsung Galaxy J7 is a mid-range Android-based smartphone produced by Samsung Electronics in 2015. In Latin America, Galaxy J7 (SM-J700M) was being sold alongside the Galaxy S5 Neo (SM-G903M), which shares same Exynos 7580 Octa SoC.

== Specifications ==
=== Hardware ===
The phone has versions with 1.5 GB of RAM and 8/16/32 GB internal storage that can be expanded with a MicroSD card up to 128 GB. It has 13-megapixel primary camera and 5-megapixel front camera with LED flash. It has a 5.5-inch HD (720×1280 pixels) Super AMOLED capacitive touchscreen.

==== SoC ====
- SM-J700F / H / M / T / T1 models: Exynos 7580
- South Korea KT model (SM-J700K): Snapdragon 410
- CDMA model (SM-J700P, SM-J7008): Snapdragon 415

==== CPU ====
- SM-J700F / H / M / T / T1 models: Octa-core ARM Cortex-A53 1.5 GHz
- South Korea KT model (SM-J700K): 4× ARM Cortex-A53 1.2 GHz
- CDMA model (SM-J700P, SM-J7008): 4× ARM Cortex-A53 1.4 GHz + 4x ARM Cortex-A53 1.1 GHz

==== GPU ====
- SM-J700F / H / M / T / T1 models: Mali-T720MP2
- South Korea KT model (SM-J700K): Adreno 306
- CDMA model (SM-J700P, SM-J7008): Adreno 405

=== Software ===
This phone was released with Android 5.1.1 Lollipop. Android 6.0.1 Marshmallow update was made available for SM-J700F on 28 July 2016 in India. Android 6.0.1 Marshmallow update is also available for J700H and M in Pakistan and Panama. Android 7.1 Nougat was released for the models that came Android 6.0.1 Marshmallow pre-installed.

== See also ==
- Samsung Galaxy
- Samsung Galaxy J
- Samsung Galaxy J3
- Samsung Galaxy J5

== Notes ==
Preceded by	Samsung Galaxy J7 (2015)	Succeeded by Samsung Galaxy J7 (2016)
