= Samsung Galaxy J2 =

Smartphone model made by Samsung Electronics in 2015

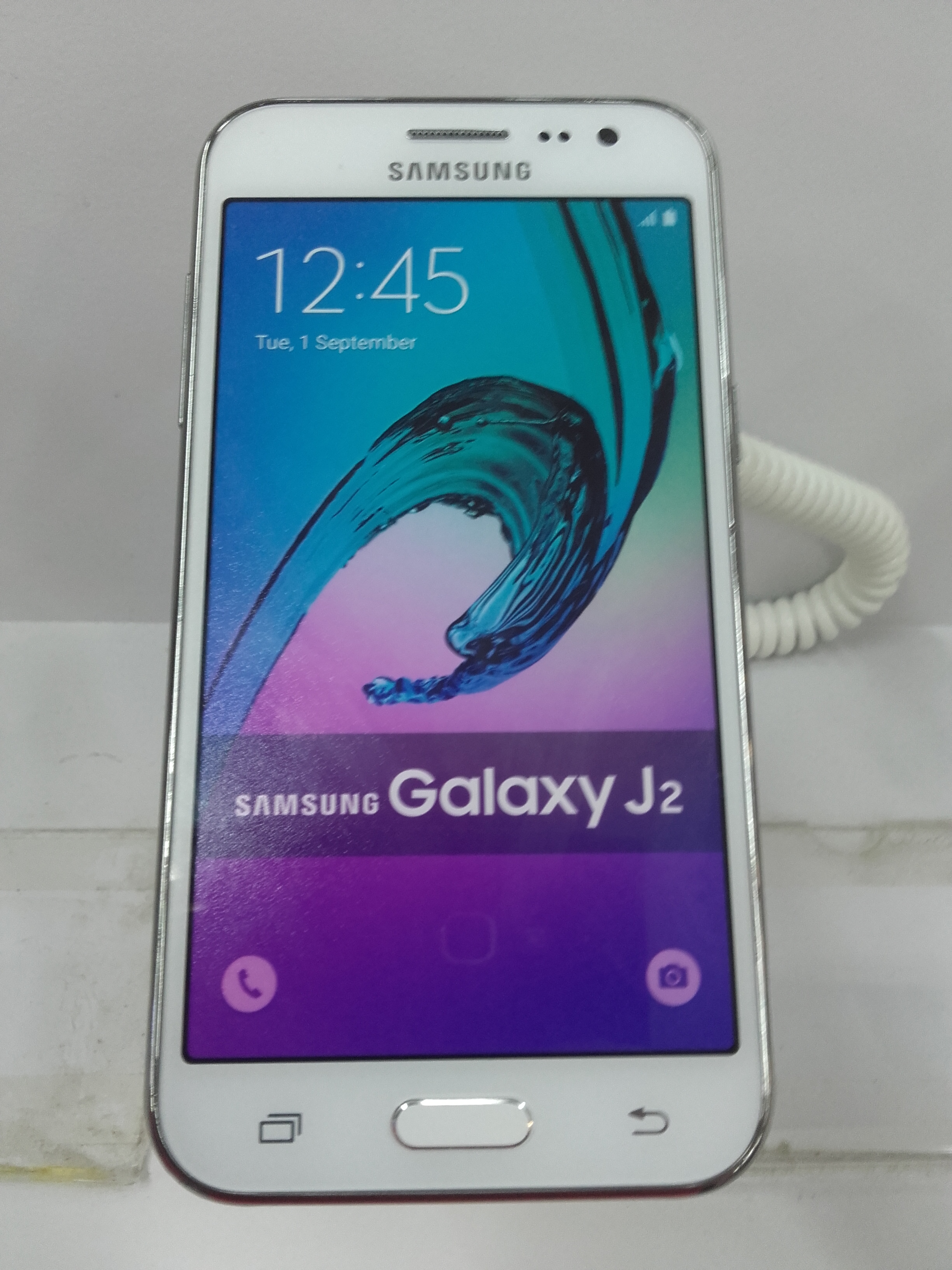
- A dummy unit of the Galaxy J2 in White
- Brand: Samsung
- Manufacturer: Samsung Electronics
- Type: Smartphone
- Series: Galaxy J
- First released: September 11, 2015; 11 years ago
- Discontinued: 2017
- Predecessor: Samsung Galaxy Core Prime
- Successor: Samsung Galaxy J2 (2016)
- Related: Samsung Galaxy J1; Samsung Galaxy J5; Samsung Galaxy J7
- Compatible networks: 2G GSM 850, 900, 1800, 1900, 2100; 3G HSDPA 850, 900, 1900, 2100; 4G LTE Bands 1, 3, 5, 7, 8, 20, 28, 40
- Form factor: Slate
- Dimensions: 136.5 mm (5.37 in) H 69 mm (2.7 in) W 8.4 mm (0.33 in) D
- Weight: 129 g (4.6 oz)
- Operating system: Android 5.1.1 "Lollipop"; TouchWiz
- System-on-chip: Exynos 3475
- CPU: Quad-core 1.3 GHz ARM Cortex-A7
- GPU: Mali-T720
- Memory: 1 GB
- Storage: 8 GB
- Removable storage: microSD up to 128 GB
- SIM: Single SIM or Dual SIM (Micro-SIM)
- Battery: 2000 mAh, removable
- Rear camera: 5 MP, f/2.2
- Front camera: 2 MP, f/2.2
- Display: 4.7", 540×960 px (234 ppi) Super AMOLED
- Sound: Mono speaker
- Connectivity: WLAN 802.11 b/g/n, Bluetooth 4.1, GPS/GLONASS, NFC (some models only), FM radio, microUSB 2.0, 3.5 mm headphone jack
- Data inputs: Accelerometer, proximity sensor
- Model: SM-J200x (x varies by region and carrier)
- Website: Galaxy J2

The Samsung Galaxy J2 is an Android smartphone manufactured by Samsung Electronics. It was announced and released in September 2015.

== Specifications ==
=== Hardware ===
The Galaxy J2 is powered by an Exynos 3475 SoC including a quad-core 1.3 GHz ARM Cortex-A7 CPU, an ARM Mali-T720 GPU and 1 GB RAM. The 8 GB internal storage can be upgraded up to 128 GB via a microSD card.

It features a 4.7-inch Super AMOLED display. The rear camera has 5 megapixels with LED flash, f/2.2 aperture and autofocus; the front camera has 2 megapixels with f/2.2 aperture.

=== Software ===
The Galaxy J2 is shipped with Android 5.1.1 "Lollipop" and Samsung's TouchWiz user interface.

== Re-release ==
In October 2017, Samsung re-released the Galaxy J2 as the Samsung Galaxy J2 2017 Edition (also known as the Samsung Galaxy J2 (2017)), featuring a different back panel texture and frame color. It was available only in black and gold colors.

== See also ==
- Samsung Galaxy
- Samsung Galaxy J series

Preceded by Samsung Galaxy J1	Samsung Galaxy J2; 2015	Succeeded by Samsung Galaxy J2 (2016)
