= Samsung Galaxy J3 Pro =

Samsung smartphone

- Manufacturer: Samsung Electronics
- Type: Smartphone
- Series: Galaxy J series
- First released: June 6, 2016; 10 years ago
- Discontinued: 2018
- Successor: Galaxy J3 (2017)
- Related: Galaxy J3 (2016)
- Compatible networks: 2G GSM 850, 900, 1800, 1900; 3G HSDPA 850, 900, 1900, 2100; 4G LTE Bands 1, 3, 4, 7, 41
- Form factor: Slate
- Dimensions: 142.2 mm (5.60 in) H 71.3 mm (2.81 in) W 8 mm (0.31 in) D
- Weight: 139 g (4.9 oz)
- Operating system: Android 5.1.1 "Lollipop"; TouchWiz
- System-on-chip: Qualcomm Snapdragon 410
- CPU: Quad-core (4×1.2 GHz) ARM Cortex-A53
- GPU: Adreno 306
- Memory: 2 GB
- Storage: 16 GB
- Removable storage: microSD up to 256 GB
- Battery: 2600 mAh (removable)
- Rear camera: 8 MP, f/2.2
- Front camera: 5 MP, f/.2.2
- Display: 5.0", 720×1280 px (294 ppi) Super AMOLED
- Connectivity: WLAN 802.11b/g/n, Bluetooth 4.1, GPS/GLONASS, NFC, microUSB 2.0, 3.5 mm headphone jack
- Data inputs: Accelerometer, proximity sensor
- Model: SM-J311x (x varies by carrier and region)
- Other: FM radio, Dual SIM
- Website: Galaxy J3 Pro

The Samsung Galaxy J3 Pro is an Android smartphone manufactured by Samsung Electronics. The phone is made for the Chinese market and branded by China Telecom.

== Specifications ==
=== Hardware ===
The Galaxy J3 Pro is powered by a Snapdragon 410 SoC including a quad-core 1.2 GHz ARM Cortex-A53 CPU, an Adreno 306 GPU with 2 GB RAM. The 16 GB of internal storage can be upgraded up to 256 GB via microSD card.

It features a 5.0-inch Super AMOLED display with a HD Ready resolution. The 8 MP rear camera has f/2.2 aperture. The front camera has 5 MP, also with f/2.2 aperture.

=== Software ===
The J3 Pro shipped with Android 5.1.1 "Lollipop" and Samsung's TouchWiz user interface.

== See also ==
- Samsung Galaxy
- Samsung Galaxy J series
