= Samsung Galaxy J series =

Discontinued line of Android smartphones

Samsung Galaxy J
- Developer: Samsung Electronics
- Product family: Samsung Galaxy
- Type: Smartphones, tablets
- Released: 1 February 2015
- Discontinued: 4 April 2019; 7 years ago
- Operating system: Android
- System on a chip: Exynos; Snapdragon; Spreadtrum; Marvell; MediaTek; Broadcom
- Successor: Samsung Galaxy M series (2020–); Samsung Galaxy A series

The Samsung Galaxy J series is a discontinued line of entry-level 32-bit Android smartphones produced by the South Korean company Samsung Electronics, a part of the Samsung Galaxy series first introduced in 2015 and focused on emerging markets, merging the Galaxy Core, Grand, E, Trend, Ace and Young lines under one family, preceding the current Galaxy M series and placed below the mid-range Galaxy A series.

== History ==
Being mainly aimed at low-end market segments, all models in the series have the essential features of a standard entry-level smartphone, and differ in size and design. The letter J stands for "Joy" or "Junior". However, new features such as slow motion and video recording at any resolution above 1080p and any frame rates above 30 frames per second are left out entirely.

Other materials are used, with Samsung targeting Asian markets or the European entry-level market. The models are updated at least annually, minor updates or variants are displayed with name additions such as Pro, Prime, Max, etc.

Despite having a similar name, the original Galaxy J (SGH-N075/SC-02F), released in 2013, does not actually belong to the Galaxy J series as this phone was only available in few markets, and also positioned as a high-end smartphone based on the Samsung Galaxy S4.

In September 2018, there were rumors that Samsung will reorganize their smartphone lineup by discontinuing the Galaxy J series in favor of extending the mid-range Galaxy A series to the entry-level segment and replacing the online-exclusive Galaxy On series of smartphones with the Galaxy M series to better compete against the increasingly popular Chinese manufacturers, such as Huawei, Oppo, Vivo, and Xiaomi in the budget smartphone market. Samsung later introduced M10 and M20 in January 2019, followed by Galaxy A10, A30, and A50 the following month, and announced two months later that the Galaxy J series has officially merged into the Galaxy A series during the 2019 Galaxy A series launch event in April 2019 held in Thailand.

== Models ==
=== Galaxy J1 ===
| Model | Model number | Release date | Display type | Display size | Display resolution | SoC | GPU | RAM | Internal Storage | Camera | | Battery | Operating system | |
| Model | Model number | Release date | Display type | Display size | Display resolution | SoC | GPU | RAM | Internal Storage | Main | Front | Battery | Initial | Latest |
|---|---|---|---|---|---|---|---|---|---|---|---|---|---|---|
| Galaxy J1 | SM-J100F; SM-J100FN; SM-J100H; SM-J100H/DD; SM-J100M; SM-J100ML; SM-J100MU; SM-J100VPP; SM-J100Y | February 2015 | TFT | 4.3" | 480x800px (≈217 ppi) | Spreadtrum SC7727S 2x 1.2 GHz Cortex-A7 | Mali-400 MP1 | 512 MB | 4 GB | 5 MP, f/2.2 | 2 MP | 1850 mAh (Li-Ion) | Android 4.4.4 | |
| Galaxy J1 4G | SM-J100VZBPVZW | March 2015 | TFT | 4.3" | 480x800px (≈217 ppi) | Spreadtrum SC7727S 2x 1.2 GHz Cortex-A7 | Mali-400 MP1 | 768 MB | 4 GB | 5 MP | 2 MP | 1850 mAh (Li-Ion) | Android 5.0.2 | Android 5.1.1 |
| Galaxy J1 Ace | SM-J110F; SM-J110G; SM-J110H; SM-J110L; SM-J110M | October 2015 | Super AMOLED | 4.3" | 480x800px (≈217 ppi) | Spreadtrum SC9830; 4x 1.2 GHz Cortex-A7 Marvell PXA1908; 2x 1.3 GHz Cortex-A53 (J110L) | Mali-400 MP2 Vivante GC7000 UL (J110L) | 512 MB (J110L); 768 MB; 1 GB | 4 GB; 8 GB | 5 MP, f/2.2 | 2 MP | 1900 mAh (Li-Ion) | Android 4.4.4 | Android 5.1.1 |
| Galaxy J1 Ace Neo | SM-J111F; SM-J111M | October 2015 | Super AMOLED | 4.3" | 480x800px (≈217 ppi) | Spreadtrum SC9830 4x 1.5 GHz Cortex-A7 | Mali-400 MP2 | 512 MB (J110L); 768 MB; 1 GB | 4 GB; 8 GB | 5 MP, f/2.2 | 2 MP | 1900 mAh (Li-Ion) | Android 4.4.4 | Android 5.1.1 |
| Galaxy J1 (2016) Galaxy Express 3 Galaxy Amp 2 | SM-J120A; SM-J120AZ; SM-J120F; SM-J120FN; SM-J120G; SM-J120H; SM-J120M; SM-J120T; SM-J120W; SM-J120ZN | January 2016 | Super AMOLED | 4.5" | 480x800px (≈207 ppi) | Spreadtrum SC9830 4x 1.3 GHz Cortex-A7 | Mali-400 MP2 | 1 GB | 8 GB | 5 MP, f/2.2 | 2 MP, f/2.2 | 2050 mAh (Li-Ion) | Android 5.1.1 | Android 5.1.1 |
| Galaxy J1 Nxt | SM-J105B; SM-J105F; SM-J105H; SM-J105M; SM-J105Y | February 2016 | TFT | 4" | 480x800px (≈233 ppi) | Spreadtrum SC9830 4x 1.2 GHz Cortex-A7 | Mali-400 MP2 | 1 GB | 8 GB | 5 MP | n/a | 1500 mAh (Li-Ion) | Android 5.1.1 | Android 5.1.1 |
| Galaxy J1 mini | SM-J105B; SM-J105F; SM-J105H; SM-J105M; SM-J105Y | February 2016 | TFT | 4" | 480x800px (≈233 ppi) | Spreadtrum SC9830 4x 1.2 GHz Cortex-A7 | Mali-400 MP2 | 768 MB | 8 GB | 5 MP | n/a | 1500 mAh (Li-Ion) | Android 5.1.1 | Android 5.1.1 |
| Galaxy J1 mini prime Indonesia: Galaxy V2 | SM-J106B; SM-J106F; SM-J106H; SM-J106M | December 2016 | TFT | 4" | 480x800px (≈233 ppi) | Spreadtrum SC9830 4x 1.2 GHz Cortex-A7; 4x 1.5 GHz Cortex-A7 (SM-J106F) | Mali-400 MP2 | 1 GB | 8 GB eMMC 5.1 | 5 MP, f/2.2 | n/a | 1500 mAh (Li-Ion) | Android 6.0 | |

=== Galaxy J2 ===
| Model | Model number | Release date | Display type | Display size | Display resolution | SoC | GPU | RAM | Internal Storage | Camera | | Battery | Operating System | |
| Model | Model number | Release date | Display type | Display size | Display resolution | SoC | GPU | RAM | Internal Storage | Main | Front | Battery | Initial | Latest |
|---|---|---|---|---|---|---|---|---|---|---|---|---|---|---|
| Galaxy J2 Galaxy J2 Duos | SM-J200F; SM-J200G; SM-J200GU; SM-J200H; SM-J200M; SM-J200Y; SM-J200BT | September 2015 | Super AMOLED | 4.37" | 540x960px (≈234 ppi) | Samsung Exynos 3 Quad 3475 4x 1.3 GHz Cortex-A7 | Mali-T720 @600 MHz | 1 GB LPDDR3 | 8 GB eMMC 4.5 | 5 MP, f/2.2 | 2 MP, f/2.2 | 2000 mAh (Li-Ion) | Android 4.4.4 | Android 5.1.1 |
| Galaxy J2 (2016) | SM-J210F; SM-J210G; SM-J210GU; SM-J210H | July 2016 | Super AMOLED | 5" | 720x1280px (≈294 ppi) | Spreadtrum SC8830 4x 1.5 GHz Cortex-A7 | Mali-400 MP2 | 1.5 GB | 8 GB | 8 MP, f/2.2 | 5 MP, f/2.2 | 2600 mAh (Li-Ion) | Android 5.1.1 | Android 6.0.1 |
| Galaxy J2 Pro (2016) | SM-J210F; SM-J210G; SM-J210GU; SM-J210H | July 2016 | Super AMOLED | 5" | 720x1280px (≈294 ppi) | Spreadtrum SC8830 4x 1.5 GHz Cortex-A7 | Mali-400 MP2 | 2 GB | 16 GB | 8 MP, f/2.2 | 5 MP, f/2.2 | 2600 mAh (Li-Ion) | Android 6.0.1 | |
| Galaxy J2 Prime | SM-G532F; SM-G532G; SM-G532M; SM-G532MT | November 2016 | PLS LCD | 5" | 540x960px (≈220 ppi) | MediaTek MT6737T 4x 1.5 GHz Cortex-A53 | Mali-T720 MP2 @600 MHz | 1.5 GB | 8 GB; 16 GB eMMC 5.0 | 8 MP, f/2.2 | 5 MP, f/2.2 | 2600 mAh (Li-Ion) | Android 6.0.1 | |
| Galaxy J2 Pro (2018); Galaxy Grand Prime Pro | SM-J250F; SM-J250G; SM-J250M; SM-J250Y | January 2018 | Super AMOLED | 5" | 540x960px (≈220 ppi) | Qualcomm Snapdragon 425 4x 1.4 GHz Cortex-A53 | Adreno 308 @500 MHz | 1.5 GB; 2 GB LPDDR3 | 16 GB; 32 GB eMMC 5.1 | 8 MP, f/2.2 | 5 MP, f/2.2 | 2600 mAh (Li-Ion) | Android 7.1.1 | |
| Galaxy J2 Core | SM-J260A; SM-S260DL; SM-J260F; SM-J260G; SM-J260M; SM-J260T1; SM-J260Y | August 2018 | PLS LCD | 5" | 540x960px (≈220 ppi) | Samsung Exynos 7 Quad 7570 4x 1.4 GHz Cortex-A53 | Mali-T720 MP1 @830 MHz | 1 GB LPDDR3 | 8 GB; 16 GB eMMC 5.0 | 8 MP, f/2.2 | 5 MP, f/2.2 | 2600 mAh (Li-Ion) | Android 8.1 (Go) | Android 9.0 (SM-J260A) |
| Galaxy J2 Pure | SM-J260AZ | February 2019 | PLS LCD | 5" | 540x960px (≈220 ppi) | Samsung Exynos 7 Quad 7570 4x 1.4 GHz Cortex-A53 | Mali-T720 MP1 @830 MHz | 2 GB LPDDR3 | 16 GB | 8 MP, f/2.2 | 5 MP, f/2.2 | 2600 mAh (Li-Ion) | Android 8.1 (Go) | Android 9.0 |
| Galaxy J2 Core (2020) | SM-J260FU; SM-J260GU; SM-J260GU/DS; SM-J260MU | April 2020 | PLS LCD | 5" | 540x960px (≈220 ppi) | Samsung Exynos 7 Quad 7570 4x 1.4 GHz Cortex-A53 | Mali-T720 MP1 @830 MHz | 1 GB LPDDR3 | 16 GB | 8 MP, f/2.2 | 5 MP, f/2.2 | 2600 mAh (Li-Ion) | Android 8.1 (Go) | |

=== Galaxy J3 ===
| Model | Model number | Release date | Display type | Display size | Display resolution | SoC | GPU | RAM | Internal Storage | Camera | | Battery | Operating system | |
| Model | Model number | Release date | Display type | Display size | Display resolution | SoC | GPU | RAM | Internal Storage | Main | Front | Battery | Initial | Latest |
|---|---|---|---|---|---|---|---|---|---|---|---|---|---|---|
| Galaxy J3 (2016) India: Galaxy J3 Pro; Galaxy J3 V (Verizon); Galaxy Amp Prime | SM-J320A; SM-J320F; SM-J320FN; SM-J320G; SM-J320H; SM-J320M; SM-J320N0; SM-J320P; SM-J320V; SM-J320W8; SM-J320Y; SM-J320YZ; SM-J320ZN; SM-J3109 | May 2016 | Super AMOLED With Asahi Dragontrail Glass | 5" | 720x1280px (≈294 ppi) | Spreadtrum SC9830; 4x 1.5 GHz Cortex-A7 Samsung Exynos 3 Quad 3475; 4x 1.3 GHz Cortex-A7 (USA) | Mali-400 MP2 Mali-T720 @600 MHz (USA) | 1.5 GB; 2 GB | 8 GB; 16 GB | 8 MP, f/2.2 5 MP, f/2.2 (USA) | 5 MP, f/2.2 2 MP (USA) | 2600 mAh (Li-Ion) | Android 5.1.1 Android 6.0 (USA) | Android 6.0 Android 7.1.1 (USA) |
| Galaxy J3 Pro (China) | SM-J327; SM-J3119; SM-J3119S; SM-J3110 | June 2016 | Super AMOLED | 5" | 720x1280px (≈294 ppi) | Qualcomm Snapdragon 410 4x 1.2 GHz Cortex-A53 | Adreno 306 @450 MHz | 2 GB | 16 GB eMMC 4.5 | 8 MP, f/2.2 | 5 MP, f/2.2 | 2600 mAh (Li-Ion) | Android 5.1.1 | |
| Galaxy J3 Prime Galaxy J3 Emerge; Galaxy J3 Eclipse; Galaxy Express Prime 2 Galaxy Amp Prime 2 | SM-J327; SM-J327A; SM-J326AZ; SM-J327P; SM-J327T; SM-J327V; SM-J327W | January 2017 | TFT | 5" | 720x1280px (≈294 ppi) | Qualcomm Snapdragon 425; 4x 1.4 GHz Cortex-A53 Qualcomm Snapdragon 430; 8x 1.4 GHz Cortex-A53 (J327P) Samsung Exynos 7 Quad 7570; 4x 1.4 GHz Cortex-A53 (J327A) | Adreno 308 @500 MHz Adreno 505 @450 MHz (J327P) Mali-T720 MP1 @830 MHz (J327A) | 1.5 GB | 16 GB eMMC 5.1 | 5 MP, f/1.9 | 2 MP, f/2.2 | 2600 mAh (Li-Ion) | Android 6.0 (TouchWiz) | Android 8.1 (Samsung Experience) |
| Galaxy J3 (2017) Galaxy J3 Pro (2017); Galaxy J3 (2017) Duos | SM-J327F; SM-J327U; SM-J330F; SM-J330FN; SM-J330G; SM-J330L; SM-J330N; SM-J3300; SM-J3308; SM-S337TL; J330F; J330G | July 2017 | PLS LCD | 5" | 720x1280px (≈294 ppi) | Samsung Exynos 7 Quad 7570 4x 1.4 GHz Cortex-A53 | Mali-T720 MP1 @830 MHz | 2 GB LPDDR3 | 16 GB eMMC 5.0 | 13 MP, f/1.9 | 5 MP, f/2.2 | 2400 mAh (Li-Ion) | Android 7.0 (Samsung Experience) | Android 9.0 (One UI) |
| Galaxy J3 (2018) Galaxy J3 Star; Galaxy Amp Prime 3 Galaxy J3 V 2018; Galaxy J3 Aura Galaxy J3 Orbit | SM-J337A; SM-J337AZ; SM-J337P; SM-J337R; SM-J337T; SM-J337U SM-J337V; SM-J337VPP; SM-J337W SM-S367VL | June 2018 | PLS LCD | 5" | 720x1280px (≈294 ppi) | Samsung Exynos 7 Quad 7570 4x 1.4 GHz Cortex-A53 | Mali-T720 MP1 @830 MHz | 2 GB LPDDR3 | 16 GB eMMC 5.0 | 8 MP, f/1.9 | 5 MP, f/2.2 | 2600 mAh (Li-Ion) | Android 8.0 (Samsung Experience) | Android 9.0 (One UI) (except SM-J337AZ and SM-J337T) |

=== Galaxy J4 ===
| Model | Model number | Release date | Display type | Display size | Display resolution | SoC | GPU | RAM | Internal Storage | Camera | | Battery | Operating system | |
| Model | Model number | Release date | Display type | Display size | Display resolution | SoC | GPU | RAM | Internal Storage | Main | Front | Battery | Initial | Latest |
|---|---|---|---|---|---|---|---|---|---|---|---|---|---|---|
| Galaxy J4 | SM-J400F; SM-J400G; SM-J400M | May 2018 | Super AMOLED | 5.5" | 720x1280px (≈267 ppi) | Samsung Exynos 7 Quad 7570 4x 1.4 GHz Cortex-A53 | Mali-T720 MP1 @830 MHz | 2 GB; 3 GB LPDDR3 | 16 GB; 32 GB eMMC 5.0 | 13 MP, f/1.9 | 5 MP, f/2.2 | 3000 mAh (Li-Ion) | Android 8.0 (Samsung Experience) | Android 10 (One UI) |
| Galaxy J4+ | SM-J415F; SM-J415FN; SM-J415G; SM-J415GN; SM-J415N | October 2018 | IPS LCD | 6" | 720x1480px (≈274 ppi) | Qualcomm Snapdragon 425 4x 1.4 GHz Cortex-A53 | Adreno 308 @500 MHz | 2 GB; 3 GB LPDDR3 | 16 GB; 32 GB eMMC 5.1 | 13 MP, f/1.9 | 5 MP, f/2.2 | 3300 mAh (Li-Ion) | Android 8.1 (Samsung Experience) | Android 9.0 (One UI) |
| Galaxy J4 Core | SM-J410D; SM-J410F; SM-J410G | November 2018 | IPS LCD | 6" | 720x1480px (≈274 ppi) | Qualcomm Snapdragon 425 4x 1.4 GHz Cortex-A53 | Adreno 308 @500 MHz | 1 GB LPDDR3 | 16 GB eMMC 5.1 | 8 MP, f/2.2 | 5 MP, f/2.2 | 3300 mAh (Li-Ion) | Android 8.1 (Go) | Android 8.1 (Go) |

=== Galaxy J5 ===
| Model | Model number | Release date | Display type | Display size | Display resolution | SoC | GPU | RAM | Internal Storage | Camera | | Battery | Operating system | |
| Model | Model number | Release date | Display type | Display size | Display resolution | SoC | GPU | RAM | Internal Storage | Main | Front | Battery | Initial | Latest |
|---|---|---|---|---|---|---|---|---|---|---|---|---|---|---|
| Galaxy J5 (2015) | SM-J500F; SM-J500FN; SM-J500G; SM-J500H; SM-J500M; SM-J500N0; SM-J500Y; SM-J5007; SM-J5008; J5; J500S | July 2015 | Super AMOLED | 5" | 720x1280px (≈294 ppi) | Qualcomm Snapdragon 410 4x 1.2 GHz Cortex-A53 | Adreno 306 @450 MHz | 1.5 GB | 8 GB; 16 GB eMMC 4.5 | 13 MP, f/1.9 | 5 MP, f/2.2 | 2600 mAh (Li-Ion) | Android 5.1.1 | Android 6.0.1 |
| Galaxy J5 (2016) Galaxy J5 Metal | SM-J510F; SM-J510FN; SM-J510FQ; SM-J510G; SM-J510GN; SM-J510H; SM-J510K; SM-J510L; SM-J510M; SM-J510MN; SM-J510S; SM-J510UN; SM-J510Y; SM-J5108 | April 2016 | Super AMOLED | 5.2" | 720x1280px (≈282 ppi) | Qualcomm Snapdragon 410 4x 1.2 GHz Cortex-A53 | Adreno 306 @450 MHz | 2 GB | 16 GB eMMC 4.5 | 13 MP, f/1.9 | 5 MP, f/2.2 | 3100 mAh (Li-Ion) | Android 6.0.1 (TouchWiz) | Android 7.1.1(Samsung Experience) |
| Galaxy J5 Prime | SM-G570F; SM-G570F/DD; SM-G570M; SM-G570Y | October 2016 | IPS LCD | 5" | 720x1280px (≈294 ppi) | Samsung Exynos 7 Quad 7570 4x 1.4 GHz Cortex-A53 | Mali-T720 MP1 @830 MHz | 2 GB LPDDR3 | 16 GB; 32 GB eMMC 5.0 | 13 MP, f/1.9 | 5 MP, f/2.2 | 2400 mAh (Li-Ion) | Android 6.0.1 (TouchWiz) | Android 8.0 (Samsung Experience) |
| Galaxy J5 (2017) Galaxy J5 Pro (2017); Galaxy J5 (2017) Duos | SM-J530F; SM-J530FM; SM-J530G; SM-J530GM; SM-J530K; SM-J530L; SM-J530S; SM-J530Y; SM-J530YM | June 2017 | Super AMOLED | 5.2" | 720x1280px (≈282 ppi) | Samsung Exynos 7 Octa 7870 8x 1.6 GHz Cortex-A53 | Mali-T830 MP1 @700 MHz | 2 GB; 3 GB LPDDR3 | 16 GB; 32 GB eMMC 5.1 | 13 MP, f/1.7 | 13 MP, f/1.9 | 3000 mAh (Li-Ion) | Android 7.0 (Samsung Experience) | Android 9.0 (One UI) |

=== Galaxy J6 ===
| Model | Model number | Release date | Display type | Display size | Display resolution | SoC | GPU | RAM | Internal Storage | Camera | | Battery | Operating system | |
| Model | Model number | Release date | Display type | Display size | Display resolution | SoC | GPU | RAM | Internal Storage | Main | Front | Battery | Initial | Latest |
|---|---|---|---|---|---|---|---|---|---|---|---|---|---|---|
| Galaxy J6 India: Galaxy On6 | SM-J600F; SM-J600FN; SM-J600G; SM-J600GF; SM-J600GT; SM-J600L | October 2018 | Super AMOLED | 5.6" | 720x1480px (≈293 ppi) | Samsung Exynos 7 Octa 7870 8x 1.6 GHz Cortex-A53 | Mali-T830 MP1 @700 MHz | 2 GB; 3 GB; 4 GB LPDDR3 | 32 GB; 64 GB eMMC 5.1 | 13 MP, f/1.9 | 8 MP, f/1.9 | 3000 mAh (Li-Ion) | Android 8.0 (Samsung Experience) | Android 10 (One UI) |
| Galaxy J6+ | SM-J610F; SM-J610FN; SM-J610G | October 2018 | IPS LCD | 6" | 720x1480px (≈274 ppi) | Qualcomm Snapdragon 425 4x 1.4 GHz Cortex-A53 | Adreno 308 @500 MHz | 3 GB; 4 GB LPDDR3 | 32 GB; 64 GB eMMC 5.1 | 13 MP, f/1.9 + 5 MP, f/1.9, (Depth) | 8 MP, f/1.9 | 3300 mAh (Li-Ion) | Android 8.1 (Samsung Experience) | Android 10 (One UI) |

=== Galaxy J7 ===
| Model | Model number | Release date | Display type | Display size | Display resolution | SoC | GPU | RAM | Internal Storage | Camera | | Battery | Operating system | |
| Model | Model number | Release date | Display type | Display size | Display resolution | SoC | GPU | RAM | Internal Storage | Main | Front | Battery | Initial | Latest |
|---|---|---|---|---|---|---|---|---|---|---|---|---|---|---|
| Galaxy J7 Galaxy J7 Duos | SM-J700F; SM-J700H; SM-J700K; SM-J700M; SM-J700P; SM-J700T; SM-J700T1; SM-J7008 | July 2015 | Super AMOLED | 5.5" | 720x1280px (≈267 ppi) | Qualcomm Snapdragon 615; 4x 1.5 GHz + 4x 1.0 GHz Cortex-A53 Samsung Exynos 7 Octa 7580; 8x 1.6 GHz Cortex-A53 (SM-J700F, SM-J700H)Qualcomm Snapdragon 410; 4x 1.2 GHz Cortex-A53 (SM-J700K) Qualcomm Snapdragon 415; 8x 1.4 GHz Cortex-A53 (SM-J700P) | Adreno 405 @550 MHz Mali-T720 MP2 @668 MHz (SM-J700F, SM-J700H) Adreno 306 @450 MHz (SM-J700K) Adreno 405 @550 MHz (SM-J700P) | 1.5 GB LPDDR3 | 16 GB | 13 MP, f/1.9 | 5 MP, f/2.2 | 3000 mAh (Li-Ion) | Android 5.1.1 | Android 5.1.1 (SM-J700K) Android 6.0.1 (SM-J700F, SM-J700H, SM-J700M) Android 7.1.1 (SM-J700P, SM-J700T, SM-J700T1) |
| Galaxy J7 (2016) Galaxy J7 Metal | SM-J710F; SM-J710FN; SM-J710FQ; SM-J710GN; SM-J710H; SM-J710K; SM-J710M; SM-J710MN; SM-J7108; SM-J7109 | April 2016 | Super AMOLED | 5.5" | 720x1280px (≈267 ppi) | Samsung Exynos 7 Octa 7870; 8x 1.6 GHz Cortex-A53 Qualcomm Snapdragon 617; 4x 1.5 GHz + 4x 1.2 GHz Cortex-A53 (China) | Mali-T830 MP1 @700 MHz Adreno 405 @550 MHz (China) | 2 GB; 3 GB (China) LPDDR3 | 16 GB eMMC 5.1 | 13 MP, f/1.9 | 5 MP, f/1.9 | 3300 mAh (Li-Ion) | Android 6.0.1 (TouchWiz) | Android 8.1 (Samsung Experience) |
| Galaxy J7 Prime Galaxy On Nxt; Galaxy On7 (2016) | SM-G610F; SM-G610M; SM-G610Y; SM-G6100; SM-G610S; SM-G610K; SM-G610L | November 2016 | IPS LCD | 5.5" | 1080x1920px (≈401 ppi) | Samsung Exynos 7 Octa 7870 8x 1.6 GHz Cortex-A53 Qualcomm Snapdragon 625; 8x 2.0 GHz Cortex-A53 (China) | Mali-T830 MP1 @700 MHz Adreno 506 @650 MHz (China) | 3 GB LPDDR3 | 16 GB; 32 GB; 64 GB eMMC 5.1 | 13 MP, f/1.9 | 8 MP, f/1.9 | 3300 mAh (Li-Ion) | Android 6.0.1 (TouchWiz) | Android 8.1 (Samsung Experience) |
| Galaxy J7 V Galaxy J7 Sky Pro; Galaxy Wide2 (South Korea) | SM-J727A; SM-J727AZ; SM-J727F; SM-J727P; SM-J727R4; SM-J727S; SM-J727T; SM-J727U; SM-J727V; SM-J727VPP; SM-S727VL | March 2017 | IPS LCD | 5.5" | 720x1280px (≈267 ppi) | Qualcomm Snapdragon 625 8x 2.0 GHz Cortex-A53 | Adreno 506 @650 MHz | 2 GB LPDDR3 | 16 GB eMMC 5.1 | 8 MP | 5 MP | 3300 mAh (Li-Ion) | Android 7.0 (Samsung Experience) | Android 8.1 (Samsung Experience) |
| Galaxy J7 Max Galaxy On Max | SM-G615F; SM-G615FU | June 2017 | PLS LCD | 5.7" | 1080x1920px (≈386 ppi) | MediaTek Helio P20 4x 2.3 GHz Cortex-A53 + 4x 1.6 GHz Cortex-A53 | Mali-T880 MP2 @900 MHz | 4 GB LPDDR4X | 32 GB | 13 MP, f/1.7 | 13 MP, f/1.9 | 3300 mAh (Li-Ion) | Android 7.0 (Samsung Experience) | Android 8.1 (Samsung Experience) |
| Galaxy J7 Nxt Galaxy J7 Nxt Duos; Galaxy J7 Neo; Galaxy J7 Core | SM-J701F; SM-J701M; SM-J701MT | July 2017 | Super AMOLED | 5.5" | 720x1280px (≈267 ppi) | Samsung Exynos 7 Octa 7870 8x 1.6 GHz Cortex-A53 | Mali-T830 MP1 @700 MHz | 2 GB; 3 GB LPDDR3 | 16 GB; 32 GB | 13 MP, f/1.9 | 5 MP, f/2.2 | 3000 mAh (Li-Ion) | Android 7.0 (Samsung Experience) | Android 9.0 (One UI) |
| Galaxy J7 (2017) Galaxy J7 Pro | SM-J730F; SM-J730FM; SM-J730K | July 2017 | Super AMOLED | 5.5" | 1080x1920px (≈401 ppi) | Samsung Exynos 7 Octa 7870 8x 1.6 GHz Cortex-A53 | Mali-T830 MP1 @700 MHz | 2 GB; 3 GB LPDDR3 | 16 GB eMMC 5.1 | 13 MP, f/1.7 | 13 MP, f/1.9 | 3600 mAh (Li-Ion) | Android 7.0 (Samsung Experience) | Android 9.0 (One UI) |
| Galaxy J7 Pro | SM-J730G; SM-J730GM | July 2017 | Super AMOLED | 5.5" | 1080x1920px (≈401 ppi) | Samsung Exynos 7 Octa 7870 8x 1.6 GHz Cortex-A53 | Mali-T830 MP1 @700 MHz | 3 GB LPDDR3 | 16 GB; 32 GB; 64 GB eMMC 5.1 | 13 MP, f/1.7 | 13 MP, f/1.9 | 3600 mAh (Li-Ion) | Android 7.0 (Samsung Experience) | Android 9.0 (One UI) |
| Galaxy J7+ | SM-C710F; SM-C7100; SM-C7108 | October 2017 | Super AMOLED | 5.5" | 1080x1920px (≈401 ppi) | MediaTek Helio P20 4x 2.3 GHz Cortex-A53+ 4x 1.6 GHz Cortex-A53 | Mali-T880 MP2 @900 MHz | 3 GB; 4 GB LPDDR4X | 32 GB; 64 GB | 13 MP, f/1.7 + 5 MP, f/1.9, (Depth) | 16 MP, f/1.9 | 3000 mAh (Li-Ion) | Android 7.1.1 (Samsung Experience) | Android 8.1 |
| Galaxy J7 Prime 2 Galaxy On7 Prime (2018) | SM-G611F; SM-G611FF; SM-G611K; SM-G611M; SM-G611MT | April 2018 | PLS LCD | 5.5" | 1080x1920px (≈401 ppi) | Samsung Exynos 7 Octa 7870 8x 1.6 GHz Cortex-A53 | Mali-T830 MP1 @700 MHz | 3 GB LPDDR3 | 32 GB eMMC 5.1 | 13 MP, f/1.9 | 13 MP, f/1.9 | 3300 mAh (Li-Ion) | Android 7.1.1 (Samsung Experience) | Android 9.0 (One UI) |
| Galaxy J7 Duo | SM-J720F; SM-J720F/DS; SM-J720M; SM-J720M/DS | April 2018 | Super AMOLED | 5.5" | 720x1280px (≈267 ppi) | Samsung Exynos 7885 2x 2.2 GHz Cortex-A73 + 6x 1.6 GHz Cortex-A53 | Mali-G71 MP2 @1.1 GHz | 3 GB; 4 GB LPDDR4 | 32 GB eMMC 5.1 | 13 MP, f/1.9 + 5 MP, f/1.9, (Depth) | 8 MP, f/1.9 | 3000 mAh (Li-Ion) | Android 8.0 (Samsung Experience) | Android 10 (One UI) |
| Galaxy J7 (2018); Galaxy Wide3 (South Korea) | SM-J737A; SM-J737F; SM-J737P; SM-J737S; SM-J737T; SM-J737T1; SM-J737U; SM-J737V SM-J737VPP SM-S767VL SM-S757BL | July 2018 | TFT With Gorilla Glass 5 | 5.5" | 720x1280px (≈267 ppi) | Samsung Exynos 7 Octa 7870 8x 1.6 GHz Cortex-A53 | Mali-T830 MP1 @700 MHz | 2 GB LPDDR3 | 16 GB; 32 GB eMMC 5.1 | 8 MP / 13 MP, f/1.7 | 5 MP / 13 MP, f/1.7 | 3300 mAh (Li-Ion) | Android 8.0 (Samsung Experience) | Android 9.0 (One UI) |

=== Galaxy J8 ===
| Model | Model number | Release date | Display type | Display size | Display resolution | SoC | GPU | RAM | Internal Storage | Camera | | Battery | Operating system | |
| Model | Model number | Release date | Display type | Display size | Display resolution | SoC | GPU | RAM | Internal Storage | Main | Front | Battery | Initial | Latest |
|---|---|---|---|---|---|---|---|---|---|---|---|---|---|---|
| Galaxy J8 India: Galaxy On8 | SM-J810F; SM-J810G; SM-J810GF; SM-J810M; SM-J810Y; J810Y | July 2018 | Super AMOLED | 6" | 720x1480px (≈274 ppi) | Qualcomm Snapdragon 450 8x 1.8 GHz Cortex-A53 | Adreno 506 @600 MHz | 3 GB; 4 GB LPDDR3 | 32 GB; 64 GB eMMC 5.1 | 16 MP, f/1.7 + 5 MP, f/1.9, (Depth) | 16 MP, f/1.9 | 3500 mAh (Li-Ion) | Android 8.0 (Samsung Experience) | Android 10 (One UI) |

== Successor ==
The Galaxy J series was discontinued in April 2019 in favor of extending the mid-range Galaxy A series into the entry-level segment, as well as introducing the online-exclusive Galaxy M series. The 2019 lineup also introduced Samsung's new naming scheme, with two-digit numbers as opposed to single digit of previous generation models.

== See also ==
- Samsung Galaxy
- Samsung Galaxy Note series
- Samsung Galaxy S series
- Samsung Galaxy A series
- Samsung Galaxy M series
- Samsung Galaxy Tab series
- Samsung Gear
