= Samsung Galaxy J5 (2017) =

Android-based smartphone by Samsung Electronics

Samsung Galaxy J5 (2017)/Pro
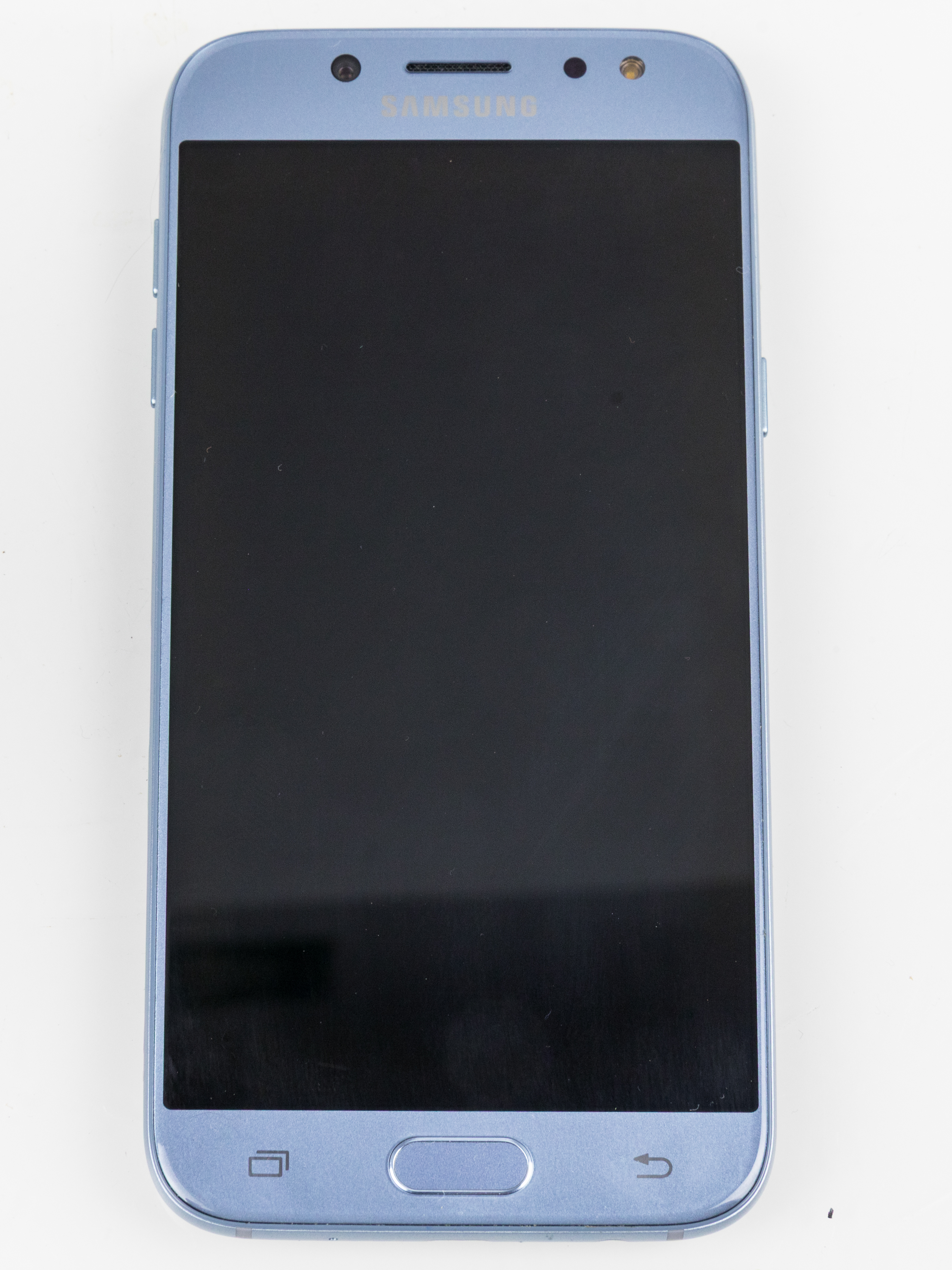
- Samsung Galaxy J5 (2017)
- Also known as: Samsung Galaxy J5 (2017) Duos (Dual-SIM model)
- Manufacturer: Samsung Electronics
- Type: Smartphone
- Series: Galaxy J
- First released: June 2017
- Discontinued: 2018
- Predecessor: Samsung Galaxy J5 (2016); Samsung Galaxy J5 Prime
- Successor: Samsung Galaxy J6
- Related: Samsung Galaxy J3 (2017); Samsung Galaxy J7 (2017)
- Compatible networks: (GSM/HSPA/LTE); 2G: GSM 850 / 900 / 1800 / 1900 - SIM 1 & SIM 2 (dual-SIM model only); 3G UMTS: HSDPA 850 / 900 / 1900 / 2100; 4G FDD LTE: LTE band 1(2100), 3(1800), 5(850), 7(2600), 8(900), 20(800)
- Form factor: Slate
- Dimensions: 146.2 mm (5.76 in) H; 71.3 mm (2.81 in) W; 8 mm (0.31 in) D
- Weight: 160 g (5.64 oz)
- Operating system: Android 7.0 Nougat with Samsung Experience, upgradable to Android 9 Pie with One UI 1.1
- System-on-chip: Samsung Exynos 7870 Octa
- CPU: Octa-core 1.6GHz Cortex A53
- GPU: Mali-T830 MP1 700MHz
- Memory: J5 (2017): 2 GB; J5 Pro: 3 GB; LPDDR3 933MHz
- Storage: J5 (2017): 16 or 32 GB; J5 Pro: 32 GB eMMC 5.1
- Removable storage: microSD up to 256 GB
- SIM: no eSIM support, dual SIM in the J530F/DS model
- Battery: Non Removable Li-Ion 3000 mAh battery
- Charging: Standard charging up to 7.75W (No wireless charging)
- Rear camera: 13 MP, 4128 × 3096 pixels, autofocus, LED flash Video: 1080p @ 30 Hz
- Front camera: 13 megapixels, LED flash Video: 1080p @ 30 Hz
- Display: 5.2 in (130 mm) 720 × 1280 pixels (282 ppi) Super AMOLED
- Sound: 3.5mm headphones jack
- Connectivity: List: Wi-Fi :802.11 a/b/g/n/ac (2.4/5 GHz); Wi-Fi Direct; Wi-Fi hotspot; DLNA; GPS/GLONASS/BEIDOU; NFC; Bluetooth 4.2; USB 2.0 (Micro-B port, USB charging) USB OTG; 3.50 mm (0.138 in) headphone jack
- Model: SM-J530x (last letter varies with carrier and international models)
- Codename: j5y17lte
- Other: WiFi hotspot, VoLTE and VoWiFi support

Samsung Galaxy J5 (2017) is an Android-based smartphone produced, released and marketed by Samsung Electronics. It was unveiled and released in July 2017 along with the Samsung Galaxy J3 (2017). It has an advanced 64-bit class system on a chip (SoC) backed by 2 GB of LPDDR3 RAM (933MHz). The Galaxy J5 (2017) is the successor to the Samsung Galaxy J5 (2016). Another version of the Galaxy J5 (2017), the Samsung Galaxy J5 Pro was released for the Malaysian market with 3 GB of RAM and 32 GB of internal storage, while the other specifications are the same.

The Galaxy J5 (2017) was available at the major carriers following the Galaxy J3.

== Specifications ==
=== Hardware ===
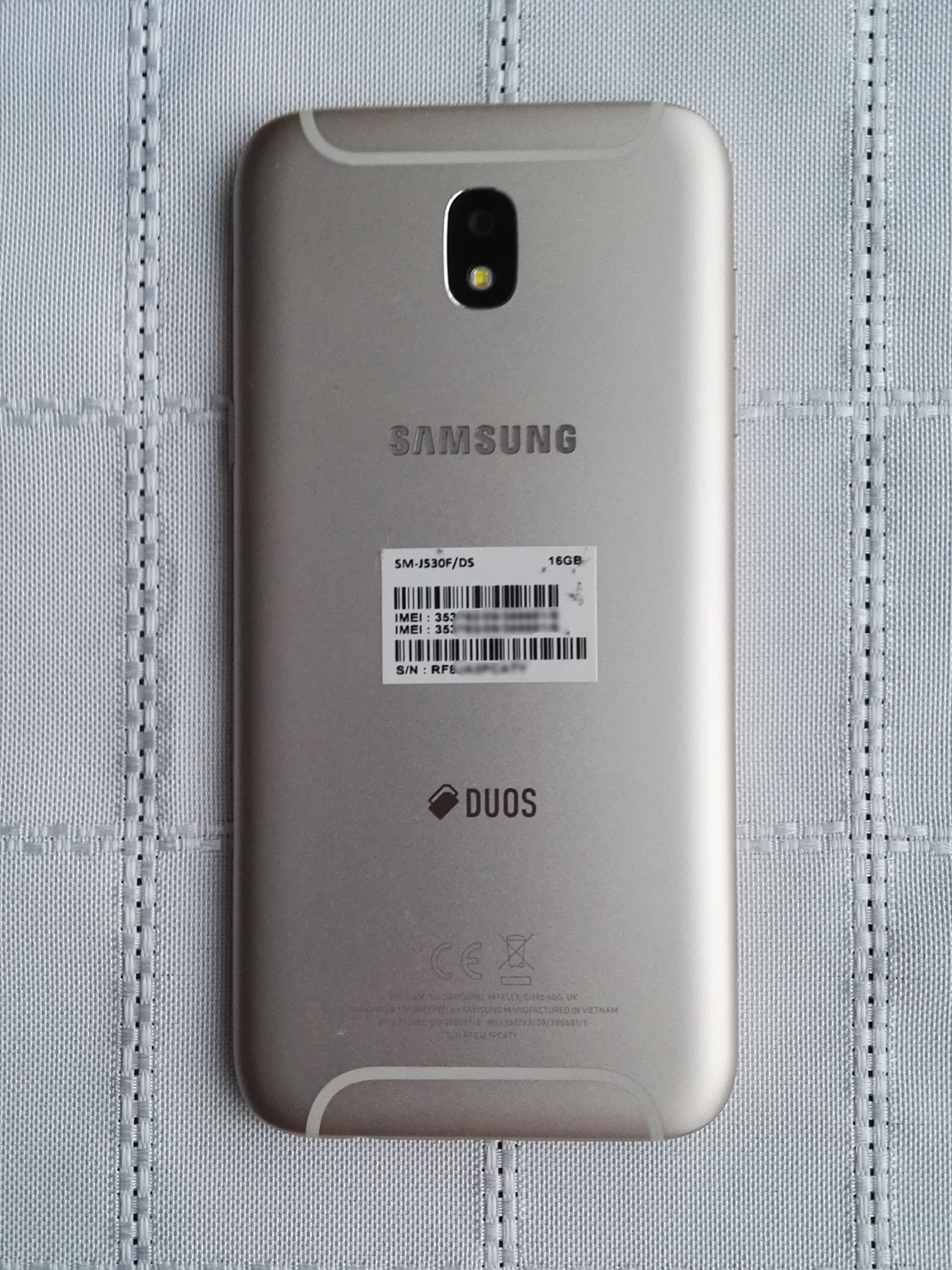
The back of the Galaxy J5 (2017) in Gold

The phone is powered by Exynos 7870 Octa, a 1.6 GHz octa-core processor, Mali-T830 MP1 GPU running at 700MHz and 2 GB RAM with 16 GB of internal storage (3 GB and 32 GB respectively in the Galaxy J5 Pro). There is the option to expand the storage capacity by up to 256 GB with a microSD card.

The Galaxy J5 (2017) packs a non-removable 3000 mAh battery.

The introduction of the fingerprint sensor and Samsung Pay (selected models) was also a first in the lower mid-range J series of smartphones by Samsung. The Galaxy J5 also sports dual-band 802.11 a/b/g/n/ac Wi-Fi network capability, which allows it to connect to both 2.4 GHz and 5 GHz networks for fast internet access. Also, a first in the J5 (non-Prime) series is the metal construction, which gives a premium feel to the phone.

The Galaxy J5 (2017) features a 13 MP rear camera with LED flash, f/1.7 aperture, auto-focus and a 13 MP front-facing camera with f/1.9 aperture, also equipped with LED flash.

The Samsung Galaxy J5 (2017) has a 720×1280 (16:9 ratio, 282 PPI Density) SUPER AMOLED Display. with a 5.2-inch (71.5% screen-to-body ratio) screen.

=== Software ===
This phone comes with Android 7.0. It supports 4G VoLTE with dual SIM enabled 4G. It also supports Samsung Knox. It is expected along with other phones including the Samsung Galaxy S8, Note 8, A7 (2017), J7 (2017), J3 (2017), S7, S6 and Note 5 to get Android 8.0 Oreo in 2018. As of 2018 August, Android 8.1 Oreo is available in Poland (for the SM-J530F). Android 9 Pie with One UI 1.1 is available as of 2019 September.

== See also ==
- Samsung Galaxy J series
- Samsung Galaxy
- Samsung
- Android (operating system)

Preceded by Samsung Galaxy J5 (2016)	Samsung Galaxy J5 (2017); 2017	Succeeded by Samsung Galaxy A6
