= 3J =

3J may refer to:

- Jerry Jamal Jameson, a Family Matters character
- 3-j symbol, in quantum mechanics
- Zip (airline), a defunct Canadian airline, IATA code 3J
- Jubba Airways, a Somali airline, IATA code 3J

== See also ==
- JJJ (disambiguation)
- J3 (disambiguation)
- J-coupling, in nuclear chemistry and nuclear physics
