= Samsung Galaxy J2 Pure =

2019 entry-level smartphone by Samsung Electronics

- Brand: Samsung
- Manufacturer: Samsung Electronics
- Type: Smartphone
- Series: Galaxy J
- Family: Samsung Galaxy
- First released: February 2019; 7 years ago
- Compatible networks: 2G / 3G / 4G
- Form factor: Slate
- Weight: 153 g (5 oz)
- Operating system: Android 8.1 "Oreo" (Go edition)
- System-on-chip: Exynos 7570
- CPU: Quad-core ARM Cortex-A53 1.4 GHz
- GPU: Mali-T720
- Memory: 2 GB RAM
- Storage: 16 GB internal
- Removable storage: microSD up to 400 GB
- SIM: Nano-SIM
- Battery: 2600 mAh removable
- Rear camera: 8 MP
- Front camera: 5 MP
- Connectivity: Wi-Fi 802.11 b/g/n, Bluetooth 4.2, GPS/GLONASS

The Samsung Galaxy J2 Pure is an Android-based smartphone manufactured and designed by Samsung Electronics as part of the Galaxy J series. It was debuted in August 2018 along with the J2 Dash and was released in 2019 as an entry-level device for budget-conscious consumers.

== Specifications ==
Similar to the J2 Prime, the frame is made of polycarbonate as well as the buttons.

The Galaxy J2 Pure runs Android 8.1 Oreo (Go edition) and is powered by the Exynos 7570 processor paired with 2 GB of RAM and 16 GB of internal storage, expandable via microSD card up to 400 GB. It also as access to Cricket Wireless connectivity.

The device features a 5.0-inch PLS TFT LCD display with a resolution of 540 × 960 pixels. It includes an 8-megapixel rear camera and a 5-megapixel front-facing camera.

The smartphone uses a quad-core ARM Cortex-A53 CPU clocked at 1.4 GHz with a Mali-T720 GPU. It is powered by a removable 2600 mAh battery and supports LTE connectivity, Bluetooth 4.2, GPS/GLONASS, and microUSB 2.0.
