= Samsung Galaxy J5 (2016) =

Android-based smartphone released by Samsung Electronics in 2016

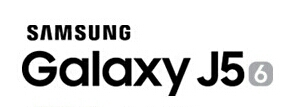

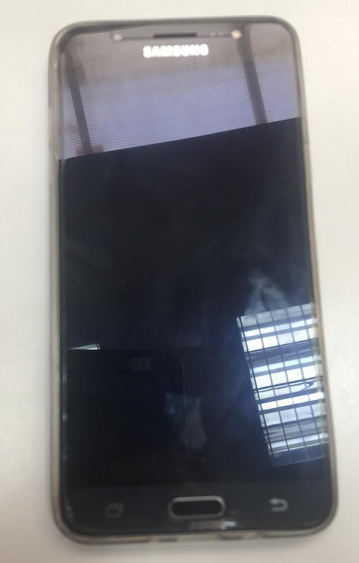
- Manufacturer: Samsung
- Type: Smartphone
- Series: Galaxy J
- First released: April 2016; 10 years ago
- Discontinued: 2018
- Predecessor: Samsung Galaxy J5
- Successor: Samsung Galaxy J5 (2017)
- Related: Samsung Galaxy J1 (2016); Samsung Galaxy J2 (2016); Samsung Galaxy J3 (2016); Samsung Galaxy J7 (2016)
- Compatible networks: (GSM/HSPA/LTE); 2G: GSM GSM850, GSM900, DCS1800, PCS1900; 3G UMTS: B1(2100), B2(1900), B5(850), B8(900); 4G FDD LTE: B1(2100), B3(1800), B5(850), B7(2600), B8(900), B20(800); 4G TDD LTE: B40(2300)
- Form factor: Slate
- Dimensions: 145.1 mm (5.74 in) H 72.3 mm (2.85 in) W 8.1 mm (0.32 in) D
- Weight: 158 g (5.61 oz)
- Operating system: Hong Kong & China (SM-J5108) or Taiwan (SM-J510UN) Android 5.1.1 Lollipop Upgradable to Android 6.0.1 Marshmallow Other models Android 6.0.1 Marshmallow Upgradeable to Android 7.1.1 Nougat with Samsung Experience version 8.5
- CPU: Quad-Core 1.2GHz Cortex-A53
- GPU: Adreno 306
- Memory: LPDDR3 2 GB RAM
- Storage: 16 GB
- Removable storage: microSD up to 128 GB
- Battery: 3100 mAh Li-ion
- Rear camera: 13 MP, 4128 x 3096 pixels, autofocus, LED flash
- Front camera: 5 megapixels (1080p) HD video recording @ 30 fps back-illuminated sensor
- Display: 5.2 in (130 mm) 1280 x 720 pixels (294 ppi) Super AMOLED
- Connectivity: List: Wi-Fi: 802.11 a/b/g/n (2.4 GHz); Wi-Fi Direct; Wi-Fi hotspot; DLNA; GPS/GLONASS; NFC; Bluetooth 4.1; USB 2.0 (Micro-B port, USB charging) USB OTG; 3.50 mm (0.138 in) headphone jack
- Model: SM-J510F (EMEA); SM-J510FN/DS (Europe, Asia, South Africa); SM-J5108 (China, Hong Kong); SM-J510MN (LATAM); SM-J510GN (Philippines); SM-J510S (SK Telecom); SM-J510K (KT Corporation); SM-J510L (LG Uplus); SM-J510UN (Taiwan)
- Other: Price : €230; $245
- Website: Official International Website (Samsung UK)

Samsung Galaxy J5 2016 is an Android-based smartphone produced, developed, released and marketed by Samsung Electronics. It was unveiled and released in April 2016. It has 2 GB LPDDR3 RAM.

The Galaxy J5 has a 13 Megapixel rear camera with LED flash, f/1.9 aperture, auto-focus and a 5,2 Megapixel front facing camera f/1.9, also equipped with LED flash.

== Specifications ==
=== Hardware ===
The phone is powered by 64-bit Qualcomm Snapdragon 410 chipset, a 1.2 GHz processor, Adreno 306 GPU and 2 GB RAM with 16 GB of internal storage and a 3100 mAh battery. The Samsung Galaxy J5 (2016) is fitted with a 5.2-inch HD Super AMOLED display.

=== Software ===
This phone comes with Android 6.0.1, upgradeable to Android 7.1.1 (32-bit). It supports 4G LTE with dual SIM enabled 4G. It also supports Samsung Knox.

== See also ==
- Samsung Galaxy J series
- Samsung Galaxy
- Samsung
- Android (operating system)

Preceded by Samsung Galaxy J5	Samsung Galaxy J5 (2016); 2016	Succeeded by Samsung Galaxy J5 (2017)
