= JJJ =

JJJ may refer to:

- Triple J, Australian radio station
- JJJ, the production code for the 1971 Doctor Who serial The Dæmons
- J. Jonah Jameson, a fictional character created by Stan Lee and Steve Ditko
  - J. Jonah Jameson (2002 film series character), the Sam Raimi Spider-Man trilogy and Marvel Cinematic Universe versions
- Jaren Jackson Jr. (born 1999), American basketball player
- Jesse Jackson, Jr. (born 1965), American politician

== See also ==
- 3J (disambiguation)
- Jing-Jin-Ji, a metropolitan region of China
