= Samsung Galaxy J1 mini prime =

Android Smartphone

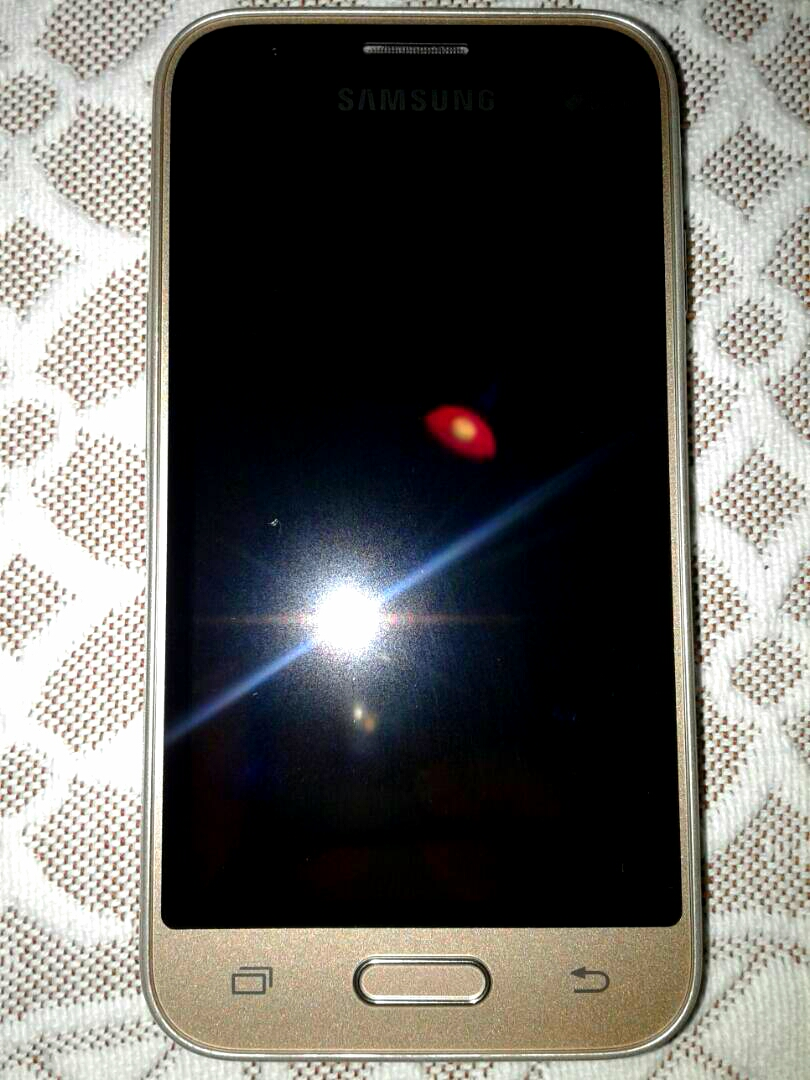
- Samsung Galaxy J1 mini prime in Beige
- Manufacturer: Samsung Electronics
- Type: Smartphone
- Series: Galaxy J series
- First released: December 2016
- Discontinued: 2018
- Predecessor: Galaxy J1 Nxt/mini
- Successor: Galaxy J1 (2017)
- Related: Samsung Galaxy J1 (2016)
- Compatible networks: 2G GSM 850, 900, 1800, 1900; 3G HSDPA 850, 900, 1900, 2100; 4G LTE Bands 1, 3, 5, 7, 8, 40
- Form factor: Slate
- Dimensions: 126.6 mm (4.98 in) H 63.1 mm (2.48 in) W 10.8 mm (0.43 in) D
- Weight: 123 g (4.3 oz)
- Operating system: Android 5.1.1 "Lollipop"; TouchWiz; Android 6.0.1 "Marshmallow"; TouchWiz (LTE models only)
- System-on-chip: Spreadtrum SC9830
- CPU: Quad-core (4×1.2 GHz) ARM Cortex-A7 (3G) quad-core (4×1.5 GHz) ARM Cortex-A7 (LTE)
- GPU: ARM Mali-400MP2
- Memory: 1 GB
- Storage: 8 GB
- Removable storage: microSD up to 256GB
- Battery: 1500 mAh (removable)
- Rear camera: 5 MP f/2.2
- Front camera: 0.3 MP
- Display: 4.0", 480×800 px (233 ppi) TFT LCD
- Connectivity: WLAN 802.11 b/g/n, Bluetooth 4.0, GPS/GLONASS, microUSB 2.0
- Model: SM-J106x (x varies by carrier and region)
- Other: FM radio, Dual SIM (Duos model only)

The Samsung Galaxy J1 mini prime (known as the Galaxy V2 in Indonesia) is an Android powered smartphone developed by Samsung Electronics and was released in December 2016. It is the successor of the J1 Nxt/mini.

== Specifications ==
=== Hardware ===
The Samsung J1 mini prime is powered by a Spreadtrum SC9830 SoC including a quad-core ARM Cortex-A7 CPU with either 1.2 GHz (3G) or 1.5 GHz (LTE), an ARM Mali-400MP2 GPU and 1GB of RAM. The 8GB of internal storage can be expanded for up to 128 GB via microSD card. It also features a 5 MP rear camera with LED flashlight and a video resolution of 480p at 30fps.

=== Software ===
The J1 mini prime is originally shipped with Android 5.1.1 "Lollipop" and Samsung's TouchWiz user interface. LTE-models are shipped with Android 6.0.1 "Marshmallow".

== See also ==
- Samsung Galaxy
- Samsung Galaxy J series
