= Samsung Galaxy J5 =

Android smartphone produced by Samsung

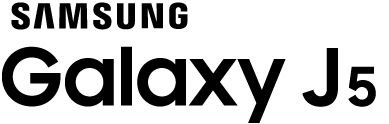

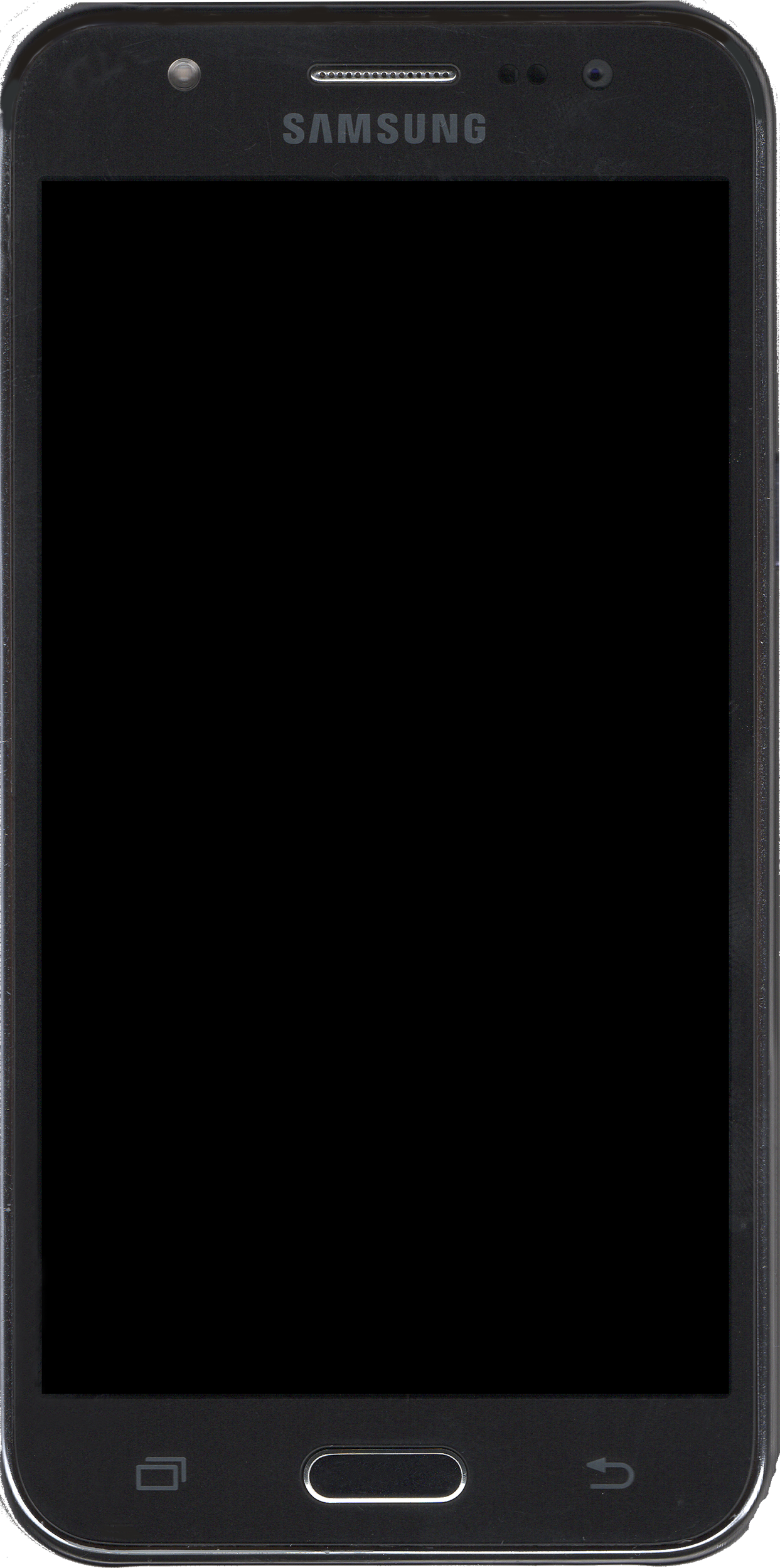
- Samsung Galaxy J5 in Black
- Manufacturer: Samsung Electronics
- Type: Touchscreen smartphone
- Series: Galaxy J
- First released: 26 June 2015 (USA, India, Latin America, China, Brazil, Europe)
- Discontinued: 2018
- Successor: Samsung Galaxy J5 (2016)
- Related: Samsung Galaxy E5; Samsung Galaxy J1; Samsung Galaxy J2; Samsung Galaxy J7
- Compatible networks: (GSM/HSPA/LTE); 2G: GSM GSM850, GSM900, DCS1800, PCS1900; 3G UMTS: B1(2100), B2(1900), B5(850), B8(900); 4G FDD LTE: B1(2100), B3(1800), B5(850), B8(900), B20(800); 4G TDD LTE: B40(2300)
- Form factor: Slate
- Dimensions: 142.8 mm (5.59 in) H; 71.8 mm (2.83 in) W; 7.9 mm (0.31 in) D
- Weight: 146 g (5.15 oz)
- Operating system: Original: Android 5.1.1 Lollipop; Current: 6.0.1 Marshmallow
- CPU: Quad-core 1.2 GHz Cortex-A53
- GPU: Adreno 306
- Memory: 1.5GB LPDDR3 RAM
- Storage: 8GB or 16GB
- Removable storage: microSD up to 128 GB
- Battery: 2600 mAh Li-ion
- Rear camera: 13 MP, 4128 × 3096 pixels, autofocus, LED flash
- Front camera: 5 megapixels (1080p) HD video recording @ 30 Hz back-illuminated sensor with LED flash
- Display: 5 in (130 mm) 720 × 1280 pixels (294 ppi) Super AMOLED
- Connectivity: List: Wi-Fi :802.11 a/b/g/n/ac (2.4/5 GHz); Wi-Fi Direct; Wi-Fi hotspot; DLNA; GPS/GLONASS/BeiDou; NFC; Bluetooth 4.1; BT-LE; USB 2.0 (Micro-B port, USB charging) USB OTG; 3.50 mm (0.138 in) headphone jack
- Model: SM-J500F (India, UAE, Turkey); SM-J500M (Latin America); SM-J500FN (Europe); SM-J500H (3G-only model); SM-J5008 (China); SM-J500N0 (Korea); SM-J500G; SM-J5007 (Taiwan); SM-J500Y (Oceania)
- Website: Official Website

The Samsung Galaxy J5 is an Android smartphone produced by Samsung Electronics. It was unveiled and released in June 2015. It has Qualcomm Snapdragon 410 SoC that is backed by 1.5 GB RAM and that has a 64 bit processor, 32bit mode OS.

It has a 13 megapixel rear camera with an LED flash, f/1.9 aperture, auto-focus and a 5 megapixel wide-angle front facing camera which can extend up to 120°, also equipped with an LED flash.

== Specifications ==
=== Hardware ===
The phone is powered by Qualcomm's Snapdragon 410 chipset that has a 1.2 GHz processor, Adreno 306 GPU and that is backed by 1.5 GB RAM with 8 GB or 16GB of internal storage and a 2600 mAh battery. J500G model comes with a 2100 mAh battery. Samsung Galaxy J5 is fitted with a 5-inch HD Super AMOLED display. The South Korean variant adds support for T-DMB & Smart DMB. The phone has a plastic chassis and plastic back cover.

According to the BLE Checker app, the phone supports Bluetooth Low Energy devices.

=== Software ===
This phone comes with Android 5.1.1 Lollipop and is upgradable to Android 6.0.1 Marshmallow. It supports 4G LTE with dual SIM enabled 4G and Voice over LTE. It also supports Samsung Knox. In 2016, it received an update to support Samsung S-Bike Mode

Model	Date	Regions
SM-J500F	13 June 2015	Asia, Africa, and Europe
SM-J500M	26 June 2015	Latin America
SM-J500H	12 July 2015	Asia, Africa, and parts of Latin America
SM-J500Y	21 September 2015	Oceania
SM-J500FN	26 September 2015	Europe

For the device, there is an unofficial Android 7.1.1 Nougat firmware based on the official Samsung firmware for SM-A530F.

== See also ==
- Samsung Galaxy J
- Samsung Galaxy
- Samsung
- Android (operating system)
- Samsung Galaxy J series

Preceded by	Samsung Galaxy J5; 2015	Succeeded by Samsung Galaxy J5 (2016)
