= Samsung Galaxy J3 (2017) =

Android smartphone by Samsung

- Manufacturer: Samsung Electronics
- Type: Smartphone
- Series: Galaxy J series
- First released: June 2017; 9 years ago
- Discontinued: 2019
- Predecessor: Samsung Galaxy J3 (2016)
- Successor: Samsung Galaxy J4
- Related: Samsung Galaxy J5 (2017); Samsung Galaxy J7 (2017)
- Compatible networks: 2G GSM 850, 900, 1800, 1900; 3G HSDPA 850, 900, 1900, 2100; 4G LTE Bands 1, 3, 5, 7, 8, 20
- Form factor: Slate
- Dimensions: 143.2 mm (5.64 in) H 70.3 mm (2.77 in) W 8.2 mm (0.32 in) D
- Weight: 142 g (5.0 oz)
- Operating system: Original: Android 7.0 "Nougat" with Samsung Experience 8.1; Current: Android 9.0 "Pie" with One UI 1.1
- System-on-chip: Exynos 7570
- CPU: Quad-core (4×1.4 GHz) ARM Cortex-A53
- GPU: ARM Mali-T720MP2
- Memory: 2 GB; 1.5 GB (AT&T)
- Storage: 16 GB
- Removable storage: microSD up to 256 GB
- Battery: 2400 mAh
- Rear camera: 13 MP, f/1.9
- Front camera: 5 MP, f/.2.2
- Display: 5.0", 720×1280 px (294 ppi) TFT LCD
- Connectivity: WLAN 802.11b/g/n, Bluetooth 4.1, GPS/GLONASS, microUSB 2.0, 3.5 mm headphone jack
- Data inputs: Accelerometer, proximity sensor, fingerprint sensor
- Model: SM-J330x (x varies by carrier and region)
- Other: FM radio, Dual SIM (Duos only)
- Website: Galaxy J3 (2017)

The Samsung Galaxy J3 (2017) (also known as Galaxy J3 Pro) is an Android smartphone manufactured by Samsung Electronics and was released in June 2017.

== Specifications ==
=== Hardware ===
The Galaxy J3 (2017) is powered by an Exynos 7570 SoC including a quad-core 1.4 GHz ARM Cortex-A53 CPU, an ARM Mali-T720MP2 GPU with 1.5 (AT&T) or 2 GB RAM and 16 GB of internal storage which can be upgraded up to 256 GB via microSD card.

It has a 5.0-inch TFT LCD with an HD Ready resolution. The 13 MP rear camera features f/1.9 aperture, autofocus, LED flash, HDR and Full HD video. The front camera has 5 MP, also with f/2.2 aperture.

=== Software ===
The J3 (2017) is originally shipped with Android 7.0 "Nougat" and Samsung's Experience user interface. An update to 8.0 "Oreo" became available in August 2018 for Russia, and September 2018 for other countries. As of August 2019 the latest version 9.0 "Pie" including One UI became available.

== See also ==
- Samsung Galaxy
- Samsung Galaxy J series
