= Samsung Galaxy J1 Nxt =

2016 Android smartphone from Samsung

Samsung Galaxy J1 Nxt/mini
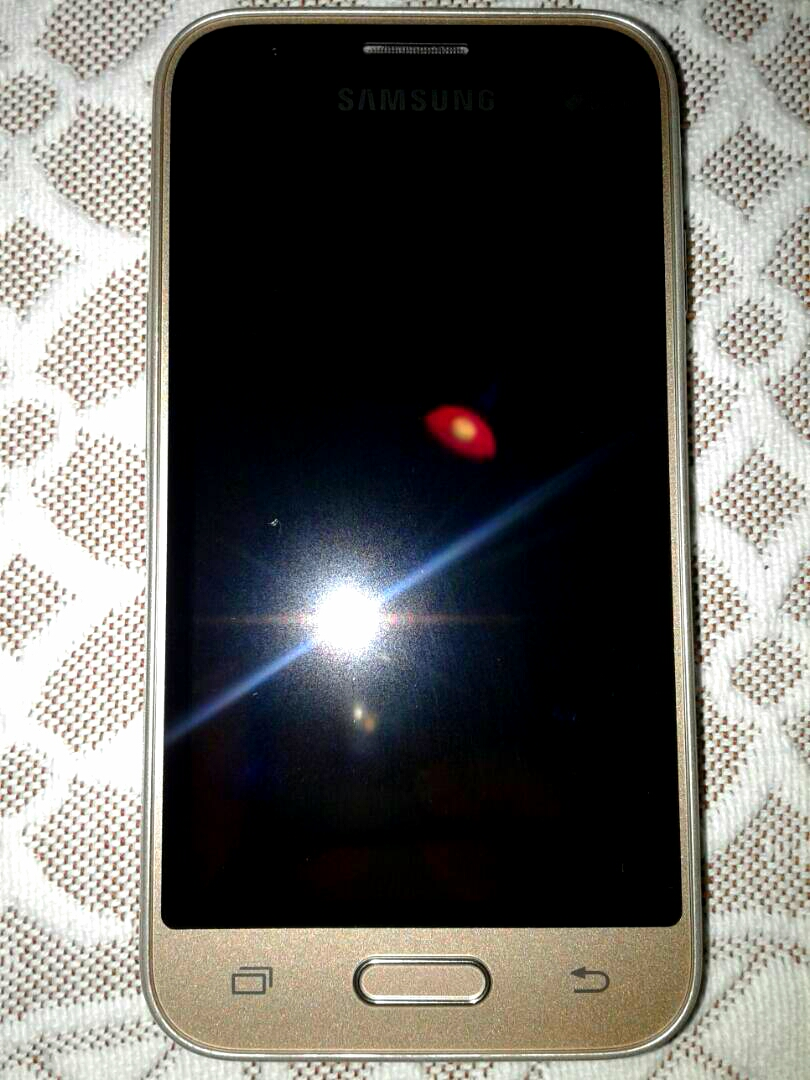
- Samsung Galaxy J1 Nxt
- Brand: Samsung
- Manufacturer: Samsung Electronics
- Type: Smartphone
- Series: Galaxy J series
- First released: February 2016
- Discontinued: 2018
- Successor: Samsung Galaxy J1 mini prime
- Related: Samsung Galaxy J1 (2016)
- Compatible networks: 2G GSM 850, 900, 1800, 1900; 3G HSDPA 900, 2100
- Form factor: Slate
- Dimensions: 126.6 mm (4.98 in) H 63.1 mm (2.48 in) W 10.8 mm (0.43 in) D
- Weight: 123 g (4.3 oz)
- Operating system: Android 5.1.1 "Lollipop"; TouchWiz
- System-on-chip: Spreadtrum SC8830A
- CPU: Quad-core (4×1.2 GHz) ARM Cortex-A7
- GPU: ARM Mali-400MP2
- Memory: 768 MB (J1 mini); 1 GB (J1 Nxt)
- Storage: 8 GB
- Removable storage: microSD up to 128 GB
- Battery: 1500 mAh (Removable)
- Rear camera: 5 MP
- Front camera: 5 MP
- Display: 4.0", 480×800 px, TFT LCD
- Connectivity: WLAN 802.11 b/g/n, Bluetooth 4.0, GPS/GLONASS, microUSB 2.0
- Data inputs: Accelerometer
- Model: SM-J105x (x varies by carrier and region)
- Other: FM radio, Dual SIM

The Samsung Galaxy J1 Nxt (also called J1 mini) is an Android powered smartphone developed by Samsung Electronics and was released in February 2016.

== Specifications ==
=== Hardware ===
The J1 Nxt has a Spreadtrum SC9830 SoC consisting of a quad-core 1.2 GHz ARM Cortex-A7 CPU and a Mali-400MP2 GPU. It has either 768 MB (J1 mini) or 1GB (J1 Nxt) of RAM and 8 GB of internal storage. A microSD card can be inserted for up to an additional 128GB. The rear camera's resolution is 5 MP and has an LED flashlight. The video resolution is 720p at 30fps.

=== Software ===
The J1 Nxt is shipped with Android 5.1.1 "Lollipop" and Samsung's TouchWiz user interface.

== See also ==
- Samsung Galaxy
- Samsung Galaxy J series
