= Samsung Galaxy J3 (2016) =

Smartphone

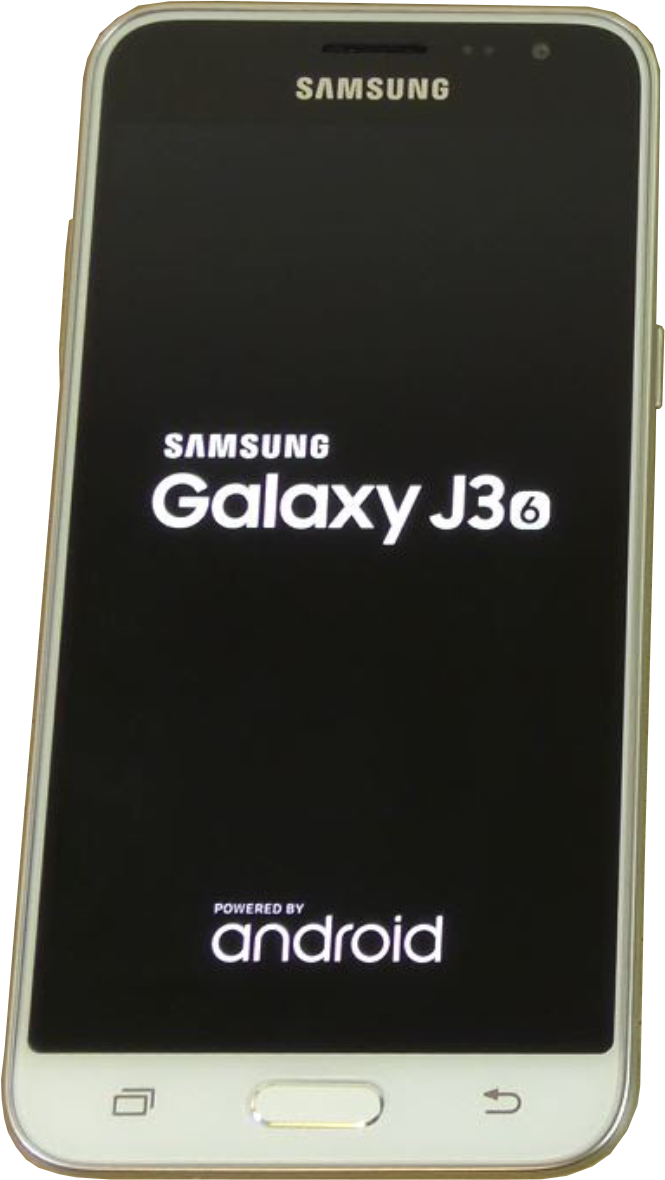
- Samsung Galaxy J3 (2016) in White
- Developer: Samsung
- Manufacturer: Samsung Electronics
- Type: Smartphone
- Series: Galaxy J series
- First released: 6 May 2016; 10 years ago
- Discontinued: 2017
- Successor: Samsung Galaxy J3 (2017); Samsung Galaxy J3 Prime
- Related: Samsung Galaxy J1 (2016); Samsung Galaxy J2 (2016); Samsung Galaxy J5 (2016); Samsung Galaxy J7 (2016); Galaxy J3 Pro; Galaxy Grand Prime
- Compatible networks: 2G GSM 850, 900, 1800, 1900; 3G HSDPA 850, 900, 1900, 2100; 4G LTE Bands 1, 3, 5, 7, 8, 20
- Form factor: Slate
- Colors: White, Black, Gold
- Dimensions: 142.3 mm (5.60 in) H 71 mm (2.8 in) W 7.9 mm (0.31 in) D
- Weight: 138 g (4.9 oz)
- Operating system: Android 5.1.1 "Lollipop"; TouchWiz Android 6.0.1 Marshmallow (USA models only) Android 7.0 "Nougat"; TouchWiz (USA models only) Unofficial: Android 10 "Quince Tart" via crDroid 6 by Lost-Entrepreneur439 (Exynos 3475 model only)
- System-on-chip: Spreadtrum SC9830I (International) (32 bit); Exynos 3475 (North American models) (32 bit)
- CPU: Quad-core (4×1.5 GHz) ARM Cortex-A7; Quad-core (4×1.3 GHz) ARM Cortex-A7
- GPU: ARM Mali-400 MP2; ARM Mali-T720 MP1 (Exynos models)
- Modem: Spreadtrum SharkL3 or Exynos Modem
- Memory: 1.5 GB or 2 GB (US models) LPDDR3
- Storage: 8 GB or 16 GB (USA models) eMMC 4.5
- Removable storage: microSD up to 256 GB
- SIM: 1 slot or 2 slots (microSIM)
- Battery: 2600 mAh (removable)
- Charging: 5W charging (5V 1A)
- Rear camera: 8 MP, f/2.2 5 MP, f/2.2 (US)
- Front camera: 5 MP, f/.2.2 2 MP (US)
- Display: 5.0", 720×1280 px (294 ppi) Super AMOLED
- Sound: 3.5mm headphone jack
- Connectivity: WLAN 802.11b/g/n, Bluetooth 4.1, GPS/GLONASS, NFC (some markets), microUSB 2.0, 3.5 mm headphone jack
- Data inputs: Accelerometer, proximity sensor
- Model: SM-J3109, SM-J320x (x varies by carrier and region)
- Codename: j3xlte, j3xnlte, j3ltexxx (US models)
- Other: FM radio, Dual SIM (Duos only) VoLTE and VoWiFi support (VoLTE is more likely to work)

The Samsung Galaxy J3 (2016) (also known as Galaxy J3 V, Galaxy J3 Pro, Galaxy Amp Prime, and Galaxy Express Prime) is an Android smartphone manufactured by Samsung Electronics and was released on 6 May 2016.

== Specifications ==
=== Hardware ===
The Galaxy J3 (2016) is powered by an Spreadtrum SC9830 SoC including a quad-core 1.5 GHz ARM Cortex-A7 CPU, an ARM Mali-400 GPU with 1.5 GB RAM and 8/16 GB of internal storage. The J3 Pro has 2 GB RAM and 16 GB internal storage. Both can be upgraded up to 256 GB via microSD card.

It features a 5.0-inch Super AMOLED display with a HD Ready resolution. The 8 MP rear camera has f/2.2 aperture. The front camera has 5 MP, also with f/2.2 aperture.

=== Software ===
The J3 (2016) is originally shipped with Android 5.1.1 "Lollipop" and Samsung's TouchWiz user interface. Only US models came with 6.0.1 "Marshmallow" and are upgradable up to Android 7.0 "Nougat".

== Branded versions ==
Some mobile carriers released branded versions of the Galaxy J3 (2016) with slightly different specifications.

Verizon released a branded version called J3 V (SM-J320V) which is powered by an Exynos 3475 SoC including a quad-core 1.2 GHz ARM Cortex-A7, an ARM Mali-T720 with 1.5 GB RAM and 8 GB internal storage. Furthermore it has a 5 MP main camera with f/2.2 aperture and a 2 MP front camera. It is shipped with Android 6.0.1 Marshmallow". The AT&T model (SM-J320A) features the same specifications except for a quad-core 1.3 GHz Cortex-A7 and 16 GB internal storage.

Sprint, Virgin Mobile and Boost Mobile offered the Galaxy J3 (SM-J320P) with the same Exynos 3475 SoC as the J3 V but with 16 GB of storage and Android 5.1.1 "Lollipop".

== See also ==
- Samsung Galaxy
- Samsung Galaxy J series
