= AMOLED =

Display technology for use in mobile devices and televisions

Active-matrix organic light-emitting diode
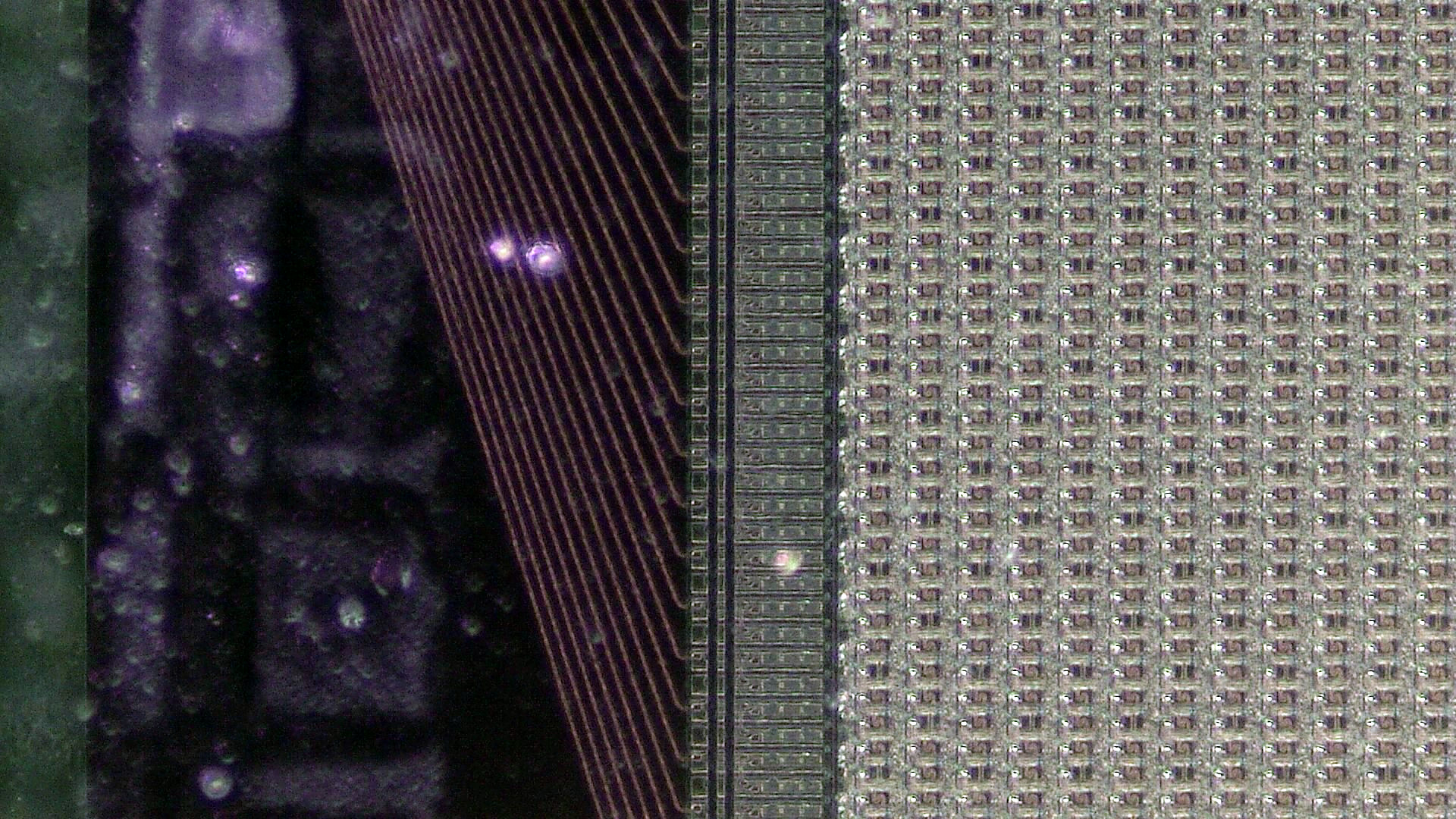
- Component type: Organic light-emitting diode

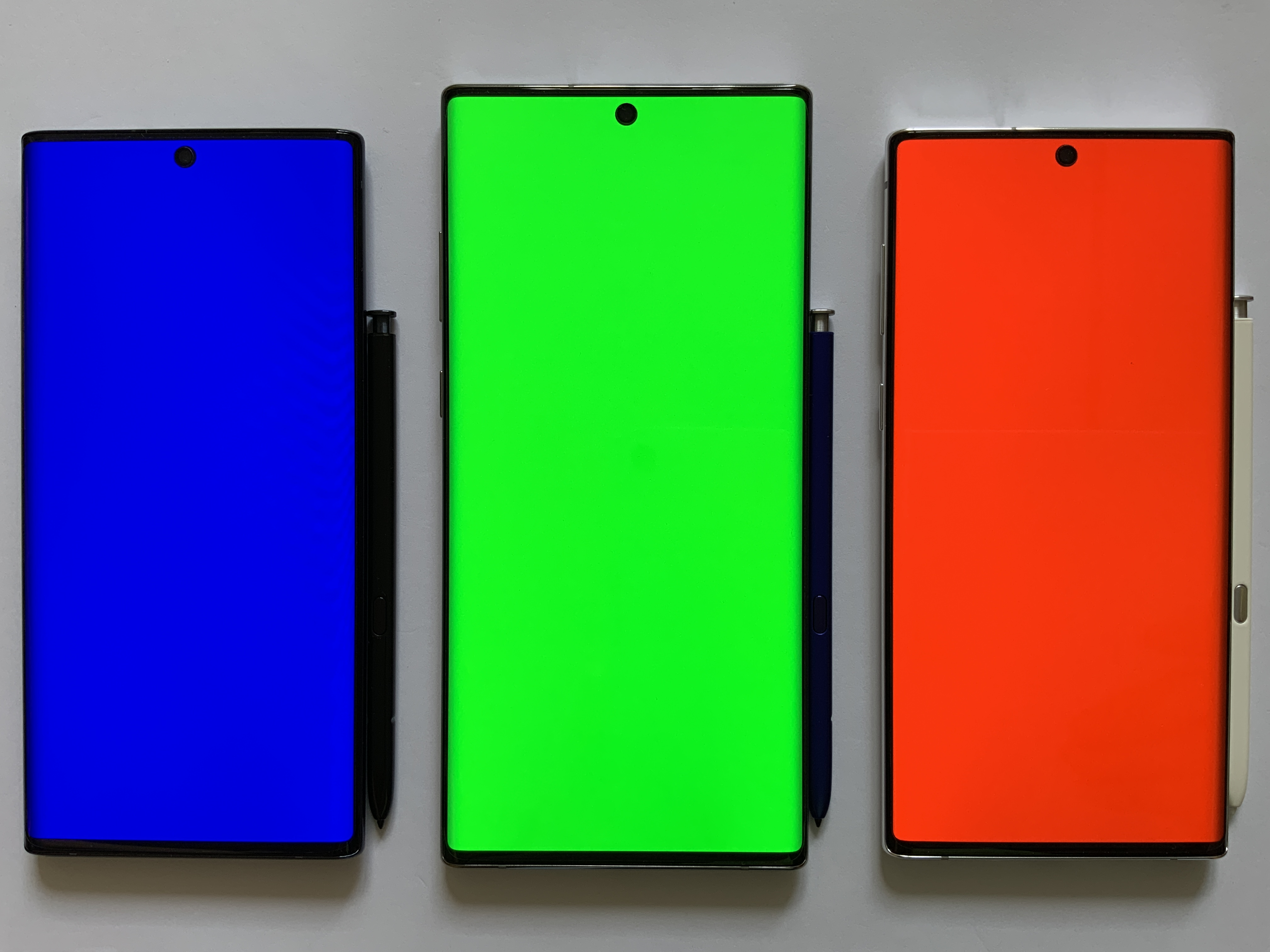
Samsung Dynamic AMOLED screens on Samsung Galaxy Note 10

Active-matrix organic light-emitting diode (AMOLED) screens are a type of OLED display device technology. OLED describes a specific type of thin-film-display technology in which organic compounds form the electroluminescent material, and active matrix refers to the technology behind the addressing of pixels.

Since 2010, AMOLED displays have been used in mobile phones, media players, TVs, and digital cameras. Development of the technology focuses on reducing power usage, lowering manufacturing costs, and increasing screen resolutions (e.g., 8K).

== Design ==
An AMOLED display consists of an active matrix of OLED pixels generating light (luminescence) upon electrical activation that have been deposited or integrated onto a thin-film transistor (TFT) array, which functions as a series of switches to control the current flowing to each individual pixel.

Typically, this continuous current flow is controlled by at least two TFTs at each pixel (to trigger the luminescence), with one TFT to start and stop the charging of a storage capacitor and the second to provide a voltage source at the level needed to create a constant current to the pixel, thereby eliminating the need for the very high currents required for passive-matrix OLED operation.

TFT backplane technology is crucial in the fabrication of AMOLED displays. In AMOLEDs, the two primary TFT backplane technologies, polycrystalline silicon (poly-Si) and amorphous silicon (a-Si), are currently used offering the potential for directly fabricating the active-matrix backplanes at low temperatures (below 150 °C) onto flexible plastic substrates for producing flexible AMOLED displays.

== History ==
AMOLED display research was initiated by Steven Van Slyke and Ching Wan Tang, who pioneered the organic light-emitting diode (OLED) technology at Eastman Kodak Co. in 1979. The first AMOLED displays were introduced in late 2008, with Samsung being the first company to commercialize AMOLED displays. One of the earliest consumer electronics products with an AMOLED display was the mobile handset, BenQ-Siemens S88. In 2007, the iriver Clix 2 portable media player. In 2008 it appeared on the Nokia N85 followed by the Samsung i7110 - both Nokia and Samsung Electronics were early adopters of this technology on their smartphones.

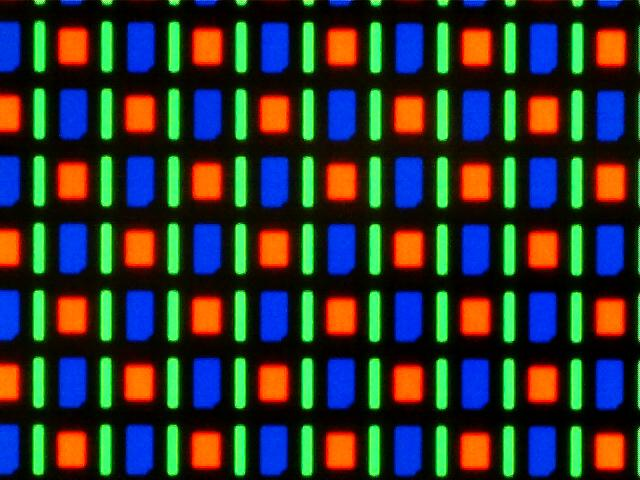
Magnified image of the AMOLED screen on the Nexus One smartphone using the RGBG system of the PenTile matrix family

=== Future development ===
Manufacturers have developed in-cell touch panels, integrating the production of capacitive sensor arrays in the AMOLED module fabrication process. Researchers at DuPont used computational fluid dynamics (CFD) software to optimize coating processes for a new solution-coated AMOLED display technology that is competitive in cost and performance with existing chemical vapor deposition (CVD) technology. Using custom modeling and analytic approaches, Samsung has developed short and long-range film-thickness control and uniformity that is commercially viable at large glass sizes.

As of the mid-2020s, Samsung Display has established itself as the world's leading AMOLED manufacturer by both volume and revenue, producing roughly 500 million AMOLED panels annually for use in smartphones, wearables, tablets, and laptops.According to Samsung Display's own 2025 investor presentation, the company held a 46 percent share of the global smartphone AMOLED display market, based on data from the market research firm Omdia. Samsung Display has also developed ultra-thin AMOLED panels approximately 0.7 mm thick, built on an oxide thin-film-transistor backplane rather than amorphous silicon, which the company says cut power consumption by as much as 47% and, for the first time, support a flicker-free variable refresh rate as low as 1 Hz.

== Comparison to other display technologies ==
AMOLED displays are proved to be better at providing higher refresh rates than those of passive-matrix, often have response times less than a millisecond, and they consume significantly less power. This characteristic makes active-matrix OLEDs suitable for portable electronics. AMOLED displays can also consume less power than passive-matrix OLEDs because each pixel is controlled individually and emits its own light, which reduces energy consumption when displaying darker content.

Schematic of an active-matrix OLED display

The amount of power the display consumes varies significantly depending on the color and brightness shown. As an example, one old OLED display consumes 0.3 watts while showing white text on a black background, but more than 0.7 watts showing black text on a white background, while an LCD may consume only a constant 0.35 watts regardless of what is being shown on screen. A new FHD+ or WQHD+ display will consume much more. Because the black pixels turn completely off, AMOLED also has contrast ratios that are significantly higher than LCDs.

AMOLED displays are often difficult to see in direct sunlight compared with LCDs because of their reduced maximum brightness. Super AMOLED addresses this issue by reducing the size of gaps between layers of the screen. Additionally, PenTile technology is often used for a higher resolution display while requiring fewer subpixels than needed otherwise, sometimes resulting in a display less sharp and more grainy than a non-PenTile display with the same resolution. The organic materials used in AMOLED displays are very prone to degradation over a relatively short period of time, resulting in color shifts as one color fades faster than another, image persistence, or burn-in.

== Super AMOLED ==
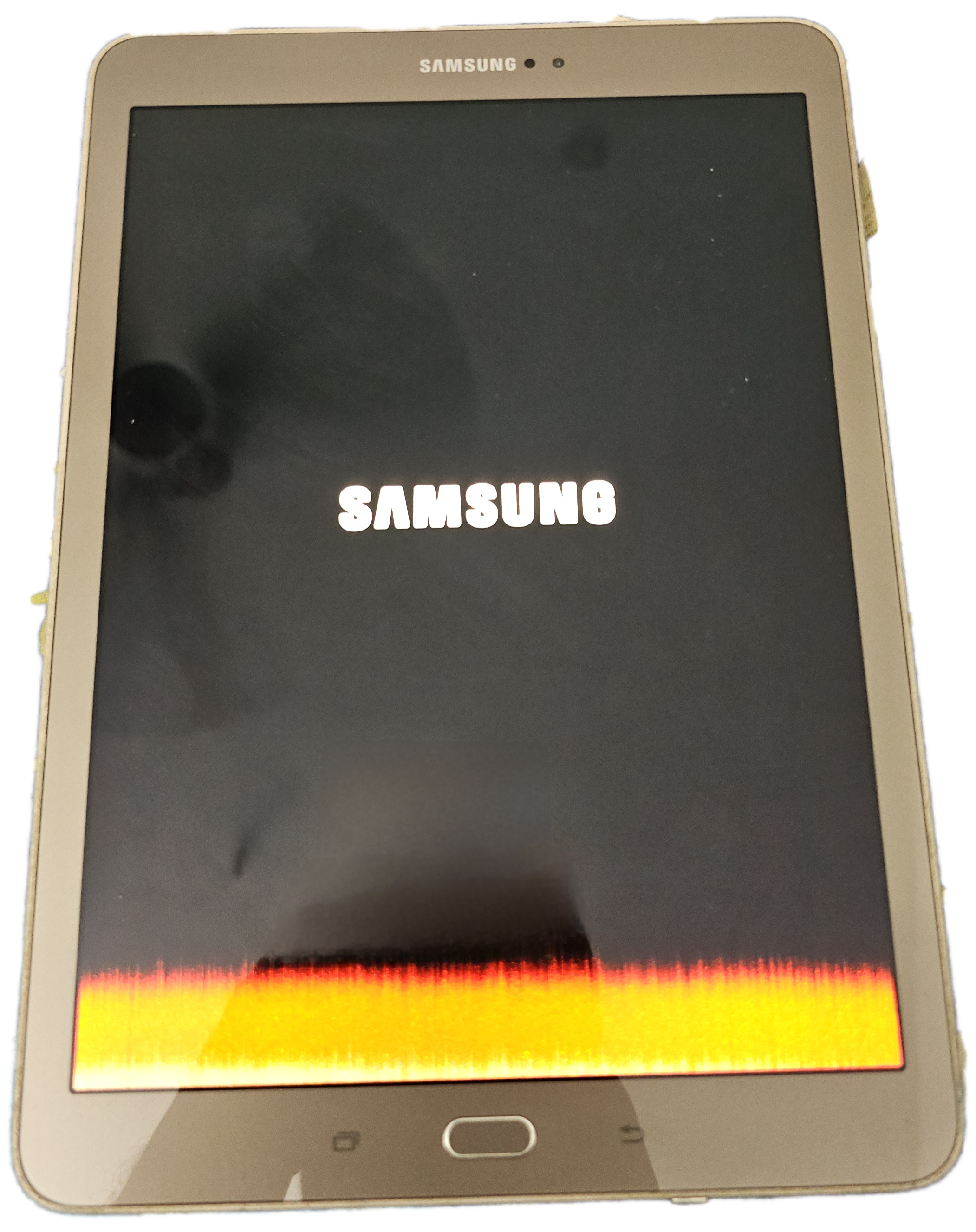
Screen burn-in on a tablet with a Super AMOLED display

Super AMOLED is a marketing term created by Samsung for an AMOLED display where the touch screen digitizer, the layer that detects touch, is integrated into the display and cannot be separated from the display itself, rather than being overlaid on top of it. Compared with conventional LCDs, AMOLED displays generally have lower power consumption under certain conditions, higher contrast ratios, and faster response times. According to Samsung, its Super AMOLED displays offer a 20% brighter screen, 20% lower power consumption, and 80% less sunlight reflection compared to first-generation AMOLED displays. The generic term for this technology is One Glass Solution (OGS), a touchscreen technology that combines the touch sensor and cover glass into a single layer, reducing overall thickness and improving optical clarity. This is achieved by coating and etching the ITO (Indium Tin Oxide) layer directly onto the cover glass, eliminating the need for a separate sensor glass and an air gap.

Drawbacks of Super AMOLED displays include higher manufacturing costs, a susceptibility to screen burn-in, and a shorter operating lifespan compared to alternative display technologies.

== Devices with AMOLED and Super AMOLED ==
Below is a mapping table of marketing terms versus resolutions and sub-pixel types. Note how the pixel density relates to choices of sub-pixel type.

Term	Reso- lution	Size (inches)	PPI	Color depth (bits)	Pixel layout	Used in
AMOLED	320×240	2.2	182			iriver clix 2
AMOLED	320×240	2.6	154		RGBG PenTile	Nokia N85
AMOLED; Capacitive Touchscreen	640×360	3.2	229		RGBG PenTile	Nokia C6-01
Super AMOLED	640×360	3.5	210		RGB S-Stripe	Nokia N8
Super AMOLED	640×360	4.0	184		RGB S-Stripe	Nokia 808 PureView
Super AMOLED	720×720	3.1	328		RGB S-Stripe	BlackBerry Q10
Super AMOLED	854×480	3.9	251		RGBG PenTile	Nokia N9
Super AMOLED	800×480	4.0	233		RGBG PenTile	Samsung Galaxy S
Super AMOLED	960×540	4.3	256		RGB S-Stripe	Samsung Galaxy S4 Mini
Super AMOLED	1280×768	4.5	332		RGBG PenTile	Nokia Lumia 1020
Super AMOLED Plus	800×480	4.3 (4.27)	218		RGB stripe	Samsung Galaxy S II
Super AMOLED Advanced	960×540	4.3	256		RGBG PenTile	Motorola Droid RAZR
HD Super AMOLED	1280×800	5.3 (5.29)	285		RGBG PenTile	Samsung Galaxy Note
HD Super AMOLED	1280×720	5.0	295		RGB S-Stripe	BlackBerry Z30; Samsung Galaxy J7; Samsung Galaxy J5; Samsung Galaxy E5; Samsung Galaxy J3 (2016)
HD Super AMOLED	1280×720	4.7 (4.65)	316		RGBG PenTile	Samsung Galaxy Nexus
HD Super AMOLED	1280×720	4.7 (4.65)	316		RGB S-Stripe	Moto X (1st generation)
HD Super AMOLED	1280×720	4.8	306		RGBG PenTile	Samsung Galaxy S III
HD Super AMOLED	1280×720	5.6 (5.55)	267		RGB S-Stripe	Samsung Galaxy Note II
HD Super AMOLED	1280×720	5.6 (5.55)	267		RGB S-Stripe	Samsung Galaxy Note 3 Neo
HD Super AMOLED Plus	1280×800	7.7	197		RGB stripe	Samsung Galaxy Tab 7.7
Full HD Super AMOLED	1920×1080	5.5	400		RGBG PenTile	Meizu MX5
Full HD Super AMOLED	1920×1080	5.0 (4.99)	441		RGBG PenTile	Samsung Galaxy S4
Full HD Super AMOLED	1920×1080	5.0 (4.99)	441		RGBG PenTile	OnePlus X
Full HD Super AMOLED	1920×1080	5.0 (4.99)	441		RGBG PenTile	Google Pixel
Full HD Super AMOLED	1920×1080	5.2	423		RGBG PenTile	Motorola Moto X (2nd gen)
Full HD Super AMOLED	1920×1080	5.1	432		RGBG PenTile	Samsung Galaxy S5
Full HD Super AMOLED	1920×1080	5.5	401		RGBG PenTile	OnePlus 3 OnePlus 3T; OnePlus 5
Full HD Super AMOLED	1920×1080	5.7	388		RGBG PenTile	Samsung Galaxy Note 3
Full HD+ Super AMOLED	2160×1080	6.0	402		RGBG PenTile	Google Pixel 3
Full HD+ Super AMOLED	2160×1080	6.0	402		RGBG PenTile	Huawei Mate 10 Pro
Full HD+ Super AMOLED	2220x1080	6.01	411		RGBG PenTile	Samsung Galaxy A8+ (2018)
Full HD+ Super AMOLED	2220x1080	5.61	441		RGBG PenTile	Samsung Galaxy A8 (2018)
Super Retina HD	2436×1125	5.8 (5.85)	458		RGBG PenTile	Apple iPhone X iPhone XS iPhone 11 Pro
Super Retina HD	2688×1242	6.5 (6.46)	458		RGBG PenTile	iPhone XS Max iPhone 11 Pro Max
WQHD Super AMOLED	2560×1440	5.1	577		RGBG PenTile	Samsung Galaxy S6; Samsung Galaxy S6 Edge; Samsung Galaxy S6 Active; Samsung Galaxy S7; Samsung Galaxy S7 Active
WQHD Super AMOLED	2560×1440	5.2	564		RGBG PenTile	Microsoft Lumia 950
WQHD Super AMOLED	2560×1440	5.2	565		RGBG PenTile	Motorola Droid Turbo
WQHD Super AMOLED	2560×1440	5.4	540		RGBG PenTile	BlackBerry Priv
WQHD Super AMOLED	2560×1440	5.5	534		RGBG PenTile	BlackBerry DTEK60; Samsung Galaxy S7 Edge; Google Pixel XL; Alcatel Idol 4S vodafone smart platinum 7(Alcatel Sol Prime); Moto Z Moto Z Force; ZTE Axon 7
WQHD Super AMOLED	2560×1440	5.7	515	8	RGBG PenTile	Samsung Galaxy Note 4 Samsung Galaxy Note 5 Samsung Galaxy S6 Edge+ Nexus 6P; Samsung Galaxy Note 7
WQHD Super AMOLED	2560×1440	5.7	518	8	RGBG PenTile	Microsoft Lumia 950 XL
WQHD Super AMOLED	2960×1440	5.8	571	8	RGBG PenTile	Samsung Galaxy S8; Samsung Galaxy S9
WQHD Super AMOLED	2960×1440	6.2	529	8	RGBG PenTile	Samsung Galaxy S8+ Samsung Galaxy S9+
WQHD Super AMOLED	2960×1440	6.3	521	8	RGBG PenTile	Samsung Galaxy Note 8
WQHD Super AMOLED	2960×1440	6.4	514	8	RGBG PenTile	Samsung Galaxy Note 9
WQXGA Super AMOLED	2560×1600	8.4	359	8	RGBG PenTile	Samsung Galaxy Tab S 8.4
WQXGA Super AMOLED	2560×1600	10.5	287	8	RGB S-Stripe	Samsung Galaxy Tab S 10.5
3K AMOLED	2880×1600	3.5	615	8	(unknown)	HTC Vive Focus Plus
Dynamic AMOLED	2280x1080 3040x1440 2280x1080 3040x1440 3040x1440	5.8 6.1 6.3 6.4 6.8	438 550 401 522 498	8		Samsung Galaxy S10e Samsung Galaxy S10 Samsung Galaxy Note 10 Samsung Galaxy S10+ Samsung Galaxy Note 10+ Samsung Galaxy Fold Samsung Galaxy Z Flip
Dynamic AMOLED 2X	2208×1768 2400x1080 3200x1440	7.6 6.1 6.4 6.7 6.8 6.9	373 (Display resolution for Samsung Galaxy Z Fold 2) 386 (External display resolution for Samsung Galaxy Z Fold 2) 563 525 511 421 394 515 411 374 (Display resolution for Samsung Galaxy Z Fold 3); 389 (External display resolution for Samsung Galaxy Z Fold 3)	8	RGBG PenTile	Samsung Galaxy S20 Samsung Galaxy S20+ Samsung Galaxy S20 Ultra (Samsung Galaxy Note 20) (Samsung Galaxy Note 20 Ultra) Samsung Galaxy Z Fold 2 Samsung Galaxy S21 Samsung Galaxy S21+ Samsung Galaxy S21 Ultra Samsung Galaxy S21 FE Samsung Galaxy Z Fold 3 Samsung Galaxy Z Flip 3 Samsung Galaxy S22 Samsung Galaxy S22+ Samsung Galaxy S22 Ultra Samsung Galaxy Z Fold 4 Samsung Galaxy Z Flip 4 Samsung Galaxy S23 Samsung Galaxy S23+ Samsung Galaxy S23 Ultra Samsung Galaxy Z Fold 5 Samsung Galaxy Z Flip 5 Samsung Galaxy S24 Samsung Galaxy S24+ Samsung Galaxy S24 Ultra Samsung Galaxy S25 Samsung Galaxy S25+ Samsung Galaxy S25 Ultra
Fluid AMOLED	3120x1440	6.67	516	8		OnePlus 7 Pro

== Display devices with AMOLED technologies ==
Flagship smartphones sold in 2020 and 2021 used AMOLED. These displays, such as the one on the Galaxy S21+ / S21 Ultra and Galaxy Note 20 Ultra have often been compared to IPS LCDs, found in phones such as the Xiaomi Mi 10T, Huawei Nova 5T, and Samsung Galaxy A20e. For example, according to ABI Research, the AMOLED display found in the Motorola Moto X draws just 92 mA during bright conditions and 68 mA while dim. On the other hand, compared with the IPS, the yield rate of AMOLED is low; the cost is also higher.

== Future ==
Future displays exhibited from 2011 to 2013 by Samsung have shown flexible, 3D, transparent Super AMOLED Plus displays using very high resolutions and in varying sizes for phones. These unreleased prototypes use a polymer as a substrate removing the need for glass cover, a metal backing, and touch matrix, combining them into one integrated layer.

So far, Samsung plans on branding the newer displays as Youm, or y-octa.

Also planned for the future are 3D stereoscopic displays that use eye-tracking (via stereoscopic front-facing cameras) to provide full resolution 3D visuals.

Recent progress in blue OLED materials, particularly the commercial adoption of thermally activated delayed fluorescence (TADF) and novel phosphorescent compounds, has addressed one of the biggest hurdles for AMOLED displays: the relatively short lifespan and lower efficiency of blue emitters. In 2024, Samsung announced a breakthrough blue OLED with a TADF design, extending operational lifetime up to 100,000 hours and reducing power consumption in high-end AMOLED panels. In July 2025, Samsung Display announced that its latest foldable AMOLED panel, used in the Samsung Galaxy Z Fold7, had passed a durability test of 500,000 folding cycles, verified by the inspection company Bureau Veritas, raising its previous internal testing standard of 200,000 folds. The improved durability was achieved through a shock-resistant panel structure that increased the thickness of the panel's outer ultra-thin glass layer by 50 percent and incorporated a new adhesive material.

== See also ==
- List of flat panel display manufacturers
- microLED
