= T-Mobile myTouch 4G Slide =

Touchscreen slider smartphone

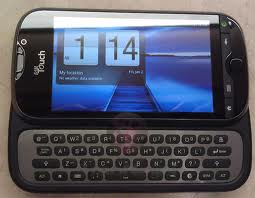
- Brand: T-Mobile
- Manufacturer: HTC Corporation
- Type: Smartphone
- Series: myTouch
- First released: July 26, 2011
- Predecessor: myTouch 4G
- Successor: myTouch, mytouch Q
- Related: T-Mobile G2
- Form factor: Slider
- Dimensions: 4.8 x 2.6 x 0.54 inches (122 x 66 x 14 mm)
- Weight: 6.5 oz (184g)
- Operating system: Android™ 2.3 Android (operating system)
- CPU: 1.2 GHz dual core (Snapdragon)
- Memory: 768 MB
- Storage: 4 GB
- Removable storage: microSD 8 GB
- Battery: Li-ion
- Rear camera: 8-megapixel 1/3.2" sensor, f/2.2, autofocus, LED flash, 1080p recording
- Front camera: 1.3-megapixel, VGA, fixed-focus
- Display: 3.7-inches WVGA Super LCD Touchscreen @ 480 x 800 Pixels
- Connectivity: GSM 850 900 1800 1900 MHz GPRS/EDGE; Triple band UMTS 1700 1900 2100 MHz (4G: 21.1/5.76 Mbps), Wi-Fi (802.11 b/g/n), Bluetooth 3.0 + EDR + A2DP stereo
- Data inputs: Touchscreen
- Other: FM-Radio, GPS navigation, Wi-Fi Hot Spot

The T-Mobile myTouch 4G Slide is a touchscreen slider smartphone designed and manufactured by HTC Corporation for T-Mobile USA's "myTouch" series of phones. It is the fourth of the myTouch family. The myTouch 4G Slide is the first myTouch to feature HTC Espresso 3.0, a graphical user interface similar to HTC Sense 3.0. Highlights include an 8-megapixel camera, the Genius Button, and a hardware keyboard.

The myTouch 4G Slide was unveiled on the T-Mobile website on July 11, 2011. Pre-orders began on July 14, 2011, and the phone was launched on July 26.

== History ==
=== Development ===
During development, the myTouch 4G Slide was known as the "HTC Doubleshot", which was leaked to the public as the phone's official name.

=== Release ===
The myTouch 4G Slide was released to the United States on July 26, 2011 through T-Mobile USA.

== Design ==
The myTouch 4G Slide featured a "black front, brushed metal bumper, and tan or black shell."

The Micro-USB charging port was on the left side of the device. The 3.5-millimeter headphone jack was on the top.

== Hardware ==
=== Physical keyboard and input ===
The myTouch 4G Slide featured face buttons and a touchpad. Its uncommon slide-out QWERTY keyboard had 4 rows and was flat. The volume and power buttons were on the left side. The volume rocker had no physical markings.

The Keyboard is backlit when the Ambient Light Sensor that detects low light, but this leaves the keyboard hard to see in many situations. An aftermarket app called Tasker includes control to force the keyboard backlight to stay on.

The phone has four physical keys on the front: Home, Menu, Back, and the Genius Button; along with an optical trackpad. "Genius" is a custom voice command and text-to-speech system powered by Dragon Dictation technologies. The Genius Button replaces the Search button from the myTouch 3G.

=== Screen ===
The myTouch 4G Slide has a 3.7", 480-by-800 pixel, WVGA Super LCD touchscreen. The multi-touch display is designed to be used with either a bare finger or multiple fingers.

=== Processor and memory ===
The myTouch 4G Slide came with 1GB internal memory storage. The myTouch 4G Slide features a 1.2 GHz dual-core Snapdragon S3 (Adreno 220 GPU) processor and 768 MB RAM, and supports up to a 32 GB MicroSD card (an 8 GB card typically comes with the phone).

=== Cameras ===
The myTouch 4G Slide features a rear-facing 8-megapixel camera capable of recording 1080p video at 30 frames per second, with a dual flash that helps illuminate objects in low-light conditions. The built-in camera software comes with features including Sweepshot, Burstshot, HDR (high dynamic range), and zero shutter lag. In addition, the myTouch 4G Slide has a VGA camera on the front of the device designed for video calls and self-portraits; it is allowed to be used by other applications.

The technology blog Gizmodo stated that the myTouch 4G Slide was "the best camera phone ever". CNET noted that camera lag which contrasted T-Mobile's claims.

=== Battery and power ===
The device comes pre-installed with a 1520 mAh Li-ion rechargeable battery designed to be user-replaceable. Battery life is stated to be 12.4 days in standby using HSPA+ and 9.8 days in 2G, with a talk time of 6.9 hours (HSPA+) or 8.9 hours (2G).

=== Interface ===
A modified HTC Sense 3.0 user interface was added to the 4G Slide. Some differences in the Sense modification include a different screen bottom designed specifically for 4G slide, and having only 5 desktop screens instead of the original 7.

=== Alternative firmware ===
There is an unofficial port of CyanogenMod 11.0 (Android 4.4.2) for the device; the CyanogenMod development team is making efforts towards official inclusion in the list of supported devices. Various other mods and firmware releases also exist.

=== Networks ===
The device features quad-band (850/900/1800/1900) GSM connectivity for 2G networks. For HSPA+ UMTS bands I, II and IV are supported, providing speeds up to 21.1 Mbit/s download and 5.76 Mbit/s upload.

== See also ==
- List of Android devices
- Android (operating system)
- T-Mobile myTouch 4G
- Galaxy Nexus
- Trackpad
