= Samsung Galaxy Fit (smartphone) =

Smartphone model manufactured by Samsung

- Manufacturer: Samsung Electronics
- Type: Smartphone
- Series: Galaxy
- First released: March 22, 2011; 15 years ago
- Availability by region: 2011
- Compatible networks: GSM GSM 850 / 900 / 1800 / 1900, HSDPA HSDPA 900 / 2100
- Dimensions: 110.2×61.2×12.6 mm (4.34×2.41×0.50 in)
- Weight: 108 g (4 oz)
- Operating system: Android 2.2 (Froyo) upgradable to v2.3 (Gingerbread) With PC (Only)
- CPU: Qualcomm Snapdragon S1 600 MHz ARMv6
- GPU: Adreno 200 GPU
- Memory: 286 MB
- Removable storage: microSD up to 32 GB
- Battery: Li-Ion 1350 mAh
- Rear camera: Digital camera, 5.0-megapixel (auto focus, smile detection, geo-tagging)
- Display: 240 × 320 pixels 64-bit color, 3.3-inch multitouch screen
- Connectivity: Bluetooth v2.1 with A2DP, microUSB v2.0
- Data inputs: Multi-touch, capacitive touchscreen, A-GPS, push buttons

The Samsung Galaxy Fit S5670 is a smartphone manufactured by Samsung that runs the open-source Android operating system.

It was announced at the 2011 Mobile World Congress as one of four Samsung low-end smartphones, along with the Galaxy Ace, Galaxy Gio and Galaxy Mini.

== Key features ==
Sources:

- Multi-touch capacitive touchscreen
- Quad-Band GSM and dual-band 3G support
  - 7.2 Mbit/s HSDPA
- 3.3 in (84 mm) 65K-color QVGA TFT touchscreen
- Qualcomm Snapdragon S1 MSM7227 system-on-chip
  - ARMv6 (ARM11) 600 MHz CPU
  - Adreno 200 GPU
- 286 MB RAM
- 160 MB internal storage, hot-swappable microSD slot, 2 GB card included
- Android OS v2.2.1 (Froyo) with TouchWiz v3.0 UI, upgradable to v2.3 (Gingerbread)
- 5 MP camera with auto-focus and geo-tagging
- GPS receiver with A-GPS
- FM radio with RDS and Radio Text
- 3.5 mm audio jack
- Quick Office
- Accelerometer and proximity sensor
- Swype virtual keyboard
- MicroUSB port (charging and data transfer) and stereo Bluetooth 2.1
- SNS (Social networking service) integration
- Image/Video editor
- Compass

== See also ==
- List of Android devices
