= T-Mobile myTouch by LG =

Smartphone model

T-Mobile myTouch Q by LG & T-Mobile myTouch by LG
- Brand: T-Mobile
- Manufacturer: LG Corporation
- Type: Smartphone
- Series: myTouch, Android
- First released: United States 2010 (T-Mobile USA)
- Predecessor: myTouch 4G Slide & myTouch 4G
- Successor: unnamed Huawei U8680 & U8730
- Compatible networks: GSM 850/900/1800/1900; GPRS Class 10; EDGE Class 10 UMTS Bands I and IV; HSPA+ 14.4, HSUPA 5.76
- Form factor: Slider-Keyboard & Slate
- Dimensions: Q version: 4.76 in (121 mm) H 2.50 in (64 mm) W 0.51 in (13 mm) D non-Q version: 4.82 in (122 mm) H 2.46 in (62 mm) W 0.385 in (9.8 mm) D
- Weight: 5.64 oz (160 g), Q 3.77 oz (107 g), non-Q
- Operating system: Android 2.3.6 Gingerbread
- CPU: 1GHz Snapdragon
- Memory: 512 MB RAM
- Storage: 4 GB (1 GB available for storage)
- Removable storage: 8 GB microSD flash memory (supports up to 32 GB)
- Battery: ?1,400? mAh Internal rechargeable Li-ion, user replaceable
- Rear camera: Photo 5 megapixel Note that Q does not have a flash. NOT CHECKED: 2592 × 1456 px max Autofocus; LED flash Video 1280×720 px max (720p)
- Front camera: VGA, non-Q only
- Display: Q version: 3.5" 320x480 HVGA TFT LCD screen non-Q version: 3.8" 480x800 WVGA AMOLED screen
- Connectivity: 3.5 mm TRRS; Bluetooth 2.1 + EDR with A2DP; FM radio Micro USB 2.0; Wi-Fi 802.11b/g/n
- Data inputs: NOT VERIFIED: Multi-touch capacitive touchscreen 3-axis accelerometer A-GPS; Ambient light sensor Magnetometer; Microphone; Proximity sensor Push buttons Touchpad
- SAR: Head 0.94 W/kg; Body 1.03 W/kg
- Hearing aid compatibility: M3
- Other: Wi-Fi hotspot USB tethering

The T-Mobile myTouch Q by LG (C800) and the T-Mobile myTouch by LG (E739) are smartphones designed and manufactured by LG Corporation for T-Mobile USA's "myTouch" re-branded series of phones. They run the Android 2.3.6 "Gingerbread" software.

== Features ==
The myTouch 4G supports Wi-Fi, 3G UMTS and HSPA+, EDGE, and GPRS networks. The myTouch 4G is supported by T-Mobile 4G. The myTouch 4G also supports Wi-Fi Calling.

The two phones have similar features except for these differences:

- The "Q" does have a slider-keyboard, the non-Q is a keyboardless design,
- The "Q" is both thicker and heavier than the non-Q,
- The screen on the "Q" is smaller than that on the non-Q,
- The "Q" does not have a front-facing camera, the non-Q does have one with VGA-resolution,
- The "Q" has a camera feature called "Auto Snap on Smile" that the non-Q apparently does not have.

== Hardware ==
The T-Mobile myTouch 4G runs on a 1GHz Qualcomm Snapdragon processor. It has a 5.0MP camera with auto-focus. Note that the Q (slider) does not have a front-facing camera, and the non-Q (slate) does not have a flash. The non-Q version sports a front-facing video camera for video chat and video calls, has a wireless card supporting a/b/g/n connections, and a bluetooth 2.1+EDR chip. The myTouch by LG has a lithium-ion battery.

== Screen ==
- The myTouch Q by LG has a 3.5" 320x480 HVGA TFT LCD.
- The myTouch by LG has a 3.8" 480x800 WVGA AMOLED display.
