= Samsung Galaxy Core =

Single sim card slot model

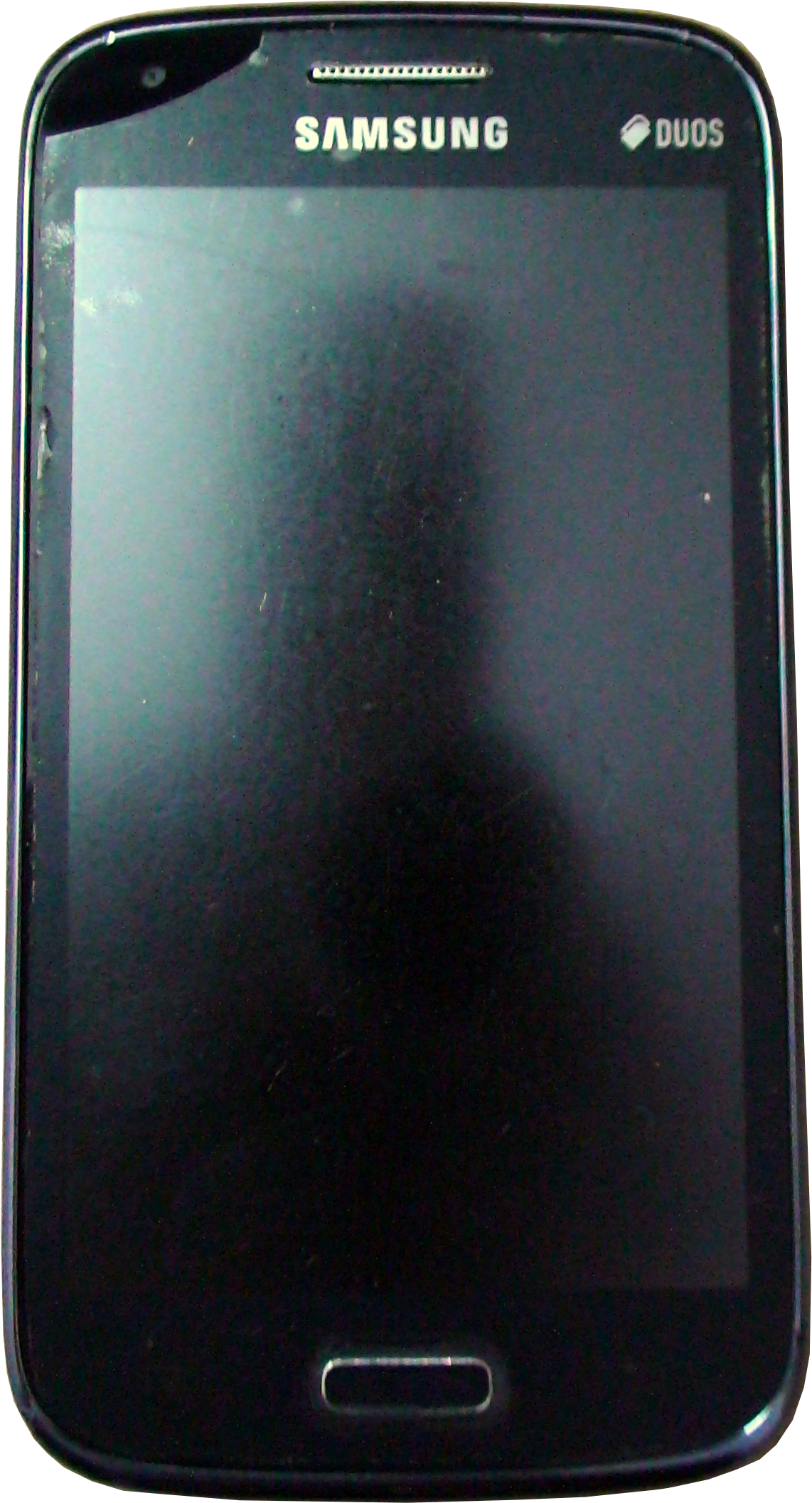
- Samsung Galaxy Core GT-I8262
- Manufacturer: Samsung
- Series: Galaxy
- First released: June 2013
- Predecessor: Samsung Galaxy Ace 2
- Successor: Samsung Galaxy Core 2
- Compatible networks: GSM/GPRS/EDGE; 850 900 1800 1900 MHz; UMTS/HSPA; 850, 900, 2100 MHz
- Form factor: Slate
- Dimensions: 129.3 mm (5.09 in) H 67 mm (2.6 in) W 9 mm (0.35 in) D
- Weight: 124 g (4.4 oz)
- Operating system: Android 4.1.2 Jelly Bean
- System-on-chip: Qualcomm Snapdragon S4 MSM8225 or Qualcomm Snapdragon S4 Play
- CPU: 1.2 GHz Dual Core or 1.0 GHz Dual Core
- GPU: Adreno 203 or Adreno 220
- Memory: 1 GB
- Storage: 8 GB
- Removable storage: MicroSD support for up to 64 GB
- Battery: 1800 mAh
- Rear camera: 5 Megapixel, with LED Flash
- Front camera: VGA, 640x480
- Display: 4.3 inches, 480 x 800 pixels (217 ppi) TFT LCD capacitive touchscreen, 16M colors
- Connectivity: microUSB 2.0, Bluetooth 3.0, Wi-Fi, GPS
- Data inputs: Capacitive Touchscreen, Compass (Magnetometer), Proximity, Accelerometer

The Samsung Galaxy Core is a smartphone manufactured by Samsung Electronics that runs on the open source Android 4.1.2 Jelly Bean operating system. Announced by Samsung in early May 2013, the Dual-SIM model was released in mid-to-late May 2013, and the single-SIM version on July 2013.

== Features ==
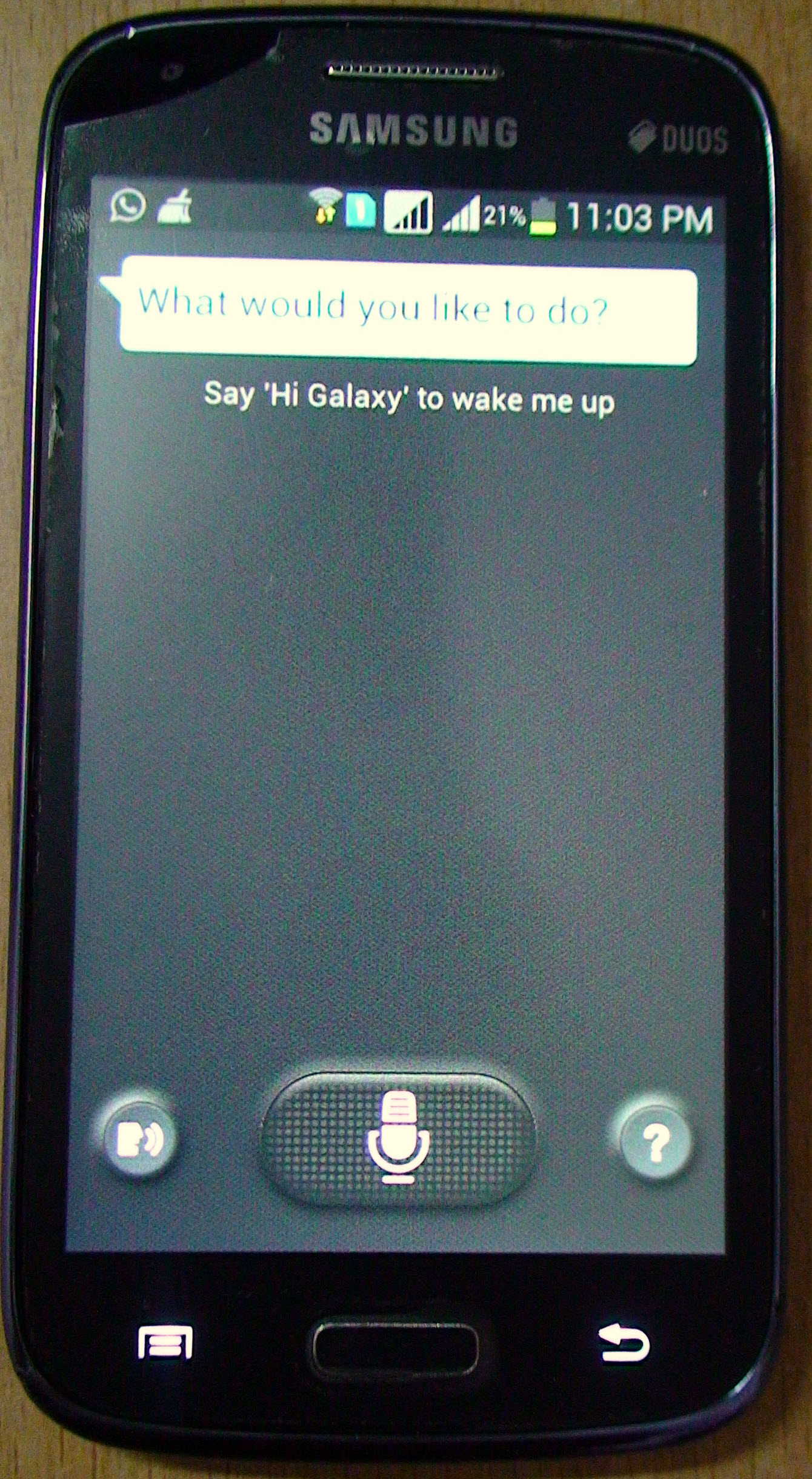
S Voice on Samsung Galaxy Core

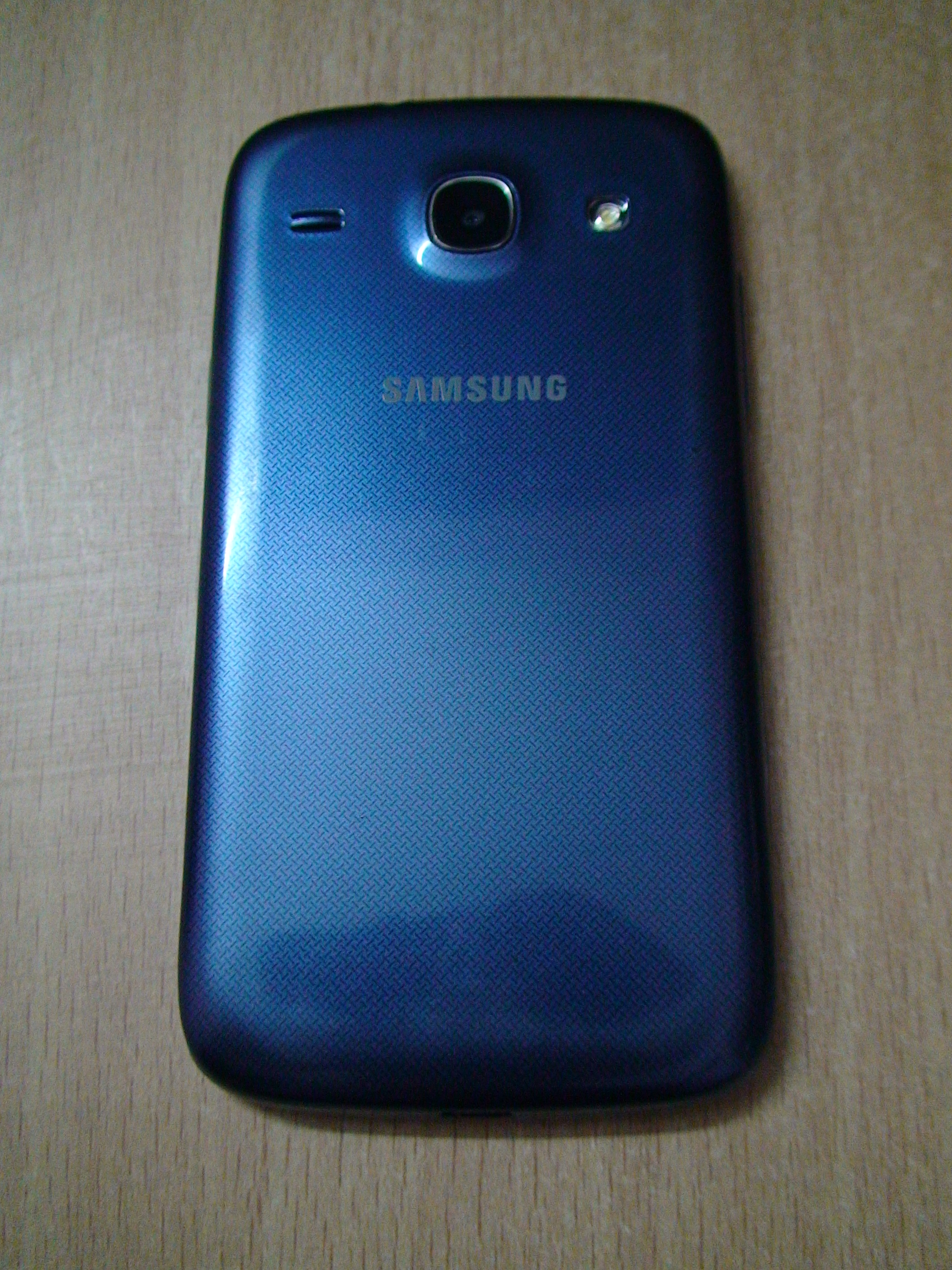
Rear view of Samsung Galaxy Core

The device has similar design and specs to the Samsung Galaxy S III. This phone also has S Voice, which was a feature found on high-end Samsung Galaxy devices. A key selling point of the device was its dual sim capability.

== Model variants ==
=== Galaxy Core Plus (SM-G350) ===
This version of Samsung Galaxy Core was available only in certain European countries. It also shared model codes with the Galaxy Trend 3, Galaxy Star 2 Plus and Galaxy Star Advance (SM-G350L and G350M) Some models have 3MP camera such as SM-G350E. See also the Samsung Galaxy Core Prime which was a more upgraded version, which was more recent and had higher specifications.

=== China ===
==== Galaxy Trend 3 (SM-G3502) ====
Dual SIM version for China, but without flash. Still has a camera though.

==== Galaxy Core 4G (SM-G386F) ====
China Mobile's TD-LTE Model.

==== Galaxy Style (GT-I8260) ====
Single sim card slot.

==== Galaxy Style Duos (GT-I8262) ====
Dual sim card slots.

=== USA ===
==== Galaxy Core Prime (SM-G360P) ====
Released 2014, November; GSM, LTE (Cat4), HSPA, Single SIM (Duos Dual SIM). Quad-core 1.2 GHz Cortex-A53.

== See also ==
- Samsung Galaxy Ace
- Samsung Galaxy SII
- Galaxy Nexus
- Samsung Galaxy Core Prime
