= Samsung Galaxy Ace 4 =

2014 Android smartphone

- Manufacturer: Samsung Electronics
- Type: Smartphone
- Series: Galaxy
- First released: 1 August 2014; 12 years ago
- Predecessor: Samsung Galaxy Ace 3
- Successor: Samsung Galaxy J1 Ace
- Compatible networks: 802.11 b/g/n (b/g/n), Bluetooth 4.0, Quadro-band GSM (DCS 1800 MHz, PCS 1900 MHz, GSM 850 MHz, GSM 900 MHz), Tri-band UMTS (B5 (850), B1 (2100), B8 (900), Penta-band LTE (B7(2600), B8(900), B20(800), B3(1800), B1(2100).
- Form factor: Slate
- Dimensions: 121.4 mm (4.78 in) H; 62.9 mm (2.48 in) W; 10.8 mm (0.43 in) D
- Weight: 123.8 g (4.4 oz)
- Operating system: Android 4.4.2 "KitKat" With TouchWiz; Unofficial: Android 7.1.1 "Nougat" via custom ROMs
- System-on-chip: Qualcomm Snapdragon 410 8916
- CPU: Quad-core 1.2 GHz
- GPU: Qualcomm Adreno 305
- Memory: 1 GB RAM
- Storage: 4 GB
- Removable storage: microSD up to 64 GB
- Battery: 1,900 mAh, 3.8 V, internal rechargeable Li-ion, user replaceable
- Rear camera: 5 Megapixel 2592×1944 max, autofocus, LED flash, HD video recording 1280×720 px MPEG4 at 30 FPS
- Front camera: 1.3 Megapixel
- Display: 4.0 in (100 mm) TFT LCD diagonal. 480×800 px WVGA; 16M colors
- Media: Audio MP3, WAV, AAC, AAC+, eAAC+ Video MP4, H.264, H.263
- Connectivity: 3.5 mm jack Bluetooth v4.0 with A2DP & AVRCP; DLNA; Stereo FM radio with RDS; Micro-USB 2.0; NFC; Wi-Fi 802.11 b/g/n
- Data inputs: Multi-touch, capacitive touchscreen Accelerometer; A-GPS; GLONASS; Push buttons Capacitive touch-sensitive buttons
- SAR: 0.87 W/kg
- Other: Swype keyboard, Google Play

The Samsung Galaxy Ace 4 is a smartphone manufactured by Samsung that runs the Android operating system. Announced in June and released by Samsung in August 2014, the Galaxy Ace 4 is the successor to the Galaxy Ace 3. An LTE model was also announced in 2014.

== Features ==
The device is slightly thicker than its predecessor at 10.8 mm. The Galaxy Ace 4 is slightly heavier than the Ace 3 at 123.8 grams. The phone is available in black, grey and white.

The Galaxy Ace 4 is a 4G smartphone with GSM/HSPA network. It has 4.0-inch capacitive touchscreen with 16 M colours WVGA (480×800) resolution. It has a 5-megapixel camera with LED flash and auto focus, Geo-tagging, face/smile detection, panorama. Capable of recording videos at 720p@30 fps VGA, The Galaxy Ace 4 comes with a 1500 mAh Li-ion battery.

Other specifications remain identical: 1 GB of memory, 8 GB of storage, a micro USB 2.0 port at the bottom and a combined stereo jack at the top. Access to the micro SIM slot and the micro SD slot is possible after removing the back cover.

== Comparison table ==
Model name	Model code	Network	Number of SIMs	Camera	SoC	RAM	Other Features
Samsung Galaxy Ace 4	SM-G313M	3G WCDMA	Single SIM	5.0 MP+0.3 MP	Broadcom BCM21664	512 MB	
Samsung Galaxy Ace 4	SM-G313MU	4G LTE	Single SIM	5.0 MP+0.3 MP	Renesas MP5232	1 GB	
Samsung Galaxy Ace 4	SM-G313F	4G LTE	Single SIM	5.0 MP+0.3 MP	Renesas MP5232	1 GB	NFC
Samsung Galaxy Ace 4	SM-G3139	CDMA	No SIM	5.0 MP	Snapdragon 200 MSM8610	768 MB	
Samsung Galaxy Ace 4 Lite	SM-G313ML	3G WCDMA	Dual SIM	3.0 MP	Spreadtrum SC7715	512 MB	
Samsung Galaxy Ace Style	SM-G357FZ	4G/LTE	Single SIM	5.0 MP	Snapdragon 410 MSM8916	1 GB	NFC
Samsung Galaxy Ace Style	SM-G357M	4G/LTE	Single SIM	5.0 MP	Snapdragon 410 MSM8916	1 GB	
Samsung Galaxy Ace Style	SM-G310H	3G WCDMA	Dual SIM	5.0 MP	Broadcom BCM21664	512 MB	
Samsung Galaxy Ace Style	SM-G310HN	3G WCDMA	Single SIM	5.0 MP	Broadcom BCM21664	512 MB	
Samsung Galaxy Ace NXT; Samsung Galaxy V Samsung Galaxy Trend Neo	SM-G313H	3G WCDMA	Single SIM	3.0 MP	Spreadtrum SC7715	512 MB	
Samsung Galaxy Ace 4 Lite	SM-G313U	3G WCDMA	Single SIM	5.0 MP+0.3 MP	Spreadtrum SC7715	512 MB	
Samsung Galaxy Trend 2 Samsung Galaxy Ace 4 Lite; Samsung Galaxy Vivalto 3G	SM-G313HN	3G WCDMA	Single SIM	5.0 MP	Broadcom BCM21663	512 MB	NFC
Samsung Galaxy S Duos 3	SM-G313HU	3G WCDMA	Dual SIM	5.0 MP	Broadcom BCM21663	512 MB	
Samsung Galaxy S Duos 3 VE	SM-G316HU	3G WCDMA	Dual SIM	5.0 MP	Broadcom BCM21663	512 MB	

== See also ==
- Samsung Galaxy Ace
- Samsung Galaxy Ace 3
- Samsung Galaxy Pocket 2
- Samsung Galaxy Trend 2 Lite (SM-G318H/HZ)
