= Samsung Galaxy Ace Plus =

Smartphone released by Samsung

Samsung Galaxy Ace Plus GT-S7500
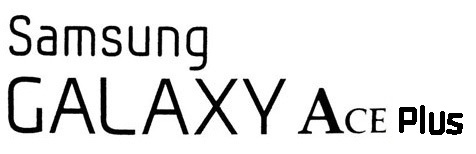
- Manufacturer: Samsung Electronics
- Type: Smartphone
- Series: Galaxy
- First released: 4 January 2012; 14 years ago
- Availability by region: UK 17 March 2012
- Predecessor: Samsung Galaxy Ace
- Successor: Samsung Galaxy Ace 2
- Compatible networks: GSM 850/900/1800/1900; HSDPA 7.2 Mbps 900/2100 (Canada HSPA 850/1900)
- Form factor: Slate
- Dimensions: 114.7×62.5×11.2 mm (4.52×2.46×0.44 in)
- Weight: 115 g (4.1 oz)
- Operating system: Android 2.3.6 "Gingerbread" with TouchWiz
- CPU: Qualcomm S1 MSM7227A 1 GHz Cortex A5 processor
- GPU: Adreno 200 GPU, 200 MHz
- Memory: 512 MB
- Storage: 3 GB
- Removable storage: microSD (supports up to 32 GB)
- Battery: 1,300 mAh, 5.0 Wh, 3.7 V, internal rechargeable Li-ion, user replaceable
- Rear camera: 5.0-megapixel 2592x1944 max, 3x digital zoom, autofocus, LED flash, VGA video recording 640x480 px MPEG4 at 30 fps max.
- Front camera: None
- Display: TFT LCD, 3.65 in (93 mm) diagonal. 320x480 px (158ppi) HVGA; 16M colors
- Connectivity: 3.5 mm jack Bluetooth v3.0 with A2DP; DLNA; Stereo FM radio with RDS; Micro-USB 2.0; Wi-Fi 802.11 b/g/n
- Data inputs: Multi-touch, capacitive touchscreen Accelerometer; A-GPS; Digital compass Proximity sensor Push buttons Capacitive touch-sensitive buttons
- SAR: 0.84 W/kg
- Other: Swype keyboard

The Samsung Galaxy Ace Plus (GT-S7500[L/T/W]) is a smartphone model of the Samsung Galaxy Ace (S5830), released by Samsung in 28 February 2012. The phone weighs 115 grams (4.1 oz), has a display size of 3.65 inches (93 mm), and retains the same 320x480 resolution as the original Ace. Various new technologies and features were introduced with the Ace Plus.

== Software and hardware ==
The Ace Plus contains a 1 GHz Qualcomm S1 processor, paired with 512 MB of RAM. It features a single camera on the back equipped with autofocus. The device also includes GPS, microUSB 2.0, Bluetooth, Wi-Fi, an FM radio, 3 GB of internal memory, and a microSD slot capable of supporting up to 32 GB of external memory. The device is not compatible with Android 4.0.4 due to hardware limitations.

=== Instant messaging service ===
The Ace Plus incorporates Samsung’s ChatON. Users can text each other, start multi-person conversations, and share multimedia files using their phone numbers. ChatON is similar to the iPhone’s iMessage and BlackBerry’s BlackBerry Messenger.

=== System and screen control ===
The Ace Plus features the upgraded GUI and TouchWiz 4.0 interface. Users can have up to 7 unique home screens which can be rearranged, deleted, or added at any point as the user wishes.

=== Phone book and social hub ===
The Ace Plus features a phone book with a cloud syncing feature. It also offers a "quick contacts" feature in which the users can quickly access specific contacts.

Social Hub combines the users' email accounts with social networking platforms so that all incoming emails are collected in one list. Users can mark them as favorites and have shortcuts to reply to emails.

=== A-GPS navigation app ===
The Ace Plus has an app called A-GPS, which offers similar functionality to Google Maps. It offers voice-guided navigation in certain countries and displays instructions elsewhere.

== Reception ==
Reception at the time compared the phone against the original Ace and Ace 2.

CNET expressed disappointment with the resolution and suggested that the Ace 2 might be a better choice.

GSMArena praised the phone for its speed and battery life and suggested it as an introductory smartphone.

== See also ==
- Samsung Galaxy Ace
- Samsung Galaxy Ace 2
