= Samsung Galaxy Gio =

Smartphone manufactured by Samsung

Samsung Galaxy Gio GT-S5660

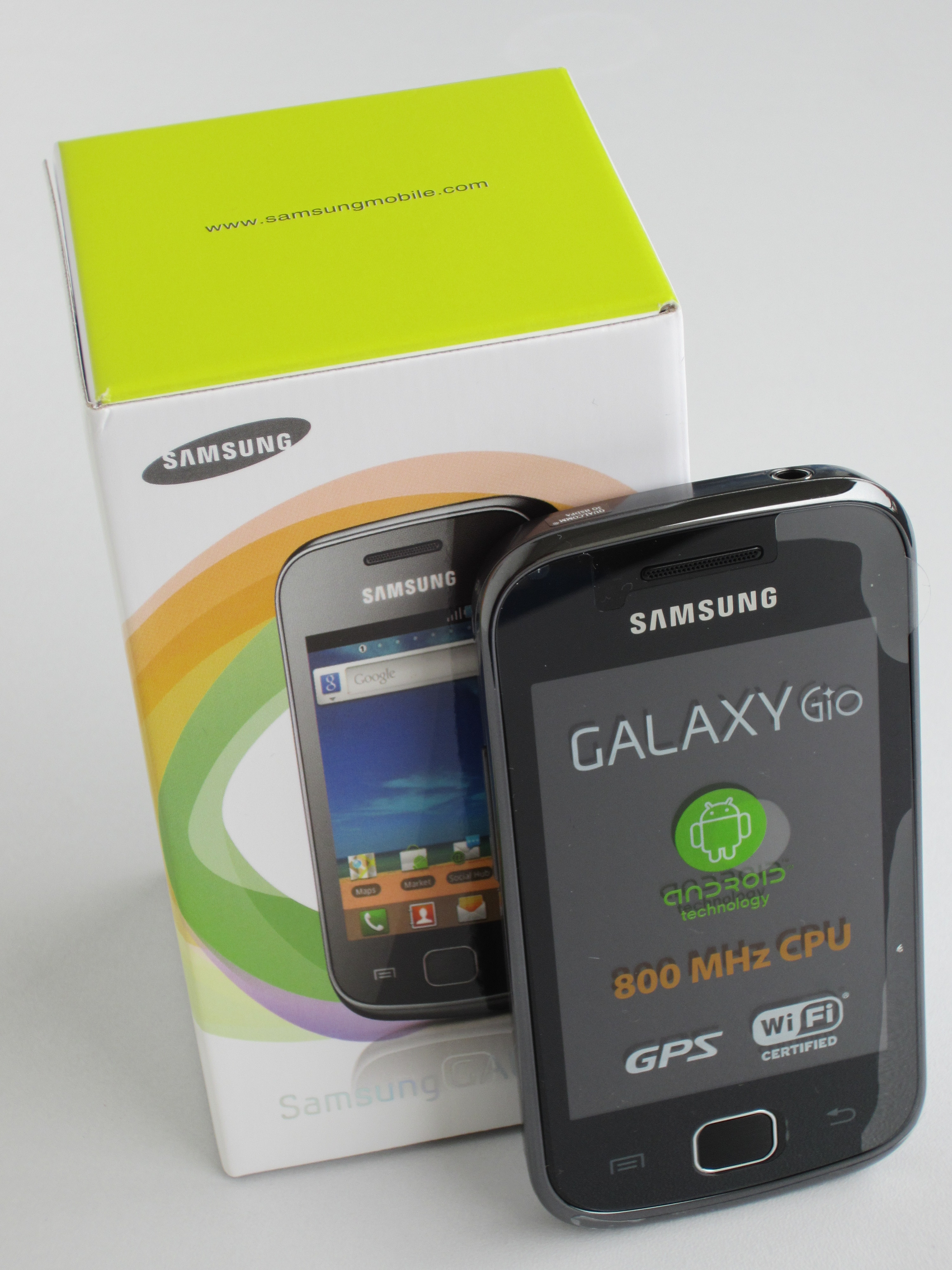
- Developer: Samsung Electronics
- Manufacturer: Samsung Electronics
- Type: Smartphone
- Series: Galaxy
- First released: UK 1 March 2011; 15 years ago
- Predecessor: Samsung Galaxy 3 (Galaxy Apollo/GT-I5800
- Successor: Samsung Galaxy Ace (GT-S5830)
- Compatible networks: GSM 850/900/1800/1900; HSDPA 7.2 Mbps 900/2100
- Form factor: Smartphone
- Dimensions: 110.5 mm (4.35 in) H 57.5 mm (2.26 in) W 12.15 mm (0.478 in) D
- Weight: 102 g (3.6 oz)
- Operating system: Original: Android 2.2 "Froyo"; Current: Android 2.3.6 "Gingerbread"; Unofficial: Android 4.4 "KitKat" via CyanogenMod 11 by Maclaw (now NovaFusion)
- CPU: 800 MHz Qualcomm MSM7227-1 Turbo, ARMv6 O/C to 8=961MHz
- GPU: Adreno 200 GPU
- Memory: 384 MB (accessible: 278 MB)
- Storage: 512 MB (accessible: 150 MB / 181 MB)
- Removable storage: microSDHC (supports up to 32 GB); 2 GB card included
- SIM: miniSIM
- Battery: 1,350 mAh, 5.0 Wh, 3.7 V, internal rechargeable Li-ion, user-replaceable
- Charging: MicroUSB 2.0 port (standard charging speed)
- Rear camera: 3.15 Mpix, 2048×1536 max, autofocus, 2× digital zoom; QVGA video, 320×240@15 fps, MPEG4
- Front camera: None
- Display: TFT LCD, 180 ppi, 3.2 in (81 mm) diagonal 320×480 px HVGA; 16M colors
- Connectivity: 3.5 mm jack Bluetooth v2.1 with A2DP; DLNA; Stereo FM radio with RDS; Micro-USB 2.0; Wi-Fi 802.11 b/g/n
- Data inputs: Multi-touch capacitive touchscreen; Accelerometer; A-GPS; Digital compass; Proximity sensor; Push buttons; capacitive touch-sensitive buttons
- SAR: 0.791 W/kg
- Other: Swype keyboard
- Website: Official website

The Samsung Galaxy Gio (GT-S5660) is a smartphone manufactured by Samsung and running the Android operating system.

Part of the Samsung Galaxy series, it was announced at the 2011 Mobile World Congress as one of four low-end Samsung smartphones, along with the Galaxy Ace, Galaxy Fit and Galaxy Mini.

The Galaxy Gio phone made its Canadian debut in August 2011. Initially available to Bell Canada, the Gio was soon made available at Virgin Mobile Canada and Solo Mobile. Starting in December 2011, Galaxy Gio was also made available in the United States as Samsung Repp on U.S. Cellular.

== Features ==
=== Hardware ===
Galaxy Gio has a 3.2 in (8.1 cm) HVGA multi-touch, capacitive touchscreen, a 3.2-megapixel camera with auto focus, and an 800 MHz Qualcomm MSM7227 & MSM7627 (Us Cellular) Turbo (ARMv6), 278 MB RAM, 158 Mb internal storage, 3G HSPA+, an FM radio with RDS support, GPS, Wi-Fi 802.11 b/g/n, and a 1350 mAh battery. In addition to the phone's internal memory, the device has a MicroSD card slot, and comes with 2 Gb MicroSD card (as new). With that phone, the bundled MicroSD card is the main location for storage of apps and user-generated data, such as photos and multimedia.

=== Software ===
Galaxy Gio originally came with Android 2.2 "Froyo", with Samsung's TouchWiz user interface.

In early August 2011, Samsung officially rolled out the 2.3 "Gingerbread" update via Kies. In September 2011, Samsung rolled out an update in the Netherlands marked "PDA:KPS PHONE:KPA CSC:KP1 (XEN)".

Users can also upgrade to Android 2.3.6 "Gingerbread" via Samsung Kies, and as of October 2012, Android 2.3.4 and 2.3.6 had come preinstalled on many Gios sold throughout the world.

Changes associated with the 2.3.6 update include a new lockscreen, a new phone icon, the blue-glow scrolling effect, and a few other cosmetic changes related to the system UI.

Samsung has not made Android 4.1 available for Gio due to its less powerful hardware, though users can upgrade via Root and ClockworkMod Recovery.

Because the native Android browser is outdated, modern websites can be visited with Firefox for Android by Mozilla. As the Galaxy Gio phone contains a central processor based on ARMv6 architecture, then the most recent Firefox version for ARMv6 devices is 31.3.0esr, released on 17 October 2015. Mozilla have since ceased development for this CPU architecture. The primary method to reduce Firefox resource usage is to install the NoScript Anywhere addon.

== See also ==
- List of Android smartphones
- Galaxy Nexus
