= Samsung Galaxy Ace 2 =

Android smartphone by Samsung Electronics

Samsung Galaxy Ace 2 GT-I8160
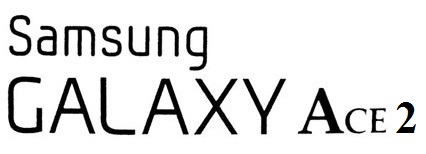
- Manufacturer: Samsung Electronics
- Type: Smartphone
- Series: Galaxy
- First released: UK 22 May 2012; 14 years ago
- Predecessor: Samsung Galaxy Ace; Samsung Galaxy Ace Plus
- Successor: Samsung Galaxy Ace 3 Samsung Galaxy Core
- Related: Samsung Galaxy Mini 2
- Compatible networks: GSM 850/900/1800/1900 MHz 3.5G 900/2100 MHz: HSDPA 14.4 Mbit/s (DL); HSUPA 5.76 Mbit/s (UL); Canada: HSPA 850/1900 MHz
- Form factor: Slate
- Dimensions: 118.3 mm (4.66 in) H 62.3 mm (2.45 in) W 10.5 mm (0.41 in) D
- Weight: 122 g (4.3 oz)
- Operating system: Original: Android 2.3.6 Gingerbread; Current: Android 4.1.2 Jelly Bean; Unofficial: Android 9 Pie via LineageOS 16
- System-on-chip: ST-Ericsson NovaThor U8500
- CPU: Dual-core 800 MHz ARM Cortex-A9
- GPU: ARM Mali-400 MP
- Memory: 768 MB RAM (accessible: 555-645 MB depending on kernel parameters)
- Storage: 4 GB (1.2 GB for apps and 1.1 GB internal Storage) For Custom Partition size (only for Custom Roms): Dependant on each types
- Removable storage: microSD up to 32 GB
- Battery: 1,500 mAh, 5.55 Wh, 3.8 V, internal rechargeable Li-ion, user replaceable
- Rear camera: 5 Mpx 2560x1920 max, autofocus, LED flash, HD video recording 1280x720 px MPEG4 at 30 FPS
- Front camera: VGA
- Display: 3.8 in (97 mm) TFT LCD diagonal. 480x800 px (244ppi) WVGA; 16M colors
- Connectivity: 3.5 mm jack Bluetooth v3.0 with A2DP; DLNA; Stereo FM radio with RDS; Micro-USB 2.0; Near field communication (NFC)* *GT-I8160P model only Wi-Fi 802.11 b/g/n
- Data inputs: Multi-touch, capacitive touchscreen Accelerometer; A-GPS; GLONASS; Digital compass Proximity sensor Push buttons Capacitive touch-sensitive buttons
- Codename: Codina
- SAR: Head: 0.69 W/kg 1 g Body: 1.31 W/kg 1 g Hotspot: -
- Other: Swype keyboard, Google Play, Polaris Office, ChatON, Social Hub, Readers Hub and Game Hub

Samsung Galaxy Ace 2 (GT-I8160) is a smartphone manufactured by Samsung that runs the Android operating system. Announced by Samsung in 22 February 2012 and released in May 2012, the Galaxy Ace 2 is the successor to the Galaxy Ace Plus.

Being a mid-range smartphone, Galaxy Ace 2 contains hardware between that of the Galaxy Ace Plus and Galaxy S Advance; it features a dual-core 800 MHz processor on the NovaThor U8500 chipset with the Mali-400 GPU.

In May 2012, the device went on sale in the United Kingdom.

== Hardware ==
Galaxy Ace 2 is a 3.5G mobile device that offers quad-band GSM, and was announced with dual-band 900/2100 MHz HSDPA at 14.4 Mbit/s downlink and 5.76 Mbit/s uplink speeds. The display is a 3.8-inch capacitive PLS TFT LCD touchscreen with 16M colours in a WVGA (480x800) resolution. There is also a 5-megapixel camera with LED flash and auto-focus, capable of recording videos at QVGA (320x240), VGA (640x480) and HD (1280x720) resolutions. Galaxy Ace 2 also has a front-facing VGA camera. The device comes with a 1500 mAh Li-ion battery.

== Software ==
Galaxy Ace 2 comes with Android 2.3.6 Gingerbread and Samsung's proprietary TouchWiz user interface. In September 2012, Samsung announced that Galaxy Ace 2 would be updated to Android 4.1.2 Jelly Bean. The phone can’t be upgraded to Android 4.3 Jelly Bean due to hardware restrictions.

Galaxy Ace 2 has social network integration abilities and multimedia features. It is also preloaded with basic Google Apps, such as Google+ and Google Talk. The phone is available in Onyx Black and in White colours.

The device also unofficially supports CyanogenMod as well as other AOSP-derived roms like AOKP. It also unofficially supports LineageOS (14.1 and 15.1 version).

== Samsung Galaxy Ace 2 x / Trend ==
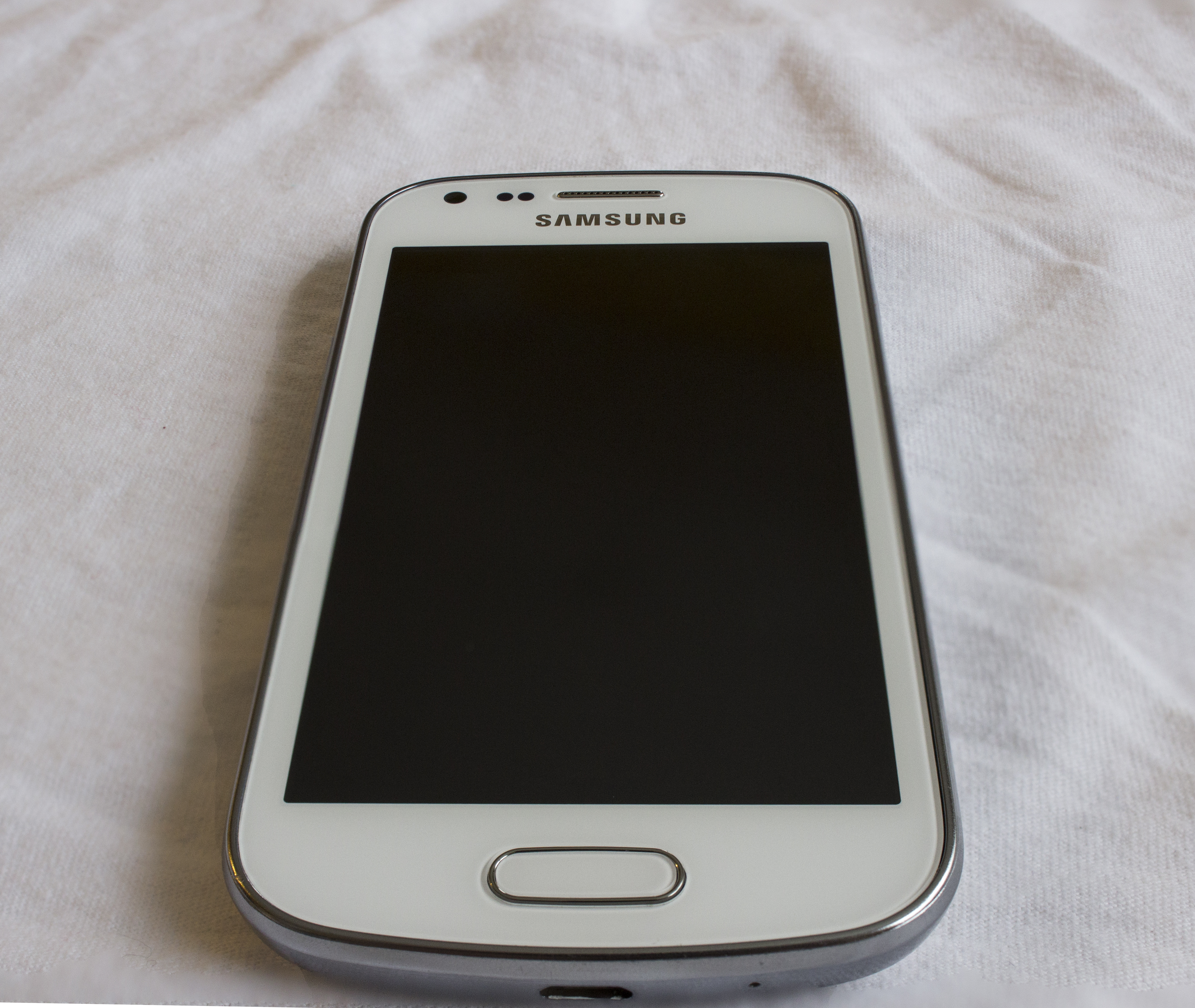
Samsung Galaxy Ace 2 x

Galaxy Ace 2x (GT-S7560M) and in some markets Galaxy Trend (GT-S7560) are at first glance variants of Galaxy Ace 2, in that both have a similar shell and specifications; such as the slightly larger 4" screen, and similar specs for RAM and storage space.

The major differentiator is in processing power: While Galaxy Ace 2 has a dual-core 800 MHz CPU, then Galaxy Ace II x and Galaxy Trend contain a single-core 1 GHz ARM Cortex-A5 processor in conjunction with an enhanced Adreno 200 GPU. The single-core Snapdragon S1 MSM7227A ARMv7 SoC design is much closer to the one in Samsung Galaxy Mini 2.

Galaxy Ace 2 x and Galaxy Trend have 645 MB of accessible RAM (out of the total 768 MB), and approximately 2 GB of user-accessible internal storage.

Galaxy S Duos (GT-S7562) is available with very similar specifications; the primary differentiating feature is its dual-SIM support.

Galaxy Trend Plus (GT-S7580) has very minor differences comparing with Galaxy Trend (GT-S7560). Trend Plus has Android 4.2 Jelly Bean out of the box, single-core 1.2 GHz processor in conjunction with VideoCore 4 GPU and Broadcom BCM21664 SoC.

Galaxy S Duos 2 (GT-S7582) is a dual-SIM equivalent of Galaxy Trend Plus.

=== Software ===
The devices are powered by Android 4.0.4 Ice Cream Sandwich, running Samsung's proprietary TouchWiz Nature UX as the default user interface.

Where possible, the operating systems can be upgraded to somewhat newer official versions of Android 4.x than the factory install, so now to perform a firmware upgrade, the phones must have at least 1 GB of free internal storage.

Since these phones run Android 4.0, they are still supported by cloud, communications and social networking services that push the latest versions of their apps, which have in some cases been designed with only the newest hardware in mind. Such applications hog system resources and cause the phones to run slowly. As a remedy, phone owners can replace those apps with less resource-hungry equivalents, or remove them entirely and use a web browser to access the services' sites.

The Facebook app has been singled out as the one that uses the most resources overall; it can demonstrably consume between 206-231 MB of RAM memory, whereas Metal (a Facebook wrapper) and Facebook Lite are much easier on phone RAM and battery life. Alternately, the Facebook mobile site can be used, as it uses browser notifications in browsers that support this functionality.

== See also ==
- Samsung Galaxy Ace
- Samsung Galaxy S Duos
- Samsung Galaxy S Duos 2
