= MyTouch =

Private label smartphone

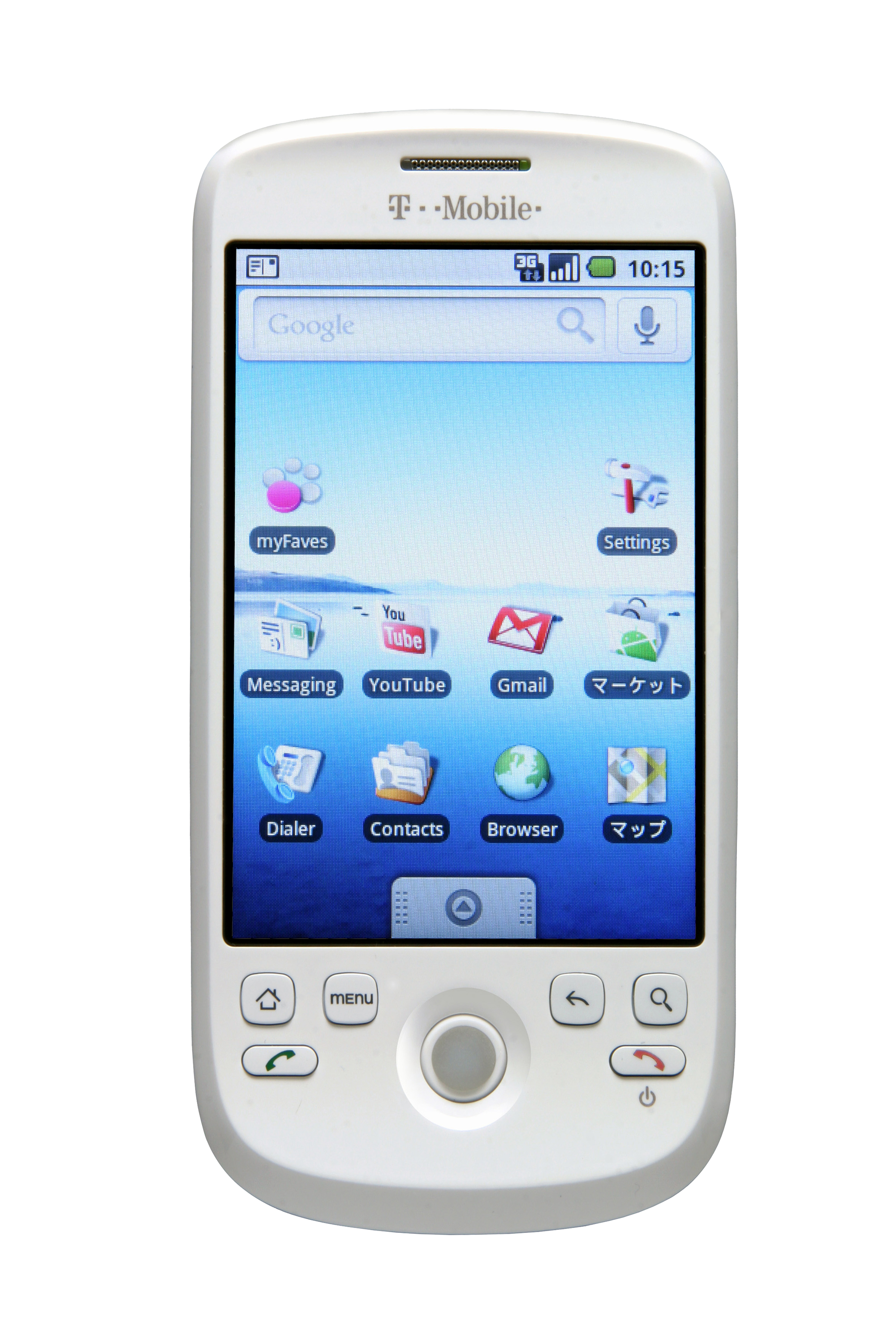
myTouch 3G

The T-Mobile myTouch or myTouch series is a product line of private label smartphones manufactured by HTC, LG and Huawei sold and marketed in the United States by T-Mobile USA under the T-Mobile brand. Each phone in the series runs a version of the Android software stack.

The T-Mobile myTouch 3G is a version of the HTC Magic, but the T-Mobile myTouch 3G Slide and the T-Mobile myTouch 4G are both unique to T-Mobile USA.

The myTouch series has thus far included simultaneous marketing of slider-keyboarded and keyless versions of otherwise similarly equipped models.

== Product models ==
Touchscreen-Keyboardless:	Slider-Keyboard:
* T-Mobile myTouch 3G (aka HTC Magic), (unveiled: February 17, 2009 & on sale via T-Mobile: 5 August 2009),	* T-Mobile myTouch 3G Slide, made by HTC (announced: May 4, 2010 & on sale June 2, 2010); CyanogenMod is available.
* T-Mobile myTouch 4G, manufactured by HTC, (Released: November 3, 2010); CyanogenMod is available.,	* T-Mobile myTouch 4G Slide, made by HTC (announced: July 11, 2011 & on sale July 26, 2011); Also known as HTC Doubleshot; Cyanogen Mod and related Virtuous Inquisition (Ice Cream Sandwich) now available
* T-Mobile myTouch by LG, {also referred to as the "E739"} (announced: 2011 & on sale 2011)	* T-Mobile myTouch Q, made by LG, {also referred to as the "C800"} (announced: 2011 & on sale 2011).
* T-Mobile myTouch by Huawei "U8680" ("Phoenix") (released 7/11/2012)	* T-Mobile myTouch Q by Huawei "U8730" ("Buddy") (released 7/11/2012); See also "External Links" section below.
