= Samsung Galaxy Ace 3 =

2013 Android smartphone

Samsung Galaxy Ace 3 GT-S7275R
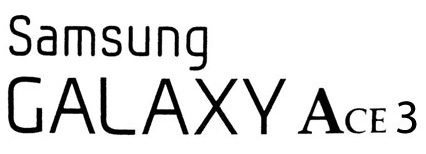

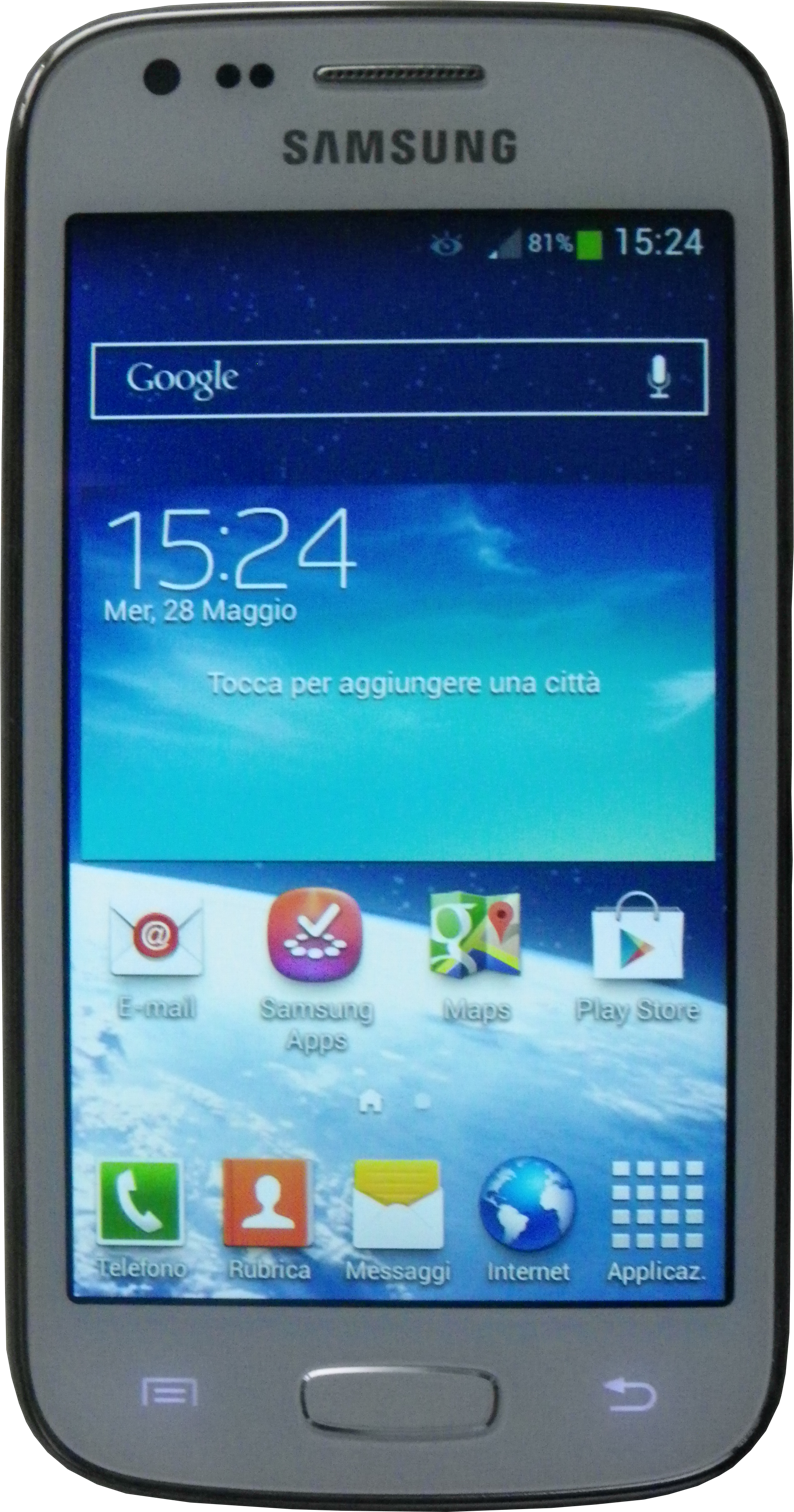
- Manufacturer: Samsung Electronics
- Type: Smartphone
- Series: Galaxy
- First released: 10 June 2013; 13 years ago
- Predecessor: Samsung Galaxy Ace 2
- Successor: Samsung Galaxy Ace 4
- Compatible networks: 3G 42/5.76 Mbps 850/900/2100 MHz; 4G LTE 150/50 Mbps 800/900/1800/2600MHz
- Form factor: Slate
- Dimensions: 121.2 mm (4.77 in) H 62.7 mm (2.47 in) W 10 mm (0.39 in) D
- Weight: 119.8 g (4.23 oz)
- Operating system: Android 4.2.2 "Jelly Bean" With TouchWiz; Unofficial: Android 8.1 "Oreo" via custom ROMs
- System-on-chip: Qualcomm Snapdragon MSM8930
- CPU: 1.2 GHz dual-core Qualcomm Krait
- GPU: Qualcomm Adreno 305
- Memory: 1 GB RAM
- Storage: 8 GB (4.5 GB available for user)
- Removable storage: microSD up to 64 GB
- Battery: 1,800 mAh, 3.7 V, internal rechargeable Li-ion, user replaceable
- Rear camera: 5 Mpx 2592×1944 max, autofocus, LED flash, HD video recording 1280×720 px MPEG4 at 30 FPS
- Front camera: Yes, VGA
- Display: 4.0 in (100 mm) TFT LCD diagonal. 480×800 px WVGA; 16M colors
- Connectivity: 3.5 mm jack Bluetooth v4.0 with A2DP & AVRCP; DLNA; Stereo FM radio with RDS; Micro-USB 2.0; Near field communication (NFC); Wi-Fi 802.11 b/g/n
- Data inputs: Multi-touch, capacitive touchscreen Accelerometer; A-GPS; GLONASS; Digital compass Proximity sensor Push buttons Capacitive touch-sensitive buttons
- SAR: 0.582 w/kg(head)
- Other: Swype keyboard, Google Play, Polaris™ Office, ChatON, Social Hub, Readers Hub and Game Hub

Galaxy Ace 3 GT-S7270
- Manufacturer: Samsung Electronics
- Type: Smartphone
- Series: Galaxy
- First released: June 10, 2013; 13 years ago
- Predecessor: Samsung Galaxy Ace 2
- Successor: Samsung Galaxy Ace 4
- Compatible networks: 3G 850/900/1800/1900 MHz; 3.5G HSPA 14.4 Mbps (DL)/5.76 (UL) Mbps 900/2100 MHz; (Canada HSPA 850/1900 MHz)
- Form factor: Slate
- Dimensions: 121.2 mm (4.77 in) H 62.7 mm (2.47 in) W 9.8 mm (0.39 in) D
- Weight: 115 g (4.1 oz)
- Operating system: Original: Android 4.2.2 "Jelly Bean"; Unofficial: Android 8.1 "Oreo" via custom ROMs
- System-on-chip: Broadcomm BCM21664
- CPU: 1 GHz dual-core ARM Cortex-A9
- GPU: Broadcomm VideoCore IV
- Memory: 1 GB RAM
- Storage: 8 GB (4.5 GB available for user)
- Removable storage: microSD up to 64 GB
- Battery: 1,500 mAh, 5.0 Wh, 3.7 V, internal rechargeable Li-ion, user replaceable
- Rear camera: 5 Mpx 2592×1944 max, autofocus, LED flash, HD video recording 1280×720 px MPEG4 at 30 FPS
- Front camera: Yes, VGA
- Display: 4.0 in (100 mm) TFT LCD diagonal. 480×800 px WVGA; 16M colors
- Connectivity: 3.5 mm jack Bluetooth v3.0 with A2DP; DLNA; Stereo FM radio with RDS; Micro-USB 2.0; Wi-Fi 802.11 b/g/n
- Data inputs: Multi-touch, capacitive touchscreen Accelerometer; A-GPS; GLONASS; Digital compass Proximity sensor Push buttons Capacitive touch-sensitive buttons
- SAR: 0.469 w/kg(head)
- Other: Swype keyboard, Google Play, Polaris™ Office, ChatON, Social Hub, Readers Hub and Game Hub

The Samsung Galaxy Ace 3 (GT-S7270/GT-S7272/GT-S7275R) is a smartphone manufactured by Samsung that runs the Android operating system. Announced and released by Samsung in June 2013, the Galaxy Ace 3 is the successor to the Galaxy Ace 2.

The Galaxy Ace 3 is a dual-core Android-based device, sold as an upper mid-range smartphone; the LTE model features a Qualcomm Snapdragon MSM8930 SoC, whereas the 3G model features a Broadcomm BCM21664 SoC with a 1 GHz dual-core ARM Cortex-A9 CPU and a Broadcomm VideoCore IV GPU.

== Features ==
The Galaxy Ace 3 is a 3.5G and 4G smartphone, with quad band GSM and announced with two-band HSDPA (900/2100)MHz at 14.4(DL)/5.76(UL) Mbit/s. It sports a display of a 4.0 inch PLS TFT LCD capacitive touchscreen with 16M colours WVGA (480x800) resolution. It has a 5-megapixel camera with LED flash and auto focus, capable of recording videos at QVGA (320x240), VGA (640x480) and HD (1280x720) pixels resolution with a VGA front-facing camera. The Galaxy Ace 3 comes with a 1500 mAh (3G) and an 1800 mAh (LTE) Li-ion battery.

The Galaxy Ace 3 has social network integration abilities and multimedia features. It is also preloaded with basic Google Apps such as Google+ and Google Messenger (later renamed Google Messages). The Galaxy Ace 3 is available in metallic black, white and wine red.

== Successor ==
In August 2014, Samsung released a successor to the Galaxy Ace 3; Samsung Galaxy Ace 4.

== See also ==
- Samsung Galaxy Ace
