= Samsung Galaxy Core Prime =

2015 Android smartphone

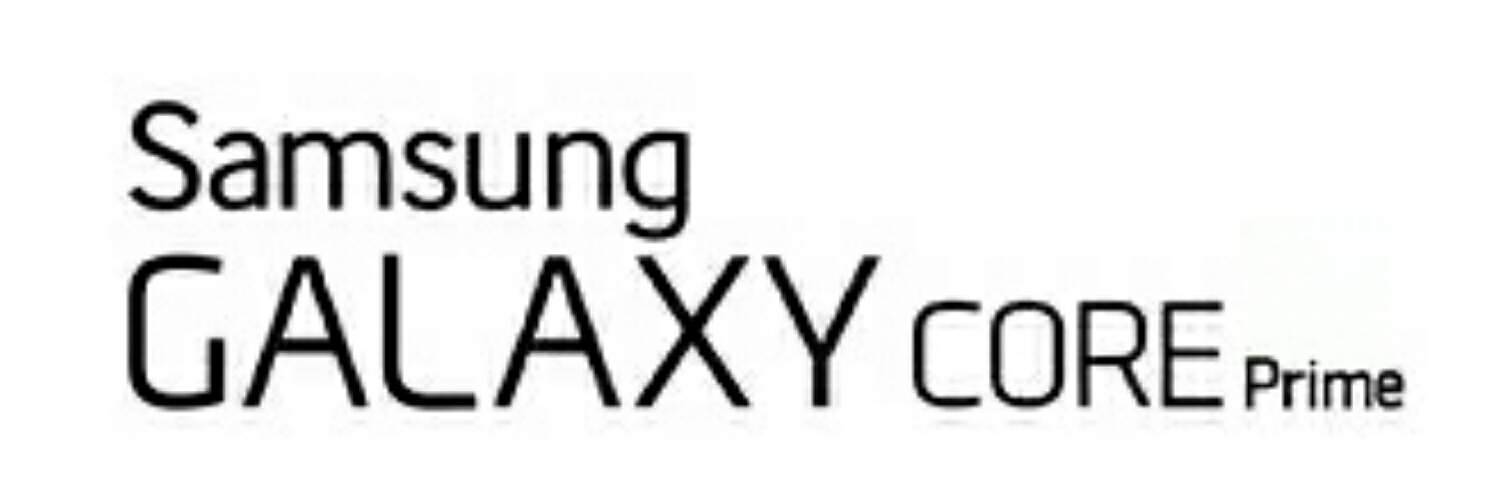

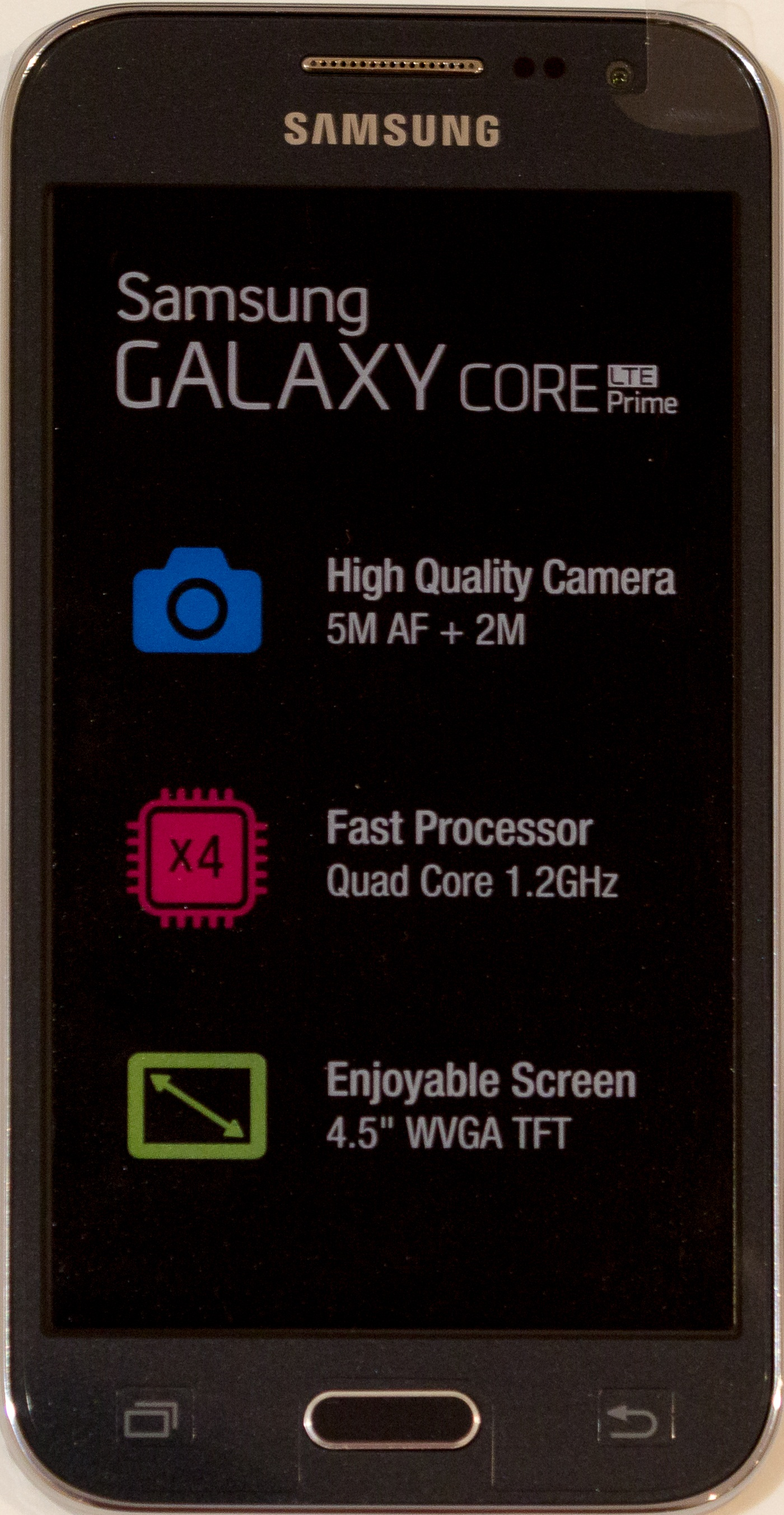
- Samsung Galaxy Core Prime on display
- Brand: Samsung Galaxy
- Manufacturer: Samsung Electronics
- Type: Touchscreen smartphone
- Series: Samsung Galaxy Core
- First released: November 2014; 11 years ago 2015; 11 years ago (Value Edition)
- Predecessor: Samsung Galaxy Core 2
- Successor: Samsung Galaxy J1; Samsung Galaxy J2
- Compatible networks: (GSM/GPRS/EDGE): 850, 900, 1800, and 1900 MHz; 3G (HSPA 42.2/5.76 Mbit/s): HSDPA 850, 900, 1900, and 2100 MHz; 4G LTE (Cat4 150/50 Mbit/s): 700, 800, 850, 900, 1700, 1800, 1900, 2100, and 2600 MHz
- Dimensions: 130.8 mm (5.15 in) H 67.9 mm (2.67 in) W 8.8 mm (0.35 in) D
- Weight: 130 g (4.6 oz)
- Operating system: Android 4.4.4 KitKat upgradable to Android Lollipop 5.0.2 or 5.1.1
- System-on-chip: Qualcomm Snapdragon MSM8916 410; Spreadtrum SC8830 (SM-G360H)
- CPU: ARM-A7 1.2 GHz quad-core CPU (SM-G360H)
- GPU: Adreno 306; Mali-400MP (SM-360H)
- Memory: 1 GB RAM
- Storage: 8 GB
- Removable storage: microSD, microSDXC up to 128 GB
- Battery: 2000 mAh Li-ion
- Rear camera: 5 Megapixel with LED flash
- Front camera: 2 Megapixel
- Display: 4.5 in (110 mm) 480×800 px (207 dpi)
- Data inputs: Accelerometer; Proximity sensor
- Model: SM-G360H SM-G360T1 SM-G360V
- Website: Official Website

The Samsung Galaxy Core Prime (also known as the Galaxy Prevail LTE on Boost Mobile) is an Android-based smartphone designed, developed, and marketed by Samsung Electronics. The Galaxy Core Prime features a 4.5 in (110 mm) WVGA display, 4G LTE connectivity and Android Kitkat 4.4.4. Some variants can be upgraded to Lollipop 5.0.2 OS or Lollipop 5.1.1. The 4G version of Samsung Galaxy Core Prime (SM-360FY/DS) was launched on 2 June 2015.

== Variants ==
In Brazil, Core Prime is marketed under the name Win 2, a model optionally with DTV tuner.

The Samsung Galaxy Core Prime Value Edition was released in 2015 with a Marvell PXA1908.

== Specifications ==
- Single or Dual SIM
- 4.5-inch 480 × 800 TFT display with 207 dpi (xdpi: 197, ydpi: 192)
- Ships with Android OS version 4.4.4 KitKat. Available to update to Lollipop OS 5.0.2 or 5.1.1 operating system with "TouchWiz Home" Home screen UI
- Quad-core 1.2 GHz Cortex-A53 processor
- Adreno 306/Mali 400MP GPU
- 1 GB of RAM
- Snapdragon 410 chipset/Spreadtrum SC8830
- 8 GB built-in storage, microSD card slot (up to 128 GB)
- 5-megapixel camera with LED flash, 720p video recording, 2-megapixel front-facing camera
- Cat. 4 LTE (150/50 Mbit/s); Wi-Fi b/g/n; Bluetooth 4.0; NFC; GPS; microUSB, FM radio
- 2,000 mAh battery

== Reception ==
PCMag noted the compactness of the phone. TechRadar did not consider it a good contender at the low-end spectrum of the market.

== Controversy ==
A Galaxy Core Prime has exploded while a male child was holding it. He was rushed to the hospital after calling 911, and after recovering, suffered from technophobia. This generated some confusion because it was assumed it was a Galaxy Note 7, infamous for exploding.

== See also ==
- Samsung Galaxy Core
- Samsung Galaxy Star 2 Plus
