= T-Mobile myTouch 3G Slide =

Smartphone model

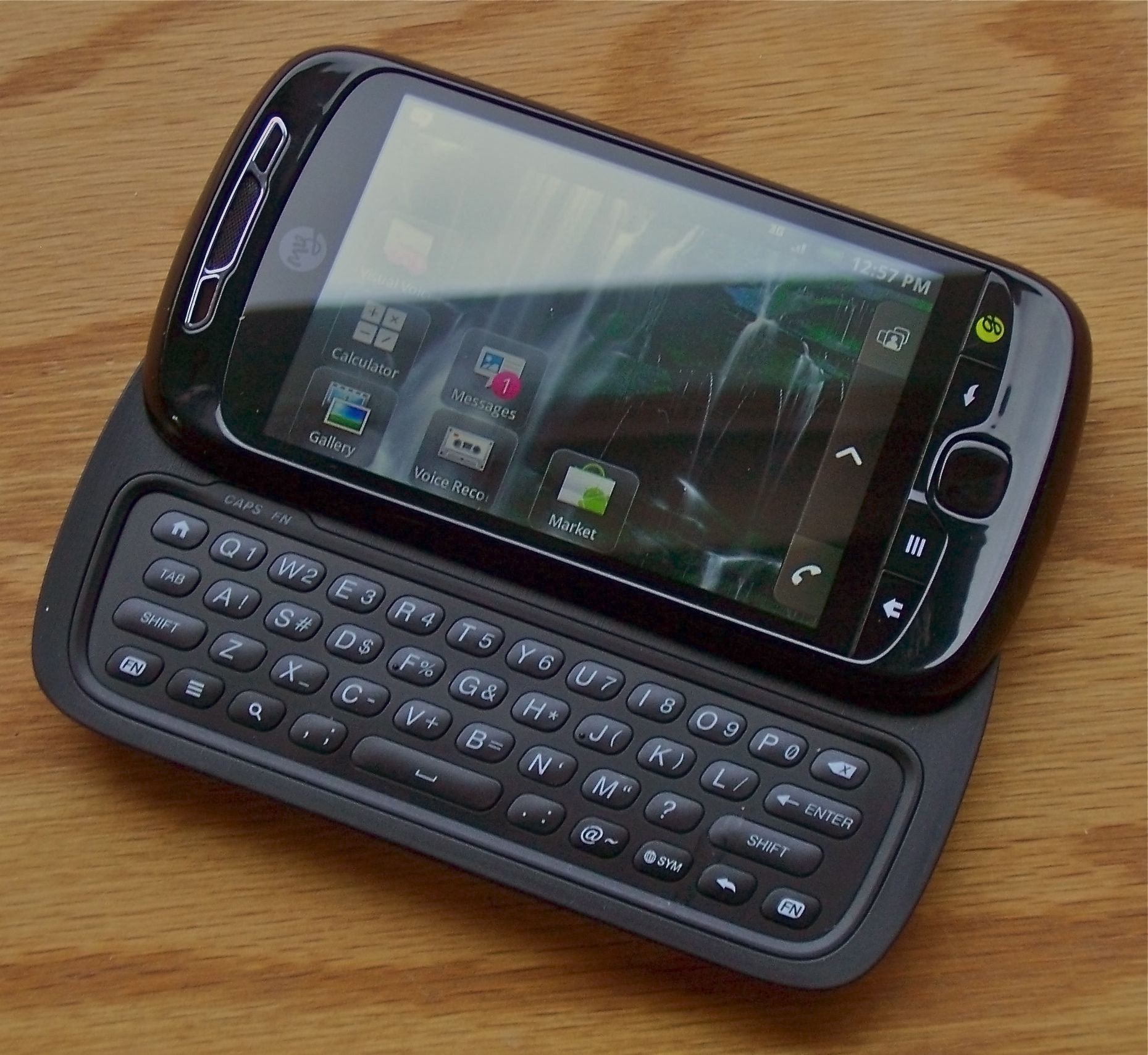
- Manufacturer: HTC Corporation
- Type: Smartphone
- Series: myTouch; A Series
- First released: United States June 2, 2010; 16 years ago (T-Mobile USA)
- Predecessor: T-Mobile myTouch 3G
- Successor: T-Mobile myTouch 4G
- Form factor: Slider
- Dimensions: 115.6 mm (4.55 in) (h); 60.2 mm (2.37 in) (w); 15.2 mm (0.60 in) (d)
- Weight: 164.4 g (5.80 oz)
- Operating system: Android 2.2.1 Froyo Released with Android 2.1 Eclair
- CPU: 600 MHz Qualcomm MSM7227 ARM11 processor
- Memory: 512 MB RAM; 512 MB ROM
- Storage: Flash memory: 512 MB microSD slot: 32 GB
- Battery: 1300 mAh; Internal rechargeable removable lithium-ion battery
- Rear camera: 5.0 megapixel with auto focus and LED flash
- Display: 320 x 480 px, 3.4 in (86 mm), HVGA @ 170 ppi
- Connectivity: Wi-Fi (802.11b/g), Bluetooth 2.1+EDR, MicroUSB, A-GPS; Quad band GSM 850 900 1800 1900 MHz GPRS/EDGE; Tri band UMTS 900 1700 2100 MHz HSDPA/HSUPA (US/Europe) (7.2/2 Mbit/s)
- Data inputs: Multi-touch capacitive touchscreen display, volume controls, proximity and ambient light sensors, 3-axis accelerometer, physical keyboard
- Hearing aid compatibility: M4

The T-Mobile myTouch 3G Slide is a smartphone designed and manufactured by HTC, and sold by T-Mobile USA. HTC's name for the device during development was Espresso. The T-Mobile myTouch 3G Slide was unveiled by T-Mobile USA on May 4, 2010, pre-orders began May 23, 2010 and the device went on sale June 2, 2010.

== Software ==
The 3G Slide was released running Android 2.1. It was announced that the device will be upgradable to version 2.2 ("Froyo"), which will include WiFi sharing and WiFi calls, as well as other features. In early April 2011, HTC released the Android OS 2.2.1 ("Froyo") update file. This update was made in a downloadable client for Windows users only. This new update will include optimizations and native support for the new Adobe Flash Player 10.1. However, the full player will only be available on processors of ARMv7 design and newer. Other new features include myModes, a profile-management feature that can also integrate with location and time info. The device also runs a customized version of HTC Sense called "HTC Sense: Expresso" created by T-Mobile.

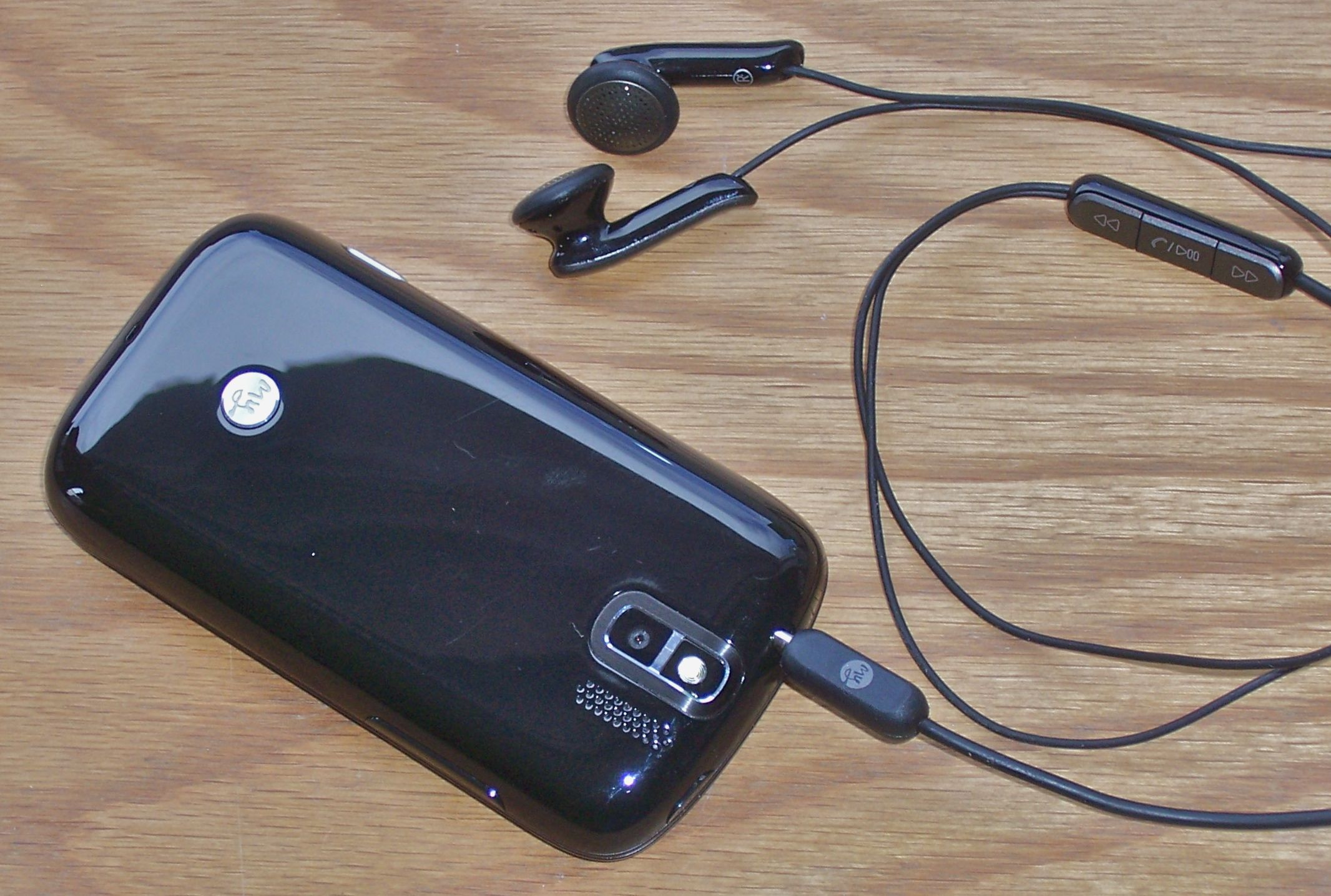
myTouch Slide 3G back view with headphones

=== Genius button ===
"Genius" is a custom voice command and text-to-speech system powered by Dragon Dictation technologies. The button replaces, and is in the location of, the search button previously on the myTouch 3G.

== Hardware ==
The myTouch 3G Slide features a 3.4 inch, 320x480 pixel HVGA-resolution TFT capacitive multi-touch enabled LCD screen. The device is built around a 600 MHz Qualcomm MSM7227 processor which incorporates a built-in GPU. Features include a new optical trackpad which replaces the physical trackball found on the older 3G; a 5-megapixel low-light camera with LED flash; built-in GPS with A-GPS support; Bluetooth 2.1 with A2DP and AVRCP support; Wi-Fi 802.11 b/g; a three-axis accelerometer; proximity sensor; 3.5mm standard headphone jack; and a microSD slot, preloaded with an 8 GB microSDHC card. Input is accomplished using a sliding physical 4-row QWERTY keyboard, or HTC Sense and Swype varieties of virtual on-screen keyboards. Powering the device is one standard 1300mAh lithium ion battery.

=== Cellular hardware ===
The T-Mobile model supports AWS (band IV) and IMT (band I), so it is compatible with the 3G networks of T-Mobile, Mobilicity and Wind Mobile, and some carriers in Europe and Asia. A "world" version has not yet been announced.

== Availability ==
The smartphone went on sale on June 2, 2010 in the colors White, Red ("Merlot"), and Black. Pre-orders began on May 23, 2010 in the United States through T-Mobile's website and various other retail stores. The phone had a minor release date on June 2 but an official release date was set to June 16, 2010. The 3G Slide retails at $179 in T-Mobile brick and mortar or online store with a new/extended contract. The phone is also available at $89 through some distributors with a new/extended contract.

== See also ==
- Android OS
- T-Mobile myTouch 3G
- T-Mobile myTouch 4G
- Galaxy Nexus
