= Samsung E1170 =

Mobile phone model

- Manufacturer: Samsung
- Availability by region: To buy
- Successor: Samsung Galaxy Ace
- Compatible networks: 2G Network, GSM 900 / GSM 1800
- Battery: Li-ion 1000 mAh
- Display: 128 x 128 pixels

The Samsung E1170 is a mobile phone made by Samsung, released in 2010. It was designed for lower budget markets, and is similar to the Samsung E1107. The E1170T model is the same as the E1170, but has slight cosmetic changes (such as the 'supper man' nav button)

The E1170 was succeeded by the Samsung Galaxy Ace, which was announced in February 2011.

== Features ==
- Browser
- Clock, Alarm, Calendar, Organizer
- Calculator, Converter
- T9 predictive text
- Hands-free operation, Vibration
- 'Jewel Quest' Game
- Phone tracker
- Fake call
- SOS messages
- Torch light
- Stopwatch, Timer
- Profiles
- Wallpapers, Themes
- Power saving mode
