= Carly Foulkes =

Canadian model and television commercial actress

Carly Marie Foulkes
- Born: Toronto, Ontario, Canada
- Occupations: Model, television commercial actress
- Modeling information
- Height: 5 ft 9 in (1.75 m)
- Hair color: Brown
- Eye color: Brown
- Agency: Modelwerk, Sutherland Models

Carly Marie Foulkes is a Canadian model and actress who became known for appearing in a series of T-Mobile myTouch 4G television commercials, in which she often wore pink/magenta-and-white summer dresses. She continued as spokesperson in other T-Mobile ads in which she was depicted as a pink-and-black leather-clad biker girl. She served as the T-Mobile spokesperson primarily from fall 2010 until spring 2013, with occasional appearances since then.

== Career ==
=== Modeling ===
In 2001, at age 13, Foulkes began modeling in the Toronto area. After high school, she moved to New York City to model for agents. Subsequently, she found modeling work in Singapore and Europe. After returning to New York to model, she began to pursue acting.

Foulkes appeared on the April 2009 cover of Mexican Elle magazine and in advertisements for Rugby Ralph Lauren, Abercrombie & Fitch, Macy's, and Tommy Hilfiger. She is represented by Modelwerk and Sutherland Models.

As of early 2011, a Los Angeles Times writer described her look as Anne Hathaway meets Kim Basinger, noting that she was still often confused with fellow Canadian Jessica Paré.

=== T-Mobile television ads ===
Foulkes became the T-Mobile 4G spokesperson in fall 2010, despite not using the usual American English pronunciation of "mobile" (MOH-b'l) in her summer 2009 audition, but rather pronouncing the word as rhyming with "smile", an accepted pronunciation more common in Canadian English. Her advertising campaign was at first noted for similarities to the 2006–2010 Justin Long/John Hodgman "Get a Mac" ads. Foulkes derides the iPhone 4 and its exclusive provider at the time, AT&T, the same way the Apple Inc. derided Windows-based personal computers. As a T-Mobile spokesperson, her most immediate predecessor was Catherine Zeta-Jones. Her T-Mobile USA ads ran on major United States networks and multiple web sites.

Although Foulkes was originally only expected to perform in two or three commercials, as of December 2011, she has produced a dozen commercials with more anticipated.

Foulkes has been described as a "picture-perfect brunette". Since becoming the T-Mobile girl, she is known for the pink summer dresses that she wears in most of the ads. She has been styled by Debra LeClair, a stylist at T-Mobile. In August 2011, Sprint Nextel's Virgin Mobile prepaid service referred to T-Mobile and Foulkes with caricature ads featuring a brunette in a pink dress. Two months earlier, Cricket Wireless used negative attack marketing against T-Mobile without referring to Foulkes. Although dresses in the earlier commercials were frequently described as pink, more recent commercials are noted for the use of magenta dresses. T-mobile has a color trademark for the color magenta and markets itself using its corporate colors.

One of her more notable commercials was a 2011 holiday season production. On November 30, 2011, T-mobile announced a surprise event at the Woodfield Mall. On December 1, 2011, veteran Glee director Alfonso Gomez-Rejon directed about six surprise singing and dancing mall performances of "Home for the Holidays" by Foulkes and 100 Chicago-area women in magenta dresses. The performances were later edited into a music video with the hope that it would go viral. The full video was posted on YouTube with a run time of 3:48, and it was presented in a 60-second national television commercial starting on December 12, 2011. The video was produced by Ridley and Tony Scott's RSA Films. The musical director was Paul Mirkovich.

On April 17, 2012, T-Mobile launched a rebranded ad campaign that included broadcast and cable TV, Hulu, YouTube, and mobile, as well as print. In the refreshed ad campaign Foulkes starred in a commercial, entitled "Alter Ego", in which she discards her usual pink dresses and high heels for a black-and-pink biker outfit and boots before embarking on a motorcycle ride. The commercials are perceived as a departure from previous female-friendly Foulkes ads. The commercial was planned to run until Fall 2012, when the complete relaunch of the T-Mobile ad campaign was to have been scheduled. In announcing the ad to the media, T-Mobile said:

With this new ad, there is a distinctive departure from our existing campaign as Carly's magenta summer dresses are replaced by motorcycle leathers and a 1000 cc Ducati superbike, which symbolizes the speed and capabilities of our 4G network. Entitled 'Alter Ego', the ad is a metaphor for what T-Mobile is all about – challenging the status quo and taking bold steps in the marketplace as a challenger brand.

She has also been a popular sex symbol since the ads started. After months of email support, Foulkes was included in the SI.com feature "Hot Clicks" on May 18, 2011. During a rash of servicemen's online request of celebrities as escorts to military balls, Airman Adam Stelmack asked Foulkes to the Air Force Ball on Guam, and she declined by posting a video.

In March 2013, Foulkes was described as "one of the most recognizable brand spokespeople" by Business Insider journalist Laura Stampler even after converting from a pink dress wardrobe to a bad girl/biker chick image. Later that spring, when T-Mobile prepared for its April rollout of the iPhone 5, it selected an advertising campaign without Foulkes, ending her two and a half-year tenure as spokesperson. Foulkes' last new commercial was posted to YouTube on February 25, 2013. The new ad campaign featured Cowboys. T-Mobile debuted its new ad campaign on March 26, 2013, without Foulkes. The company has said that the 'T-Mobile Girl' character has been sidelined for now, but this is believed to be a permanent advertising change. An official T-Mobile statement said: "This campaign represents a new direction for the brand -- offering consumers a simple choice. As such, the current campaign will not feature the character of the T-Mobile Girl, but she is still a part of the company's brand family."

In early July 2013, Foulkes returned to participate in T-Mobile press events. At the same time, she tweeted a six-second Vine video hinting that she would be returning to the ad campaign. In September, Foulkes appeared in a T-Mobile public service announcement regarding texting and driving. On October 10, 2013, T-Mobile announced that they had signed a multi-year contract with Shakira as a corporate spokesperson. Foulkes would not be part of the campaign, but remained under contract with T-Mobile and vaguely remained in the future plans.

== Personal life ==
Foulkes's parents are British, although she was raised in Toronto and attended Loretto Abbey. She has two sisters, Kimmy and Angie. She spent summers in England while growing up.

Foulkes is a video game junkie. She also describes herself as adept at skateboarding. Despite the association with pink dresses due to the T-Mobile ad campaign, Foulkes claims not to wear pink in her personal wardrobe, describing herself in high school as "a little punk-music kid" wearing black leather.

When asked about her status as an Internet sex symbol, Foulkes said she does not classify herself as such: "I'm flattered, but it's funny."
