= Samsung Galaxy Core 2 =

Smartphone model manufactured by Samsung

Samsung Galaxy Core II
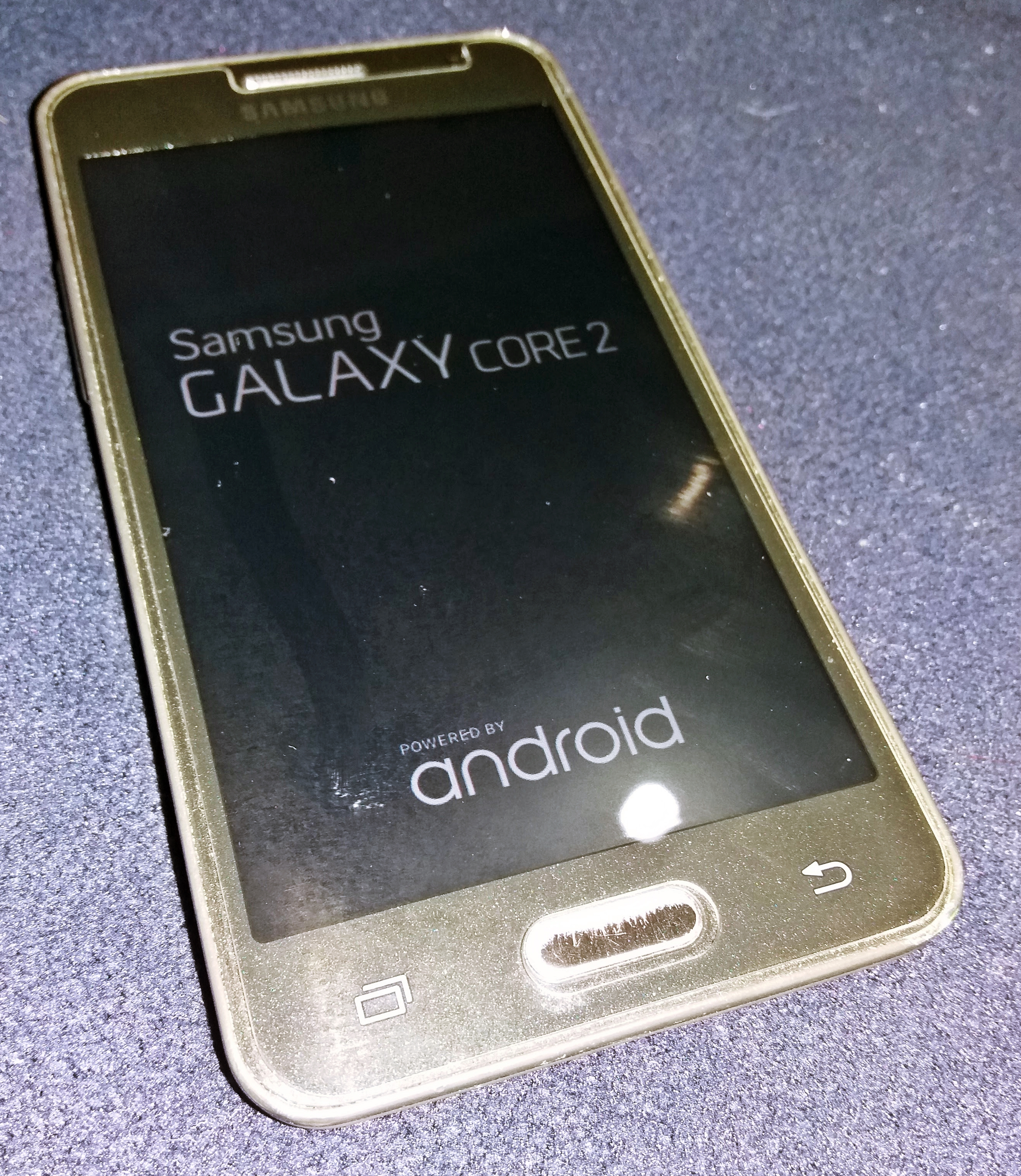
- Brand: Samsung Galaxy
- Manufacturer: Samsung Electronics
- Type: Touchscreen smartphone
- First released: June 2014
- Predecessor: Samsung Galaxy Core
- Successor: Samsung Galaxy Core Prime
- Form factor: Slate
- Dimensions: 130.3 mm (5.13 in) H 68 mm (2.7 in) W 9.8 mm (0.39 in) D
- Weight: 138 g (4.9 oz)
- Operating system: Android 4.4.2 KitKat
- CPU: 1.2 GHz Spreadtrum SC8830, ARMv7 quad core
- GPU: ARM Mali-400 MP2
- Memory: 768 MB RAM
- Storage: 4 GB
- Removable storage: MicroSD up to 64 GB
- Battery: 2000 mAh Li-ion battery
- Rear camera: 5 MP
- Front camera: 0.3 MP
- Display: 4.5 inches, 480 x 800 pixels (207 ppi) TFT LCD capacitive touchscreen, 256K colors
- Connectivity: USB 2.0, Bluetooth, Wi-Fi, Wi-Fi Direct, GPS location
- Development status: Discontinued
- Website: Official website

The Samsung Galaxy Core 2 is a smartphone manufactured by Samsung Electronics. It was first unveiled by Samsung in July 2014 on the official website and was released the following month. It is the successor to the Samsung Galaxy Core. It runs on Android 4.4.2 KitKat. It has a 4.5 inch capacitive touchscreen with WVGA (480x800) resolution, with a pixel density of 207 ppi. It has a quad-core processor clocked at 1.2 GHz. It has 768 MB of RAM. The Galaxy Core 2 has 4 GB of internal storage and supports MicroSD cards up to 64 GB.

It has a 5 MP primary camera with autofocus and an LED flash. It has a 0.3 MP (VGA) front facing camera. It can record 480p video at 30fps. Other features include touch to focus, continuous shot, and geo tagging.

The device features an accelerometer intended to translate natural gestures into commands.

It has a 2000 mAh Li-ion battery with a talk time of up to 7 hours and music playback of up to 30 hours.

== See also ==
- Samsung Galaxy Core
- Samsung Galaxy Core Prime
