= Samsung E1120 =

Mobile phone model

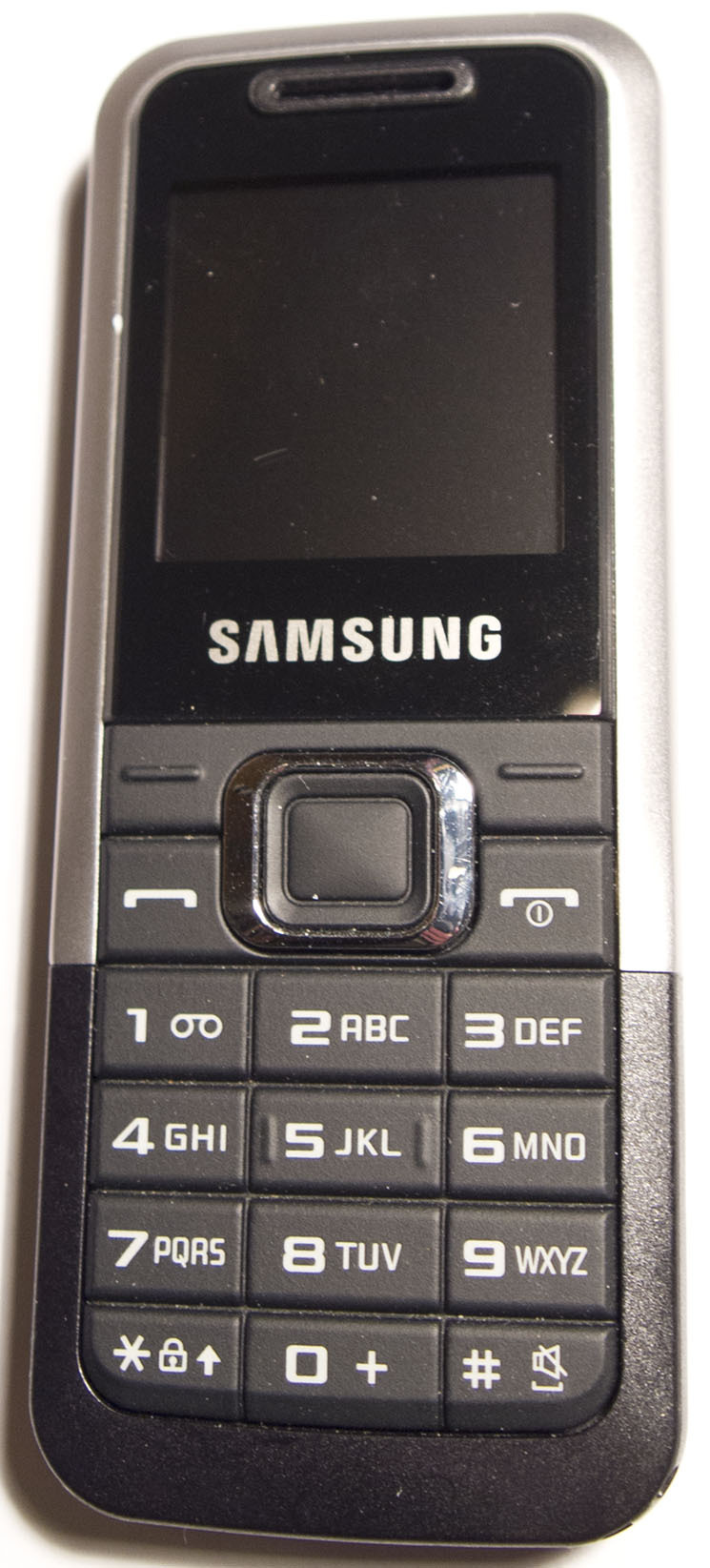
- Manufacturer: Samsung
- Availability by region: Available
- Successor: Samsung Galaxy Ace
- Compatible networks: 2G Network, GSM 900 / GSM 1800
- Dimensions: 106 x 43 x 15
- Weight: 67 g (2 oz)
- Battery: Li-ion
- Display: 128 x 128 pixels

The Samsung E1120 is a mobile phone made by Samsung, released in 2009. It is designed for lower budget markets, and is a small, light, basic and simple phone. It was discontinued by Samsung in 2011 when the Galaxy Ace was released as its successor.

== Features ==
- Clock, Alarm, Calendar, Organizer
- Calculator, Converter
- T9 predictive text
- Hands-free operation, Vibration
- 1 Game (Sudoku)
- Phone tracker
- SOS messages
- Torch light
- Stopwatch, Timer
- Profiles
- Wallpapers, Themes
- Power saving mode
- uTrack
