= Dragon Dictation =

Speech recognition application

Dragon Dictation started as speech recognition application for Apple's iOS platforms, including iPhone, iPod Touch and iPad. The app provided automatic speech-to-text capabilities. It was developed by Nuance Communications, and released in December 2009 as a free app. It is now commonly found licensed in vehicle infotainment systems and healthcare equipment.

Dragon Dictation speech recognition is based on Dragon NaturallySpeaking speech recognition technology from Nuance Communications. It works online, requiring an Internet connection by the user. Other apps which used the same speech recognition technology include Siri, which Apple acquired in 2010 and is now integrated into iOS.

In July 2010, Nuance reported that there had been 3.7 million downloads of their iPhone apps, and Dragon Dictation ranked as the number one business productivity app in Apple's iTunes App Store.

Eventually, the software became available for devices running the Android operating system through other Nuance apps like the Swype Keyboard and the Dragon Mobile Assistant. However, in February 2018, Nuance announced a focus on the enterprise market which resulted in them discontinuing these apps.
