= Samsung Galaxy Ace =

Android smartphone by Samsung

Samsung Galaxy Ace GT-S5830 GT-S5830i GT-S5838 GT-S5839i

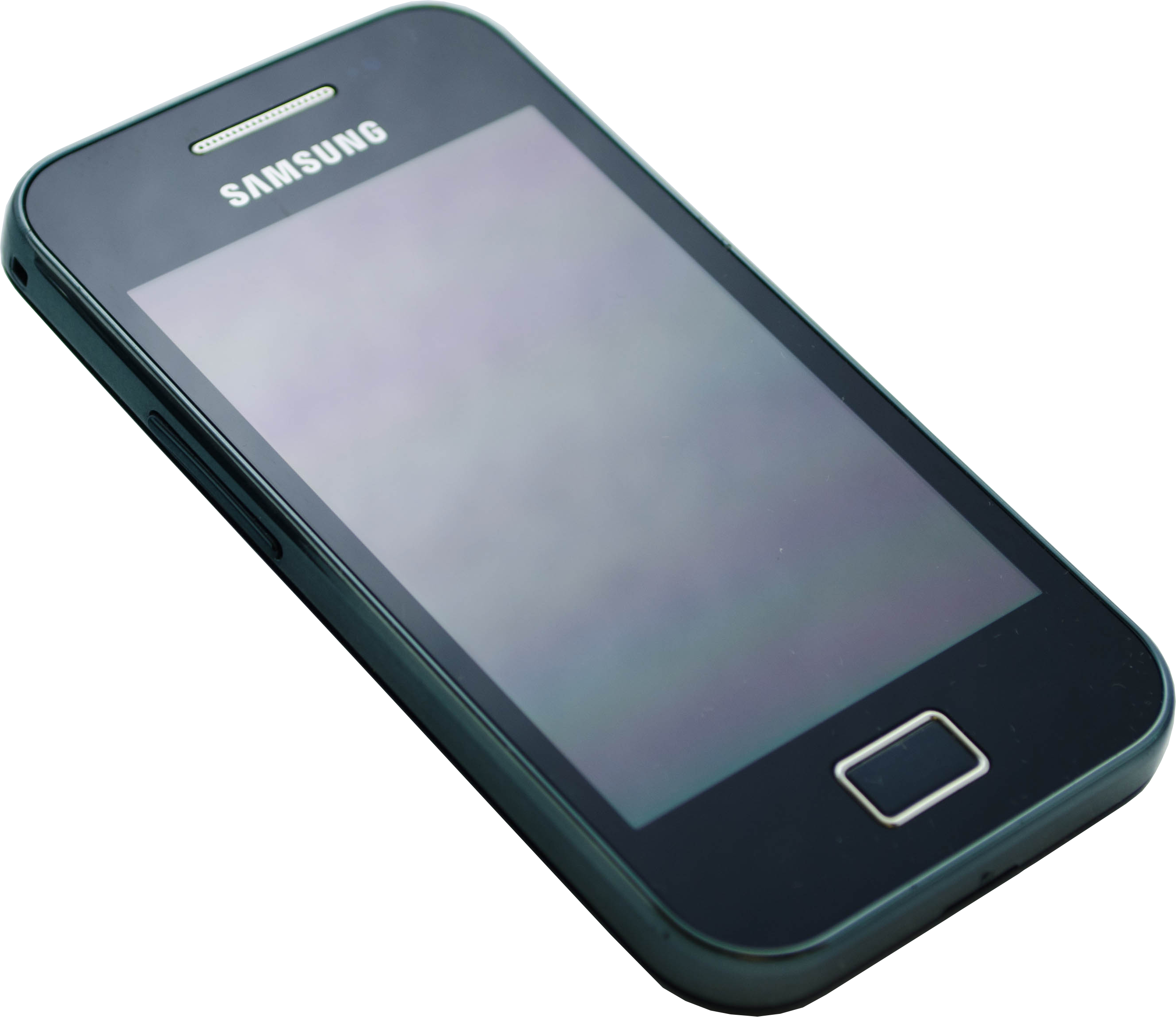
- Brand: Samsung
- Manufacturer: Samsung Electronics
- Type: Smartphone
- Series: Galaxy
- First released: UK 1 February 2011; 15 years ago
- Predecessor: Samsung E1120; Samsung E1170; Samsung Galaxy 3
- Successor: Samsung Galaxy Ace Plus; Samsung Galaxy Ace 2
- Related: Samsung Galaxy Mini; Samsung Galaxy Gio
- Compatible networks: 3G 850/900/1800/1900 MHz; 3.5G HSDPA 7.2 Mbps 900/2100 MHz (Canada HSDPA 850/1900 MHz); TD-SCDMA (China Mobile Variant)
- Form factor: Slate
- Dimensions: 112.4 mm (4.43 in) H 59.9 mm (2.36 in) W 11.5 mm (0.45 in) D
- Weight: 113 g (4.0 oz)
- Operating system: Original: Android 2.2.1 "Froyo" Current: Android 2.3.6 "Gingerbread" with TouchWiz Unofficial: Android 4.4.4 "KitKat" via CyanogenMod 11
- CPU: 800 MHz Qualcomm MSM7227-1 Turbo, ARMv6 (GT-S5830); 832 MHz Broadcom BCM21553 ARMv6 processor (GT-S5830i)
- GPU: Adreno 200 GPU (GT-S5830); Broadcom BCM2763 VideoCore IV GPU (GT-S5830i)
- Memory: 384MB RAM (accessible: 278MB)
- Storage: 512MB (accessible: 158 MB)
- Removable storage: microSD up to 32 GB
- Battery: 1,350 mAh, 5.0 Wh, 3.7 V, internal rechargeable Li-ion, user replaceable
- Rear camera: 5-Mpx 2560×1920 max, 2x digital zoom, autofocus, LED flash, VGA video recording 640×480 pixels MPEG4 at 24 FPS
- Front camera: No
- Display: TFT LCD, 3.5 in (89 mm) diagonal. 320×480 pixels HVGA (165 ppi) with Gorilla Glass; 16M colors
- Connectivity: 3.5 mm jack Bluetooth v2.1 (v3 in S5830i & S6802) with A2DP; DLNA; Stereo FM radio with RDS; Micro-USB 2.0; Wi-Fi 802.11 b/g/n
- Data inputs: Multi-touch, capacitive touchscreen Accelerometer; A-GPS; Digital compass Proximity sensor Push buttons Capacitive touch-sensitive buttons
- SAR: 0.84 W/kg
- Other: Gorilla glass display, Swype keyboard

The Samsung Galaxy Ace (also known as Samsung Galaxy Cooper in some territories) is a smartphone manufactured by Samsung that runs the open-source Android operating system. Announced by Samsung on 23 January 2011, released in February 2011. the Galaxy Ace features an 800 MHz Qualcomm MSM7227 processor with the Adreno 200 GPU. It is available in black, with back covers in three different colors: black, purple and white.

In January 2012, Samsung announced its successor, the Galaxy Ace Plus, and have since released as successor models the Galaxy Ace 2 in May 2012, the Galaxy Ace 3 in July 2013, and the Galaxy Ace 4 in August 2014.

The Galaxy Ace is a 3G smartphone, offering quad-band GSM and announced with two-band HSDPA (900/2100) at 7.2 Mbit/s. The display is a 3.5 inch TFT LCD capacitive touchscreen with its protection by a Gorilla Glass and has HVGA (320x480) resolution. There is also a 5-megapixel camera with LED flash, capable of recording videos at QVGA (320x240) resolution and VGA (640x480) resolution with the Gingerbread update, and a 1350 mAh Li-ion battery.

Android firmware for S5830i can be flashed on S5839i (or vice versa) because they use the same hardware, but not S5830, as it does not.

== Camera ==
The Samsung Galaxy Ace has a 5-megapixel auto-focus camera with a resolution of 2560 x 1920 pixels. It has a LED flash along with the camera for low-light scenes. It also has face and smile detection and geotagging, but does not have a shutter key. The contrast and brightness can be adjusted through on screen menu. It is also capable of up to 2x camera zoom.

== Video recording ==
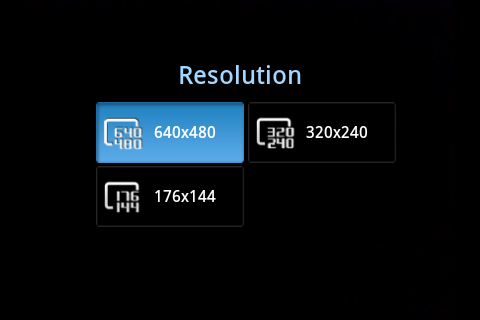
GT-S5830 “Cooper”: 640 × 480 px, 24 Hz

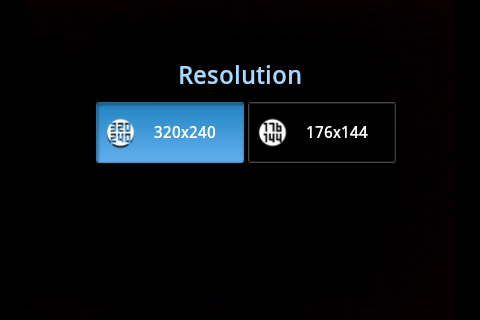
GT-S5830i “Cooperve”: 320 × 240 px, 20 Hz

== Gaming ==
Having an Adreno 200 GPU, and a lower processor with a lower screen resolution, the Galaxy Ace cannot run high-definition games; however, third-party developers can port some games to work on the Galaxy Ace. As in the GT-S5830i model, the device uses VideoCore IV which may introduce some improved characteristics but has major issues with games since neither Broadcom nor Samsung shares the source code; 3D games that work in original model might have incompatibilities with GT-S5830i. Games and Applications that are ported for the ARM6 do work on this phone.

== Samsung Galaxy Ace Plus ==
The Samsung Galaxy Ace Plus (GT-S7500[L/T/W]) is a later generation of the Samsung Galaxy Ace (GT-S5830), which was released in 2011. It features an 800 MHz single core processor and it also includes the upgraded GUI and TouchWiz 4.0 interface.

== Samsung Galaxy Ace Duos ==
On June 2012, Samsung released the Samsung Galaxy Ace Duos as a revision of the Samsung Galaxy Ace (GT-S5830). It features an 832 MHz processor and upgraded with 512MB of RAM, 3GB of internal storage, Bluetooth 3.0, Dual Sim and Dual Standby Support, released in 4 colors: White, Black, Yellow, La Fleur(Dark Pink with a floral motif).

== See also ==
- Samsung Galaxy Ace Plus
- Samsung Galaxy Ace 2
- Samsung Galaxy Ace 3
- Samsung Galaxy Ace 4
