= HTC Magic =

Android-based smartphone by HTC

HTC Magic NTT DoCoMo HT-03A T-Mobile myTouch 3G
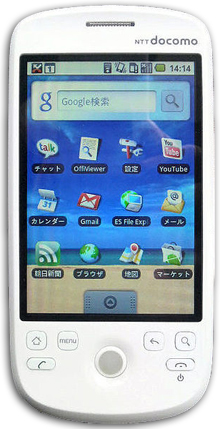
- NTT DoCoMo HT-03A
- Brand: HTC; NTT DoCoMo; T-Mobile
- Manufacturer: HTC
- Type: Smartphone
- Availability by region: Spain April 27, 2009; Taiwan May 2009; Canada June 2, 2009 (Rogers Wireless); Hong Kong, Netherlands, Singapore June 2009; United States July 29, 2009 (T-Mobile USA); Chile January 28, 2010
- Predecessor: HTC Dream
- Successor: HTC Hero
- Compatible networks: GSM/GPRS/EDGE 850 900 1800 1900 MHz; WCDMA/UMTS 900 1700 2100 MHz; HSDPA 7.2 Mbit/s; HSUPA 2 Mbit/s
- Form factor: Slate
- Dimensions: 113 mm (4.4 in) H 55.56 mm (2.187 in) W 13.65 mm (0.537 in) D
- Weight: 116 g (4.1 oz)
- Operating system: Original: Android 1.5 "Cupcake"; Current: Android 2.2.1 "Froyo"; Unofficial: Android 2.3.3 "Gingerbread"
- CPU: PVT32A 528 MHz Qualcomm MSM7200A ARM11; PVT32B 528 MHz Qualcomm MSM7201A ARM11
- Memory: PVT32A 288 MB RAM; PVT32B 192 MB RAM
- Storage: 512 MB ROM
- Removable storage: microSD (supports up to 16 GB)
- Battery: 1340 mAh, 3.7 V Internal Rechargeable Li-ion; User-replaceable
- Rear camera: 3.2 megapixel, autofocus
- Display: 320 x 480 px, 3.2 in (81 mm), HVGA, 65,536 color LCD at 180 pixels per inch (PPI)
- Connectivity: Bluetooth 2.1 + EDR with A2DP; HTC ExtUSB; Wi-Fi 802.11b/g
- Data inputs: Multi-touch capacitive touchscreen 3-axis accelerometer A-GPS; Push buttons Trackball
- SAR: Head: 0.783 W/kg 1 g Body: 0.973 W/kg 1 g Hotspot: -
- Hearing aid compatibility: M4

The HTC Magic (marketed as T-Mobile myTouch 3G in the United States, and as NTT DoCoMo HT-03A in Japan) is an Android smartphone designed and manufactured by HTC. It is HTC's second Android phone after HTC Dream, HTC's first touch-only flagship Android device and the second Android phone commercially released, as well as the first Android phone without a keyboard.

== Release ==
Vodafone unveiled the Magic on February 17, 2009 at the Mobile World Congress in Barcelona. The Magic went on sale in Spain on April 27, 2009, in the UK and Taiwan in May 2009, and in Singapore, Hong Kong, Canada and The Netherlands in June 2009. It became more widely available to customers in Germany (Vodafone), France (SFR), Philippines (SMART Communications), India (Airtel) and non-exclusively in Italy and Sweden, and in other countries. The device was released in Canada by Rogers Wireless on 2 June 2009. Vodafone has exclusive rights to sell the HTC Magic in some of the markets they service.

Pre-orders for the smartphone in the United States through T-Mobile USA began on 8 July 2009. T-Mobile officially released on 5 August 2009. In Russia, there was information that it would be available via Russian HTC official online store for about US$770, but soon HTC announced that it decided to sell another Android-powered device instead of HTC Magic. The first Android device officially sold in Russia was later revealed to be HTC Hero.

== Retail packaging ==
=== T-Mobile USA ===
The T-Mobile myTouch 3G comes bundled with a pair of headphones, an extUSB headphone adapter (which also serves as an in-line microphone), wall charger, USB Cable, Cloth Pouch, Screen Protector, and documentation, all inside a unique carrying case that also serves as the retail box. The Phone itself also has a 4 GB SanDisk Class 2 microSD Card (SDHC) inside. The T-Mobile myTouch 3G Fender LE comes with the same accessories except for the headphone adapter, and the microSD card that is included has a 16 GB capacity.

=== Vodafone ===
The Vodafone HTC Magic comes bundled with a pair of headphones, wall charger, USB cable and documentation. The phone comes with a 2 GB microSD card. The Vodafone Germany/New Zealand/Australia HTC Magic comes bundled with a pair of headphones, wall charger, USB cable, leatherette pouch and documentation. The phone comes with an 8 GB microSD card.

=== Rogers ===
The Rogers HTC Magic comes bundled with a pair of headphones, wall charger, USB cable, leather pouch, and documentation. The phone also includes a 2 GB microSD card. Unlike the T-Mobile model, it does not come with an extUSB headphone adapter. The HTC Magic was one of the first smartphones to be offered by Rogers.

== Software stack ==
HTC Magic runs the Android operating system and comes pre-installed with a WebKit-based browser. Other pre-installed software enables access to various Google services, including Gmail, Google Search, Google Maps, Google Talk and YouTube.

Like in HTC Dream, the Android Market application, which allows users to download new software applications from third-party developers, as well as providing publicly viewable ratings and comments, is also included with the device. Versions of HTC Magic for the Indian market do not have Google apps and Android Market access.

There also are several non-official versions of Android released for the Magic, such as CyanogenMod firmware, which offers enhanced performance and additional features.

== Software upgrades ==
Most carriers have upgraded this phone to Android 2.2 Froyo, including T-Mobile and Vodafone.

One exception is Rogers in Canada which has not upgraded the phone past Android 2.1, and NTT Docomo in Japan, which has not upgraded the phone past Android 1.6. Another is Proximus in Belgium and HTC in Taiwan, which has released no updates to the Android 1.6 firmware.

== Hardware ==
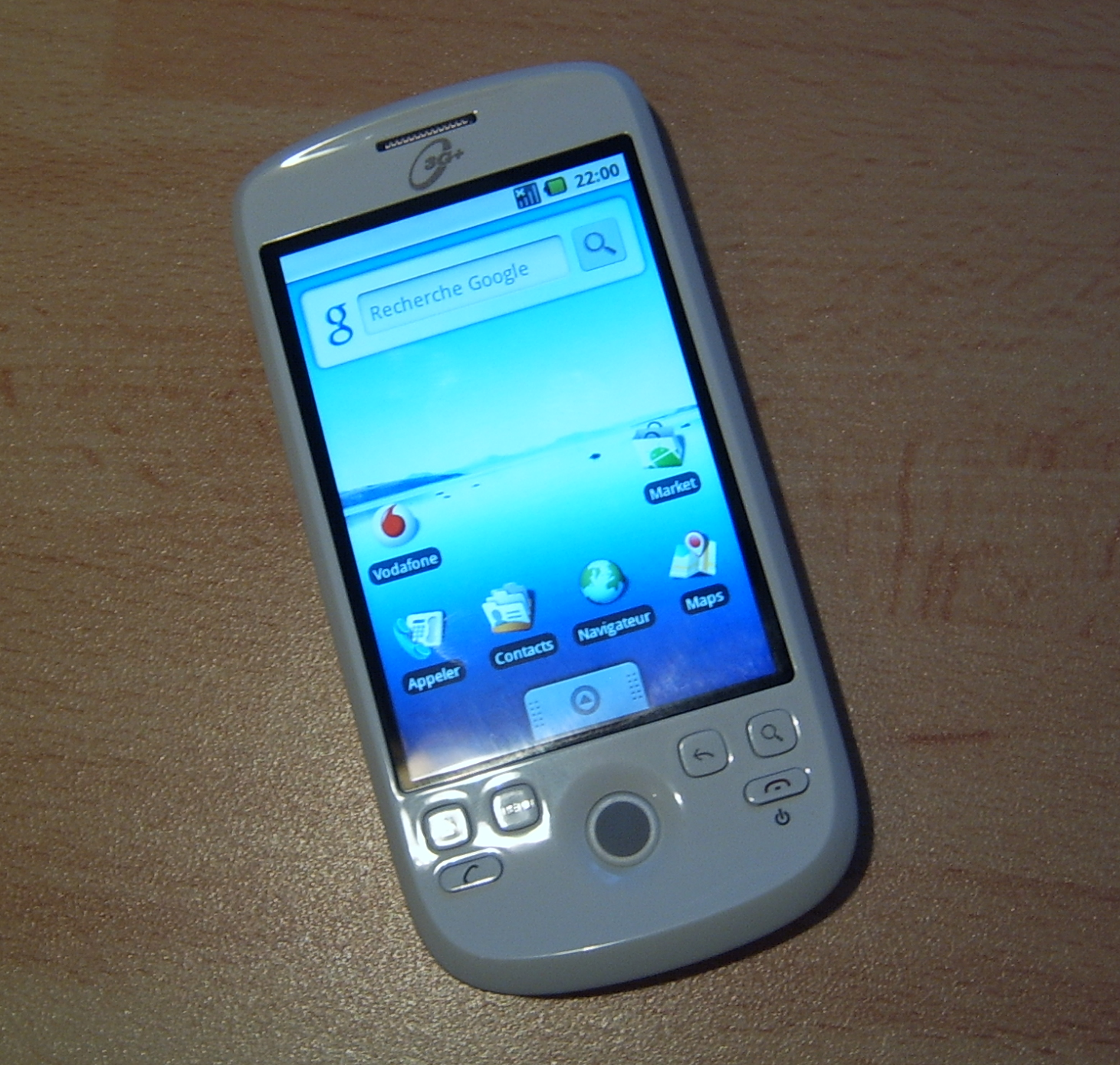
- HTC Magic G2
  Two different hardware platforms exist for this phone; they need different boot images and wireless LAN kernel modules:
  - The PVT32A, with a Qualcomm MSM7200A ARM11 processor, and 288 MB RAM.
  - The PVT32B, with a Qualcomm MSM7201A ARM11 processor, and 192 MB RAM.

The only models that use the 32B platform are the original T-Mobile myTouch 3G (v1.2 of this phone, released in Feb 2010, switched to the 32A), the Vodafone Magic in some countries, the Google Ion developer phone, and the NTT DoCoMo HT-03A.

- Three different 3G radio configurations exist for this phone (listed in the order in which they were released):
  - The T-Mobile and Google models support AWS (band IV) and IMT (band I), so they are compatible with the 3G networks of T-Mobile and WIND Canada, and some carriers in Europe and Asia.
  - The 'world' version of this phone supports IMT (band I) and GSM (band VIII), so it is compatible with 3G networks in Europe, Asia, and Brazil.
  - The Rogers Canada version of this phone support PCS (band II) and CLR (band V) so it is compatible with the 3G networks of AT&T in the U.S., and with Rogers, Fido (Rogers), Bell, and Telus in Canada.

(All of these support the same four standard 2G GSM frequencies, so they can be used without 3G on most GSM networks anywhere in the world.)

- The PVT32B HTC Magic lacks a 3.5 mm TRS jack for headphones and requires an adapter – this was sometimes bundled with the phone.
- Some PVT32A models (such as the Fender T-Mobile myTouch 3G and the T-Mobile myTouch 3G 1.2 in the US) added a built-in headphone jack on top of the phone.
- This phone has a hearing aid compatibility rating of M4.
- Display: 3.2-inch (8.1 cm) thin-film transistor (TFT) LCD flat glass touch-sensitive HVGA screen with 480 X 320 pixel resolution. The capacitive touchscreen makes it impossible to use a standard stylus. Users can interact to display or move content with a finger touch, tapping or touch-drag motion. The touchscreen hardware is capable of multitouch gestures, but until more recently, official releases of Android (v1.0 to v1.6) available for the Magic had this functionality disabled at the kernel level. Users had to patch the supplied version of Android or download a hacked version or update to Android 2.0 or later to make use of the multi-touch screen. However, an upgrade to Android 2.2 is now officially available.
- CPU: The MSM7200A (PVT32A) or MSM7201A (PVT32B) is an ARM-based, dual-core CPU/GPU from Qualcomm and contains many built-in features, including 3G and a GPU capable of up to 4 million triangles/sec. It has hardware acceleration for Java, but this does not accelerate execution of Android applications, as they are targeted to the Dalvik virtual machine, not the Java virtual machine.
- Keyboard The HTC Magic does not have a physical keyboard. Text input is done through an on-screen keyboard. The keyboard can be set to provide haptic and sound feedback when keys are pressed. The HTC Magic has a built in accelerometer which rotates the keyboard between portrait and landscape view automatically based on the orientation of the phone. The HTC Magic also has a number of physical back-lit buttons:
  - Send (green): Launches the dialer to call a number, or accepts an incoming call, or hold to launch the voice dialer.
  - Home: Returns to the android home screen, or hold to open up a list of recently used applications.
  - Menu: Opens up the menu of the active application, or hold to open up the keyboard.
  - Back: Exits out of the keyboard, or returns to the prior application, or prior page in the web browser.
  - Search: Launches a search function in the active application, or hold to launch voice search.
  - End (red): Ends a call if there is a call currently active, or puts the phone into sleep mode, or hold to power off the phone.
  - Trackball: Backlit Trackball navigates between menus or scroll through a line of text, press down to select the highlighted item.
  - The HTC Magic also has an LED indicator which flashes for missed calls, text messages, or lights up orange when charging, or green when charging is 90% or higher. There is also a Volume Rocker on the left side of the phone. There is no physical dedicated camera button.
- Camera: The HTC Magic has a 3.2-megapixel camera with autofocus functionality.
- Video: The HTC Magic can play H.264, streaming, 3GPP, MPEG4, and 3GP files. There is no light ("flash") for the camera in low light conditions. Video recording and uploading to YouTube is available as of Android 1.5, recording resolution 352x288 H.263 3GP, mono sound @ 8 kHz.
- Storage: The HTC Magic has a microSD card slot. It has been confirmed to work with capacities up to 16 GB, and may work with larger cards. When the USB cable is connected to a computer, this computer can access the card without removing it from the HTC Magic. The phone can access media files arranged in folders, but the folders must be created from a third-party file management application or from a computer.
- Battery: The HTC Magic has a user-replaceable, 3.7 V, 1340 mAh rechargeable lithium-ion battery, which is advertised to offer up to 600 hours of standby power.
- Location: The HTC Magic has a built in GPS receiver for location functionality including free turn-by-turn GPS (Google Maps Navigation, originally only in the United States, now also available in the United Kingdom). It can also use cell towers and wifi hotspots to help determine its location. The HTC Magic has a built in digital Compass to help determine its orientation.
- Case: Three different colors are available for the myTouch 3G: Black (Gray Trim), Merlot (Black Trim), and White (Silver Trim). The Google Ion version of the HTC Magic is black with a dark blue trim and silver buttons. The Vodafone HTC Magic is white with a silver trim.
- Connectivity: The HTC Magic supports WiFi, 3G UMTS and HSPA, EDGE, and GPRS networks. The myTouch 3G supports AT&T's network, but only on 2G/EDGE.

== Successors marketed by T-Mobile USA ==
T-Mobile USA released the myTouch 3G Slide June 2, 2010 in the United States. The myTouch 3G Slide runs Android 2.2 Froyo and has a 3.4-inch touch screen and a 5-megapixel auto focus camera with LED flash.

T-Mobile USA released the myTouch 4G November 3, 2010 in the United States. The myTouch 4G runs Android 2.2 Froyo. The myTouch4G features a 3.8-inch touch screen, a 5-megapixel auto-focus rear camera with LED flash, a front-facing VGA camera for video chat and can be used as a Wi-Fi Hotspot for up to 4 devices. The myTouch 4G supports T-Mobile's 4G HSPA+ network.

== See also ==
- Android (operating system)
- HTC Dream (T-Mobile G1)
- HTC Hero
- HTC Tattoo
- Nexus One
