= T-Mobile myTouch 4G =

Smartphone manufactured by T-Mobile

T-Mobile myTouch 4G/HTC Panache 4G
- Brand: T-Mobile
- Manufacturer: HTC Corporation
- Type: Smartphone
- Series: myTouch, Android
- First released: United States: November 3, 2010; 15 years ago (T-Mobile USA); Canada: July 8, 2011; 15 years ago (Mobilicity)
- Predecessor: myTouch 3G Slide
- Successor: T-Mobile myTouch 4G Slide
- Compatible networks: GSM 850/900/1800/1900; GPRS Class 10; EDGE Class 10 UMTS Bands I and IV; HSPA+ 14.4, HSUPA 5.76
- Form factor: Slate
- Dimensions: 4.8 in (120 mm) H 2.44 in (62 mm) W 0.43 in (11 mm) D
- Weight: 5.4 oz (150 g)
- Operating system: Android 2.2.1 Froyo upgradeable to Android 2.3.3 Gingerbread
- CPU: 1GHz Qualcomm MSM8255 Snapdragon
- Memory: 768 MB RAM
- Storage: 4 GB (1 GB available for storage)
- Removable storage: 8 GB microSD flash memory (supports up to 32 GB)
- Battery: 1,400mAh Internal rechargeable Li-ion, user replaceable
- Rear camera: Photo 5 megapixel 2592 × 1456 px max Autofocus; LED flash Video 1280×720 px max (720p)
- Front camera: VGA
- Display: TFT LCD 3.8 in (97 mm) Super LCD; 480×800 px widescreen (246 PPI); 16M colors
- Connectivity: 3.5 mm TRRS; Bluetooth 2.1 + EDR with A2DP; FM radio Micro USB 2.0; DLNA; Wi-Fi 802.11b/g/n
- Data inputs: Multi-touch capacitive touchscreen 3-axis accelerometer A-GPS; Ambient light sensor Magnetometer; Microphone; Proximity sensor Push buttons Touchpad
- SAR: Head 0.94 W/kg; Body 1.03 W/kg
- Hearing aid compatibility: M3
- Other: Wi-Fi hotspot USB tethering

The T-Mobile myTouch 4G is a smartphone designed and manufactured by HTC Corporation for T-Mobile USA's "myTouch" re-branded series of phones. HTC's name for the device during development was "Glacier". This is T-Mobile's second "4G" phone, after the T-Mobile G2, and the third smartphone by T-Mobile that runs the Android 2.2 Froyo software. The phone was released in black, red, and white colors.

== International release ==
The T-Mobile myTouch 4G was released in Canada on the Mobilicity network as the "HTC Panache 4G" with the original, unmodified HTC Sense 2.1 user interface on top of Android 2.3.3 Gingerbread and with the genius key replaced with search functionality. The HTC Panache 4G was available for $299.99 CA on the Mobilicity web site.

== Features ==
The myTouch 4G supports Wi-Fi, 3G UMTS and HSPA+, EDGE, and GPRS networks. The myTouch 4G is supported by T-Mobile 4G. The myTouch 4G also supports Wi-Fi Calling.

== Hardware ==
The T-Mobile myTouch 4G runs on a 1 GHz Qualcomm Snapdragon processor with 768 MB of RAM. It has a 5.0 MP camera with auto-focus and flash that also captures 720p HD-quality video. It sports a front-facing video camera for video chat and video calls, has a wireless card supporting a/b/g/n connections, and a bluetooth 2.1+EDR chip. The myTouch 4G has a lithium-ion battery that is capable of up to 10 hours of talk time and 18 days of standby time.

== Screen ==
The myTouch 4G has a 3.8" Super LCD that brings along Sony's VSPEC III technology providing an 800:1 contrast ratio and a viewing angle of up to 160 degrees.

Some models of the phone have been shipped with a screen manufactured by Sharp that has a lower contrast ratio and a poorer viewing angle. (Note: Figuring out what model LCD has been used on your phone, Sony's LCD-SO-C2 or Sharp's LCD-SH-C2, is very simple. Simply download and install a Terminal emulator, then restart the phone. As soon as the phone is started, start the terminal emulator and type in dmesg | grep tag_panel_parsing and press enter. If it says <7>[ 0.0000000] tag_panel_parsing: panel type = 1 then the LCD is the lower quality model from Sharp, whereas if it says <7>[ 0.0000000] tag_panel_parsing: panel type = 2. it is the higher quality Sony LCD.)

== Package contents ==
The T-Mobile myTouch 4G comes bundled with a pair of headphones, USB cable and documentation, all inside a unique carrying case that also serves as the retail box. The phone itself also has an 8 GB SanDisk Class 4 microSD Card (SDHC) inside and is expandable up to 32 GB.

== Commercials ==
In November 2010, T-Mobile began airing a series of popular television commercials mocking Apple's Mac vs. PC commercials by portraying the iPhone and AT&T network as "a haggard pair of piggybacking fellows" and the myTouch 4G as model Carly Foulkes.

== Controversy ==
As with many other Android phones, the official software updates for the phone remain controversial. T-Mobile has officially stated that an update to Android 2.3 "Gingerbread" would be made. In July 2011, it was revealed that an official update was finished and would be available onwards from 20 July 2011, via the means of the over-the-air programming.

However, to date, many customers have never received the update, and T-Mobile support representatives on Twitter suggested in October 2011 that the OTA update is no longer available as T-Mobile is working on further improvements before making the update available again. No clarification is ever given on the exact reasons why the update is no longer available, or why it was pulled out, or what further improvements are required to be completed before it would be available again. Moreover, there is no option within the interface that allows users to check for updates. (Note: 1. checkin*#*# (e.g. *#*#2432546#*#*) might work for some.)

Although the update is offered in some T-Mobile retail stores through an in-store microSD card update, such procedure represents a significant inconvenience to the customers, as it requires finding a T-Mobile store which offers the update, planning an hour-long visit to the store, and having a fully charged battery prior to the visit.

As such, T-Mobile users still don't have any means to perform a supported and official update from 2.2 to 2.3 at their convenience at home.

According to a T-Mobile Support post on December 19, 2011, beginning December 20, 2011, T-Mobile will start an over-the-air (OTA) update for the T-Mobile myTouch 4G. This update is to Android 2.3.4 / Software version 2.32.531.1. The OTA roll-out will complete by January 23, 2012. Users that have received the 2.3+ system update are able to manually check for system updates via the settings menu.

However, according to a T-Mobile support post on January 25, 2012, the OTA update was "paused for customers whose devices are currently on Android 2.2. HTC has stated they paused the update to improve the update utility." These customers "[c]annot download the update manually, nor receive it as an OTA. T-Mobile does not know when the update will resume."
