= Swype =

Virtual keyboard application

- Developer: Nuance (Microsoft)
- Release: December 2, 2009
- Final release: Android; 1.6.20 (November 19, 2014; 11 years ago) [±]
- Operating system: Android 2.2 and later, Bada, MeeGo, Symbian, Windows 7, Windows Mobile, iOS 8 and later
- Type: Virtual keyboard, speech recognition
- License: Proprietary

Swype was a virtual keyboard for touchscreen smartphones and tablets originally developed by Swype Inc., founded in 2002, where the user enters words by sliding a finger or stylus from the first letter of a word to its last letter, lifting only between words. It uses error-correction algorithms and a language model to predict the intended word. It also includes a predictive text system, handwriting and speech recognition support. Swype was first commercially available on the Samsung Omnia II running Windows Mobile, and was originally pre-loaded on specific devices.

In October 2011, Swype Inc. was acquired by Nuance Communications where the company continued its development and implemented its speech recognition algorithm, Dragon Dictation.

In February 2018, Nuance announced that it had stopped development on the app and that no further updates would be made to it. The Android app was pulled from the Play Store. The iOS app was also pulled from the App Store. The trial version of Swype is not visible anymore for users in the Play Store except for users who have installed the app by accessing it in the installed apps part of the Play Store. Cloud features of the paid version such as "Backup&Sync" no longer function, and Nuance Communications has refused to issue refunds to customers who have purchased the app and can no longer reinstall it.

== Software ==
Swype consists of three major components that contribute to its accuracy and speed: an input path analyzer, a word search engine with a corresponding database, and a manufacturer-customizable interface.

The creators of Swype predicted that users will achieve over 50 words per minute, with the chief technical officer (CTO) and founder Cliff Kushler claiming to have reached 55 words per minute.

Swype was listed among Time magazine's 50 Best Android Applications for 2013.

=== Use records ===
On 22 March 2010, a Swype employee, Franklin Page, set a new Guinness World Record of 35.54 seconds (sec) for the fastest typing of a predetermined (test) text message on a touchscreen mobile phone—Guiness uses a 25 word test message—using Swype on the Samsung i8000, which he reportedly improved on 22 August of that year to 25.94 sec (corresponding to a speed of nearly 58 words per minute, or 370 characters per minute), using a Samsung Galaxy S. The record has since been bettered further times, for instance by a teen using the Fleksy app on an iPhone, to 18.19 sec.

=== Languages ===
As of March 2018, Swype supported the following languages:

| | Keyboard | Handwriting | Dragon Dictation |
|---|---|---|---|
| Afrikaans | Yes | Yes | No |
| Albanian | Yes | No | No |
| Arabic | Yes | Yes | Yes |
| Armenian | Yes | No | No |
| Azerbaijani | Yes | No | No |
| Basque | Yes | Yes | No |
| Belarusian | Yes | No | No |
| Bosnian | Yes | No | No |
| Bulgarian | Yes | Yes | No |
| Burmese | Yes | No | No |
| Burmese (Zawgyi font) | Yes | No | No |
| Catalan | Yes | Yes | Yes |
| Chinese (CN, TW, HK) | Yes | Yes | Yes |
| Croatian | Yes | Yes | Yes |
| Czech | Yes | Yes | Yes |
| Danish | Yes | Yes | Yes |
| Dutch (BE) | Yes | Yes | Yes |
| Dutch | Yes | Yes | Yes |
| English | Yes | Yes | Yes |
| English (US) | Yes | Yes | Yes |
| Estonian | Yes | Yes | No |
| Farsi | Yes | Yes | No |
| Finnish | Yes | Yes | Yes |
| French (FR, CA, CH) | Yes | Yes | Yes |
| Galician | Yes | Yes | No |
| Georgian | Yes | Yes | No |
| German | Yes | Yes | Yes |
| German (CH) | Yes | Yes | No |
| Greek | Yes | Yes | Yes |
| Gujarati | Yes | No | No |
| Hebrew | Yes | Yes | Yes |
| Hindi | Yes | No | Yes |
| Hinglish | Yes | No | Yes |
| Hungarian | Yes | Yes | Yes |
| Icelandic | Yes | Yes | No |
| Indonesian | Yes | Yes | Yes |
| Irish | Yes | No | No |
| Italian | Yes | Yes | Yes |
| Italian (CH) | Yes | Yes | No |
| Japanese | Yes | Yes | Yes |
| Javanese | Yes | No | No |
| Kannada | Yes | No | No |
| Kazakh | Yes | No | No |
| Khmer | Yes | No | No |
| Korean | Yes | Yes | Yes |
| Latvian | Yes | Yes | No |
| Lithuanian | Yes | Yes | No |
| Macedonian | Yes | No | No |
| Malay | Yes | Yes | Yes |
| Malayalam | Yes | No | No |
| Marathi | Yes | No | No |
| Norwegian | Yes | Yes | Yes |
| Polish | Yes | Yes | Yes |
| Portuguese (BR, PT) | Yes | Yes | Yes |
| Romanian | Yes | Yes | Yes |
| Russian | Yes | Yes | Yes |
| Serbian | Yes | Yes | No |
| Sesotho | Yes | No | No |
| Sinhala | Yes | No | No |
| Slovak | Yes | Yes | Yes |
| Slovenian | Yes | Yes | No |
| Spanish | Yes | Yes | Yes |
| Sundanese | Yes | No | No |
| Swahili | Yes | Yes | No |
| Swedish | Yes | Yes | Yes |
| Tagalog | Yes | Yes | No |
| Tamil | Yes | No | No |
| Telugu | Yes | No | No |
| Thai | Yes | Yes | Yes |
| Turkish | Yes | Yes | Yes |
| Ukrainian | Yes | Yes | Yes |
| Urdu | Yes | Yes | No |
| Vietnamese | Yes | No | Yes |
| Xhosa | Yes | No | No |
| Zulu | Yes | No | No |

== Availability ==
In February 2018, the Android app was pulled from the Play Store. The iOS app was also pulled from the App Store.

Starting from 2018, users need to use a 3rd party service to download the full version of Swype.

In late February 2018, the full version of Swype was discontinued. The trial version of Swype is hidden from the Play Store and App Store. The Swype website was also discontinued and has become a redirect page to XT9 Smart Input.

In a statement emailed to The Verge, Nuance Communications said it would discontinue support of the Swype keyboard app and instead focus on other products. "The core technology behind Swype will continue to be utilized and improved upon across other Nuance offerings—and integrated into our broader AI-powered solutions—most notably in Android-based keyboard solutions for our automotive customers," the company said.

== See also ==
- Microsoft SwiftKey
- Dasher (software)
- Keyboard (computing)
- Multi-touch
- Shorthand
- T9 (predictive text)
