= Terravision =

3D mapping software

- Developers: SRI International, ART+COM, Berlin
- Initial release: 1989; 36 years ago
- Type: Virtual globe
- License: Freeware

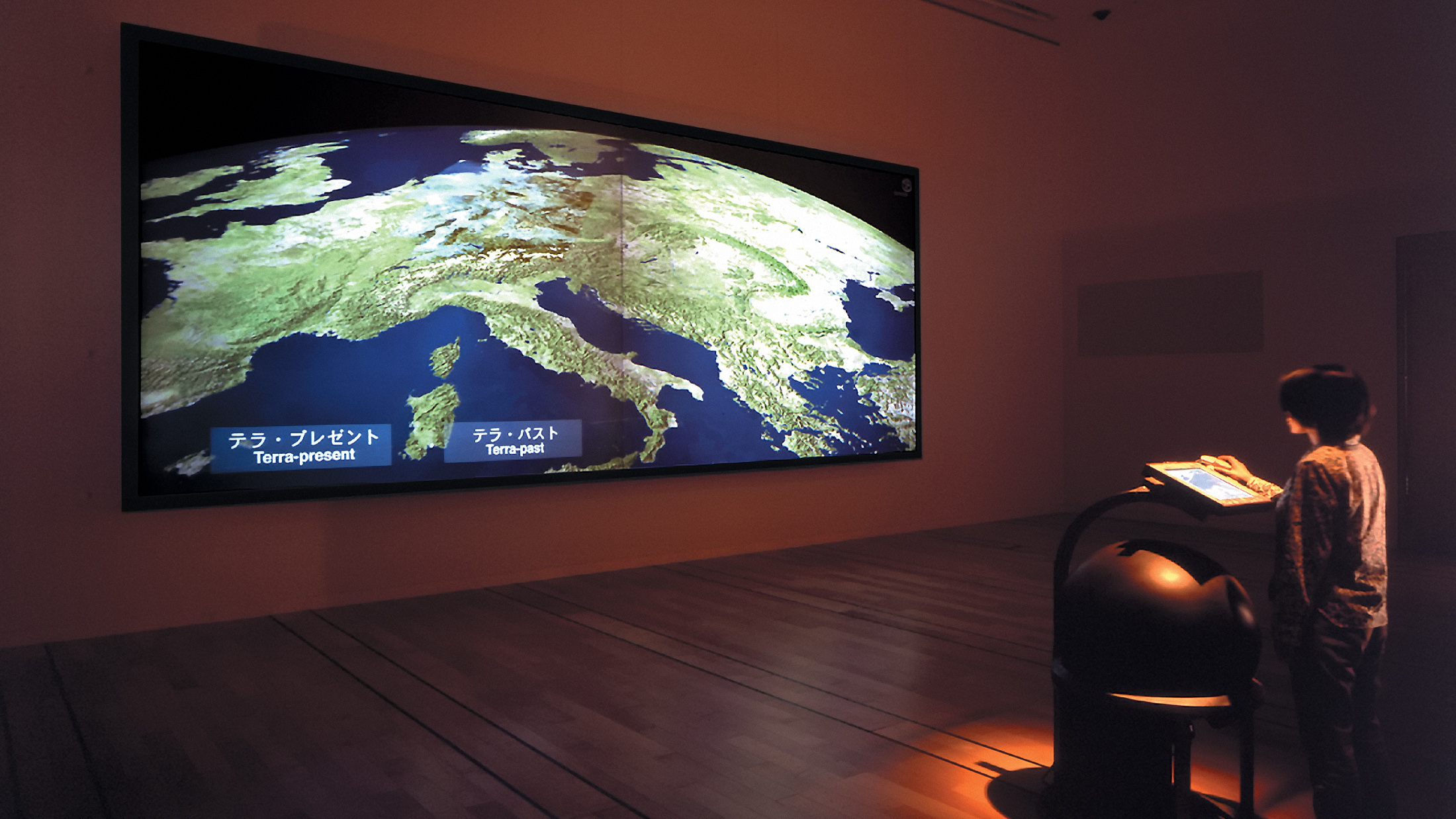
Terravision installation at NTT InterCommunication Center, 1998

Terravision is a 3D mapping software developed in 1993 by the German company ART+COM in Berlin as a "networked virtual representation of the Earth based on satellite images, aerial shots, altitude data and architectural data". Development of the project was supported by the Deutsche Post (now Deutsche Telekom).

Google Earth was released in 2001. Because Terravision was the first system to provide a seamless web navigation and visualization of the earth in a massively large spatial data environment, Joachim Sauter called it a prequel to Google Earth. In 2014, ART+COM filed a lawsuit against Google, claiming it infringed the 1995 patent rights of Terravision. In May 2016 the jury of the United States District Court for the District of Delaware found in favor of Google. ART+COM also lost on appeal at the Court of Appeals for the Federal Circuit in 2017.

== Description ==
Terravision is a networked virtual representation of the Earth based on satellite images, aerial shots, altitude data and architectural data collected by the company in 1993.

The project was realized by Joachim Sauter, Pavel Mayer, Axel Schmidt, Gerd Grueneis, Dirk Luesebrink, Hendrik Tramberend and Steffen Meschkat using Onyx Computers developed by Silicon Graphics, Inc.

== History ==
Terravision was developed starting in 1993, originally as an art project by ART+COM in Berlin, a collective of artists and computer hackers, some from the Chaos Computer Club. In 1995, ART+COM filed a patent called "Method and Device for Pictorial Representation of Space-related Data." In 1995, then Deutsche Post (now Deutsche Telekom) approached Art+Com searching for high-end applications for its high-speed VBN network.

In 1994, Art+COM presented its project then named it T_Vision at the ITU Plenipotentiary Conference in Kyoto, on twin monitors of a RealityEngine by Silicon Graphics. An image of the earth in space on a five-foot television screen could be spun by a large trackball beside it. According to Mark Pesce, ART+COM's two main programmers Pavel Meyer and Axel Schmidt were able to fix the software program which they had set up in Berlin on a different machine, in the last 10 minutes prior to opening of the conference. T_Vision was shown one month later to the public for the first time at the Interactive Media Festival in the Variety Arts Center, Los Angeles, winning the judge's $5,000 prize.

=== Lawsuit against Google ===
Google Earth was released in 2001. By 2006, Art+Com emailed Google about Terravision. Google chief technology officer Michael Jones visited to discuss licensing and Michelle Lee, then a Google lawyer, showed interest in the patent. However Art+Com did not accept the offer, and in 2010 reissued its patent, asking Google to get a license under their patent. When this did not occur, Art+Com filed a lawsuit against Google in February 2014 for patent infringement, seeking US$100 million.

In May 2016, the jury of the United States District Court for the District of Delaware found that a Stanford Research Institute (SRI) geographical visualization system known as "SRI TerraVision" was used earlier than Terravision.

In October 2017, the Court of Appeals for the Federal Circuit affirmed that decision and invalidated Art+Com's patent.

== In popular culture ==
Terravision and its creators feature in the 2021 German miniseries The Billion Dollar Code made by Netflix which recounts the history of the program in a fictionalized account and ends with the 2014 patent infringement lawsuit they brought against Google. The series, which was shown on Netflix is prefaced by an episode of interviews with the ART+COM developers of Terravision and their legal representative.
