= ART+COM =

German design agency

ART+COM AG
- Type: Joint-stock company
- Industry: Design and multimedia
- Founded: 1988
- Headquarters: Berlin, Germany
- Key people: Andreas Wiek (CEO); Joachim Sauter † (Board member and Head of Design)
- Number of employees: 80 (2013)
- Website: www.artcom.de

Art+Com (stylized as ART+COM) is a German design agency based in Berlin. The company describes itself as a studio for media communication in space and creates interactive installations, media spaces, and architectures.

== History ==
=== Foundation and artistic beginnings ===
The agency was founded in 1988 by artists, designers, scientists, and IT specialists from the Berlin University of the Arts and the Berlin section of the Chaos Computer Club to explore the computer as a medium of communication. Initially, the research focus was in the area of virtual reality and interface design. The work presented at Ars Electronica in 1992, the Zerseher (Disviewer), promoted the computer as a new artistic medium and interaction as one of its outstanding features. The painting Boy with a Child's Drawing in His Hand by Giovanni Francesco Caroto "dissolved" wherever the viewer looked. The longer the digital image was viewed, the more abstract it became. The viewer's gaze was tracked using eye tracking technology and a generative algorithm controlled the change of the image in real-time.

=== Terravision ===
From 1991, a planet browser was conceptualized and developed with funding from Deutsche Telekom's subsidiary Berkom, which visualized information based on location. In 1994, it was publicly presented for the first time under the name TerraVision at the ITU conference in Kyoto. Terravision combined aerial photography, satellite images, elevation and weather data of the Earth, through which one could navigate in real-time. The system was also used to visualize the then still developing plans for the new Berlin city center.

After a presentation at SIGGRAPH in 1995, the installation was showcased at SGI's demonstration center in Mountain View. Developers present there subsequently developed a very similar application called Earth Viewer, which later became Google Earth. According to Art+Com, Earth Viewer was a replica of Terravision that violated a patent filed by Art+Com in the US in 1996. However, a patent lawsuit filed against Google in the US in 2014 was dismissed in 2017.

The story of Terravision and the subsequent legal dispute was dramatized in the 2021 Netflix miniseries The Billion Dollar Code.

=== Conversion to a corporation and further projects ===
In 1995, the association was transformed into a private limited company, which three years later was converted into a non-publicly traded joint-stock company.

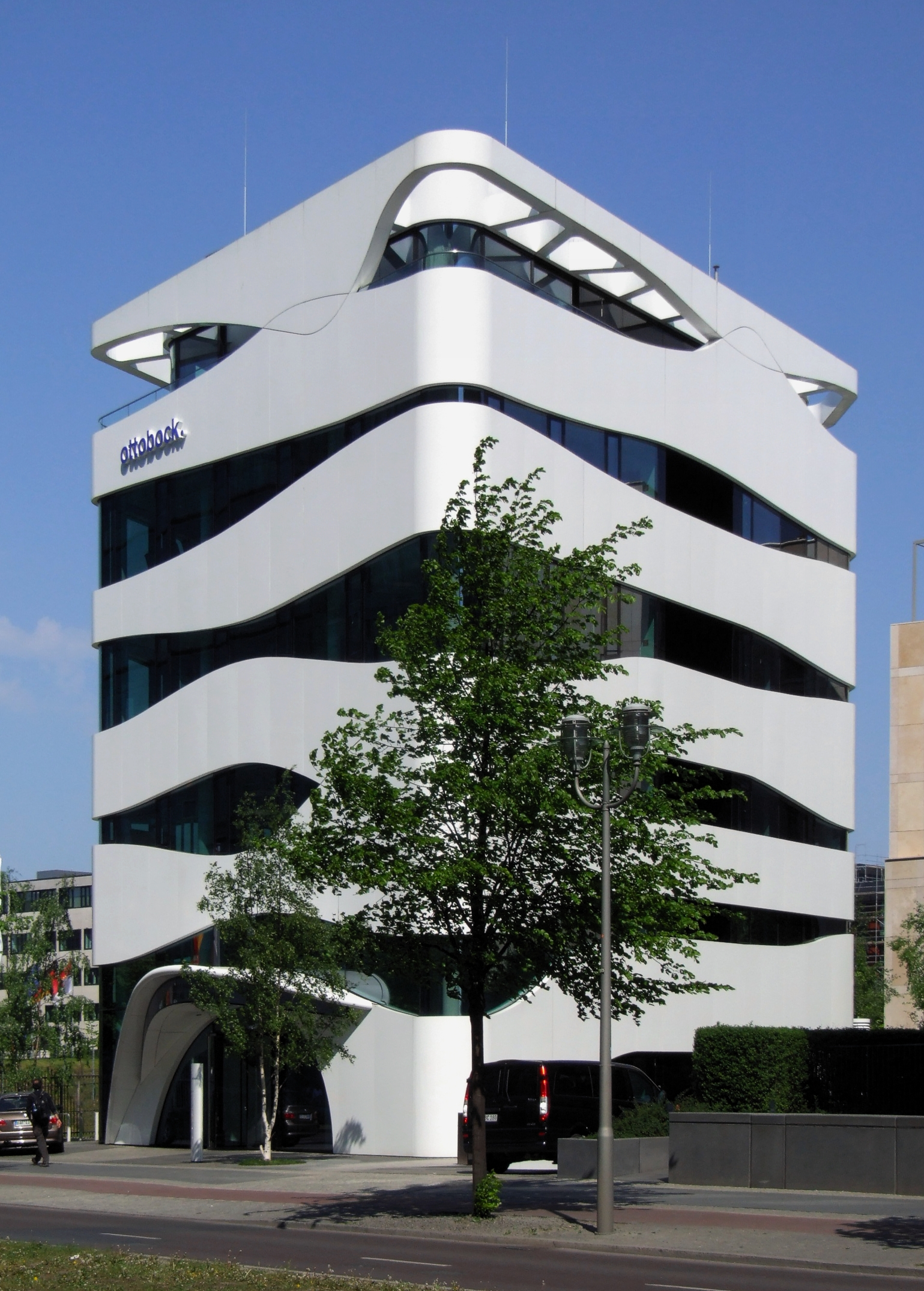
Otto Bock Science Center in Berlin

In 1999, the Urban Jungle Pack—a 10 kg "data backpack" tested by Radio Fritz during the Love Parade for live transmission of images, sounds, and texts—failed due to the inadequate performance of the mobile network at that time. In the following years, 3D visualizations of archaeological research were successfully presented. TrojaVR allowed a tour through virtual Troy, and as part of the EU project The Neanderthal Tools, three-dimensional representations of the then known and collected Neanderthal findings were made available to researchers worldwide via Nespos, based on MRI and CT scans.

In 2004, the installation floating.numbers at the Jewish Museum Berlin introduced a multi-touch table for the first time, depicting the power of numbers and their significance. With the design of Berlin's Museum of Natural History and the Jurascopes—digital binoculars that place the dinosaur exhibits in their original environment—the exhibition The New Austria at the Belvedere in Vienna in 2005, as well as numerous showrooms for corporate and product presentations, the company shifted its focus to interactive installations in space.

The media design of the BMW Museum in Munich with the Mediatektur—an inner square that is illuminated across more than 700 m^{2} with over 1.7 million LEDs and can respond to visitors via camera tracking—and the multi-award-winning kinetic sculpture, which visualizes the creative process in automotive development using 714 individually suspended and controlled metal balls, was realized by Art+Com in collaboration with the architectural firm Atelier Brückner. The exhibition Level Green in the Autostadt and the Otto Bock Science Center, for which the interactive exhibits and the media facade were designed and developed, were completed in 2009. The following year, the Boulevard der Stars (Boulevard of Stars) at Potsdamer Platz in Berlin, designed in collaboration with Graft, was opened.

In 2019, the permanent exhibition of the Futurium in Berlin, designed by Art+Com and Schiel Projekt, opened. The following year, it was awarded a Golden Nail by the Art Directors Club and received the European Museum Prize.

== Awards (selection) ==
- Art Directors Club: Kinetic Sculpture (various Gold national and international), Futurium (Gold in Experience Design)
- Cannes Lion: Kinetic Sculpture, Mediatektur (Gold)
- Clio Awards: Kinetic Sculpture (Gold), Mediatektur (Silver)
- D&AD Awards: Kinetic Sculpture (Black Pencil, 2× Yellow Pencil), Duality, Jurascope (each Bronze)
- Red Dot Design Award: including Duality, Jurascope, The Football Experience, floating.numbers
- BAFTA Interactive Environment Award: The Famous Grouse Experience
- iF Design Award: The New Austria, documenta mobil

== Literature ==
- Jürgen Christ: Die Daten-Jongleure (The Data Jugglers). In: Focus. Vol. 3, No. 12 (March 20, 1995), ISSN 0943-7576, pp. 162–165.
- Joachim Sauter, Susanne Jaschko, Jussi Ängeslevä: ART+COM : Medien, Räume und Installationen (ART+COM: Media, Spaces and Installations). Die Gestalten Verlag, Berlin 2011, ISBN 978-3-89955-386-4.

== See also ==
- Media in Berlin
