= VBN =

VBN may refer to:

- Visitor Based Network, a computer network intended for mobile users in need of temporary Internet access
- VBN, the Indian Railways station code for Vallabhnagar railway station, Rajasthan, India
