= The Billion Dollar Code =

2021 German television series

- Release poster
- Genre: Crime; Drama; Thriller
- Directed by: Robert Thalheim
- Starring: Björn Freiberg; Seumas F. Sargent; Leonard Scheicher
- Country of origin: Germany
- Original language: German
- No. of episodes: 4

Production
- Running time: 58–77 minutes
- Production companies: Kundschafter Filmproduktion; Sunny Side Up Films

Original release
- Network: Netflix
- Release: October 7, 2021

The Billion Dollar Code is a 2021 German television miniseries starring Björn Freiberg, Seumas F. Sargent and Leonard Scheicher. Based on true events, the series was developed for Netflix, where it was first aired in October 2021 along with an additional feature story episode.

== Plot ==
The plot follows two interconnected timelines. In Berlin of the 1990s, a group of young hackers and art students had founded the ART+COM collaboration to play at the cutting edge of computer programming and digital art. They had developed a planet browser in 1991 which was used by Joachim Sauter to get funding from Deutsche Telekom in 1993 to start the successful development of TerraVision. In the series, the ART+COM beginnings were dropped, while several of the real persons and stakeholders were fused to a smaller cast, with the fictional Carsten Schlüter as the main artist and Juri Müller as the main programmer.

The other storyline revolves around the 2014 patent infringement dispute against Google, alleging that TerraVision was used to develop Google Earth. The fictional character Brian Anderson is based on Brian McClendon and Michael T Jones who did found Keyhole Inc to develop a planet browser. That company was bought by Google in 2004. The movie dramatized facets of the real lawsuit that lasted until 2017, with the script reproducing only parts of the actual court statements to avoid coming into conflict with Google and having key parts of the proceedings fictionalized or omitted.

== Trivia ==
- The names of the main characters were changed for dramatic purposes and multiple involved people were merged into two, among them Joachim Sauter, Pavel Mayer, Axel Schmidt and Gerd Grüneis.
- The featurette shows the actual persons involved in the TerraVision project, except for Professor Joachim Sauter who died in July 2021.
- One of the co-founders of Keyhole has published a first-hand account claiming to debunk the origins, timelines and interpretations depicted in the fictionalized miniseries.

== Discrepancies ==
The miniseries dramatizes the lawsuit, the proceedings of which lasted until 2017. Art+Com lost at trial and on appeal. The filmmakers used portions of the trial transcript to avoid coming into conflict with Google, but key aspects of the trial were entirely fictionalized or omitted. The actual decision of the court was in fact based on other findings.

- In the Netflix series, the character Brian Anderson is asked his opinion under oath about the Terravision software and says, “To be honest, it was fantastic then and fantastic now.” When Michael T. Jones testified, he did say “It was fantastic then and it is fantastic now”, but he was talking about the ball interface, a 3D mouse. He went on to say: “And I liked the ball a lot, actually. But as far as the actual computer part, I was not particularly impressed with that part.”
- In the Netflix series, the character Brian Anderson is portrayed as having lied under oath in response to the question “Did you tell Mr. Müller that Google Earth never would have been possible without Terravision?” In reality, Michael T. Jones was never asked this question. Michael T. Jones died in January 2021.
- The Netflix series depicts the invalidation of Art+Com's patent at trial, but does not portray the testimony of Stephen Lau, a former employee of the federally-funded, not-for-profit Stanford Research Institute ("SRI"), whose testimony is principally responsible for the patent's invalidation. He testified that he developed an earth visualization application for SRI called TerraVision, and that he shared and discussed SRI TerraVision's code with Art+Com. Both SRI and Art+Com systems used a multi-resolution pyramid of imagery to let users zoom from high to low altitudes, and both were called Terravision. Art+Com agreed to rename their product because SRI's came first. Because Art+Com did not include reference to SRI's TerraVision as "prior art" in its patent application, Art+Com's patent was declared invalid. Stephen Lau died from COVID-19 in March 2020.

== Cast ==
- Björn Freiberg as Interpreter
- Seumas F. Sargent as Eric Spears
- Leonard Scheicher as Carsten Schlüter (younger)
- Lukas Loughran as Brian Anderson
- Marius Ahrendt as Juri Müller (younger)
- Dan Cade as Matt Boyd
- Thomas Douglas as Ralph
- Michelle Glick as Janet Martinez
- Yuki Iwamoto as Buchou
- Mišel Matičević as Juri Müller (older)
- Clayton Nemrow as Warren Stuart
- Harry Szovik as Barman
- Christoph Tomanek as Manfred Kurt
- Mark Waschke as Carsten Schlüter (older)
- Lavinia Wilson as Lea Hauswirth
- Scott Alexander Young as Partner

== Episodes ==
No.	Title	Directed by	Written by	Original release date
1	"Episode 1"	Robert Thalheim	Oliver Ziegenbalg	October 7, 2021
2	"Episode 2"	Robert Thalheim	Oliver Ziegenbalg	October 7, 2021
3	"Episode 3"	Robert Thalheim	Oliver Ziegenbalg	October 7, 2021
4	"Episode 4"	Robert Thalheim	Oliver Ziegenbalg	October 7, 2021
