= Samsung Galaxy J2 Prime =

Android-based smartphone released by Samsung

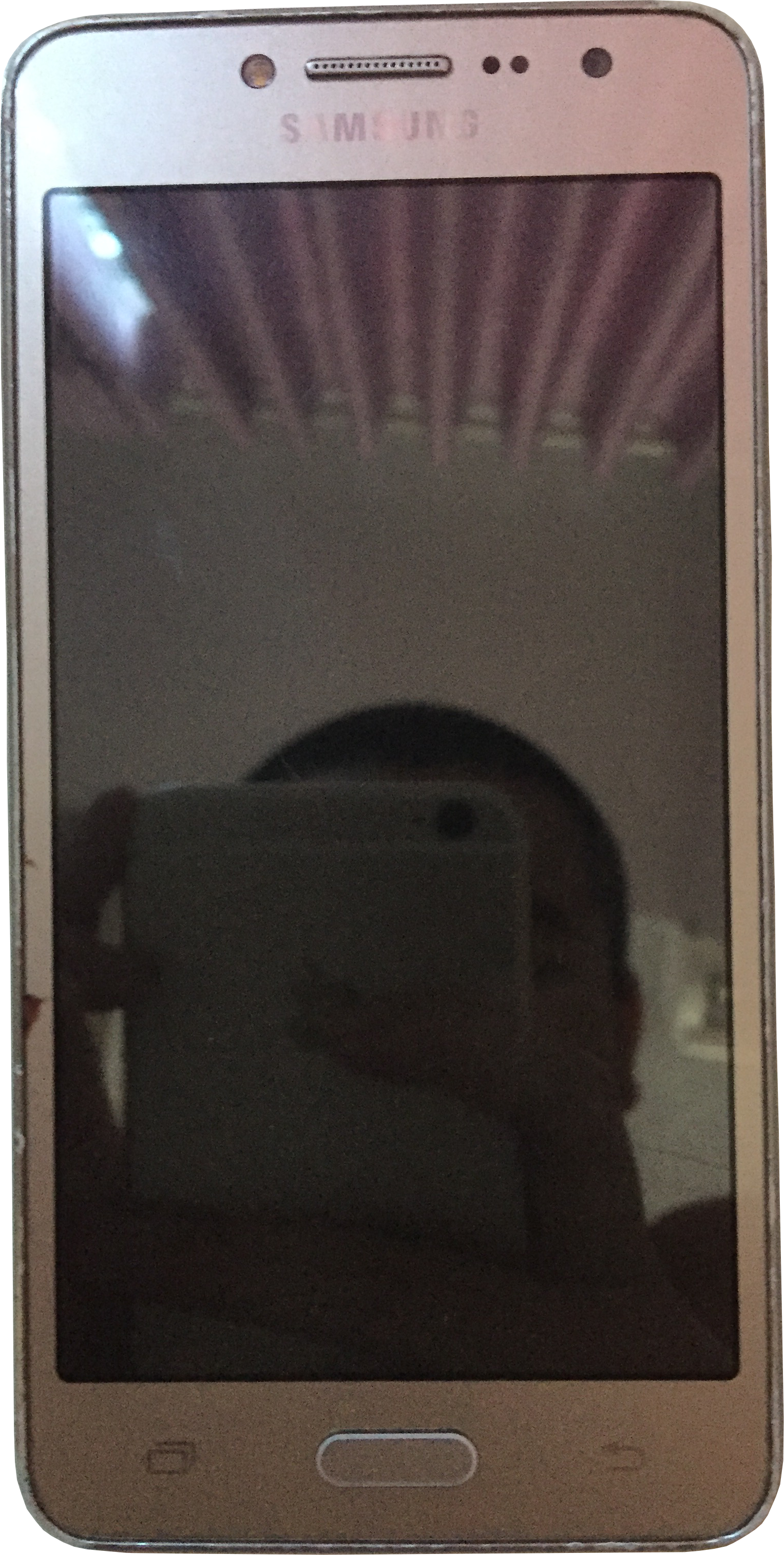
- Samsung Galaxy J2 Prime in Gold
- Manufacturer: Samsung Electronics
- Type: Smartphone
- Series: Galaxy J series Galaxy Grand series
- First released: November 2016
- Discontinued: 2018
- Predecessor: Samsung Galaxy J1 Ace; Samsung Galaxy Grand Prime
- Successor: Samsung Galaxy J2 (2018)
- Related: Samsung Galaxy J3 Prime; Samsung Galaxy J5 Prime; Samsung Galaxy J7 Prime
- Compatible networks: 2G GSM 850, 900, 1800, 1900; 3G HSDPA 850, 900, 1700, 1900, 2100; 4G LTE Bands 1, 2, 3, 4, 5, 7, 8, 17, 20, 28, 38, 40
- Form factor: Slate
- Colors: Black, Gold, Silver, Pink
- Dimensions: 144.8 mm (5.70 in) H 72.1 mm (2.84 in) W 8.9 mm (0.35 in) D
- Weight: 160 g (5.6 oz)
- Operating system: Android 6.0.1 "Marshmallow"; TouchWiz
- System-on-chip: MediaTek MT6737T
- CPU: Quad-core (4×1.4 GHz) ARM Cortex-A53
- GPU: ARM Mali-T720MP2
- Memory: 1.5 GB
- Storage: 8/16 GB
- Removable storage: microSD up to 256 GB
- Battery: 2600 mAh, removable
- Rear camera: 8 MP, f/2.2
- Front camera: 5 MP, f/2.2. Flash (SM-G532F)
- Display: 5.0", 540×960 px (220 ppi) PLS TFT
- Connectivity: WLAN 802.11b/g/n, Bluetooth 4.2, GPS/GLONASS, microUSB 2.0, 3.5 mm headphone jack
- Data inputs: Accelerometer, proximity sensor
- Model: SM-G532x (x varies by region and carrier)
- Other: FM radio, Dual SIM (Duos models only) USB On-The-Go (SM-G532F, SM-G532G) Digital TV (SBTVD (SM-G532MT))

The Samsung Galaxy J2 Prime (also known as Galaxy J2 Ace or Galaxy Grand Prime+) is an Android-based smartphone manufactured by Samsung Electronics. It was unveiled and released in November 2016.

This phone was never being sold officially in North America, Western and Central Europe, Japan, South Korea, Singapore and Australia.

== Specifications ==
=== Hardware ===
The J2 Prime is powered by a MediaTek MT6737T SoC including a quad-core 1.4 GHz ARM Cortex-A53 CPU, an ARM Mali-T720MP2 GPU and 1.5 GB RAM. The 8 GB internal storage can be upgraded up to 256 GB via microSD card.

The J2 Prime features a 5-inch PLS TFT with a 540×960 px resolution. It has an 8 megapixel main camera with f/2.2 aperture, LED flash and autofocus. The front camera is a 5 MP sensor with f/2.2 aperture and LED flash.

=== Software ===
The Galaxy J2 Prime is shipped with Android 6.0.1 "Marshmallow" and Samsung's TouchWiz user interface.

== See also ==
- Samsung Galaxy
- Samsung Galaxy J series

Preceded by Samsung Galaxy J2 (2016); Samsung Galaxy Grand Prime	Samsung Galaxy J2 Prime; 2016	Succeeded by Samsung Galaxy J2 (2017)
