= Samsung Galaxy J7 (2016) =

Samsung smartphone

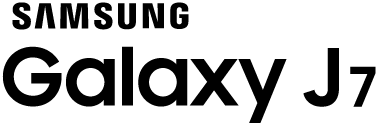

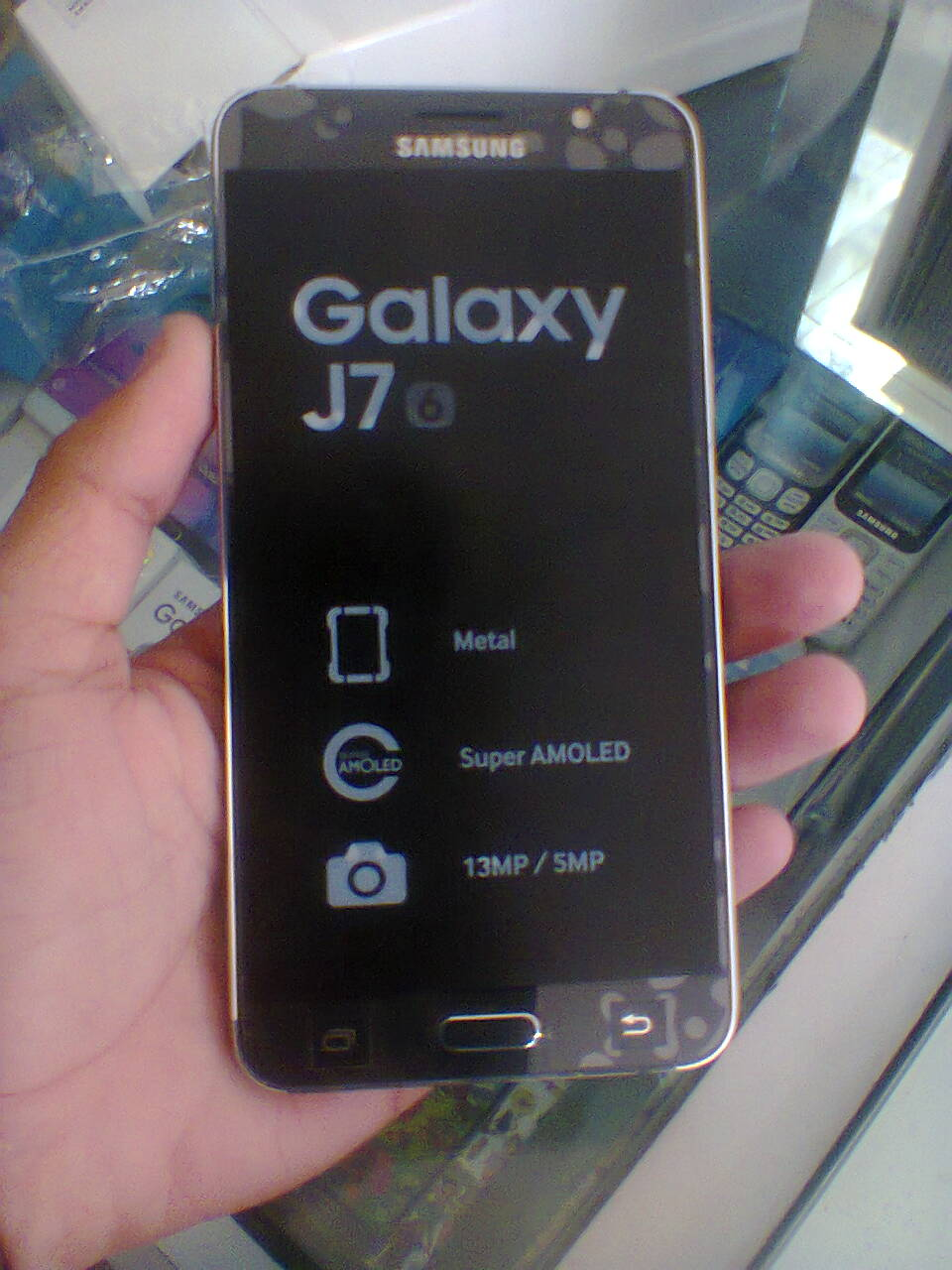
- Manufacturer: Samsung Electronics
- Type: Touchscreen smartphone
- Series: Galaxy J
- First released: April 2016
- Discontinued: 2018
- Predecessor: Samsung Galaxy J7
- Successor: Samsung Galaxy J7 (2017)
- Related: Samsung Galaxy On8; Samsung Galaxy J7 Prime; Samsung Galaxy J1 (2016); Samsung Galaxy J2 (2016); Samsung Galaxy J3 (2016); Samsung Galaxy J5 (2016)
- Compatible networks: (GSM/HSPA/LTE); 2G: GSM850, GSM900, DCS1800, PCS1900; 3G UMTS: B1 (2100), B2 (1900), B5 (850), B7 (2600), B8 (900); 4G FDD LTE: B1 (2100), B3 (1800), B4 (AWS), B5 (850), B7 (2600), B8 (900), B20 (800); 4G TDD LTE: B40 (2300)
- Form factor: Phablet
- Dimensions: 152.2 mm (6 in) H 78.7 mm (3.10 in) W 7.5 mm (0.30 in) D
- Weight: 173 g (6.03 oz)
- Operating system: Originally (China): Android 5.1.1 (Lollipop) with TouchWiz Noble UX; Originally (Global): Android 6.0.1 (Marshmallow) with TouchWiz Hero UX; Currently (China): Android 6.0.1 (Marshmallow) with TouchWiz Hero UX; Currently (Global): Android 8.1 (Oreo) with Samsung Experience 9.5
- System-on-chip: China Mobile: Samsung Exynos 7580; China Telecom: Qualcomm Snapdragon 617; Global: Samsung Exynos 7870
- Memory: China: 3 GB; Global: 2 GB
- Storage: 16 GB
- Removable storage: microSD up to 128 GB
- Battery: Li-Ion 3,300 mAh battery, removable
- Rear camera: 13 MP, 4128 x 3096 pixels, autofocus, touch focus, face detection, LED flash, geo-tagging, video: 1080p@30fps,
- Front camera: 5 megapixels (1080p) HD video recording @ 30 fps back-illuminated sensor, LED flash
- Display: 5.5 in (140 mm) 720 x 1280 pixels (267 ppi) Super AMOLED
- Connectivity: List: Wi-Fi: 802.11 b/g/n (2.4/5 GHz); Wi-Fi Direct; Wi-Fi hotspot; DLNA; GPS/GLONASS; Bluetooth 4.1; USB 2.0 (Micro-B port, USB charging) USB OTG; 3.50 mm (0.138 in) headphone jack; NFC (only in select models)

The Samsung Galaxy J7 (2016) is an Android-based mid-range smartphone produced by Samsung Electronics in 2016 and is either based on the Qualcomm Snapdragon 615 or Exynos 7870 chipset.

== Hardware ==
Interior of the phone

The Samsung Galaxy J7 comes with a removable back panel, metallic chrome diamond-designed frame and a metal-finish plastic back cover. On the front of the phone, there is a 5.5 inch screen with two capacitive buttons to switch between apps and a hardware home button just below the screen. Above the display, there is a 5-megapixel camera with an LED flash and a chrome grill covering the earpiece and sensors. It has a Samsung S5K3L2 CMOS image sensor. On the right edge of the phone, there is a power button and there are volume keys on the left edge of the phone. There is a 3.5mm headphone jack and a micro-USB port at the bottom of the device. On the backside of the device, there is a slot for a microSD card and 2 slots for SIM cards and NFC chips with a 3300mAh battery concealed under a plastic rear cover.

Samsung Galaxy J7 has a HD Super AMOLED display with a resolution of 720×1280. The screen comes with scratch resistant glass, which according to Samsung is equivalent to Corning's Gorilla Glass 3.

== Software ==
The Samsung Galaxy J7 (2016) comes with Android 6.0.1 Marshmallow and Samsung's TouchWiz user interface.

The phone then got an update to Android 7.0 Nougat with Samsung Experience 8.1.

In November 2018, the J7 (2016) got an update to Android 8.1.0 Oreo with Samsung Experience 9.5.

Preceded by Samsung Galaxy J7 (2015)	Samsung Galaxy J7 (2016)	Succeeded by Samsung Galaxy J7 (2017)
