= Samsung Galaxy Express =

Android smartphone by Samsung

- Samsung Galaxy Express GT-I8730
- Manufacturer: Samsung Electronics
- Series: Samsung Galaxy
- First released: March 2013; 13 years ago
- Availability by region: Europe and Asia
- Successor: Samsung Galaxy Express 2
- Compatible networks: 2G: GSM 850 / 900 / 1800 / 1900; 3G: HSDPA 850 / 900 / 2100; 4G: LTE 800 / 900 / 1800 / 2600
- Dimensions: 132.2×69.1×9.3 mm (5.20×2.72×0.37 in)
- Weight: 139.1g (4.90 oz)
- Operating system: Android 4.2.2 "Jelly Bean" Android 4.4.2 "kitkat"
- CPU: 1.2 GHz Dual-core Krait CPU
- GPU: Adreno 305 GPU
- Memory: 1 GB RAM
- Storage: 8 GB
- Removable storage: microSD up to 64 GB (Hot-swappable)
- Battery: 2000 mAh
- Rear camera: 5MP and 720p video recording
- Front camera: 1.3 MP
- Display: Super AMOLED Plus Non-PenTile RGB stripe, 4.5 inches, 800x480 resolution (~207 ppi)
- Connectivity: 4G, HSPA, Bluetooth 4.0+LE, Wi-Fi, Wi-Fi Hotspot, DLNA, Kies Air, USB 2.0 High-Speed, NFC, S Beam, MHL
- Data inputs: Multi-touch capacitive touchscreen, 3 push buttons, aGPS, Barometer, Gyroscope, Accelerometer
- Model: GT-I8730
- Other: AllShare, FM radio with RDS and FM recording, S Voice Online services Google Play, Samsung Apps

The Samsung Galaxy Express (GT-I8730) is a smartphone made by Samsung which was launched in March 2013 in India featuring a similar design to the Galaxy S Duos but with additional features such as 4G LTE, NFC. It also features a bigger 4.5-inch screen with Super AMOLED Plus and retains all the features which the Samsung Galaxy S III phone has.

== Features ==
=== Software and services ===
The Galaxy Express is powered by Android, a Linux-based, open source mobile operating system developed by Google and introduced commercially in 2008. Among other features, the software allows users to maintain customized home screens which can contain shortcuts to applications and widgets for displaying information. Four shortcuts to frequently used applications can be stored on a dock at the bottom of the screen; the button in the center of the dock opens the application drawer, which displays a menu containing all of the apps installed on the device. A tray accessed by dragging from the top of the screen allows users to view notifications received from other apps, and contains toggle switches for commonly used functions. Pre-loaded apps also provide access to Google's various services. The Galaxy Express uses Samsung's proprietary TouchWiz graphical user interface (GUI). The "Nature" version used by the Galaxy Express has a more "organic" feel than previous versions, and contains more interactive elements such as a water ripple effect on the lock screen. To complement the TouchWiz interface, and as a response to Apple's Siri, the phone includes the S Voice which is Samsung's version of an intelligent personal assistant. S Voice can recognize eight languages including English, Korean and French. Based on Vlingo, S Voice enables the user to verbally control 20 functions such as playing a song, setting the alarm, or activating driving mode; it relies on Wolfram Alpha for online searches.

The Galaxy Express comes with Android version 4.1.2, named "Jellybean", which employs Google Now, a voice-assistant similar to S Voice, and incorporates other software changes. An update to 4.2.2 Jellybean would soon be made available through Over-The-Air upgrade or through Samsung Kies.

The Galaxy Express comes with a multitude of pre-installed applications, including standard Android ones like YouTube, Google+, Voice Search, Google Play, Gmail, Map, and Calendar, in addition to Samsung-specific apps such as S Voice, ChatON, Game Hub, Video Hub, Social Hub and Navigation. The user is able to access Google Play, a digital-distribution multimedia-content service exclusive to Android, to download applications, movies, music, TV programs, games, books, and magazines.

The Galaxy Express can access and play traditional media formats such as music, movies, TV programs, audiobooks, and podcasts, and can sort its media library alphabetically by song title, artist, album, playlist, folder, and genre. It also includes Samsung's own proprietary music management and download application called "Music Hub", designed to compete with Apple's iTunes, iCloud, and iTunes Match services. Music Hub's music catalogue contains over 19 million songs.

The phone enables video calling with its 1.3 MP front-facing camera, and with support for the aptX codec, improves Bluetooth-headset connectivity. Texting on the Galaxy Express does not embody any new significant features from other Samsung Galaxy devices. Speech-to-text is aided by the Vlingo and Google's voice-recognition assistant. Not unlike other Android devices, there are a multitude of third-party typing applications available that could complement the Galaxy Express' stock keyboard.

=== Hardware and design ===
The Galaxy Express has a polycarbonate plastic chassis measuring 132.2 mm (5.20 in) long, 69.1 mm (2.72 in) wide, and 9.3 mm (0.37 in) thick, with the device weighing 139.1 grams (4.91 oz).The phone is available in two basic color options: "Marble White" and "Titanium Gray".

Internally, the Galaxy Express uses Qualcomm's Snapdragon 400 SoC featuring a dual-core 1.2 GHz Krait CPU and an Adreno 305 GPU.

The Galaxy Express has 1 GB of RAM which comes with 8 GB of internal storage, with a 64 GB version to be available internationally; additionally, microSDXC storage offers a further 32 GB for a potential total of 40 GB.

The Galaxy Express' HD Super AMOLED display measures 4.5 inches (110 mm) which comes with a 480×800-pixel resolution with a 207.1 pixel per inch (PPI, a measure of pixel density). The glass used for the display is the damage-resistant Corning Gorilla Glass 2.

The Galaxy Express has a 5-megapixel camera which can take 2,592×1,944 resolution photos and record videos in (720p) resolution. Samsung improved the camera's software over that of its predecessor to include zero shutter lag, and Burst Mode and Best Shot, which work together to quickly take numerous photos before the best-judged frame is selected. The phone can also take pictures while recording videos. The rear-facing camera is complemented by a 1.3-megapixel front-facing camera that can record 720p videos. The phone has LED flash and autofocus.

In addition to the 4.5-inch (110 mm) touchscreen, the Galaxy Express has several physical user inputs, including a home button located below the screen, a volume key on the left side and a power/lock key on the right. At the top there is a 3.5-millimetre (0.14 in) TRRS headphone jack and one of the two microphones on the Galaxy Express; the other is located below the home button.

The Galaxy Express' li-ion 2,000 mAh battery is said to have a 581-hour standby time or 11 hours of talk time on 3G, compared to 586 hours in standby and 19 hours of talk time on 2G. Built into the battery is near field communication connectivity, which allows users to share map directions and YouTube videos quickly using Wi-Fi Direct (through Android Beam), and perform non-touch payments at shops that employ specially equipped NFC cash registers. To help minimize battery consumption, Samsung has introduced "Smart Stay", an ability to track a user's eyes and turn off whenever the person is not looking at it. The battery can be wirelessly charged using a special charging pad (sold separately) that utilizes magnetic resonance to produce a magnetic field through which electricity could be transferred.
