= Terrorvision (disambiguation) =

Terrorvision or TerrorVision can refer to:

- Terrorvision, a British rock band
- TerrorVision, a 1986 horror-comedy movie.
- TerrorVision (album), a 2018 album by Belgian death metal band Aborted.

== See also ==
- Terravision, a mapping software
