= Samsung Galaxy J2 (2016) =

Smartphone model made by Samsung Electronics in 2016

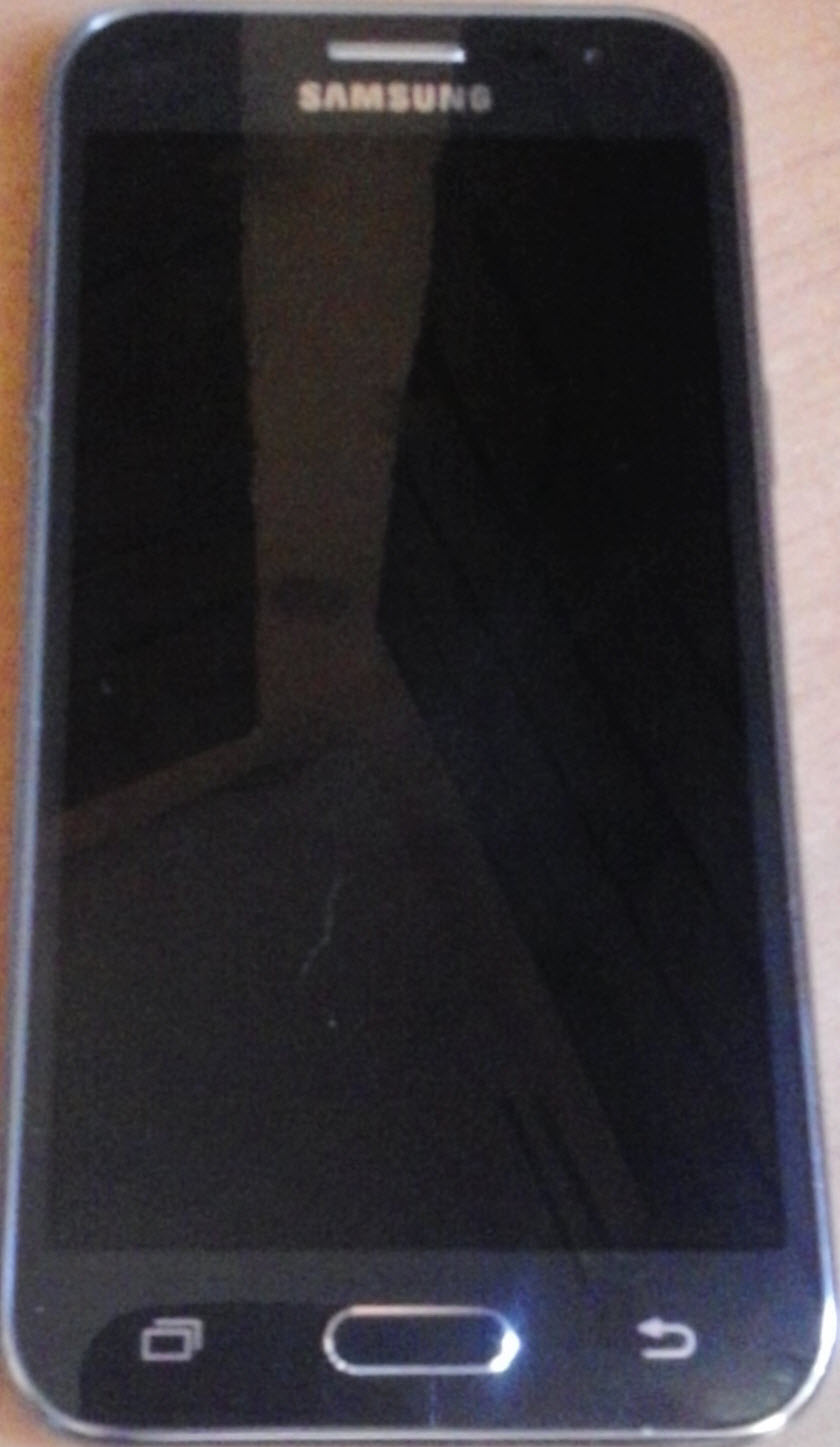
- Samsung Galaxy J2 (2016) in Black
- Manufacturer: Samsung Electronics
- Type: Smartphone
- Series: Galaxy J series
- First released: July 2016
- Predecessor: Samsung Galaxy J2
- Successor: Samsung Galaxy J2 (2018)
- Related: Samsung Galaxy J2 Prime; Samsung Galaxy J1 (2016); Samsung Galaxy J3 (2016); Samsung Galaxy J5 (2016); Samsung Galaxy J7 (2016)
- Compatible networks: 2G GSM 850, 900, 1800, 1900; 3G HSDPA 850, 900, 1900, 2100; 4G LTE Bands 1, 3, 5, 8, 20, 40
- Form factor: Slate
- Dimensions: 142.4 mm (5.61 in) H 71.1 mm (2.80 in) W 8 mm (0.31 in) D
- Weight: 138 g (4.9 oz)
- Operating system: Original: Android 5.1.1 "Lollipop"; TouchWiz; Current: Android 6.0.1 "Marshmallow"; TouchWiz
- System-on-chip: Spreadtrum SC8830
- CPU: Quad-core (4×1.5 GHz) ARM Cortex-A7
- GPU: ARM Mali-400 MP2
- Memory: 1.5 GB
- Storage: 8 GB
- Removable storage: microSD up to 256 GB
- Battery: 2600 mAh, Li-Ion, removable
- Charging: 5 W charger
- Rear camera: 8 MP, f/2.2, HDR
- Front camera: 5 MP, f/2.2
- Display: 5.0", 720×1280 px (294 ppi) Super AMOLED
- Connectivity: WLAN 802.11 b/g/n, Bluetooth 4.1, GPS/GLONASS, microUSB 2.0, 3.5 mm headphone jack
- Data inputs: Accelerometer, proximity sensor
- Model: SM-J210x (x varies by region and carrier)
- Other: FM radio, dual SIM (Duos models only)

The Samsung Galaxy J2 (2016) is an Android smartphone manufactured by Samsung Electronics. It was unveiled and released in July 2016.

== Specifications ==
=== Hardware ===
The Galaxy J2 (2016) is powered by a Spreadtrum SC8830 SoC including a quad-core 1.5 GHz ARM Cortex-A7 CPU, an ARM Mali-400MP2 GPU and 1.5 GB RAM. The 8 GB internal storage can be upgraded up to 256 GB via microSD card.

It features a 5.0-inch Super AMOLED display with a HD Ready (720×1280px) resolution. It has an 8 megapixels main camera with f/2.2 aperture, LED flash, autofocus and HDR; the front camera has 5 megapixels and f/2.2 aperture. A notification ring called Smart Glow is settled around the main camera.

=== Software ===
The Galaxy J2 (2016) is shipped with Android 5.1.1 "Lollipop" and Samsung's TouchWiz user interface.

== See also ==
- Samsung Galaxy
- Samsung Galaxy J series

Preceded by Samsung Galaxy J2	Samsung Galaxy J2 (2016); 2016	Succeeded by Samsung Galaxy J2 Prime Samsung Galaxy J2 Pro
