= Samsung Galaxy J7 (2017) =

2015 Android-based smartphone by Samsung Electronics

Samsung Galaxy J7 (2017)/Pro
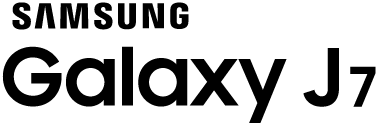

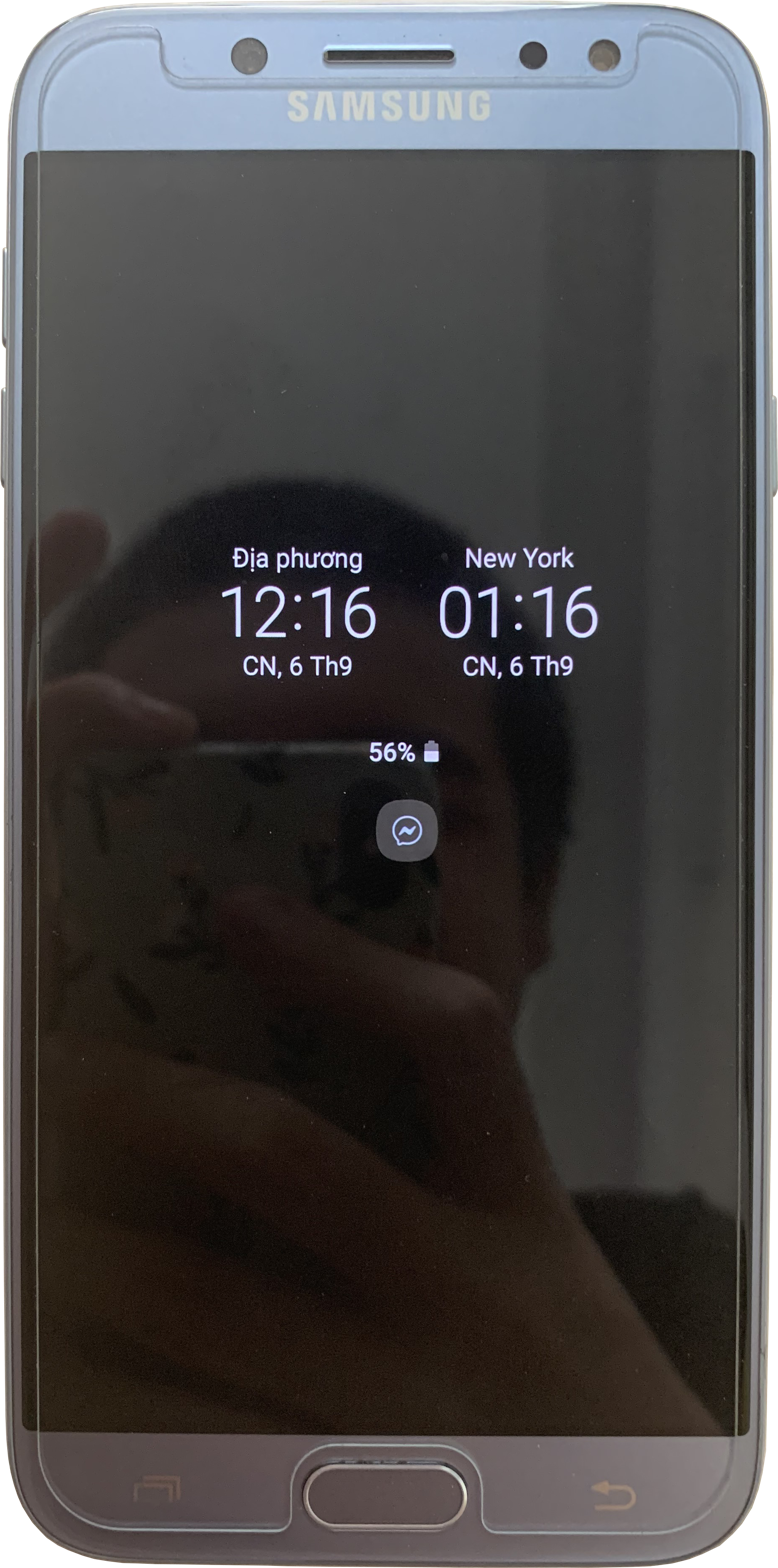
- Manufacturer: Samsung Electronics
- Type: Smartphone
- Series: Galaxy J series
- First released: June 2017
- Discontinued: 2018
- Predecessor: Samsung Galaxy J7 (2016); Samsung Galaxy J7 Prime
- Successor: Samsung Galaxy J8
- Related: Samsung Galaxy J7 Max
- Compatible networks: 2G GSM 850, 900, 1800, 1900; 3G HSDPA 850, 900, 1900, 2100; 4G LTE Bands 1, 3, 5, 7, 8, 20
- Form factor: Slate
- Dimensions: 152.5 mm (6.00 in) H 74.8 mm (2.94 in) W 8 mm (0.31 in) D
- Weight: 181 g (6.4 oz)
- Operating system: Original: Android 7.0 "Nougat"; Samsung Experience; Current: Android 9 "Pie"; One UI
- CPU: Octa-core (8×1.6 GHz) ARM Cortex-A53
- GPU: ARM Mali-T830MP2
- Memory: 3 GB
- Storage: 16, 32, 64 GB
- Removable storage: microSD up to 256 GB
- Battery: 3600 mAh
- Rear camera: 13 MP, autofocus, LED flash
- Front camera: 13 MP, 1080p@30fps video, LED flash
- Display: 5.5", 1080 × 1920 px (401 ppi) Super AMOLED
- Connectivity: Wi-Fi 802.11 a/b/g/n/ac, GPS/GLONASS, NFC, Bluetooth 4.1, microUSB 2.0, 3.5 mm headphone jack
- Model: SM-J730x (x varies by carrier and region)
- Website: Galaxy J7 Pro (archived)

The Samsung Galaxy J7 (2017) (also known as the Samsung Galaxy J7 Pro) is an Android-based smartphone produced, released and marketed by Samsung Electronics. It was unveiled and released in June 2017 along with the Samsung Galaxy J3 (2017). It is the successor to the Samsung Galaxy J7 (2016).

== Specifications ==
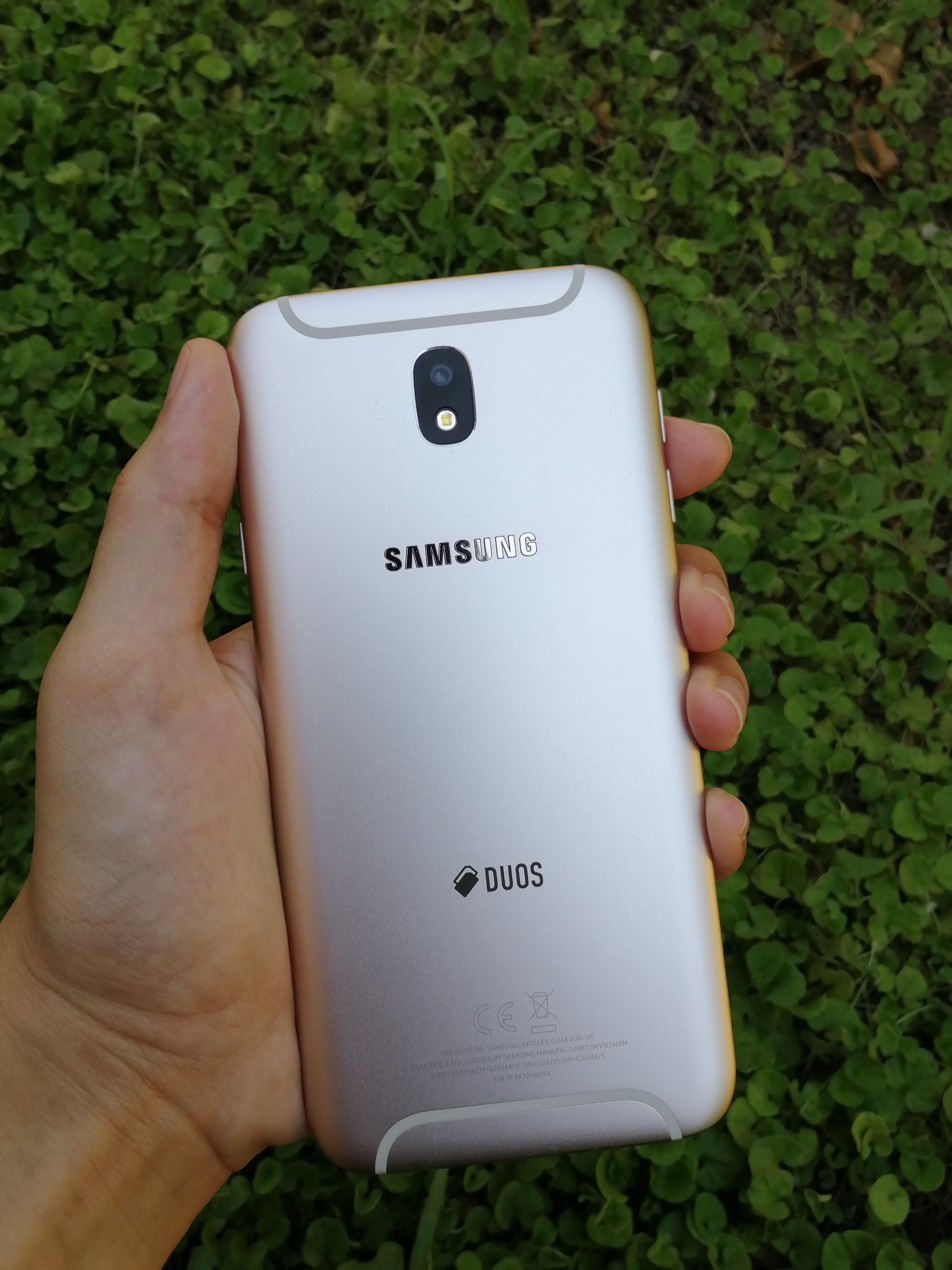
Backside showing the full metal design (gold)

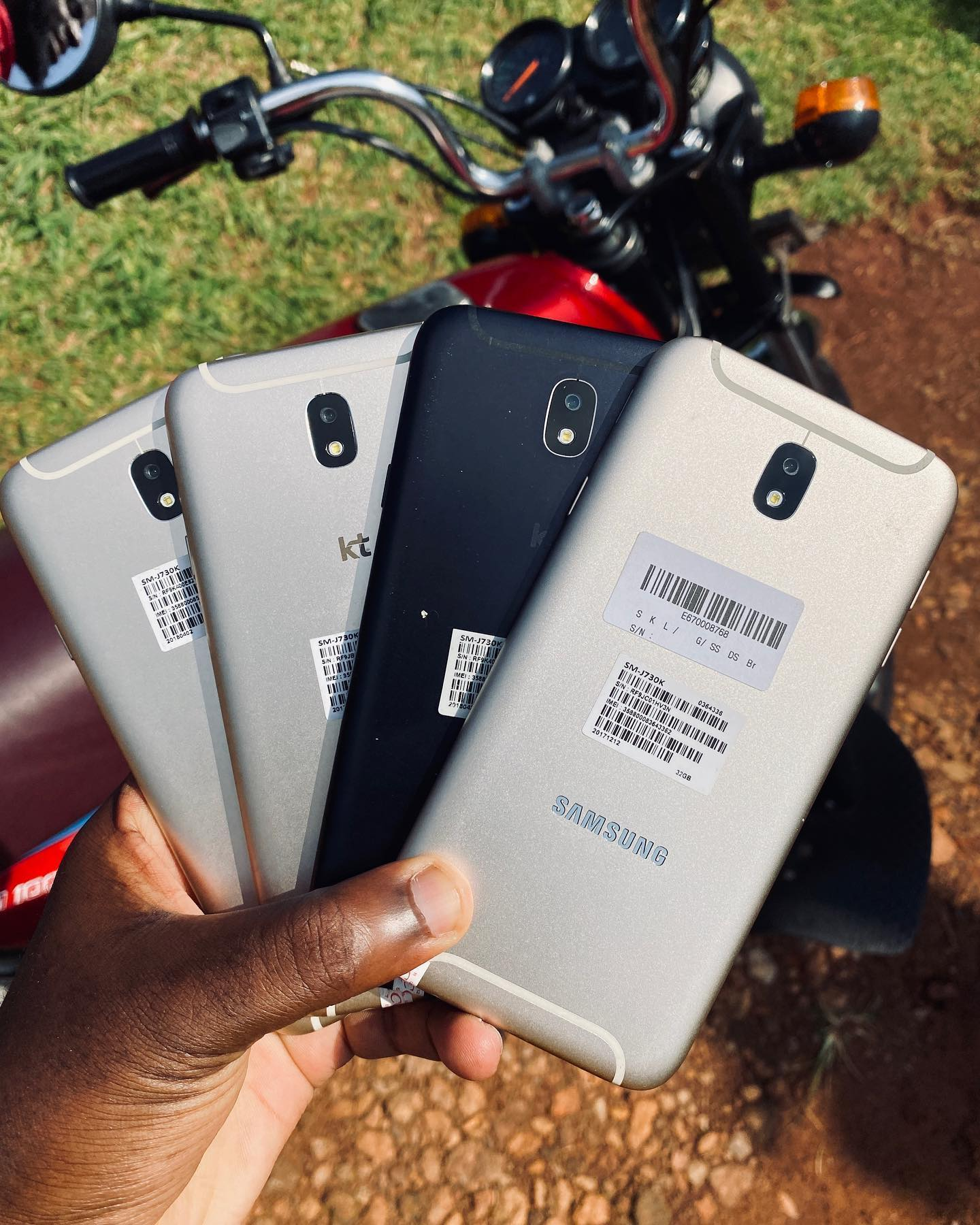
Samsung Galaxy J7 Pro (black – gold)

=== Hardware ===
The J7 is powered by an Exynos 7870 SoC including a 1.6 GHz octa-core ARM Cortex-A53 CPU, a Mali-T830MP1 GPU and 3 GB of RAM. It ships with either 16, 32 or 64 GB of internal storage which is expandable up to 256 GB with microSD card. The phone also introduces the 2nd J series phone (after the J5 (2017) to have a fingerprint sensor and Samsung Pay.

It is fitted with a 5.5-inch Full HD Super AMOLED screen featuring always-on-functionality and a 3600 mAh Li-ion battery.

=== Software ===
The J7 originally shipped with Android 7.0 "Nougat" with Samsung's Experience 8 user interface, and can be upgraded to 9 "Pie" with One UI 1.1. It supports VoLTE with dual SIM enabled 4G. It also supports Samsung Knox and Samsung Pay.

== See also ==
- Samsung Galaxy
- Samsung Galaxy J series

Preceded by Samsung Galaxy J7 (2016)	Samsung Galaxy J7 (2017); 2017	Succeeded by Samsung Galaxy J8
