= Wi-Fi hotspot =

Wi-Fi access point

A diagram showing a Wi-Fi network

A hotspot is a physical location where people can obtain Internet access, typically using Wi-Fi technology, via a wireless local-area network (WLAN) using a router connected to an Internet service provider.

Public hotspots may be created by a business for use by customers, such as coffee shops or hotels. Public hotspots are typically created from wireless access points configured to provide Internet access, controlled to some degree by the venue. In its simplest form, venues that have broadband Internet access can create public wireless access by configuring an access point (AP), in conjunction with a router to connect the AP to the Internet. A single wireless router combining these functions may suffice.

A private hotspot, often called tethering, may be configured on a smartphone or tablet that has a network data plan, to allow Internet access to other devices via password, Bluetooth pairing, or through the moeex protocol over USB, or even when both the hotspot device and the device[s] accessing it are connected to the same Wi-Fi network but one which does not provide Internet access. Similarly, a Bluetooth connection or USB OTG can be used by a mobile device to provide Internet access via Wi-Fi instead of a mobile network, to a device that itself has neither Wi-Fi nor mobile network capability passwords.

== Uses ==
The public can use a laptop or other suitable portable device to access the wireless connection (usually Wi-Fi) provided. The iPass 2014 interactive map, that shows data provided by the analysts Maravedis Rethink, shows that in December 2014 there are 46,000,000 hotspots worldwide and more than 22,000,000 roamable hotspots. More than 10,900 hotspots are on trains, planes and airports (Wi-Fi in motion) and more than 8,500,000 are "branded" hotspots (retail, cafés, hotels). The region with the largest number of public hotspots is Europe, followed by North America and Asia.

Libraries throughout the United States are implementing hotspot lending programs to extend access to online library services to users at home who cannot afford in-home Internet access or do not have access to Internet infrastructure. The New York Public Library was the largest program, lending out 10,000 devices to library patrons. Similar programs have existed in Kansas, Maine, and Oklahoma; and many individual libraries are implementing these programs.

Wi-Fi positioning is a method for geolocation based on the positions of nearby hotspots.

== Security issues ==
Security is a serious concern in connection with public and private hotspots. There are three possible attack scenarios. First, there is the wireless connection between the client and the access point, which needs to be encrypted so that the connection cannot be eavesdropped or attacked by a man-in-the-middle attack. Second, there is the hotspot itself. The WLAN encryption ends at the interface, then travels its network stack unencrypted and then, third, travels over the wired connection up to the BRAS of the ISP.

Depending upon the setup of a public hotspot, the provider of the hotspot has access to the metadata and content accessed by users of the hotspot. The safest method when accessing the Internet over a hotspot, with unknown security measures, is end-to-end encryption. Examples of strong end-to-end encryption are HTTPS and SSH.

Some hotspots authenticate users; however, this does not prevent users from viewing network traffic using packet sniffers.

Some vendors provide a download option that deploys WPA support. This conflicts with enterprise configurations that have solutions specific to their internal WLAN.

The Opportunistic Wireless Encryption (OWE) standard provides encrypted communication in open Wi-Fi networks, alongside the WPA3 standard, but is not yet widely implemented.

== Unintended consequences ==
New York City introduced a Wi-Fi hotspot kiosk called LinkNYC with the intentions of providing modern technology for the masses as a replacement to a payphone. Businesses complained they were a homeless magnet and CBS news observed transients with wires connected to the kiosk lingering for an extended period. It was shut down following complaints about transient activity around the station and encampments forming around it. Homeless were the most frequent users of the kiosk since its installation in early 2016 spurring complaints about public viewing of pornography and masturbation.

== Locations ==
Public hotspots are often found at airports, bookstores, coffee shops, department stores, fuel stations, hotels, hospitals, libraries, public pay phones, restaurants, RV parks and campgrounds, supermarkets, train stations, and other public places. Additionally, many schools and universities have wireless networks on their campuses.

== Types ==
=== Free hotspots ===
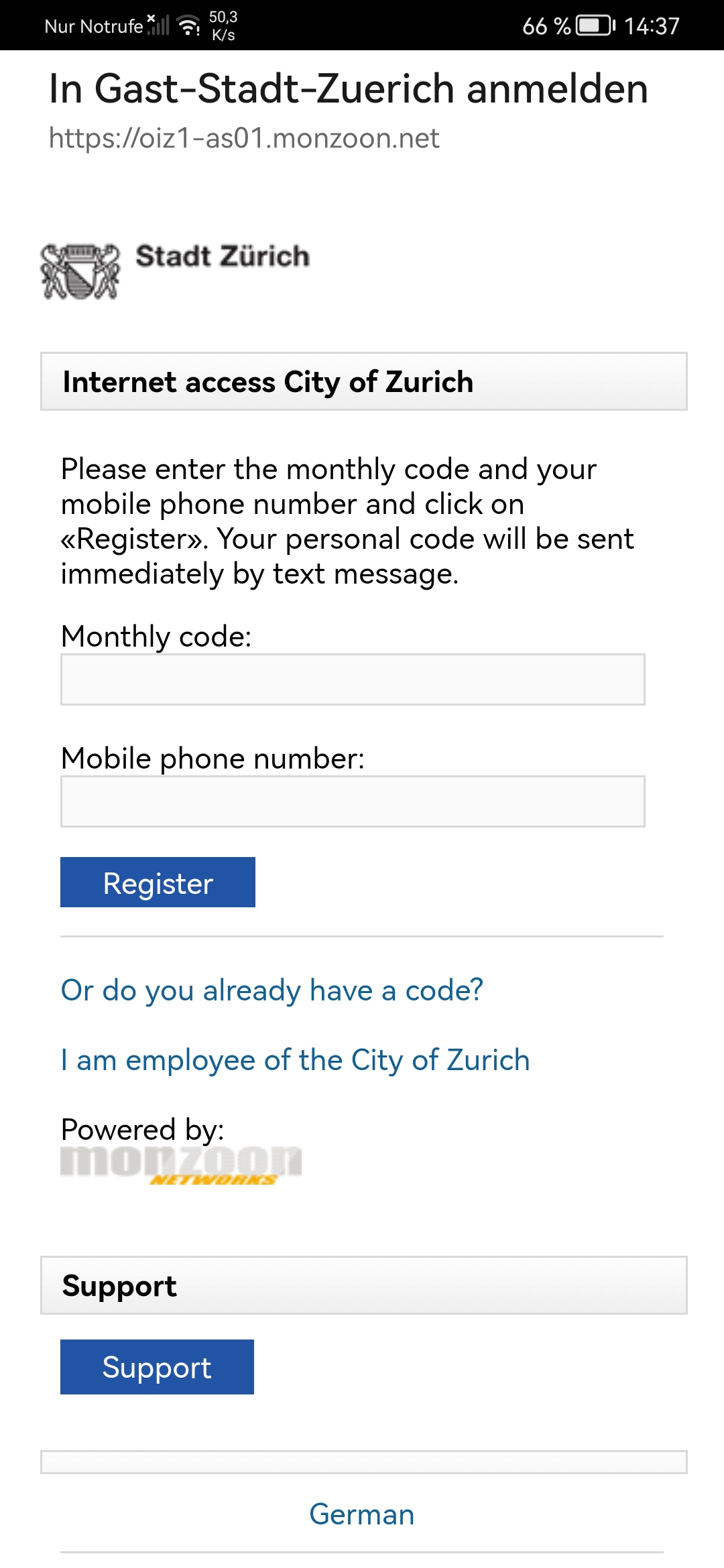
Public Wi-Fi hotspot in Zürich

According to statista.com, in the year 2022, there are approximately 550 million free Wi-Fi hotspots around the world. The U.S. NSA warns against connecting to free public Wi-Fi.

Free hotspots operate in two ways:

- Using an open public network is the easiest way to create a free hotspot. All that is needed is a Wi-Fi router. Similarly, when users of private wireless routers turn off their authentication requirements, opening their connection, intentionally or not, they permit piggybacking (sharing) by anyone in range.
- Closed public networks use a HotSpot Management System to control access to hotspots. This software runs on the router itself or an external computer allowing operators to authorize only specific users to access the Internet. Providers of such hotspots often associate the free access with a menu, membership, or purchase limit. Operators may also limit each user's available bandwidth (upload and download speed) to ensure that everyone gets a good quality service. Often this is done through service-level agreements.

=== Commercial hotspots ===
A commercial hotspot may feature:

- A captive portal, login screen or splash page that users are redirected to for authentication or payment. The captive portal or splash page sometimes includes the social login buttons.
- A payment option using a credit card, iPass, PayPal, or another payment service (voucher-based Wi-Fi)
- A walled garden feature that allows free access to certain sites
- Service-oriented provisioning to allow for improved revenue
- Data analytics and data capture tools, to analyze and export data from Wi-Fi clients

Many services provide payment services to hotspot providers, for a monthly fee or commission from the end-user income. For example, Amazingports can be used to set up hotspots that intend to offer both fee-based and free internet access, and ZoneCD is a Linux distribution that provides payment services for hotspot providers who wish to deploy their own service.

Roaming services are expanding among major hotspot Internet service providers. With roaming service, the users of a commercial provider can have access to other providers' hotspots, either free of charge or for extra fees, which users will usually be charged on an access-per-minute basis.

=== Software hotspots ===
Many Wi-Fi adapters built into or easily added to consumer computers and mobile devices include the functionality to operate as private or mobile hotspots, sometimes referred to as "mi-fi". The use of a private hotspot to enable other personal devices to access the WAN (usually but not always the Internet) is a form of bridging, and known as tethering. Manufacturers and firmware creators can enable this functionality in Wi-Fi devices on many Wi-Fi devices, depending upon the capabilities of the hardware, and most modern consumer operating systems, including Android, Apple OS X 10.6 and later, Windows, and Linux include features to support this. Additionally wireless chipset manufacturers such as Atheros, Broadcom, Intel and others, may add the capability for certain Wi-Fi NICs, usually used in a client role, to also be used for hotspot purposes. However, some service providers, such as AT&T, Sprint, and T-Mobile charge users for this service or prohibit and disconnect user connections if tethering is detected.

Third-party software vendors offer applications to allow users to operate their own hotspot, whether to access the Internet when on the go, share an existing connection, or extend the range of another hotspot.

=== Hotspot 2.0 ===
Hotspot 2.0, also known as HS2 and Wi-Fi Certified Passpoint, is an approach to public access Wi-Fi by the Wi-Fi Alliance. The idea is for mobile devices to automatically join a Wi-Fi subscriber service whenever the user enters a Hotspot 2.0 area, in order to provide better bandwidth and services-on-demand to end-users and relieve carrier infrastructure of some traffic.

Hotspot 2.0 is based on the IEEE 802.11u standard, which is a set of protocols published in 2011 to enable cellular-like roaming. If the device supports 802.11u and is subscribed to a Hotspot 2.0 service it will automatically connect and roam.

==== Supported devices ====
- Apple mobile devices running iOS 7 and up
- Some Samsung Galaxy smartphones
- Windows 10 devices have full support for network discovery and connection.
- Windows 8 and Windows 8.1 lack network discovery, but support connecting to a network when the credentials are known.

== Billing ==
EDCF user-priority list
		Net traffic					
		low			high		
		Audio	Video	Data	Audio	Video	Data
User needs	time-critical	7	5	0	6	4	0
User needs	not time-critical	-	-	2	-	-	2

The "user-fairness model" is a dynamic billing model, which allows volume-based billing, charged only by the amount of payload (data, video, audio). Moreover, the tariff is classified by net traffic and user needs.

If the net traffic increases, then the user has to pay the next higher tariff class. The user can be prompted to confirm that they want to continue the session in the higher traffic class. A higher class fare can also be charged for delay sensitive applications such as video and audio, versus non time-critical applications such as reading Web pages and sending e-mail.

Tariff classes of the user-fairness model
		Net traffic	
		low	high
User needs	time-critical	standard	exclusive
User needs	not time-critical	low priced	standard

The "User-fairness model" can be implemented with the help of EDCF (IEEE 802.11e). An EDCF user priority list shares the traffic in 3 access categories (data, video, audio) and user priorities (UP).

- Data [UP 0|2]
- Video [UP 5|4]
- Audio [UP 7|6]

See Service-oriented provisioning for viable implementations.

== Legal issues ==
Depending upon the set up of a public hotspot, the provider of the hotspot has access to the metadata and content accessed by users of the hotspot, and may have legal obligations related to privacy requirements and liability for use of the hotspot for unlawful purposes. In countries where the internet is regulated or freedom of speech more restricted, there may be requirements such as licensing, logging, or recording of user information. Concerns may also relate to child safety, and social issues such as exposure to objectionable content, protection against cyberbullying and illegal behaviours, and prevention of perpetration of such behaviors by hotspot users themselves.

=== European Union ===
The Data Retention Directive which required hotspot owners to retain key user statistics for 12 months was annulled by the Court of Justice of the European Union in 2014. The Directive on Privacy and Electronic Communications was replaced in 2018 by the General Data Protection Regulation, which imposes restrictions on data collection by hotspot operators.

=== United Kingdom ===
- Data Protection Act 1998: The hotspot owner must retain individual's information within the confines of the law.
- Digital Economy Act 2010 :^{[39]} Deals with, among other things, copyright infringement, and imposes fines of up to £250,000 for contravention.

== History ==
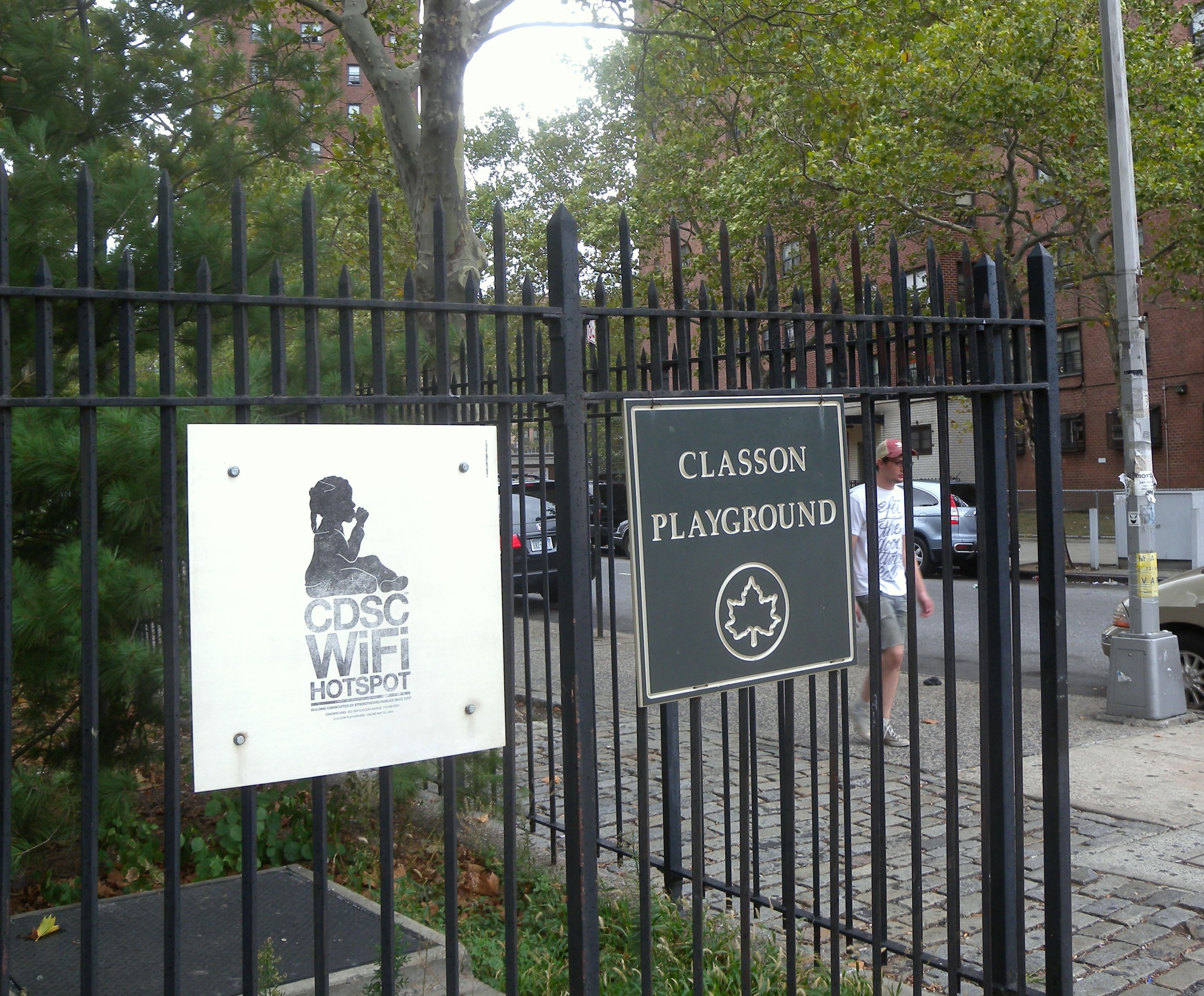
Public park in Brooklyn, New York has free Wi-Fi from a local corporation.

Public access wireless local area networks (LANs) were first proposed by Brett Stewart at the NetWorld+Interop conference in The Moscone Center in San Francisco in August 1993. Stewart did not use the term "hotspot" but referred to publicly accessible wireless LANs.

The first commercial venture to attempt to create a public local area access network was a firm founded in Richardson, Texas known as PLANCOM (Public Local Area Network Communications). The founders of the venture, Mark Goode, Greg Jackson, and Brett Stewart dissolved the firm in 1998, while Goode and Jackson created MobileStar Networks. The firm was one of the first to sign such public access locations as Starbucks, American Airlines, and Hilton Hotels. The company was sold to Deutsche Telecom in 2001, who then converted the name of the firm into "T-Mobile Hotspot". It was then that the term "hotspot" entered the popular vernacular as a reference to a location where a publicly accessible wireless LAN is available.

ABI Research reported there was a total of 4.9 million global Wi-Fi hotspots in 2012. In 2016 the Wireless Broadband Alliance predicted a steady annual increase from 5.2m public hotspots in 2012 to 10.5m in 2018.

== See also ==
- Bluetooth
- Evil twin (wireless networks)
- Hotspot gateway
- IEEE 802.11
- Legality of piggybacking
- LinkNYC
- MobileStar
- Securing Adolescents From Exploitation-Online Act
- Visitor Based Network
- Wireless LAN
- Wireless security
- Wi-Fi Direct
