= Securing Adolescents from Exploitation-Online Act of 2007 =

The Securing Adolescents From Exploitation-Online Act of 2007 (H.R. 3791) is a U.S. House bill stating that anyone offering an open Wi-Fi Internet connection to the public, who "obtains actual knowledge of any facts or circumstances" in relation to illegal visual media such as "child pornography" transferred over that connection, must register a report of their knowledge to the National Center for Missing and Exploited Children. The act references US Code sections 2251, 2251A, 2252, 2252A, 2252B, 2260, and 1466A in defining its scope. Anyone failing to report their knowledge faces fines of up to $300,000. It was written by Nick Lampson (D-TX) and introduced in the House of Representatives on October 10, 2007. It was approved (409–2–20) on December 5, 2007, with only Republicans Ron Paul and Paul Broun voting against. Some commentators criticized it as overly broad, but Lampson's spokesman dismissed these interpretations, saying that the act was not intended to cover Americans who had wireless routers at home, but only to target their internet service providers.
