= Samsung Galaxy J1 (2016) =

Android smartphone by Samsung

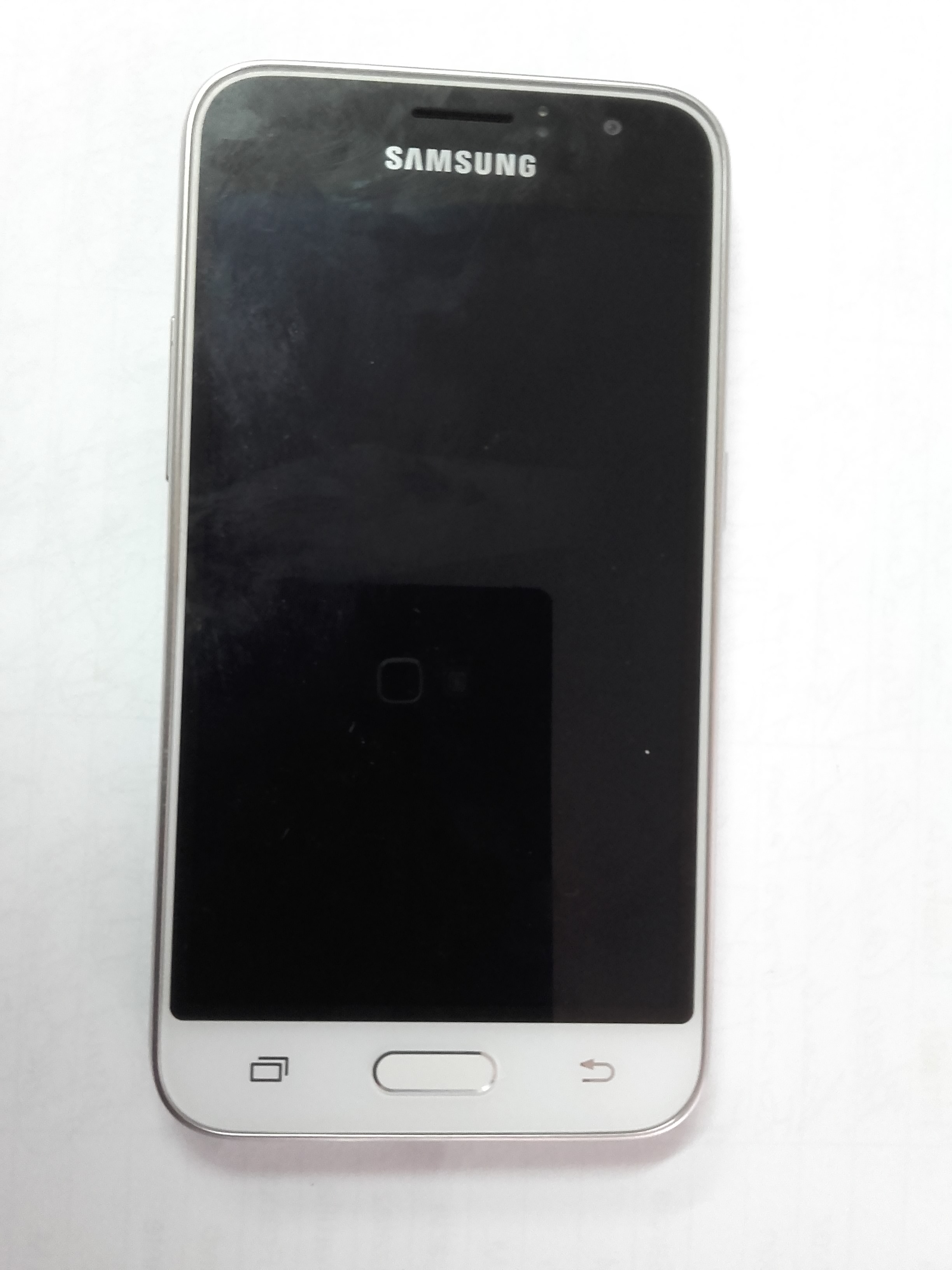
- Samsung Galaxy J1 (2016) in White
- Manufacturer: Samsung Electronics
- Type: Smartphone
- Series: Galaxy J series
- First released: January 13, 2016; 10 years ago
- Discontinued: 2018
- Predecessor: Samsung Galaxy J1; Samsung Galaxy J1 Ace; Samsung Galaxy Express 2
- Successor: Samsung Galaxy J1 (2017)
- Related: Samsung Galaxy J1 Nxt; Samsung Galaxy J2 (2016); Samsung Galaxy J3 (2016); Samsung Galaxy J5 (2016); Samsung Galaxy J7 (2016)
- Compatible networks: 2G GSM 850, 900, 1800, 1900; 3G HSDPA 850, 900, 1900, 2100; 4G LTE Bands 1, 2, 3, 4, 5, 7, 8, 12, 20
- Form factor: Slate
- Dimensions: 132.6 mm (5.22 in) H 69.3 mm (2.73 in) W 8.9 mm (0.35 in) D
- Weight: 131 g (4.6 oz)
- Operating system: Android 5.1.1 "Lollipop"; TouchWiz; upgradable up to Android 6.0.1 "Marshmallow", remaining with the same TouchWiz UI. Unofficially: Android 10 by LineageOS 17.1
- System-on-chip: Speadtrum SC9830 (SM-J120H/M etc...) | Exynos 3475 (SM-J120F/FN etc...)
- CPU: Quad-core (4×1.3 GHz) ARM Cortex-A7
- GPU: ARM Mali-400
- Memory: 1 GB
- Storage: 8 GB
- Removable storage: microSD up to 256 GB
- Battery: 2050 mAh
- Rear camera: 5 MP f/2.2
- Front camera: 2 MP f/2.2
- Display: 4.5", 480×800 px, Super AMOLED
- Connectivity: Wi-Fi 802.11 b/g/n, Bluetooth 4.1, GPS/GLONASS, microUSB 2.0
- Data inputs: Accelerometer, Proximity sensor
- Model: SM-J120x (x varies by country and carrier)
- Other: FM radio, Dual SIM (Duos models only)
- Website: J1 (2016)

The Samsung Galaxy J1 (2016) (also called Galaxy Express 3 and Galaxy Amp 2) is an Android smartphone developed by Samsung Electronics and was released in January 2016.

== Specifications ==
=== Hardware ===
The J1 (2016) has a 4.5 inch Super AMOLED display. The 3G model is powered by an Speadtrum SC9830 SoC featuring a quad-core 1.3 GHz ARM Cortex-A7 CPU with 1 GB of RAM. It has 8 GB internal storage, Dual SIM functionality is not a for Dual models. There is also a LTE variant with the Exynos 3475 SoC with the same Cortex-A7 CPU as the 3G variant, although it has a slightly more powerful Mali-T720 GPU.

=== Software ===
The J1 (2016) is shipped with Android 5.1.1 "Lollipop" and Samsung's TouchWiz user interface. It later got an update to Android 6.0.1 "Marshmallow" with the same TouchWiz user interface. Also available are Custom ROMs, for example LineageOS 17.1 (Android 10 "Q"), although it got some unstable ROMs up to Android 12.

== See also ==
- Samsung Galaxy
- Samsung Galaxy J series
