= Samsung Galaxy Grand Prime =

Smartphone model

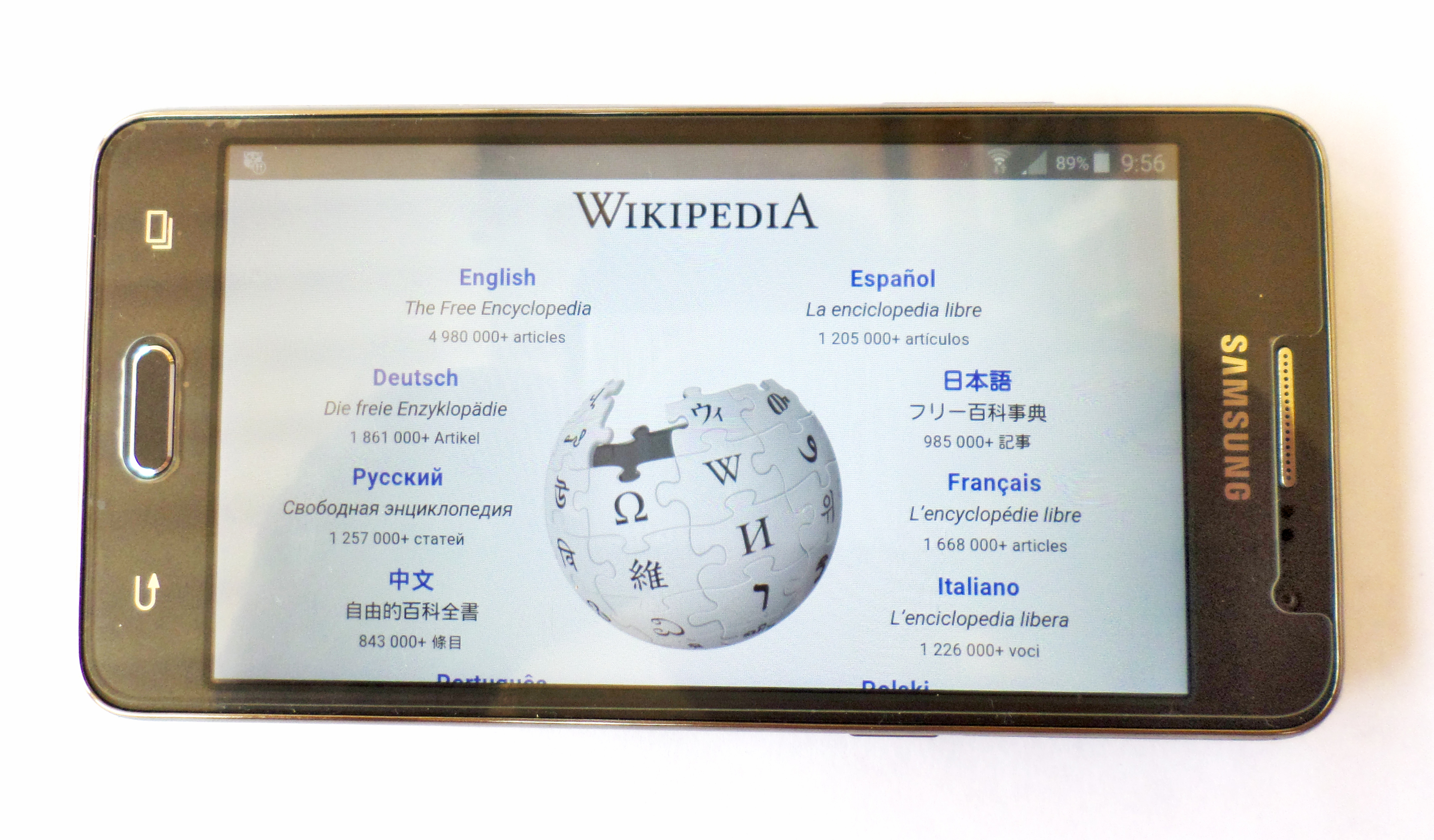
- Displaying the home page of Wikipedia
- Brand: Samsung
- Manufacturer: Samsung Electronics
- Type: Touchscreen smartphone
- Series: Samsung Galaxy
- First released: October 2014
- Discontinued: June 2017
- Predecessor: Samsung Galaxy Core Prime; Samsung Galaxy Grand 2
- Successor: Samsung Galaxy J2 Prime/Grand Prime+
- Related: Samsung Galaxy On5; Samsung Galaxy On7
- Compatible networks: (GSM/GPRS/EDGE): 850, 900, 1800 and 1900 MHz; 3G (HSPA 42.2/5.76 Mbit/s): HSDPA 850, 900, 1900 and 2100 MHz; 4G LTE (Cat4 150/50 Mbit/s): 700, 800, 850, 900, 1700, 1800, 1900, 2100 and 2600 MHz
- Form factor: Slate
- Dimensions: 144.8 mm (5.70 in) H 72.1 mm (2.84 in) W 8.6 mm (0.34 in) D
- Weight: 156 g (5.5 oz)
- Operating system: Original: Android 4.4.4 "KitKat"; Android 5.0-5.1.1 "Lollipop" (Value Edition variants); Current: Android 5.1.1 "Lollipop"; Unofficial: up to Android 11 via LineageOS 18.1
- System-on-chip: Qualcomm Snapdragon MSM8916 410; Marvell PXA1908 (Value Edition LTE); Spreadtrum SC7730 (SM-G531Y, SM-G531H/DS)
- CPU: ARMv8 1.2 GHz Quad-core CPU; ARMv7 1.3 GHz Quad-core CPU (SM-G531Y)
- GPU: Adreno 306; Vivante GC7000UL (Value Edition); Mali-400 MP (SM-G531Y)
- Memory: 1 GB RAM
- Storage: 8 GB
- Removable storage: microSD, microSDXC up to 256 GB
- Battery: 2600 mAh Li-ion
- Rear camera: 8 Megapixel with LED flash
- Front camera: 5 Megapixel
- Display: 5.0 in (130 mm) 540x960 px (220dpi)
- Connectivity: Wi-Fi 802.11a/b/g/n (2.4 GHz); GPS; Bluetooth LE 4.0 with ANT+ Bluetooth 4.1 with A2DP (G531F); NFC (G530F/FZ; G531F)
- Data inputs: Accelerometer; Proximity sensor Geomagnetic sensor Compass
- Model: SM-G530H/DS (Dual SIM variant); SM-G530F (LTE variant); SM-G530BT (Brazilian variant); SM-G530FZ; SM-G530M; SM-G531F (Value Edition LTE); SM-G531H/DL (Value Edition Dual SIM); SM-G531BT (Brazilian variant; SBTVD Dual SIM variant); SM-G531F/DD (Value Edition LTE Dual SIM); SM-G531Y (Value Edition)
- Codename: fortuna grandprimeve
- SAR: 0.412 W/kg (Head SAR); 0.382 W/kg (Body-worn SAR)
- Other: Digital TV (SBTVD (SM-G530BT; SM-G531BT); USB On-The-Go (SM-G531F)
- Website: Official Website

The Samsung Galaxy Grand Prime is an entry-level Android smartphone manufactured and marketed by Samsung Electronics. The Grand Prime line served as a successor to the Core Prime line in 2015.

It was originally introduced in October 2014, exclusively for Indian and Pakistani markets, and the following year as a budget phone in a number of markets in Asia. It was also made available in the United States through mobile providers such as MetroPCS, Cricket, Verizon, T-Mobile and Sprint. In Canada, it was served by Freedom Mobile, Chatr Mobile, Koodo, SpeakOut and Public Mobile.

In 2016, Samsung announced that it released the successor to the Grand Prime. It was launched as the Samsung Galaxy Grand Prime Plus, known as the J2 Prime in some territories.

== Hardware ==
The Samsung Galaxy Grand Prime comprises:

- ARMv8 1.2 gigahertz quad-core central processing unit
- Eight gigabytes of storage
- One gigabyte of random-access memory
- 2600 milliampere-hour lithium-ion battery
- MicroSD slot
- Adreno 306 Vivante GC7000UL (Value Edition)
- SIM card slot
- Eight megapixel rear camera with light emitting diode flash
- Five megapixel front camera

== Features ==
The Galaxy Grand Prime runs Android and comes with Android KitKat, however it can be upgraded to Android Lollipop. It has a five-inch touchscreen display with 540x960 resolution, a 3.5mm headphone jack and a micro-USB port for battery charging and data transfer.
