= Futurium =

Museum in Berlin

Coordinates: 52.5241°N 13.3743°E

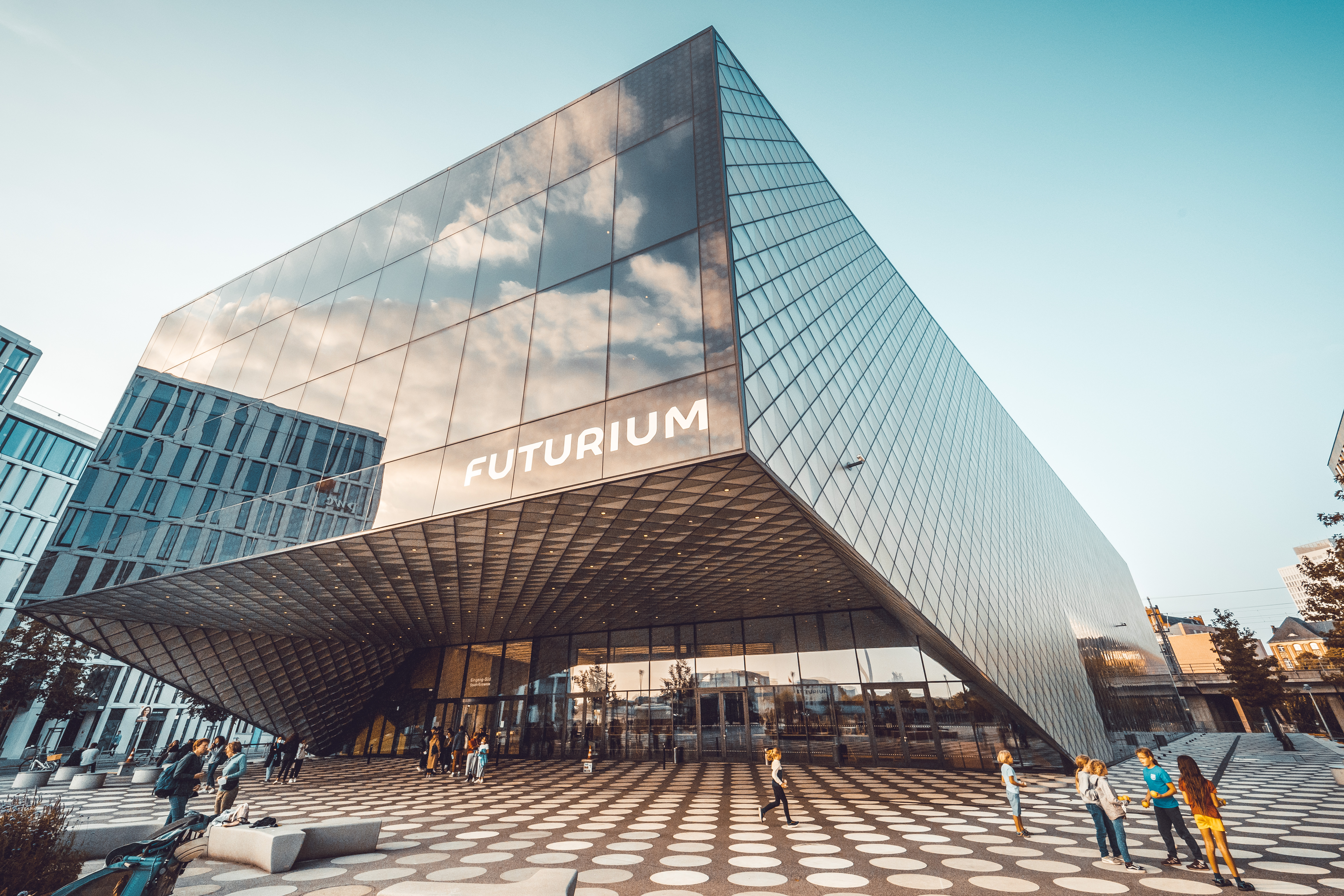
The Futurium in Berlin, 2021

The Futurium, also called Futurium Museum and Musée Futurium, is a museum with futuristic exhibitions and laboratory. It is an initiative of scientific institutions and the Cabinet of Germany. Opened on September 5, 2019, it serves as a "place for presentation and dialogue on science, research and development".

The exhibition building is located on Alexanderufer in the Mitte district of the district of the same name and was designed with a usable area of around 8154 m^{2} on three floors, of which 3200 m^{2} are available for permanent exhibitions and 600 m^{2} in the basement for special exhibitions. The Futurium has also a Forum section for meetings centered around science, politics, culture and civil society.
