= Hotspot gateway =

A hotspot gateway is a device that provides authentication, authorization and accounting for a wireless network. This can keep malicious users off of a private network even in the event that they are able to break the encryption. A wireless hotspot gateway helps solve guest user connectivity problems by offering instant Internet access without the need for configuration changes to the client computer or any resident client-side software. This means that even if client configuration such as network IP address (including Gateway IP, DNS) or HTTP Proxy settings are different from that of the provided network, the client can still get access to the network instantly with their existing network configuration.

Some of the prominent hotspot gateway brands are - WiJungle, Nomadix, Wavertech (WAVER) etc.

== See also ==
- Hotspot (Wi-Fi)
