= Amazingports =

AmazingPorts
- Type: Privately Held
- Industry: Hotspot and Billing Software
- Founded: 2001
- Founder: Jan Eldenmalm
- Headquarters: London, United Kingdom
- Key people: Raj Oruganti, Fredrik Lindgren
- Website: www.amazingports.com

AmazingPorts was a Linux-based software product customized for use as a firewall, captive portal and billing system (Hotspots). The project started in 2001 and is now defunct.

== Description ==
AmazingPorts was mainly deployed as an access control system in private and public networks. It could be deployed as a single hotspot controller in airports, hotels, private locations and hospitals. It was used in Internet cafes in Europe by 2002 together with Intel. It was used for a city-wide Wi-Fi project in 2004, and Internet roaming in 2002.

AmazingPorts was created in 2001 with an initial vision of building free networks. Later the company refocused and provided its technology to network builders. The company implemented service-oriented provisioning in 2002 and was the first to implement 802.11a public hotspots in Europe. During 2009 and 2010 the administrative system was updated.

Features included:

- Firewall
- Service Oriented Provisioning
- NAT
- Distributed and/or centralised routing
- Fully customisable and language sensitive captive portal or any third party web page
- Dynamic Host Configuration Protocol (DHCP) server
- Integrated PayPal payments supporting many currencies
- Automatic currency updates from the European Central Bank
- Roles based Administration
- Seamless Roaming
- Compliance with the anti-terrorist Directive 2006/24/EC
