= Samsung Galaxy J7 Prime =

Android-based smartphone released by Samsung in 2016

Samsung Galaxy J7 Prime Samsung Galaxy On7 (2016)
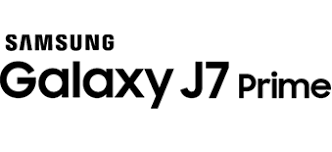

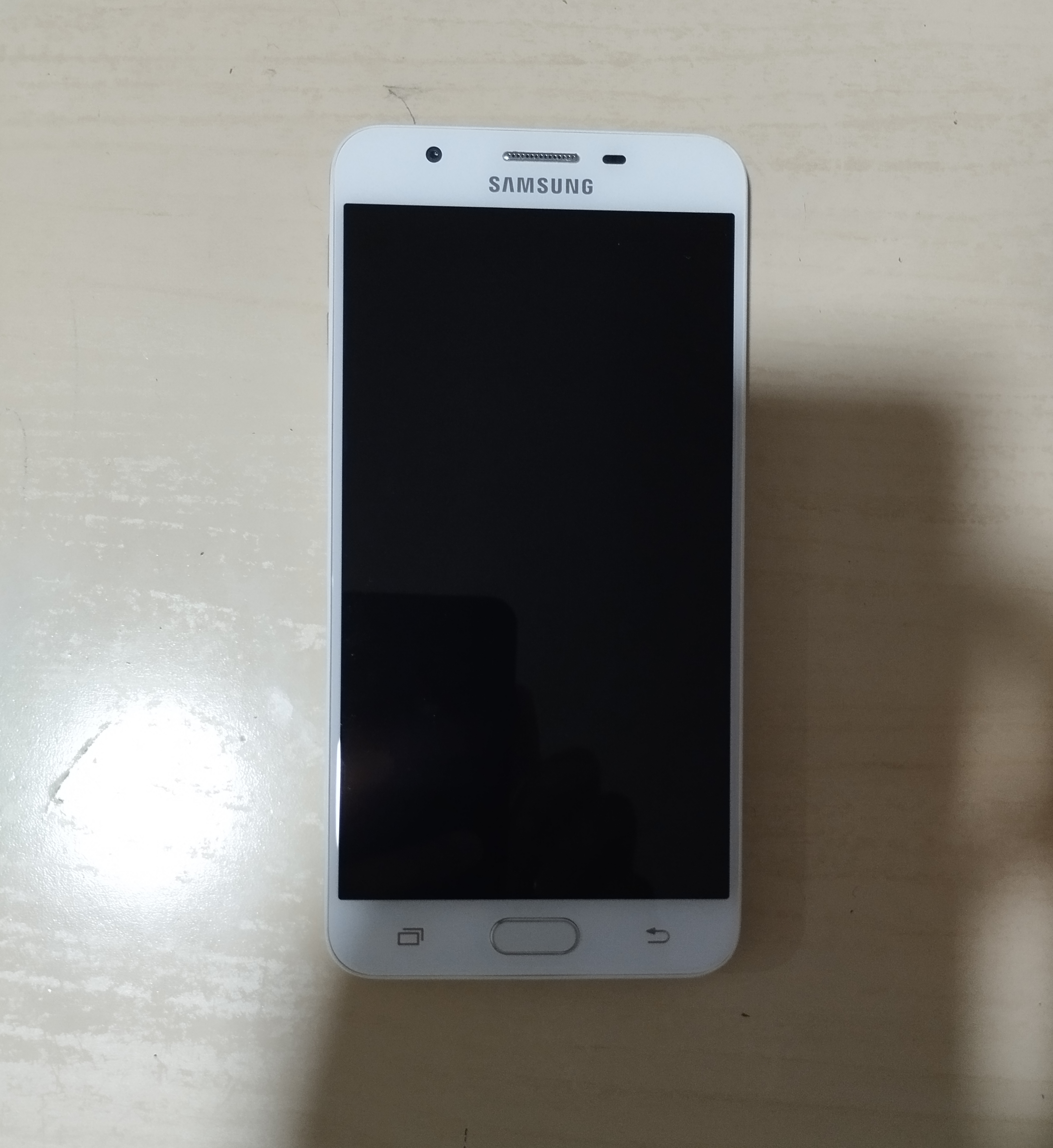
- Samsung Galaxy J7 Prime In White
- Manufacturer: Samsung Electronics
- Type: Smartphone
- Series: Galaxy J series
- First released: September 1, 2016; 10 years ago
- Discontinued: 2018
- Predecessor: Galaxy J7 (2016); Galaxy On7
- Successor: Galaxy J7 (2017)
- Related: Samsung Galaxy J5 Prime; Samsung Galaxy J7 V
- Compatible networks: 2G GSM 850, 900, 1800, 1900; 3G HSDPA 850, 900, 1900, 2100; 4G LTE Bands 1, 3, 5, 7, 8, 20
- Form factor: Slate
- Dimensions: 151.7 mm (5.97 in) H 76 mm (3.0 in) W 8 mm (0.31 in) D
- Weight: 167 g (5.9 oz)
- Operating system: Original: Android 6.0.1 "Marshmallow" (32-bit); TouchWiz (All variants, Current in Philippines, Taiwan variant); Current: Android 8.1 "Oreo" (32-bit); Samsung Experience 9.5 (G610F/M), Android 8.0 "Oreo" (32-bit); Samsung Experience 9.0 (China), Android 7.0 "Nougat" (32-bit); Samsung Experience 8.1 (G610Y)
- System-on-chip: Exynos 7 Octa 7870; Qualcomm Snapdragon 625 (China)
- CPU: Octa-core (8×1.6 GHz) ARM Cortex-A53 (64-bit); Octa-core (8×2.0GHz) ARM Cortex-A53 (China)
- GPU: ARM Mali-T830MP1; Adreno 506 (China)
- Memory: 3 GB
- Storage: 16, 32 GB, 64 GB
- Removable storage: microSD up to 256 GB
- SIM: NanoSIM, Dedicated Slot, DSDS
- Battery: 3300 mAh Li-ion
- Charging: 5V@1.35A (6.75W)
- Rear camera: 13 MP Sony Exmor RS IMX259, f/1.9, LED flash
- Front camera: 8 MP f/1.9, LED flash (Latin America)
- Display: 5.5", 1080 × 1920 px (401 ppi) FHD TFT LCD
- Sound: Mono Loudspeaker, Right Mounted
- Connectivity: WLAN 802.11 b/g/n, Bluetooth 4.1, GPS/GLONASS, microUSB 2.0, 3.5 mm headphone jack
- Data inputs: Accelerometer, proximity sensor
- Model: SM-G610x (x varies by carrier and region)
- Development status: Discontinued
- SAR: 0.56 W/kg (head) 1.02 W/kg (body)
- Other: Fingerprint sensor, FM radio, Notification LED (except Latin America)
- Website: www.samsung.com/in/support/model/SM-G610FZDDINS/

The Samsung Galaxy J7 Prime (also known as the Samsung Galaxy On7 (2016)/On Nxt) is an Android-based smartphone produced and marketed by Samsung Electronics. It was unveiled on August 31, 2016, and released the month after. It was the first J series smartphone to feature an aluminium metal chassis alongside the Galaxy J5 Prime. The new smartphone included several new features that had never been used before on a phone. For example, the phone featured split screen application modes.

== Specifications ==
The J7 Prime has a 13 megapixels Sony Exmor RS IMX258 rear camera with LED flash, f/1.9 aperture, auto-focus and an 8 megapixels Samsung's in-house ISOCELL front camera with f/1.9 aperture.

It is powered by an Exynos 7870 SoC including a 1.6 GHz octa-core ARM Cortex-A53 CPU, Mali-T830MP1 GPU with 3 GB RAM. The either 16 or 32 GB of internal storage can be expanded up to 256 GB via microSD card.

The J7 Prime comes with a 5.5-inch Full HD PLS TFT screen, always-on fingerprint sensor and a 3300 mAh battery.

=== Software ===
The J7 Prime was launched with Android 6.0.1 "Marshmallow", running on Samsung's proprietary TouchWiz user interface. It can be upgraded to Android 8.1 "Oreo" along with Samsung's user interface, Samsung Experience. It supports VoLTE, Samsung Knox and Samsung's software enhancements.

== Re-release ==
The Samsung Galaxy J7 Prime was later re-released in April 2018 as the Samsung Galaxy J7 Prime 2 (also known as the Samsung Galaxy On7 Prime). It shares almost the same specifications with the original model, but it weighs 3 grams heavier than the original model, has a 13 MP front camera and it runs on Samsung Experience 8.0 powered by Android 7.0 (Nougat), upgradeable to Android 8.0 Oreo and Android 9 Pie. It is only available with 32 GB of storage and 3 GB of RAM.

== See also ==
- Samsung Galaxy
- Samsung Galaxy J series
