= Björn Freiberg =

- Born: 28 March 1970 (age 56); Isny im Allgäu, West Germany
- Occupation: Actor
- Years active: 1994–present
- Known for: Appearance in Son of Saul and The Martian

Björn Freiberg (born 28 March 1970 in Isny im Allgäu) is a German actor, painter, author, translator and former University teacher. He is known as actor and German voice in Son of Saul. In 2015 the film won the Grand Prize of the Jury at Cannes Film Festival as well as the award of the International Federation of Film Critics. The film won Best Foreign Language Film Oscar at the Academy Awards 2016. He also plays a NASA staff member in The Martian (2015) directed by Ridley Scott.

Björn Freiberg holds a Ph.D. in Economics and a Magister artium in Philosophy, Economics and Law and was teaching from 2000 until 2014 at Széchenyi István University in Győr, Hungary.
