= Vallabhnagar railway station =

Railway Station in Rajasthan, India

General information
- Location: Vallabhnagar, Rajasthan; India
- Elevation: 489 metres (1,604 ft)
- System: Indian Railways station
- Owner: Indian Railways
- Operator: North Western Railway
- Line: Ahmedabad–Udaipur City line
- Platforms: 1
- Tracks: 2

Construction
- Structure type: Standard (on-ground station)
- Parking: No
- Cycle facilities: No

Other information
- Status: Active
- Station code: VBN
- Zone(s): North Western Railway
- Division(s): Ajmer
Location

Vallabhnagar railway station is a small railway station in Dungarpur district, Rajasthan. Its code is VBN. It serves the village of Vallabhnagar. The station consists of one platform. The platform is not well sheltered. It lacks many facilities including water and sanitation.
