= MobileStar =

Internet service provider

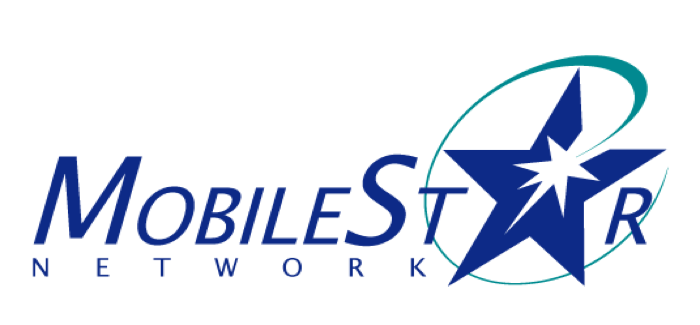
First logo of MobileStar Network, Inc.

MobileStar Network was a wireless Internet service provider which first gained notability in deploying Wi-Fi Internet access points in Starbucks coffee shops, American Airlines Admiral Club locations across the United States and at Hilton Hotels. Founded by Mark Goode and Greg Jackson in 1998, MobileStar was the first wireless ISP to place a WiFi hotspot in an airport, a hotel, or a coffee shop. MobileStar's core value proposition was to provide wireless broadband connectivity for the business traveler in all the places s/he was likely to "sleep, eat, move, or meet." MobileStar's founder, Mark Goode, was the first to coin the now industry standard expression "hotspot," as a reference to a location equipped with an 802.11 wireless access point.

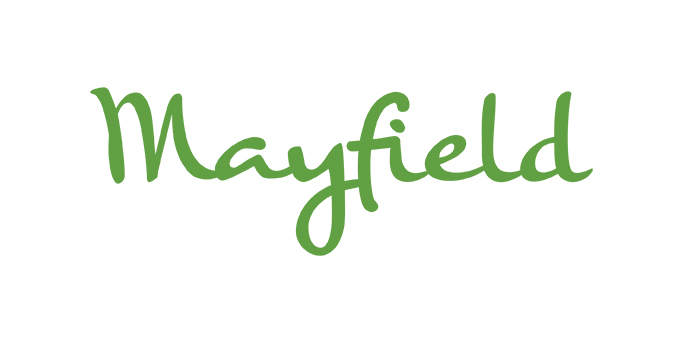
Mayfield Fund, San Jose, CA

MobileStar's financing was initially provided by Greg Jackson. A predecessor entity, PLANCOM (Public Local Area Network Communications), was disbanded and the intellectual property moved into MobileStar Network. During the Series A financing round, funds were obtained from high-net-worth investors, corporate investors including Proxim and Comdisco, and institutional investors from New York. The Series B investors, who invested $38 million, included the Mayfield Fund and Blueprint Ventures.

MobileStar's initial deployments used a frequency hopping product supplied by Proxim. As reported in the EE Times, "In a move that represents the first use of unlicensed wireless LAN technology in the industrial scientific and medical (ISM) bands to develop a nationwide Internet-access network, Proxim Inc. has teamed up with Dallas-based MobileStar Network Inc. to link its 2.4-GHz unlicensed RangeLAN2 wireless LAN to a national network of Internet access points." However, after the IEEE 802.11b standard was adopted, MobileStar converted its network infrastructure to the 802.11b industry standard. The initial infrastructure was manufactured and financed by Cisco. MobileStar's founders faced many challenges in developing the company: evolving technology standards, fluid business models, no industry standard billing system, and questions about the competitive value of a site license agreement instead of licensed spectrum. Over time each of these issues were addressed and the agreement with Starbucks in late 2000 signaled a maturing of the marketplace. American Airlines also entered into an agreement with MobileStar as did Hilton Hotels As more laptop vendors included integrated 802.11 wireless connectivity within their laptops, users came to expect broadband connectivity in their residences, workplaces, and in public locations such as airports, coffee shops, and hotels. License-free broadband connectivity exploded with the advent of the iPhone in 2007, further validating the premise that license-free spectrum could open up a large domain of connectivity at a cost far less than licensed spectrum. The rise of voice over IP (VOIP) communications operating on the 2.4 MHz spectrum via the 802.11 standard was another indicator of the power of ubiquitous, low to no cost wireless broadband communications.

MobileStar Network's demise in 2001 was the result of at least two important factors: the collapse in the private equity markets in mid-2001 and the events of September 11. While MobileStar's investors provided a bridge loan during the mid-2001 time frame, the terrorist attacks in New York and Washington brought a steep decline in business travel, MobileStar Network's initial core market. MobileStar's investors could not continue to finance the business and new investors were skittish about investing in a company focused on serving a market that had recently and rapidly collapsed.

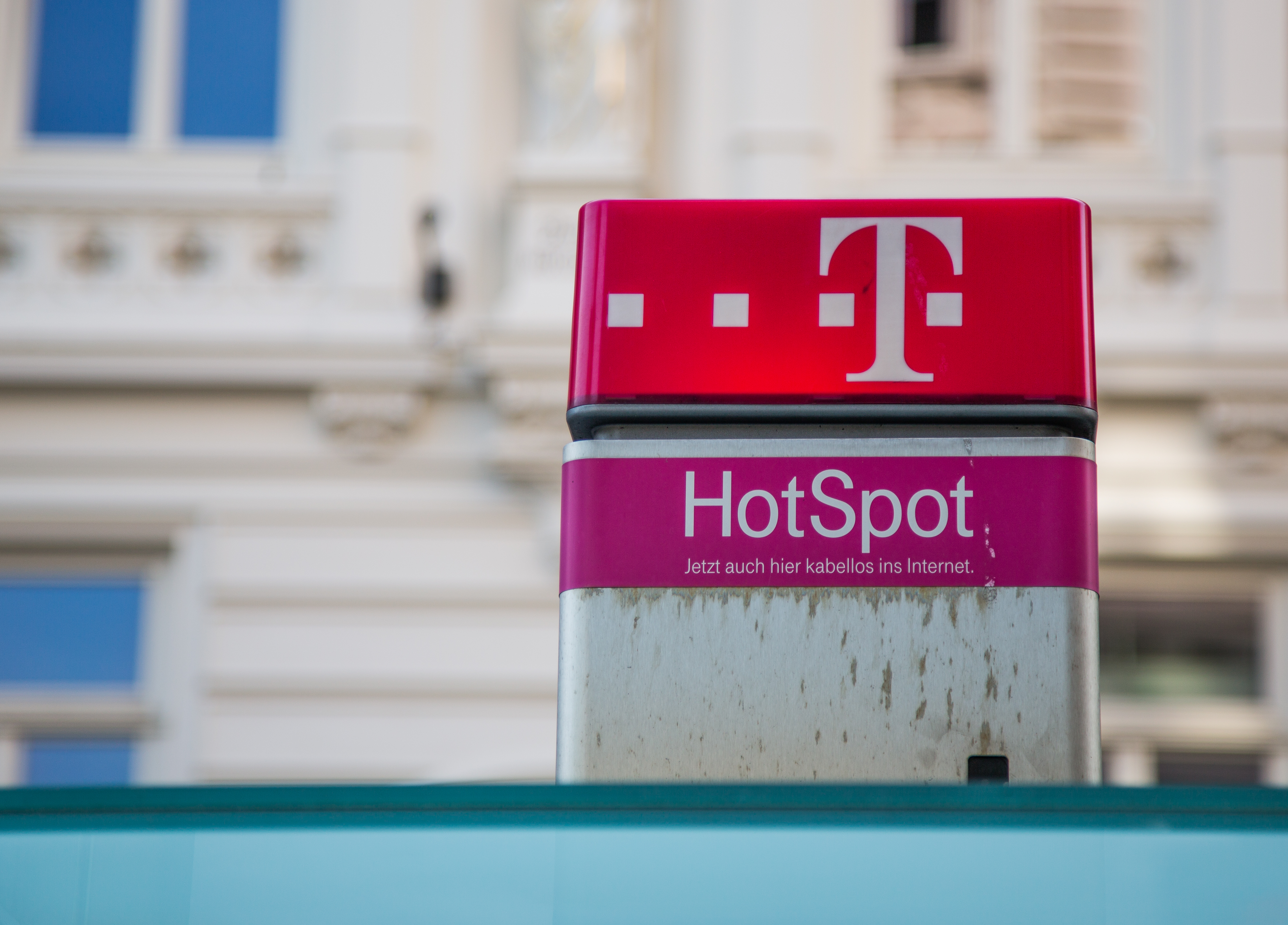
T-Mobile Hotspot location

MobileStar Network ceased operation in October 2001, but its bankrupt assets and contracts were bought by Voicestream Wireless and by February 2002, was operating as T-Mobile Broadband. T-Mobile Broadband was the first part of VoiceStream to rebrand to the T-Mobile name. It was officially launched as T-Mobile HotSpot in August 2002.
