= Service-oriented provisioning =

Service-oriented provisioning (SOP) is a technology concept developed during the early 2000s to curb the hyper competition developing in the Wireless Internet service provider (WISP) and ISP space. It refers to the capability of defining and working with "services" instead of "on/off" internet access or "service profiles" - see the RADIUS protocol.

By enabling service-oriented provisioning, a telecommunication service provider can define their service offering as a specific set of services, the main advantage being that product differentiation can be achieved and thus price differentiation.

== Consumer advantage ==
Consumers can choose services adapted to their need, this becomes specifically interesting in modern type broadband networks where traditional "laptop" access is mixed with smaller hand held devices targeting for example voice services.

== Challenges ==
Implementing service-oriented provisioning requires the network operator to re-engineer the way services are created and distributed into a network. This re-engineering is a result of extensive usage of profile-oriented provisioning which technically is similar to service-oriented provisioning except that a profiles based approach does not scale properly. In a profile-oriented system the number of required profiles grows exponentially with the number of services provided by a network. In a service-oriented system the number of required "profiles" grows linearly.

== See also ==
- RADIUS protocol
- Amazingports implementation of SOP
