= Nespos =

Open source information platform about Pleistocene humans

NESPOS is an open source information platform about Pleistocene humans, providing detailed information about important sites, their analytical results, archaeological findings and a selection of literary quotes. Moreover, it is a repository where archaeologists and paleoanthropologists can exchange their research results and ideas by a protected Wiki-based collaboration platform with a continuously growing sample of 3D scanned human fossils and artefacts.

== NESPOS ==
NESPOS was developed during the EU-funded project TNT and was designed as an interactive online database containing, in the long run, all available anthropological and archaeological data related to Neanderthals, e.g. computed tomography (CT) and 3D surface scans of Neanderthal fossils and artefacts as well as additional data like scanned literature, images or tables. TNT was a Specific Targeted Research or Innovation Project of the EU “Digicult” program, which facilitates research and preservation work on Europe's artistic and cultural treasures using modern technology. Involved in the project were: ART+COM, a company for interactive media technology in Berlin; PXP Software Austria GmbH, an e-Business company in Austria; the Hasso-Plattner Institute in Potsdam, Germany; the Royal Belgian Institute of Natural Sciences in Brussels; the University of Poitiers in France; the Natural History Museum of Croatia; the Neanderthal Museum in Mettmann and National Geographic Germany. Using Wiki-functionality, the NESPOS users themselves are able to upload data or add their comments to their colleagues’ entries. A metadata search provides an efficient tool for content retrieval. In addition, software for 3D and 2D visualisation of digitised finds as well as geographic information about excavation sites is an integrated part of the system. Since March 2006 NESPOS is open to the scientific community. In 2008 NESPOS underwent an updating and is now open for all kinds of data on human evolution. Data on Homo erectus, Homo heidelbergensis and Australopithecus africanus have already been uploaded. Another huge updating process was started in April 2009. NESPOS is now open for any user, only the important 3D-datasets are stored in a spezialed Space, which can only be entered by scientific members of the Society.

== VisiCore Suite ==
VisiCore Suite - The NESPOS 3D applications are conjoint with the Visual Simulation and Collaborative Rendering Engine. The VisiCore Suite provides archaeological visualisation and annotation tools.

The two main components are:

ArteCore - the Artefact Exploration and Collaboration Rendering Engine provides a toolset of real-time 2D and 3D visualisation routines for the examination of the remains‘ virtual high resolution-representations.

GeoCore - the Site Mapping and Rendering Engine provides a mapbased geo information system for presenting, exploring, and editing of archaeological excavation data in real-time 3D perspective.
