= Visitor Based Network =

A Visitor-based network (VBN) is a computer network intended for mobile users in need of temporary Internet access. A visitor-based network is most commonly established in hotels, airports, convention centers, universities, and business offices. It gives the on-the-go user a quick and painless way to temporarily connect a device to networks and broadband Internet connections. A visitor-based network usually includes hardware (such as VBN gateways, hubs, switches, and/or routers), telecommunications (an Internet connection), and service (subscriber support).

== What is a VBN Gateway? ==
Virtually any Internet-based Ethernet LAN can become a visitor-based network by adding a device generally termed a "VBN gateway". The function of a VBN Gateway is to provide a necessary layer of management between public users and the Internet router to enable a plug and play connection for visitors. Typical VBN Gateway provide services and support for billing and management application integrations, such as PMS systems (in hotels), credit-card billing interfaces, or Radius/LDAP servers for central authentication models.

A common criteria for VBN gateways is they allow users to connect and access the available network services with little or no configuration on their local machines (specifically modification to their IP address). In order to accomplish this a layer 2 (See: OSI model#Layer 2: Data link layer) connection is required between the user and the VBN gateway. Aside from the layer 2 (or bridged) network requirement, there are really no other restrictions for using a VBN gateway to enable a network. As such, Ethernet, 802.11x, CMTS, and xDSL are all acceptable mediums for distributing networks to use with VBN Gateways.

In the simplest form a VBN gateway is a hardware device with a minimum of two network connections. One network connection is considered the subscriber network, and the other the uplink to the Internet. The majority of VBN gateways on the market today all use Ethernet interfaces for their connection, but as stated above, any layer 2 connection is acceptable for this.

== Types of VBNs ==
Generally speaking there are three models of operation for a VBN: Transparent, Pay For Use, and Authenticate For Use.

Transparent VBN

A transparent VBN's purpose is to provide network services to users to reduce support and/or IT infrastructure costs. Generally these networks are not concerned with security but rather fast and easy access. Metro Wi-Fi networks, or free to use Hotspots are examples of this type of VBN.

Billing VBN

A billing-based VBN is one where users are required to pay to obtain network services. Traditionally these types of VBNs are found in hotel or Hotspot (Wi-Fi) networks. Payment services are provided in a variety of methods, most commonly with a credit card Merchant account in hot spot environments or integration to a property management system in hotel environments.

Authentication VBN

An authenticate for use VBN is most commonly found in business environments. In these cases the VBN gateway requires users to authenticate to the gateway in order to be allowed access to network services. Commonly this authentication is achieved via integration to RADIUS or LDAP servers or by implementing access-codes which a user would be required to enter.

== How does a VBN work? ==
While manufacturers offer many different configurations for VBN gateways, a set of common features exist. Even the most basic VBN gateways provide DHCP and Proxy ARP to allow users to connect to the network with no IP address configuration required. A captive portal is used for a variety of functions including, billing or authentication and acceptance of terms and conditions. Once the user successfully meets the criteria in the captive portal, the VBN gateway then allows the user's traffic to be routed through.
