= Joachim Sauter =

German media artist and designer (1959–2021)

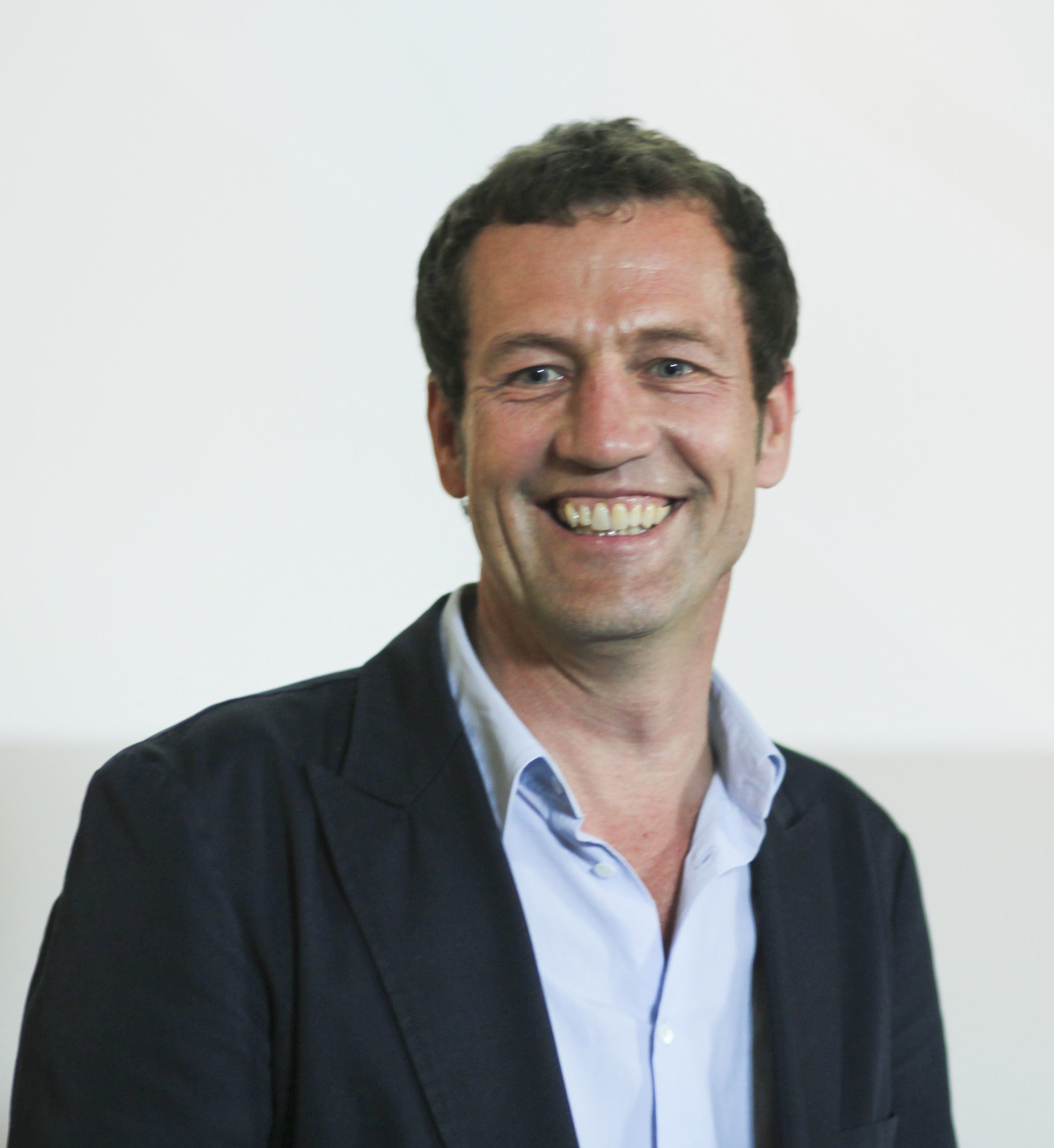
- Joachim Sauter in 2010
- Born: 16 May 1959; Schwäbisch Gmünd
- Died: 10 July 2021
- Occupations: Artist, sculptor, university teacher
- Employers: Berlin University of the Arts; University of California, Los Angeles

Joachim Sauter (16 May 1959 – 10 July 2021) was a German media artist, designer and technology entrepreneur. He was appointed Professor for New Media Art and Design at the Universität der Künste Berlin, UdK (Berlin University of the Arts) in 1991, and in 1993 he created Terravision (computer program), before pursuing a lawsuit against Google for infringing the patent. He became an adjunct professor at UCLA, Los Angeles in 2001.

== Early life and education ==
Sauter studied design at the UdK Berlin, and direction and camera at the German Academy for Film and Television, Berlin. He was using computers both as a tool and as a medium since the early stages of his work. A pioneer of new media, he developed and shaped the field from the early 1980s on.

== Career ==
In 1988, he founded the new media design studio ART+COM with other designers, architects, technologists, and other artists and scientists. Their goal was to research the new medium in the realms of art and design, emphasizing the translation of information (easily transmissible via new media) into physical spaces, offering a more communal, reality-grounded experience than could be achieved with computer monitors alone. As Head of Design at ART+COM, Sauter led the interdisciplinary group's innovative experiments, using new technologies to convey complex topics while exploring their potential for spatial communication and art.

== Personal life and death ==
Sauter was married and had a son. He died on 10 July 2021 following a serious illness.

== Projects with ART+COM (partial) ==
Art:

- 2018 "Petalclouds" – kinetic installation
- 2018 "Raffaels Pendulum" – kinetic installation
- 2017 "Chronos XXI" – kinetic installation
- 2013 "Symphonie Cinétique – The Poetry of Motion" – exhibition and performance in collaboration with Ólafur Arnalds
- 2013 "Ink Drops to the Origin" — interactive installation
- 2012 "Kinetic Rain" – kinetic installation
- 2008 "Kinetic Sculpture" – kinetic sculpture
- 2007 "Duality" – interactive environmental installation, Tokyo
- 2002 "Behind the Lines" – interactive installation
- 1999–2002 "The Jew of Malta" – medial stage
- 1995–2008 "The Invisible Shapes of Things Past" – architectural sculptures made of films
- 1992 "De-Viewer" – interactive installation

Design:

- 2008 "Spheres" – mediatecture
- 2005 "documenta mobil" – mobile exhibition
- 2004 "floating.numbers" – interactive table installation
- 2004 "Austrian Flag" – interactive flag
- 1995– ? "timescope" – low-tech augmented reality device
- 1994 "Terravision" – interactive installation showing a virtual representation of the Earth using satellite imagery, commissioned in 1994 by Deutsche Telekom

== Exhibitions (partial) ==
- 2013 "LeBains", Paris, France
- 2011 "Matter Light II", Borusan Center for Culture and Arts, Istanbul, Turkey
- 2010 "moving spaces", Alva Aalto Museum, Aalborg, Denmark
- 2008 "on cities", National Architecture Museum Stockholm, Sweden
- 2007 “From Sparc to Pixel”, Martin Gropius Bau, Berlin, Germany
- 2006 “Venice Biennale of Architecture”, German Pavilion, Italy
- 2006 “Shanghai Biennale", China
- 2006 “Digital Transit”, ARCO, Madrid, Spain
- 2005 "São Paulo Biennale of Architecture", Brasil
- 2004 “Navigator”, National Museum of Fine Arts, Taichung, Taiwan
- 2003 “Future Cinema”, ZKM, Karlsruhe, Germany/Lille, France
- 2001 “Invisible”, Museum of Contemporary Art, Porto, Portugal
- 1998 “Portable Sacred Grounds”, ICC, Tokyo, Japan
- 1996 “Wunschmaschine, Welterfindung”, Kunsthalle Wien, Austria
- 1996 “Under the Capricorn”, Stedelijk Museum, Amsterdam, Netherlands
- 1995 “Anew Europe”, Venice Biennale, Italy
- 1993 “Artec”, Museum of Modern Art, Nagoya, Japan
- 1992 “Manifeste”, Centre Pompidou, Paris, France

== See also ==
- Installation art
