= Samsung Chat 335 =

Mobile phone model

Samsung GT-S3353/Samsung Ch@t 335
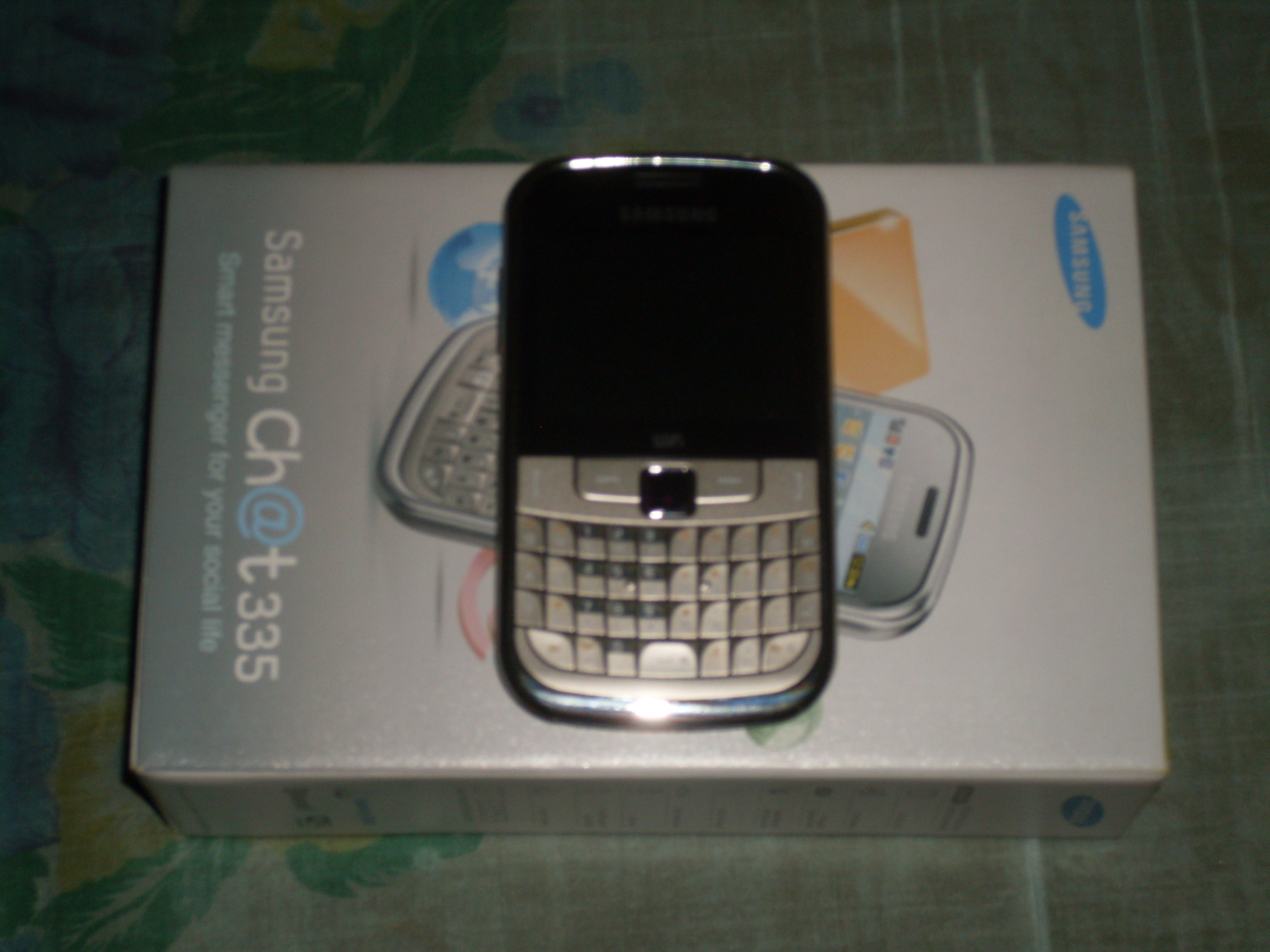
- Samsung Ch@t 335
- Manufacturer: Samsung Electronics
- Type: QWERTY phone
- Series: Samsung Ch@t series
- First released: December 2010
- Availability by region: December 2015; 10 years ago
- Predecessor: Samsung Ch@t 322
- Successor: Samsung Ch@t 527
- Related: Samsung Ch@t 332
- Form factor: Bar phone
- Dimensions: 111.2 mm (4.38 in); 12 mm (0.47 in)
- Weight: 93 g (3.3 oz)
- Battery: Standard, Li-on
- Display: TFT, 256,000 colors, 320×240 in.
- Connectivity: Bluetooth 2.1 with A2DP, 802.11b/g (WLAN)
- Data inputs: QWERTY
- Other: Radio with RDS, Java
- References: GSMArena.com

Samsung Ch@t 335 is a QWERTY phone made by Samsung Electronics. It was first announced in November 2010, then it was released a month after. The main features of the phone are its physical QWERTY keyboard, an optical trackpad, and Wi-Fi (802.11b/g). The phone's screen has a 320×240 px resolution. Other hardware features are Bluetooth 2.1 with A2DP, and an FM radio with RDS support. The device also supports Java applications.

== See also ==
- Samsung Galaxy Chat
- Samsung Group
