= Galaxy Avatar =

Virtual character avatar by Samsung Electronics

Galaxy Avatar characters

Galaxy Avatar, formerly AR Emoji, is a customizable digital avatar created by Samsung Electronics. The avatar appears mainly on Samsung Galaxy devices. A self Galaxy Avatar is created using augmented reality (AR) face recognition directly using the camera or by selecting an existing photograph, and can be edited. Further customization including a clothes designer feature is offered using the downloadable Avatar Editor app. The avatar may be used to create emoji-like stickers including animated GIFs in the Avatar Sickers app, and Avatar Camera allows real-time photos and videos to be made with an avatar.

== Uses ==
A Galaxy Avatar can be used as a user's Samsung contacts profile picture and call screen card, with the possibility to share the card with an QR code. It has also been integrated for use as a watch face for Samsung Galaxy Watches since the Galaxy Watch 4, or displayed on the cover screen of Samsung Galaxy Z Flips since One UI 3.1.

A popular use is the use of the avatar as stickers, using a set of pre-made expressions, which can be saved and shared. More sticker sets are offered on the Galaxy Store. The user's stickers are integrated within the Samsung virtual keyboard for direct use during texting. Avatar videos feature an avatar in pre-made dancing animations which can be shared or also be used on call and lock screens, and beginning with One UI 6.1 also for alarms and reminders. Photos and videos with the avatar being overlaid on the camera can be taken using the Avatar Camera app.

The Galaxy Avatar is integrated for use within Google Meet. Additionally, Samsung also offer an SDK for Unity that allows the avatar to be used by developers in other applications.

== Creation technique ==
The Galaxy Avatar's notable feature is how it may be created, using machine learning and facial recognition technology to map a person's face captured on the selfie camera. It then creates an animated 3D model from it and applies the avatar to stickers. As initially reported, the face recognition maps more than 100 facial features. The technology behind it relies on a software framework provided by Loom.ai, a company headed by CGI (computer-generated imagery) veteran Kiran Bhat. Alternatively, Galaxy Avatar also has some pre-generated avatars that could be used including of fictional characters.

== History ==
Galaxy Avatar was introduced as AR Emoji in February 2018 along with the announcement of the flagship Samsung Galaxy S9. Work on the feature first began in 2016. It was designed by a team at Samsung composed of Wonhyung Cho, Hye-Bong Kim, Hoik Hwang and Jiyoun Kim, with the goal of making communication more "personal". Along with the launch, Samsung also collaborated with The Walt Disney Company to feature Disney characters as AR Emoji. An update rolled out in July 2018 that gave improved face-tracking detection and introduced a function named My Emoji Editor to fine tune some facial features of the avatar.

In 2019, AR Emoji's tracking gained the ability to track also a person's eyes, tongue and body movements. The Body Tracking feature captures a person's body movement using technology by DeepMotion, relying on 3D pose estimation. Along with further customization, AR Emoji also introduced new features like Mask Mode which applies the avatar's face over a real person's photographed face.

Samsung's Jinho Lim from the Graphic R&D Group said in an interview: "Ultimately, our goal is to make AR Emoji a personified visual assistant in the coming age of AI (Artificial Intelligence). For example, currently Bixby can give us updates on the weather, but I believe that information could be delivered more effectively by an AR Emoji holding an umbrella".

Originally a new AR Emoji would be created within the Camera app. In 2020, with the release of One UI 2.1, this was shifted to a new app called AR Zone that combined all AR-related features (such as AR Doodle and Deco Pic) from Samsung together in one place. In 2025, with the release of One UI 7, AR Emoji was rebranded to Galaxy Avatar and is now accessible from the Advanced features section of Settings (or an optional menu icon), with the former AR Emoji Studio tool now on the main screen of Galaxy Avatar.

== Reception ==
When AR Emoji debuted in 2018 (and largely seen as a response to Apple's Animoji), it generally received a cold reception, with much criticism regarding the AR-generated designs of users's faces. TechCrunch wrote: "The custom AR Emoji isn't as adorable as Apple's animals or benign as Nintendo's Mii avatars. Instead, it straddles that uncomfortable line between cartoon and realistic 3D scan a bit uncomfortably.". A preview from The Verge also reiterated this point but also adding that "Samsung may have been a little too ambitious on a technical level". The New York Times wrote in a review of the Galaxy S9 that the AR Emoji outputs "look creepy", and that "The result is a phenomenon that robotics experts describe as “uncanny valley”. Tom's Guide also described the models and their movement as "downright creepy".

According to the creator of the technology framework at Loom.ai, the AR Emoji's initial lackluster performance was because creating a better and more realistic real-time render would take much longer than what Samsung deemed acceptable to users. A "super-realistic" avatar could be created from a selfie using the technology but it would take as much as 7 minutes to render it. Samsung used its own 2D tracker on how the face moves, but Loom.ai noted that AR Emoji can be superior in the future depending on how Samsung uses their framework and if it finds it worthy to invest in.

After Samsung improved the AR Emoji, it received a more positive reception. The AR Emoji received an iF Product Design Award in 2020.
