= Samsung Galaxy A7 (2018) =

Android smartphone

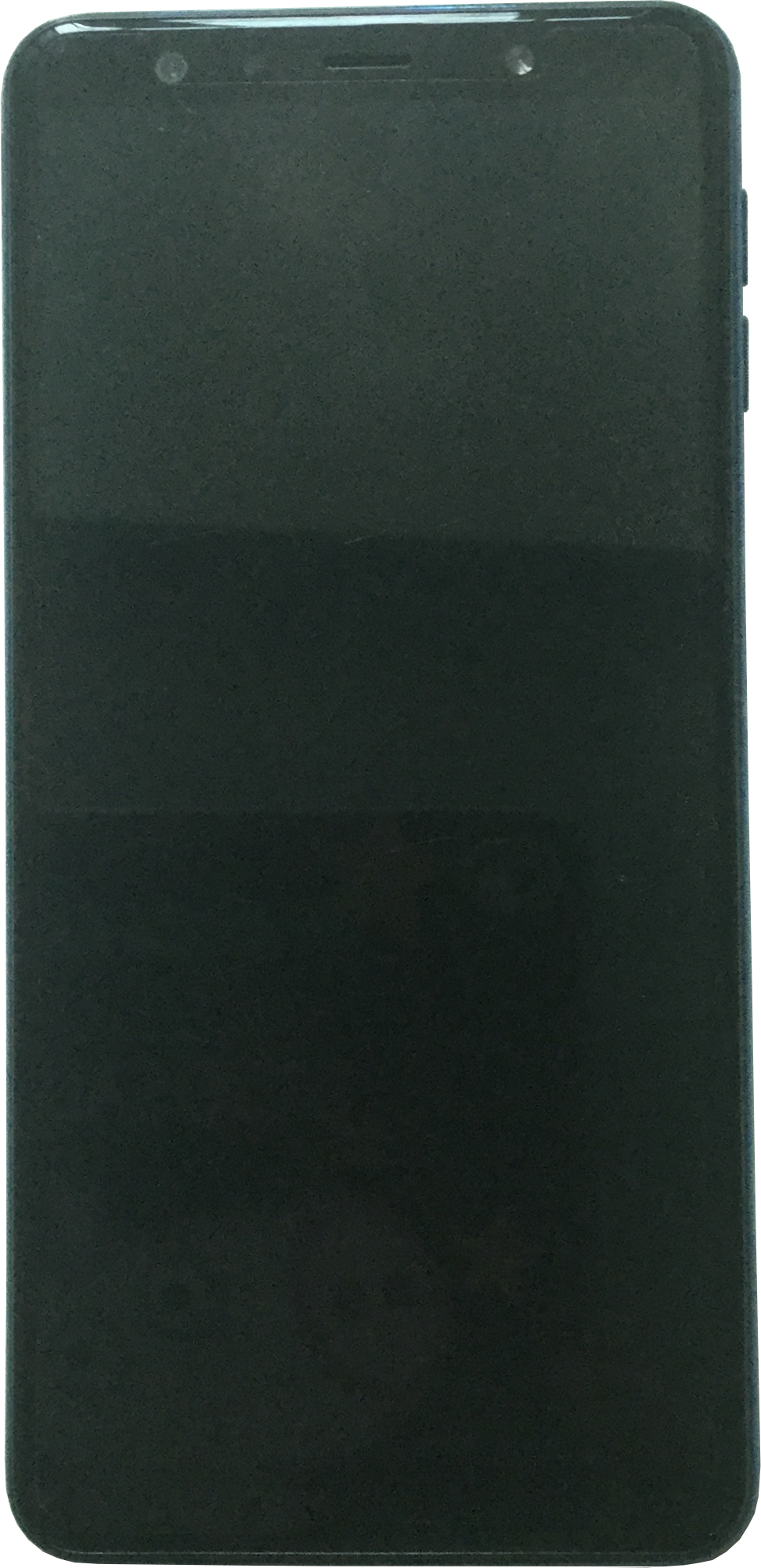
- Brand: Samsung Galaxy
- Manufacturer: Samsung Electronics
- Type: Smartphone
- Series: Galaxy A
- First released: September 20, 2018; 8 years ago
- Availability by region: October 2018; 8 years ago (International); October 1, 2019; 7 years ago (Japan)
- Predecessor: Samsung Galaxy A6 / A6+ (2018); Samsung Galaxy A7 (2017)
- Successor: Samsung Galaxy A50
- Related: Samsung Galaxy A6 / A6+ (2018); Samsung Galaxy A6s; Samsung Galaxy A8 / A8+ (2018); Samsung Galaxy A8/A9 Star; Samsung Galaxy A8s; Samsung Galaxy A9 (2018); Samsung Galaxy S9; Samsung Galaxy Note 9
- Form factor: Slate
- Dimensions: 159.8 × 76.8 × 7.5 mm
- Weight: 168 g (6 oz)
- Operating system: Original: Android 8.0 "Oreo" with Samsung Experience 9.0; Current: Android 10 with One UI 2.0
- System-on-chip: Samsung Exynos 7 Octa 7885
- CPU: Octa-Core 2x Cortex-A73 2.2 GHz & 6x Cortex-A53 1.6 GHz
- GPU: Mali-G71 MP2
- Memory: 4 GB/6 GB RAM
- Storage: 64 GB/128 GB
- Removable storage: up to 512 GB
- Battery: 3300 mAh (International); 3400 mAh (Japan) (non-removable)
- Rear camera: Primary: 24 MP, f/1.7, 27mm, 1/2.8", 0.9µm, PDAF; Ultrawide: 8 MP, f/2.4, 18mm, 120˚, 1/4.0", 1.12µm; Depth: 5 MP, f/2.2, 1/5.0", 1.12µm; LED flash, Panorama, HDR; 1080p@30fps (gyro-EIS), 1080p@240fps, 720p@960fps
- Front camera: 24 MP, f/2.0, 26mm (wide), 1/2.8", 0.9µm; HDR; 1080p@30fps
- Display: 6.0" Super AMOLED FHD+ display with Gorilla Glass 3 1080×2220 px (18.5:9 Aspect Ratio)
- Connectivity: 802.11 a/b/g/n/ac, Wi-Fi hotspot; Bluetooth v5.0, A2DP, EDR; USB 2.0 via microUSB, NFC
- Data inputs: Fingerprint sensor (side-mounted), accelerometer, gyro sensor, proximity sensor, compass, hall sensor, proximity sensor, RGB light sensor
- Model: SM-A750x (where 'x' varies by carrier & international models); SM-A750C (Japan; Rakuten Mobile)

The Samsung Galaxy A7 (2018) is a luxury mid-range Android smartphone produced by Samsung Electronics as part of the Samsung Galaxy A series. It was announced on 20 September 2018 as the successor of Samsung Galaxy A7 (2017).

The A7 (2018) is the first triple camera smartphone produced by Samsung, featuring 3 different cameras on the rear. It features a 6-inch Super AMOLED Infinity Display with curved edges similar to the Samsung Galaxy A8 (2018), a side-mounted fingerprint sensor on the power button and Dolby Atmos immersive sound technology.

== Specifications ==
=== Design ===
Galaxy A7 (2018) features a Gorilla Glass front panel with a reflective glass back panel, the side frame is made of plastic. It is available in black, blue, gold, and pink with some models supporting dual sim.

=== Hardware ===
The A7 (2018) features a 6-inch Full HD+ (1080x2220 pixels) Super AMOLED display with 18.5:9 aspect ratio. The display features curved edges similar to the S9's infinity display, but with larger bezels and without curved sides.

The smartphone features an upgraded Exynos 7885 SoC with an octa-core processor consisting of 2 performance ARM Cortex-A73 and 6 efficient ARM Cortex-A53 cores and Mali-G71 MP2 GPU backed by 4GB RAM and 64 GB/128 GB of internal storage that is expandable up to 512 GB via a dedicated microSD card slot. The device retains a non-removable battery like its predecessor, but at a lower rating of 3300mAh, and eliminates Fast-Charging capability. It features a typical microUSB connector, rather than its predecessor's newer USB-C connector. Unlike its predecessor, it goes away with IP68 water and dust resistance.

The triple camera setup features a primary 24 MP sensor with f/1.7 aperture for normal photography, an ultra-wide 8 MP sensor with f/2.4 aperture and 120 degrees viewing angle, and a 5 MP depth sensor for effects such as Bokeh. The rear cameras feature an intelligent Scene Optimizer that include 19 different lighting modes for different scenes. The front camera is a 24MP sensor, complete with its own dedicated flash. The A7 (2018) rear camera features a Sony IMX576 camera sensor, identical to the A9(2018). The fingerprint sensor has been shifted from the back and integrated into the side-mounted power button, a first for a Samsung smartphone.

=== Software ===
It runs Android 8.0 "Oreo" with Samsung Experience 9.0 out of the box. Its extra features include Bixby Home without Bixby voice support and Bixby button and always-on display. It can be upgraded to Android 9 with One UI and Android 10 with One UI 2.

== Availability ==
Following the unveiling, Samsung announced that the device will go on sale in selected European and Asian market from October 2018, with future plans to release in other countries.
