= Samsung Galaxy A6s =

Android smartphone

- Brand: Samsung Galaxy
- Developer: Samsung Electronics
- Manufacturer: Wingtech (contract manufacturer)
- Type: Phablet
- Series: Galaxy A series
- First released: October 2018; 8 years ago
- Availability by region: November 2018; 8 years ago
- Predecessor: Samsung Galaxy A6 / A6+ (2018)
- Related: Samsung Galaxy A6 / A6+ (2018); Samsung Galaxy A7 (2018); Samsung Galaxy A8 / A8+ (2018); Samsung Galaxy A8/A9 Star; Samsung Galaxy A8s; Samsung Galaxy A9 (2018); Samsung Galaxy S9; Samsung Galaxy Note 9
- Form factor: Slate
- Dimensions: 156.3 × 76.5 × 8.4 mm
- Weight: 183 g (6 oz)
- Operating system: Android 8.1.0 "Oreo" with Samsung Experience 9.5
- System-on-chip: Qualcomm Snapdragon 660
- CPU: Octa-Core 4x Kyro 260 2.2 GHz & 4x Kyro 260 1.8 GHz
- GPU: Adreno 512
- Memory: 6 GB RAM
- Storage: 64 GB/128 GB
- Removable storage: up to 256 GB
- Battery: 3300mAh (non-removable)
- Rear camera: 12MP f/1.8 (wide); 5MP f/2.2 (depth) with single flash
- Front camera: 12MP f/2.0
- Display: 6.0" PLS TFT LCD FHD+ display with Corning Gorilla Glass 1080×2160 px (18:9 aspect ratio) (~402 ppi)
- Connectivity: 802.11 a/b/g/n, Wi-Fi hotspot; Bluetooth v4.2, A2DP, EDR; USB-C
- Model: SM-G6200

The Samsung Galaxy A6s is a midrange Android smartphone produced by Samsung Electronics as part of the Samsung Galaxy A series. It was introduced on 24 October 2018. It is the first Galaxy smartphone not to be manufactured by Samsung, but by Wingtech. Launched in conjunction with the Samsung Galaxy A9s, it is targeted at the Chinese market.

Its main feature is its 6-inch LCD Infinity Display with curved edges similar to the Samsung Galaxy A8/A9 (2018).

== Specifications ==
The A6s features a 6.0 inch Full HD+ PLS TFT LCD with 18:9 aspect ratio. Unlike previous Samsung Galaxy A series smartphones, this device uses a LCD panel rather than a Super AMOLED display. The display features curved edges, similar to the S9's infinity display, but with larger bezels and no curved display.

The dual camera setup features a primary 12 MP f/1.8 sensor for normal photography and a 5 MP depth sensor for effects such as bokeh. The front camera is a 12 MP sensor.

It runs Android 8.1.0 "Oreo" with Samsung Experience 9.5 out-of-the box. The smartphone features Qualcomm Snapdragon 660 SoC consisting of an octa core processor with 4 performance 2.2 GHz Kryo 260 and 4 efficient 1.8 GHz Kryo 260 cores and Adreno 512 GPU, sports 6 GB/8 GB of RAM and 128 GB of internal storage which is expandable up to 256 GB via dedicated MicroSD card slot.

== Availability ==
The A6s was only released and available in the Chinese market from November 2018. No plans have been announced to launch the device in other markets.
