= Bixby (software) =

Intelligent personal assistant by Samsung

- Logo used since 2025

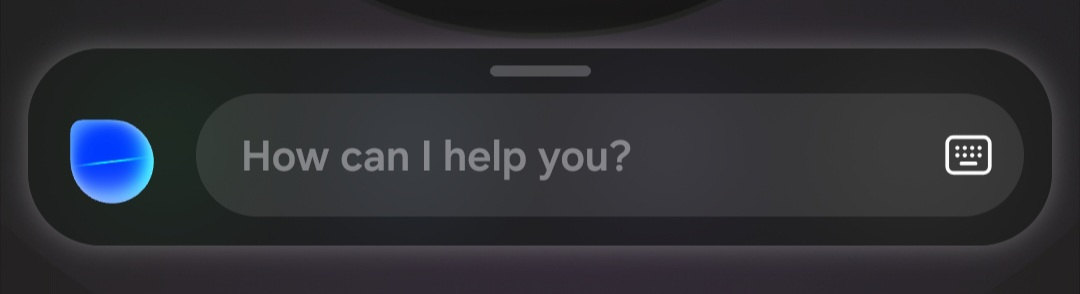
- A summoned Bixby listening to a voice command in One UI 8 (Bixby 4.0)
- Developer: Samsung Electronics
- Release: 21 April 2017; 9 years ago

Stable release(s) [±]
- Android: 4.1.21.2 / 5 October 2026
- Written in: Various, mostly JavaScript
- Operating system: Android, Tizen, Windows, Wear OS
- Predecessor: S Voice
- Available in: 12 languages
- List of languages English (American, British, American-Canadian, British-Canadian & Indian), French, Korean, Mandarin (China & Hong Kong), German, Spanish, Italian, Portuguese (Brazilian), Japanese (Japan), & Cantonese (Hong Kong)
- Type: Intelligent personal assistant
- License: Proprietary
- Website: www.samsung.com/us/apps/bixby/

Bixby (/ˈbɪksbi/) is a virtual assistant developed by Samsung Electronics that runs on various Samsung-branded appliances, primarily mobile devices but also some refrigerators televisions and PCs. It uses voice commands and a natural-language user interface to answer questions and perform tasks, while adapting to the users' preferences and behavior. The latest version, Bixby 4.0, also shifts to using large language models (LLM).

Samsung first launched Bixby in 2017. Originally it was a suite of different smart components alongside the voice assistant (Bixby Voice), but over time the suite was dismantled and since 2026 Bixby only consists of the voice assistant. These former components included Bixby Routines (now renamed Modes and Routines) and Bixby Vision, a contextual and visual search augmented reality camera app.

== Release ==
On 20 March 2017, Samsung announced the voice-powered digital assistant named "Bixby" as a replacement of the S Voice assistant. It was introduced alongside the Galaxy S8 and S8+ and the Galaxy Tab A (2017) during the Galaxy Unpacked 2017 event. Although released for these devices, it could also be sideloaded on older Galaxy devices running Android Nougat. Before the phone's release, the Bixby Button was reprogrammable and could be set to open other applications or assistants, such as Google Assistant. However, near the phone's release, this ability was removed with a firmware update. Remapping remained possible through third-party apps.

Bixby was launched in Korean on 1 May 2017 (KST). Bixby Voice was intended to be made available in the US later that spring. However, Samsung postponed the release, as Bixby had issues understanding English. The English version was finally rolled out in July 2017, followed by a Chinese language version later that year. Bixby's original logo was designed by Samsung and design firm Pentagram.

== Versions and features ==
Bixby is a voice assistant for Samsung smartphones, smartwatches, televisions and other products, that provides device control, information retrieval, and task automation using voice input and artificial intelligence. It can answer contextual queries, adjust system settings, perform searches, and manage reminders or schedules. The service also personalizes responses by recognizing individual user voices.

Bixby itself was also formerly called Bixby Voice to differentiate from other Bixby tools in the suite.

=== Bixby 1.0 ===
Bixby 1.0 was released in May 2017. Built around a "cognitive tolerance" philosophy, Samsung engineered it to be a voice-driven replacement for physical finger taps.

=== Bixby 2.0 ===
The Bixby Voice screen in Bixby 2.0 running on a Samsung Galaxy Android smartphone

In October 2017, Samsung announced the release of Bixby 2.0 during its annual developer conference in San Francisco. It shifted from a mobile device-only software into a cloud-based ecosystem and rolled out across the company's line of connected products, including smartphones, TVs, and refrigerators. The platform was opened to third parties to develop applications for Bixby using the Bixby Developer Studio software development kit.

Samsung attempted to deal with some of the criticism aimed at the launch Bixby. The voice gained better contextual awareness to handle natural dialogue, sounding less robotic. Another added ability was multiple users of a household having their own voices recognized. A multi-task macro command ability was also added, letting Bixby 2.0 simultaneously perform multiple tasks (e.g. phone brightness lowered and smart home lighting color changed) with one command.

In August 2018, Samsung announced the Bixby-integrated Galaxy Home smart speaker. That same year Bixby came out for the Samsung Galaxy Watch.

In 2019, UX developers at Samsung stated that they intended to use AR Emoji avatars as a personified Bixby assistant. At SDC19, Samsung displayed the Galaxy Home Mini speaker, which also supported Bixby.

=== Bixby 3.0 ===
Bixby 3.0 running in Windows 11 responding to a query

Bixby 3.0 was released with One UI 3 at the start of 2021. With version 3.0, the full screen layout was removed in favor of a less intrusive listening bar at the bottom of the screen to blend more into the background. The Home and Reminder components were decoupled from Bixby also to make it lighter.

Bixby also launched for Microsoft Windows in October 2021, with distribution through the Microsoft Store. This version of Bixby was optimized for Samsung's Galaxy Book computers.

In June 2021, screenshots surfaced for what some thought as a replacement for Bixby. The three-dimensional virtual assistant, Sam, was popular on social media, though it was not intended as a replacement for Bixby.

Further updates in early 2023 introduced increased on-device processing for system-level control tasks (e.g. setting a timer) without needing to make use of the cloud. This included downloadable voice packs for offline speech-to-text dictation. Samsung also launched an AI Bixby custom voice creator, allowing users to record their own voice commands.

In July 2024, Samsung confirmed that it plans to launch an upgraded version of Bixby later that year. This new Bixby would be powered by Samsung's proprietary large language model (LLM) technology, promising a significant boost to Bixby's capabilities with the help of generative AI.

In January 2025, with the announcement of Galaxy S25 and the One UI 7 update, Bixby was no longer the default voice assistant, having been replaced by Google Gemini. Despite this, Bixby still continued to be developed and expanded by Samsung and was revamped at the same time with new AI capabilities. Samsung brought the "smarter" Bixby to Samsung televisions, allowing users to speak to their TV sets and control their homes with it.

=== Bixby 4.0 ===
Bixby 4.0 launched on March 31, 2026 alongside One UI 8.5 and the Galaxy S26 series of hardware. This version marked a large revamp by being powered by generative AI models, allowing conversational language and the ability to handle complex and multi step requests that the previous version of Bixby could not. Samsung itself refers to Bixby 4.0 as a "device agent". Bixby 4.0 makes use of an in-house Samsung large language model (LLM), although have not confirmed whether this is Samsung Gauss 2.

This version of Bixby is also integrated with Perplexity AI, meaning that real-time information from the web or general knowledge questions requiring the cloud are handled by Perplexity which outputs its summary to the user in the Bixby chat and voice interface. Such results appear directly in the Bixby interface instead of opening in a separate web browser which was the case in Bixby 3.0.

Later updates of Bixby 4.0 have added a 'lift to talk' ability (officially called Gesture Wake-up), eliminating the need to audibly say the wake phrase ("Hi Bixby" in English) or tapping on a shortcut or button to summon Bixby.

== Deprecated components ==
Originally, Bixby was a suite of various different utilities, but Samsung has gradually decoupled these off the suite to focus Bixby into being strictly a voice-driven device agent.

=== Bixby Vision ===
Bixby Vision
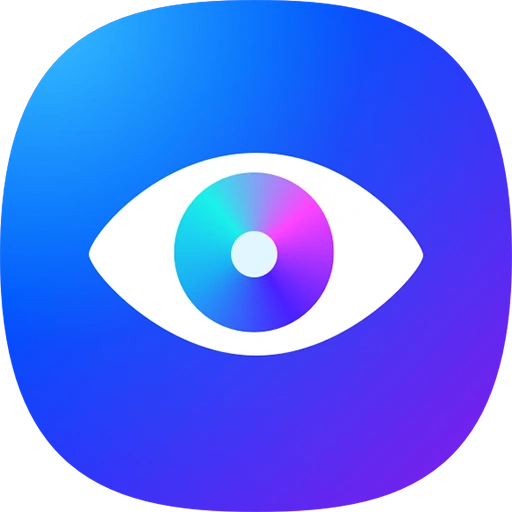
- Logo used from 2025–2026
- Developer: Samsung Electronics
- Release: 21 April 2017; 9 years ago
- Operating system: Android
- Type: Visual search and accessibility
- License: Proprietary

Bixby Vision is a real-time visual recognition feature that analyzes images captured through the device camera and provides context-specific information or actions. It uses both on-device processing and cloud-based AI resources. It was pre-installed on Samsung Galaxy phones and tablets from 2017 to 2026.

Bixby Vision has numerous modes such as 'Text', which identifies text using optical character recognition (OCR) to extract printed or handwritten text seen with the camera for copying, searching, or sharing. The 'Translate' mode detects foreign text and outputs real-time translation on the camera preview.

The 'Discover' mode is a visual search engine powered by Pinterest Lens. Bixby Vision also had a 'Wine' mode specially for recognizing wine labels and outputting information such as variety and origin.

A number of accessibility tools also existed. The 'Scene Describer' mode generates written and spoken descriptions of captured scenes u .sing the camera, while 'Object Identifier' mode identifies and voices real-life items. 'Text Reader' converts detected text into spoken audio using text-to-speech (TTS) functionality and 'Color Detector' identifies and names colors within the frame.

Other modes were Home Decor, Makeup, Styling and Places which were removed in 2020. Many augmented reality tools were consolidated by Samsung into one single app called AR Zone. Bixby Vision was fully dismantled in One UI 8.5 released in 2026. Its tools have been scattered elsewhere in the system, for example Translate and Text modes are now integrated in the Camera app, object and scene tools are moved to Gallery, while Google's Circle To Search serves as a replacement for the Discover visual lookup mode.

=== Bixby Home ===
Bixby Home, the former information screen at launch of Bixby 1.0

Bixby Home was a vertically scrolling home screen displaying cards of information such as weather, fitness activity, and smart home controls. It was renamed Samsung Daily with the release of One UI 2.1 in 2020, then replaced by Samsung Free in One UI 3.0. Samsung Free was eventually discontinued in some markets. Its successor, Samsung News, now functions as a news aggregation service with optional home-screen integration similar to Bixby Home.

=== Bixby Routines ===
Bixby Routines was an automation feature that allowed users to create custom rules based on triggers such as time, location, or device conditions. Beginning with One UI 5.0 released in 2022, it was integrated with Microsoft To Do and renamed Modes and Routines.

=== Other components ===
Bixby Text Call, introduced in One UI 5.0 (2022) in select regions, enabled users to handle incoming calls via speech-to-text conversion and vice versa. It is now named simply Text Call and can be found in the Phone app settings.

Bixby Touch allowed users to trigger context-aware actions by touching on-screen content. It analyzed images, text, and other visual elements displayed on the device and provided related options such as translation, image search, product lookup, or other content-based information. Several of its capabilities overlapped with, or were later superseded by, features offered through Bixby Vision.

Other legacy components including Bixby Touch, Bixby Global Action, Bixby Capsules, Bixby Briefing, Bixby Dictation, and Bixby Wakeup, formed part of the early Bixby suite and have since been phased out, though exact discontinuation details vary by region.

== Regions and languages ==
As of April 2018, Bixby is available in over 195 countries, but only in Korean, English (American), and Chinese (Mandarin). The limitation is that the models not intended for the Japanese market, like S10e, are not allowed to login to Bixby services from Japan; therefore Bixby becomes blocked. The choice of languages has since expanded: Samsung has deployed Bixby's voice command function in French, and on 20 February 2019 Samsung announced the addition of further languages: English (British), German, Italian and Spanish (Spain). On 22 February 2020, Samsung announced the addition of Portuguese (Brazil), for Galaxy S10 and Note10, in Beta, and later for other models. In 2022, Spanish (Latin America) was added as a language.

== Compatible devices ==
=== Flagship series ===
- Galaxy S series: All models since Galaxy S7
- Galaxy Tab S: All models since Galaxy Tab S4
- Galaxy Note: All models since Galaxy Note FE (Note: Bixby Home, Reminder and Vision only available on Android Oreo; S Voice used instead) and Galaxy Note 8
- Galaxy Z series: All models

=== Other series ===
Galaxy A

- Galaxy A24 (Bixby Vision,Bixby Routines,Bixby Voice)
- Galaxy A25 5G (Bixby Vision,Bixby Routines,Bixby Voice)
- Galaxy A27 5G (Bixby Vision,Bixby Routines,Bixby Voice)
- Galaxy A26 5G (Bixby Vision,Bixby Routines,Bixby Voice)
- Galaxy A6/A6+ (Bixby Home, Reminder and Vision)
- Galaxy A7 (2017) (available to users in South Korea only; Bixby Home and Reminder only)
- Galaxy A7 (2018) (Bixby Home, Reminder and Vision only)
- Galaxy A8 (2018) (including A8 Star; Bixby Home, Reminder and Vision only; S Voice used instead)
- Galaxy A8s (Bixby Home, Reminder and Vision only)
- Galaxy A9 (2018)/A9s/A9 Star Pro (including A9 Star and A9 Star Lite; Bixby Home, Reminder and Vision only; S Voice used instead)
- Galaxy A9 Pro (2019) (Bixby Home, Reminder and Vision only)
- Galaxy A20 (Bixby Home and Service)
- Galaxy A21s
- Galaxy A30s (Bixby Home, Vision, Reminder and Routines)
- Galaxy A40 (Bixby Home and Reminder)
- Galaxy A41 (Bixby Home, Vision, Routines and Reminder)
- Galaxy A50 (Bixby Home, Voice, Vision, Reminder and Routines)
- Galaxy A50s (Bixby Home, Voice, Vision, Reminder and Routines)
- Galaxy A51
- Galaxy A52
- Galaxy A52s
- Galaxy A53 5G
- Galaxy A70 (Bixby Home, Voice, Vision and Reminder)
- Galaxy A70s (Bixby Home, Voice, Vision and Reminder)
- Galaxy A71
- Galaxy A72
- Galaxy A73 5G
- Galaxy A80 (Bixby Home, Voice, Vision, Reminder and Routines)
- Galaxy A34 5G
- Galaxy A54 5G
- Galaxy A35 5G
- Galaxy A55 5G
- Galaxy A36 5G
- Galaxy A56 5G
- Galaxy A37 5G
- Galaxy A57 5G

Galaxy M

- Galaxy M35 5G
- Galaxy M36 5G

Galaxy F

- Galaxy F62

Galaxy Tab A

- Galaxy Tab A 10.1 (2016) (Bixby Home)
- Galaxy Tab A 8.0 (2017) (Bixby Home and Reminder only)
- Galaxy Tab A 10.5 (2018) (Bixby Home, Reminder and Vision)

Galaxy J

- Galaxy J4 (2018) (Bixby Home)
- Galaxy J7+ (2017)
- Galaxy J6 (2018) (Bixby Vision, Bixby Home and Bixby Reminders)
- Galaxy J6+ (2018)

Galaxy C

- Galaxy C8 (Bixby Home, Reminder and Bixby Vision only)

Galaxy XCover

- Galaxy XCover Pro

=== Laptops ===
- Galaxy Book series: Models released from May 2021 onwards

== See also ==
- List of chatbots
- Alexa
- Alice
- Clova
- Cortana
- Evi
- Google Lens
- Haptik
- Siri
- S Voice
- Viv (software)

== Notes ==
Preceded by S Voice	Bixby	Succeeded by None
