= Samsung Galaxy Home =

2018 smart speaker by Samsung Electronics

Samsung Galaxy Home Samsung Galaxy Home Mini
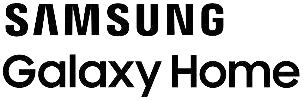
- Brand: Samsung
- Manufacturer: Samsung Electronics
- Type: Smart speaker
- Family: Samsung Galaxy
- First released: 9 August 2018; 8 years ago
- Sound: 3 mid-range and high-range speakers tuned by AKG, subwoofer, 8 far-field microphones
- Connectivity: WiFi and Bluetooth
- Data inputs: Touch screen, voice commands via Bixby
- Website: www.samsung.com/us/explore/galaxy-home/

The Samsung Galaxy Home is a smart speaker manufactured, developed and designed by Samsung Electronics. It was officially announced alongside the Galaxy Note 9 and Galaxy Watch on 9 August 2018, and announced at Samsung Developer Conferences.

== History ==
The Wall Street Journal reported in July 2017 that a Bixby smart-speaker, codenamed Vega, was under development. It was later confirmed by Dong-Jin Koh, CEO of Samsung Electronics, in August 2017.

The Galaxy Home was revealed at the Samsung Unpacked event on 9 August 2018, with more information promised during the Samsung Developer Conference in November.

At the Samsung Developer Conference 2019, held in San Jose, California, they showed the Samsung Galaxy Home Mini, which launched on 12 February 2020.

== Specifications ==
=== Hardware ===
The Galaxy Home has a vase shape and features black cloth material with a mesh design, supported by 3 metal tripod legs. The top surface has a glass touch interface with music and volume controls, and also has an illuminated ring and AKG logo. There are 3 mid-range and high-range speakers and a subwoofer, as well as 8 far-field microphones for voice commands.

External image
- Official images of the Galaxy Home from various perspectives

=== Software ===
The speaker features the Bixby voice assistant and can be activated by saying "Hi Bixby". Its functionality is similar to that found on mobile devices such as the Note 9. The Galaxy Home can adjust its sound to adapt to its environment and also features Sound Steer, a Bixby voice command that allows the device to identify the location of the user in the room and better direct sound.

The speaker features SmartThings Hub integration, allowing it to control other smart home appliances compatible with the Samsung SmartThings platform. Spotify is the default music player, and can be controlled via voice. Audio playback can be also switched between Samsung home appliances.
