= Samsung Experience =

Software overlay by Samsung Electronics

- Samsung Experience 8.1 (based on Android Nougat) running on a Galaxy S8
- Developer: Samsung Electronics
- OS family: Android (Linux), Unix-like
- Working state: Discontinued
- Source model: Open source with proprietary components
- Initial release: January 19, 2017; 9 years ago
- Final release: Samsung Experience 9.5 (Android 8.1) / August 9, 2018; 8 years ago
- Available in: 100+ languages and 25 locales worldwide
- Update method: Firmware over-the-air
- Supported platforms: ARMv7, ARMv8
- Kernel type: Monolithic (modified Linux kernel)
- Default user interface: Graphical
- Preceded by: TouchWiz
- Succeeded by: One UI

Support status
- Unsupported as of October 4, 2021: Google Play Services supported

Samsung Experience (stylized as SΛMSUNG Experience) is a discontinued user interface by Samsung Electronics for its Galaxy devices running Android 7.x "Nougat" and Android 8.x "Oreo". It was introduced in late 2016 as a beta build based on Android 7.0 "Nougat" for the Galaxy S7, succeeding TouchWiz. It has been succeeded in 2018 by One UI based on Android 9 "Pie" and later versions. Older devices (like the Galaxy S7) that received Android 7.0 Nougat first received Samsung Experience 8.0. In comparison, newer devices (such as the Galaxy S8) launched with Android 7.0 Nougat with Samsung Experience 8.1, excluding the Galaxy Xcover 4 and Tab S3, both of which came with Samsung Experience 8.0. The devices were originally in early 2017 due to include TouchWiz.

== History ==
TouchWiz was the former name that Samsung used for its UI and icons. It was originally released in May 2008 for the SGH-F480 mobile phone. Reviewers had criticized Samsung for including too many features and software bloat, especially in the Galaxy S4, which included what many users called a Samsung "feature creep". In the following years, though, Samsung had incrementally removed the bloatware and extra features, until TouchWiz was no longer recognized as TouchWiz, leading them to rename it. The Samsung UX Innovation team collaborated with the design firm Pentagram on the icons, colors, and Bixby wordmark.

== Features ==
=== Home screen ===
Samsung Experience makes several changes to Android's default home screen. The app's icon is on the bottom right of the screen instead of the bottom middle, the Google Now search bar is just below the middle of the screen instead of at the top. There is a weather widget (provided by The Weather Channel or AccuWeather) in the top-right corner of the screen in select countries or devices. In addition, a user can edit the app's grid layout.

=== Edge UX ===
The "Edge" (curved glass at the edge of the screen) was originally introduced on the Galaxy Note Edge and popularized by the Galaxy S6 Edge.

==== Edges ====
The tasks edge gives users a shortcut to commonly utilized tasks, such as making a phone call to a certain contact, setting a timer, and creating an event in S Planner. It is an assortment of icons (e.g., contact pictures [with phone, messaging, or mail icons], an app icon with a plus symbol on its bottom right corner, or a photo [from your library] masked in the shape of a circle [with the gallery icon on the bottom right corner]) on the right of the screen. The people edge allows the user to add 5 different contacts to display on the screen, for quick access to functions such as calling, texting, and emailing. It displays the contact's name and photo. The app's edge displays ten of a user's most frequently used apps, with five in two columns. A user can also add a complete folder to the screen.

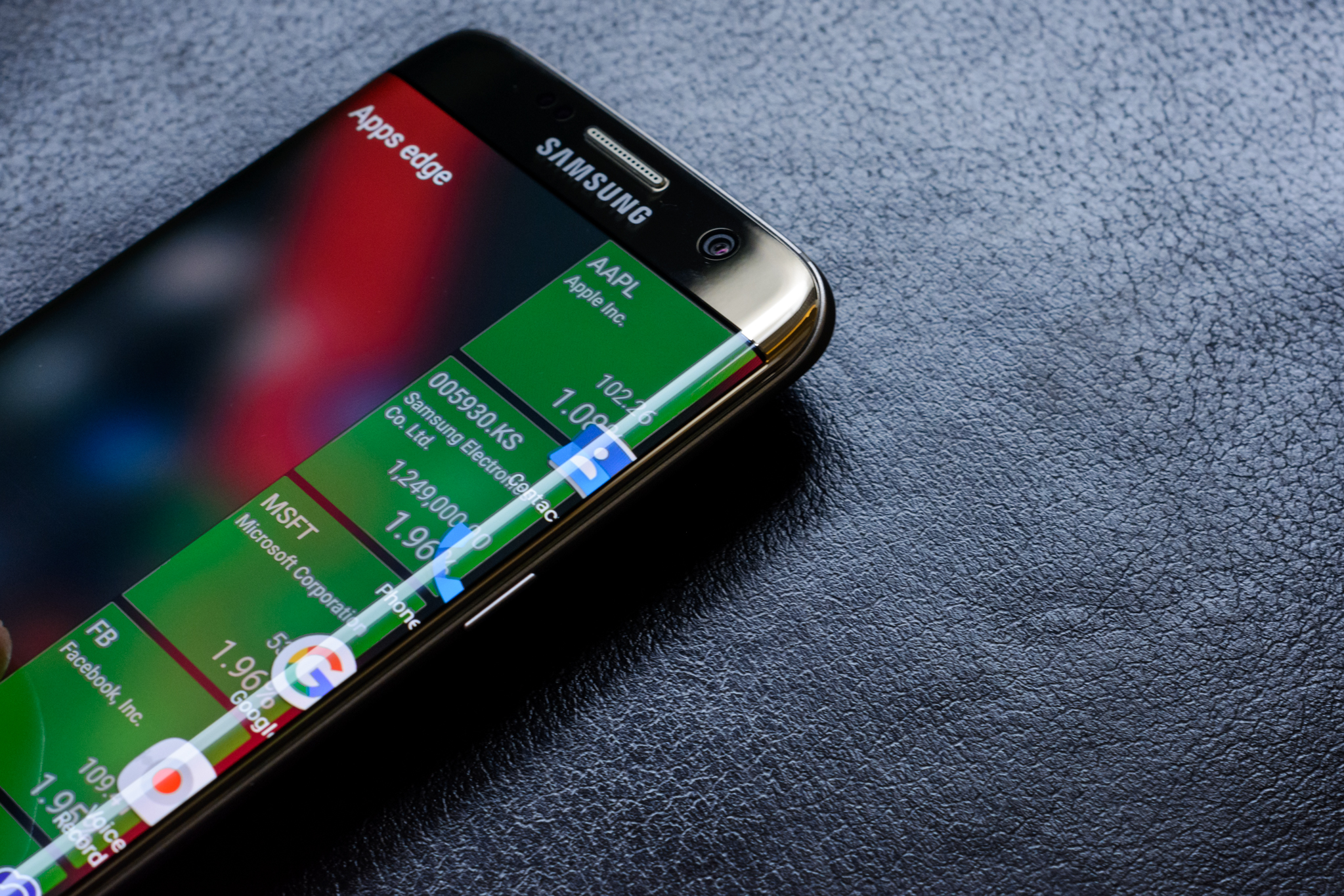
A Galaxy S7 edge phone in the process of switching from the Yahoo! finance panel to the Apps edge panel

==== Edge panels ====
Yahoo! Sports, Finance, and News are panels included with the phone. A user can download extra panels for ease of use, such as an RSS reader, Twitter trends, and news from CNN.

==== Quick tools ====
With quick tools, the Edge transforms into a ruler, compass, or flashlight.

==== Edge feeds ====
When a user swipes the edge of the screen while the screen is off, the edge display turns on and shows missed calls, the current time, weather, and news.

=== Always-on display ===
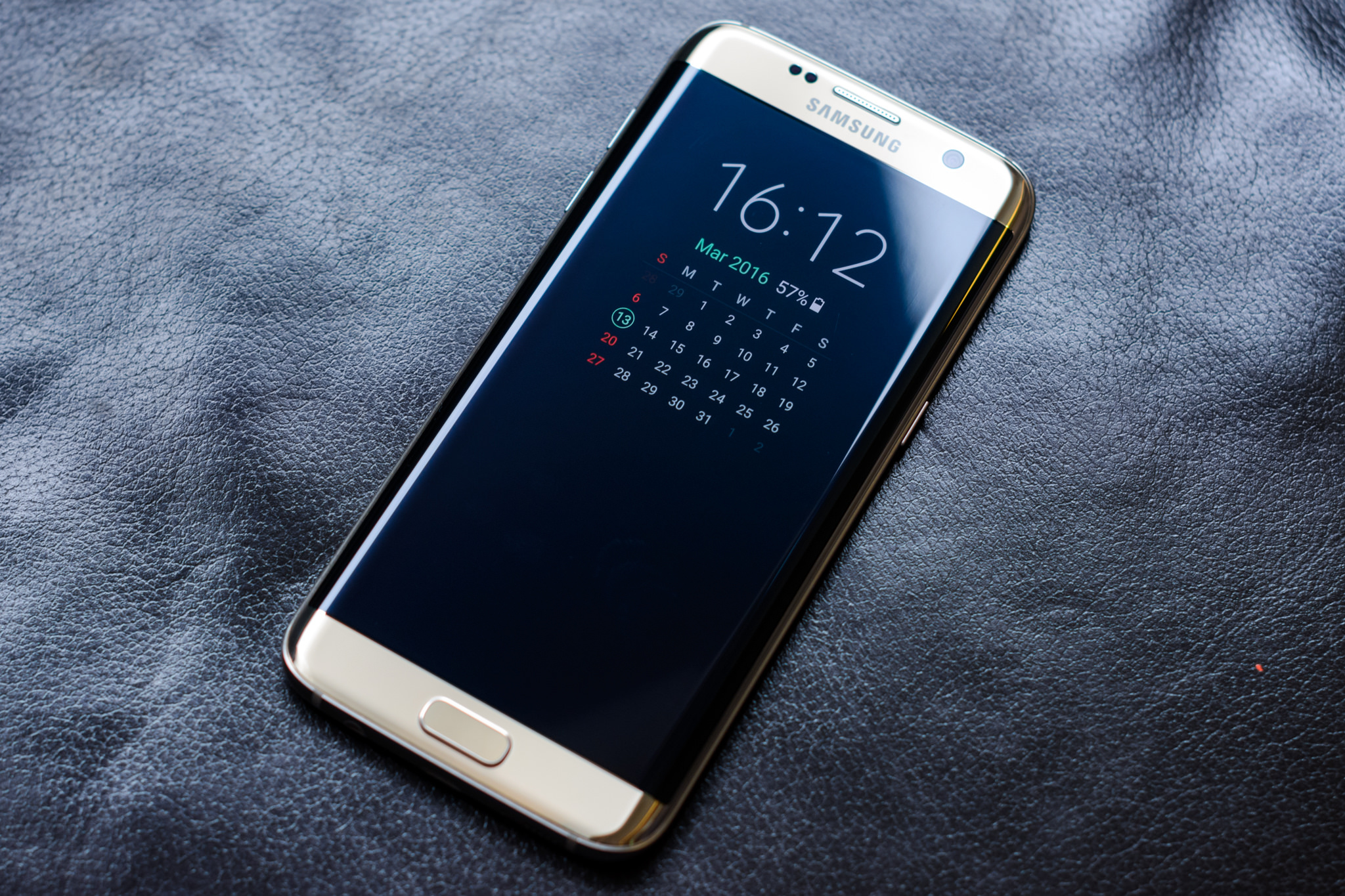
The always-on display on the Galaxy S7 Edge, displaying the time and the calendar

Most Samsung mobile devices have AMOLED displays, and the screen is mostly black when the always-on display is active; only illuminated pixels require power, since they are LEDs. The screen will display the current time, the calendar, or a selected image. There are different styles for each option (the clock has 7 styles, the calendar has 2 styles, and the image has 3 styles). Later on, additional functionality was added to turn on the always-on display feature either in a scheduled manner, or keep it always on. The always-on display also adjusts its brightness as per the ambient light brightness automatically.

The Always-on Display is available on Galaxy A series (2017 & 2018), S7/S7 Edge, S8/S8+, Note 8 and higher, Galaxy J7 (2017)/J7 Pro/J7+ (or C7 2017), Galaxy C5/C7/C9 Pro, and higher devices only. Some devices with OLED panels did not have this feature.

=== File Manager ===
Samsung includes a file manager with its Galaxy phones, unlike stock Android.

It also gives access to Google Drive and OneDrive cloud storage solutions and ability to connect to FTP servers.

=== Game Launcher ===
Any game that a user downloads can be combined into a single folder. In that folder, one can optimize frame rate and resolution. It includes Game Tools, a button that appears when a user is playing a game. When tapped, it can mute notifications, turn off the capacitive keys, minimize the game, screenshot, and record gameplay. This feature was renamed as Gaming Hub in late 2023.

=== Bixby ===
Bixby is an assistant that launched with the Galaxy S8. It replaces S Voice on Samsung phones and has three parts, including Bixby Voice, Bixby Vision and Bixby Home. Bixby Voice can be triggered by saying "Hey Bixby" or pressing and holding the button located below the volume rocker, dubbed the Bixby Button. Bixby Vision is built into the camera app and can "see" what one can see as it is essentially an augmented reality camera that can identify objects in real time, search for them on various services, and offer the user to purchase them if available. Bixby is also able to translate text, read QR codes and recognize landmarks. Bixby Home can be found by swiping to the right on the home screen. It is a vertically scrolling list of information that Bixby can interact with, for example, weather, fitness activity, and buttons for controlling their smart home gadgets.

==== Keyword ====
Bixby can do tasks related to a single keyword. For example, a simple "Good Night" can request the device to turn to silent mode and turn on the Night Mode display.

=== S Pen ===
(exclusive to the Galaxy Note and Tab series)

- Air Command: A collection of shortcuts that appear when the S Pen is taken out.
- Smart Select: Create custom GIFs (also available on Galaxy S8/+ and S9/+ after 7.0 Nougat update)
- Samsung Notes: The user can take notes, draw, annotate, with a wide selection of brushes, pens, and colors (available as app on Galaxy Apps, except of S Pen writing, but still possible with finger or keyboard type)
- Live Message: The user can draw custom emojis, make animated GIFs, or write messages on photos (also available on Galaxy S8/S8+, S9/S9+ and Note FE after 7.0 Nougat update)
- Screen Off Memo: Capture notes when the screen is off.
- Glance: Have two apps open simultaneously and switch back and forth with ease.
- Magnify: Take a closer look whenever you need to.
- Translate: Translate words or sentences, and convert currencies and measurement units.
- Remote Control: Connected with Bluetooth, can trigger camera, navigate web browser, play/pause/fast forward in music apps. (exclusive to the Note 9)

== Version history ==
Version	Android version	Release date	Features
Samsung Experience 8.0	Android 7.0 "Nougat"	January 19, 2017	Redesigned UI: Consistent iconography.; More sophisticated look.; Updated Edge UX: New Task edge options.; Tilt to Unlock: Tilt the phone upwards to unlock it.; Updated Always-On Display: Third-party app and calendar notifications.; Custom signature.; Screen-off memo.; Additional clock styles.; Samsung Cloud: 15 GB free cloud storage (later 5 GB).; Additions to Theme Store: Now includes support for icon packs.; Blue-light filter: Adjust warmth of light on the screen.; Wide Selfie: Selfie with a field of view of up to 120º degrees.; Multi-Locale: Supports more than 100 system languages and 25 locales.; The ability to use two or more languages at the same time.
Samsung Experience 8.1	Android 7.0 "Nougat"	April 21, 2017	Altered design: Outline iconography; Other tweaks; Samsung DeX: Connect a Galaxy S8/S8+/Note8/S9/S9+ to a monitor, keyboard and mouse for a desktop experience.; Bixby: Intelligent interface that learns from you to help you do more. It works with select apps like email and messages, serves up reminders and can help you understand your settings and set up your Samsung devices.; Bixby Vision: Translate foreign languages, scan business cards, scan QR codes, through camera; Samsung Connect support: Control smart appliances; Other: Swipe up for App Drawer; Redesigned settings pane
Samsung Experience 8.5	Android 7.1.1 "Nougat"	September 15, 2017	App Pair (Galaxy S and Note series phones from 7.0 Nougat update): Open two apps at once using Multi Window; Expanded S Pen features: Glance, magnify, and translate; Facial and Iris recognition improvements (exclusive to Galaxy S and Note series): More efficient, and faster; More stable UI: No frame drops; Improved user experience; Samsung did use the older Android 7.1.1 Nougat instead of newer 7.1.2 Nougat
Samsung Experience 9.0	Android 8.0 "Oreo"	February 8, 2018	Bixby: "Bixby briefing" gives updates on weather when an alarm rings; Dual Messenger: Install a second copy of a message account to use with a separate account; Finder: Faster results; Search results from Contacts, Settings, My files, Messages, and Email shown in cards; New results from Galaxy Apps and Google Play; Home: Redesigned Quick Shortcuts; Notification badges on app icons and the panel are synced.; Quick Panel: Manage notifications for each app with notification categories; Icons will be shown at the bottom of the notification panel for notifications that aren't currently visible; Samsung Cloud: View and manage photos and notes only stored in Samsung Cloud; Store any type of file in Samsung Cloud Drive; Open from home screen; SmartThings (formerly Samsung Connect): Manage devices and scenes with cards; Automations based on time, status, and location; Samsung Keyboard: Improved settings; Keyboard toolbar (customization); GIF keyboard; More emojis; More high contrast options are available; Other: Improved system performance; More Edge screen features; DeX improvements; Find My Mobile improvements; Color Lens; Email improvements
Samsung Experience 9.5	Android 8.1 "Oreo"	August 9, 2018	Bixby 2.0: Natural conversation; Individual recommendations; Faster response time; Uber hail support; Emoji: Emoji 11.0 support
Samsung Experience 10.0 (pre-release version of One UI)	Android 9 "Pie"	November 7, 2018	Main article: One UI Later renamed and released as One UI 1.0. Many Samsung apps' version numbers were 9.x in Samsung Experience 9 and incremented to 10.x in One UI 1 and incremented every new One UI version

== Devices running Samsung Experience ==
Note that this list is not exhaustive.

=== Smartphones ===
Device	Version	
Device	Original	Upgradeable
Galaxy S6 and S6 Edge	TouchWiz Zero UX (Android 5.0.2 "Lollipop")	Samsung Experience 8.0 (Android 7.0 "Nougat")
Galaxy S6 Edge+	TouchWiz Noble UX (Android 5.1.1 "Lollipop")	Samsung Experience 8.0 (Android 7.0 "Nougat")
Galaxy S5 Neo (SM-G903W)	TouchWiz Noble UX (Android 5.1.1 "Lollipop")	Samsung Experience 8.1 (Android 7.0 "Nougat")
Galaxy S7, S7 Edge and S7 Active	TouchWiz Hero UX (Android 6.0.1 "Marshmallow")	Samsung Experience 9.0 (Android 8.0 "Oreo")
Galaxy S8, S8+ and S8 Active	Samsung Experience 8.1 (Android 7.0 "Nougat")	One UI 1.0 (Android 9 "Pie")
Galaxy S Light Luxury	Samsung Experience 9.0 (Android 8.0 "Oreo")	One UI 2.5 (Android 10)
Galaxy S9 and S9+	Samsung Experience 9.0 (Android 8.0 "Oreo")	One UI 2.5 (Android 10)
Galaxy Note 5	TouchWiz Noble UX (Android 5.1.1 "Lollipop")	Samsung Experience 8.0 (Android 7.0 "Nougat")
Galaxy Note Fan Edition (FE)	Samsung Experience 8.1 (Android 7.0 "Nougat")	One UI 1.0 (Android 9 "Pie")
Galaxy Note 8	Samsung Experience 8.5 (Android 7.1.1 "Nougat")	One UI 1.0 (Android 9 "Pie")
Galaxy Note 9	Samsung Experience 9.5 (Android 8.1 "Oreo")	One UI 2.5 (Android 10)
Galaxy A3, A5 and A7 (2016)	TouchWiz Noble UX (Android 5.1.1 "Lollipop")	Samsung Experience 8.0 (Android 7.0 "Nougat")
Galaxy A9 Pro (2016)	TouchWiz Hero UX (Android 6.0.1 "Marshmallow")	Samsung Experience 9.0 (Android 8.0 "Oreo")
Galaxy A8 (2016)	TouchWiz Grace UX (Android 6.0.1 "Marshmallow")	Samsung Experience 9.0 (Android 8.0 "Oreo")
Galaxy A3, A5 and A7 (2017)	TouchWiz Grace UX (Android 6.0.1 "Marshmallow")	Samsung Experience 9.0 (Android 8.0 "Oreo")
Galaxy A8 and A8+ (2018)	Samsung Experience 8.5 (Android 7.1.1 "Nougat")	One UI 1.0 (Android 9.0 "Pie")
Galaxy A6; Galaxy A6+ / A9 Star Lite; Galaxy A6s	Samsung Experience 9.0 (Android 8.0 "Oreo")	One UI 2.5 (Android 10)
Galaxy A8 Star / A9 Star	Samsung Experience 9.0 (Android 8.0 "Oreo")	One UI 2.5 (Android 10)
Galaxy A7 (2018); Galaxy A9 (2018) / A9 Star Pro / A9s	Samsung Experience 9.0 (Android 8.0 "Oreo")	One UI 2.5 (Android 10)
Galaxy A8s / A9 Pro (2019)	Samsung Experience 9.5 (Android 8.1 "Oreo")	One UI 2.0 (Android 10)
Galaxy J5 (2016)	TouchWiz Hero UX (Android 6.0.1 "Marshmallow")	Samsung Experience 8.5 (Android 7.1.1 "Nougat")
Galaxy J5 Prime	TouchWiz Hero UX (Android 6.0.1 "Marshmallow")	Samsung Experience 9.0 (Android 8.0 "Oreo")
Galaxy J7 (2016)	TouchWiz Hero UX (Android 6.0.1 "Marshmallow")	Samsung Experience 9.5 (Android 8.1 "Oreo")
Galaxy J7 Prime	TouchWiz Hero UX (Android 6.0.1 "Marshmallow")	Samsung Experience 9.5 (Android 8.1 "Oreo") Samsung Experience 8.1 (Android 7.0 "Nougat") - G610Y
Galaxy J3 (2017) / J3 Pro; Galaxy J5 (2017) / J5 Pro; Galaxy J7 (2017) / J7 Pro	Samsung Experience 8.1 (Android 7.0 "Nougat")	One UI 1.1 (Android 9 "Pie")
Galaxy J7 Max (2017) / On Max	Samsung Experience 8.1 (Android 7.0 "Nougat")	One UI 1.1 (Android 9 "Pie")
Galaxy J7 Nxt / J7 Core / J7 Neo	Samsung Experience 8.1 (Android 7.0 "Nougat")	One UI 1.1 (Android 9 "Pie")
Galaxy J2 (2018) / J2 Pro (2018) / Grand Prime Pro	Samsung Experience 8.5 (Android 7.1.1 "Nougat")	Samsung Experience 8.5 (Android 7.1.1 "Nougat")
Galaxy J7 Prime 2 / On7 Prime	Samsung Experience 8.5 (Android 7.1.1 "Nougat")	One UI 1.1 (Android 9 "Pie")
Galaxy J2 Core	Samsung Experience 9.5 (Android 8.1 "Oreo")	
Galaxy J7 Duo	Samsung Experience 9.0 (Android 8.0 "Oreo")	One UI 2.0 (Android 10)
Galaxy J4	Samsung Experience 9.0 (Android 8.0 "Oreo")	One UI 2.0 (Android 10)
Galaxy J8 / Galaxy On8 (2018)	Samsung Experience 9.0 (Android 8.0 "Oreo")	One UI 2.0 (Android 10)
Galaxy J4+	Samsung Experience 9.5 (Android 8.1 "Oreo")	One UI 2.0 (Android 10)
Galaxy J6	Samsung Experience 9.0 (Android 8.0 "Oreo")	One UI 2.0 (Android 10)
Galaxy J6+	Samsung Experience 9.5 (Android 8.1 "Oreo")	One UI 2.0 (Android 10)
Galaxy On5 (2016) and On5 (2016) Youth Edition	TouchWiz Hero UX (Android 6.0.1 "Marshmallow")	Samsung Experience 9.5 (Android 8.1 "Oreo")
Galaxy On7 (2016)	TouchWiz Hero UX (Android 6.0.1 "Marshmallow")	Samsung Experience 9.5 (Android 8.1 "Oreo") Samsung Experience 9.0 (Android 8.0 "Oreo") - China
Galaxy On8	TouchWiz Hero UX (Android 6.0.1 "Marshmallow")	Samsung Experience 9.5 (Android 8.1 "Oreo")
Galaxy On Nxt	TouchWiz Hero UX (Android 6.0.1 "Marshmallow")	Samsung Experience 9.5 (Android 8.1 "Oreo")
Galaxy C5 Pro and C7 Pro	TouchWiz Grace UX (Android 6.0.1 "Marshmallow")	Samsung Experience 8.1 (Android 7.0 "Nougat")
Galaxy C9 Pro	TouchWiz Grace UX (Android 6.0.1 "Marshmallow")	Samsung Experience 9.0 (Android 8.0 "Oreo")
Galaxy C8 / C7 (2017) / J7+	Samsung Experience 8.5 (Android 7.1.1 "Nougat")	One UI 1.0 (Android 9 "Pie")
Galaxy Feel	Samsung Experience 8.1 (Android 7.0 "Nougat")	One UI 1.0 (Android 9 "Pie")
Galaxy Xcover 4	Samsung Experience 8.0 (Android 7.0 "Nougat")	One UI 1.0 (Android 9 "Pie")
Galaxy Xcover FieldPro	Samsung Experience 9.0 (Android 8.0 "Oreo")	One UI 2.0 (Android 10)
Galaxy M10, M20 and M30	Samsung Experience 9.5 (Android 8.1 "Oreo")	One UI 2.0 (Android 10)

=== Tablets ===
Device	Model number	Version	
Device	Model number	Original	Upgradeable
Galaxy Tab S2 (8.0 and 9.7); 2015 and 2016 versions	All (Except T819C, T815C, T719C)	2015: TouchWiz Zero UX (Android 5.0.2 "Lollipop"); 2016: TouchWiz Hero UX (Android 6.0.1 "Marshmallow")	Samsung Experience 8.0 (Android 7.0 "Nougat")
Galaxy Tab S3	SM-T820, SM-T825	Samsung Experience 8.0 (Android 7.0 "Nougat")	One UI 1.0 (Android 9.0 "Pie")
Galaxy Tab S4	SM-T830, SM-T835	Samsung Experience 9.5 (Android 8.1 "Oreo")	One UI 2.5 (Android 10)
Galaxy Tab A 8.0	SM-T350, SM-T355, SM-P350, SM-P355	TouchWiz Zero UX (Android 5.0.2 ''Lollipop'')	Samsung Experience 8.0 (Android 7.0 "Nougat)
Galaxy Tab A 9.7	SM-T550, SM-T555, SM-P550, SM-P555	TouchWiz Zero UX (Android 5.0.2 ''Lollipop'')	Samsung Experience 8.0 (Android 7.0 "Nougat)
Galaxy Tab A 8.0 (2017); Galaxy Tab A2 S	SM-T380, SM-T385	Samsung Experience 8.5 (Android 7.1.1 "Nougat")	One UI 1.0 (Android 9.0 "Pie")
Galaxy Tab Active 2	SM-T390, SM-T395	Samsung Experience 8.5 (Android 7.1.1 "Nougat")	One UI 1.0 (Android 9.0 "Pie")
Galaxy Tab A 10.5 (2018)	SM-T590, SM-T595	Samsung Experience 9.5 (Android 8.1 "Oreo")	One UI 2.0 (Android 10)
Galaxy Tab E 9.6; US version only	SM-T560NU	TouchWiz Noble UX (Android 5.1.1 "Lollipop")	Samsung Experience 8.0 (Android 7.0 "Nougat")

Preceded by TouchWiz	Samsung Experience; 2017–2018	Succeeded by One UI
