= Samsung Galaxy A8 Star =

2018 smartphone by Samsung Electronics

Samsung Galaxy A8 Star Samsung Galaxy A9 Star
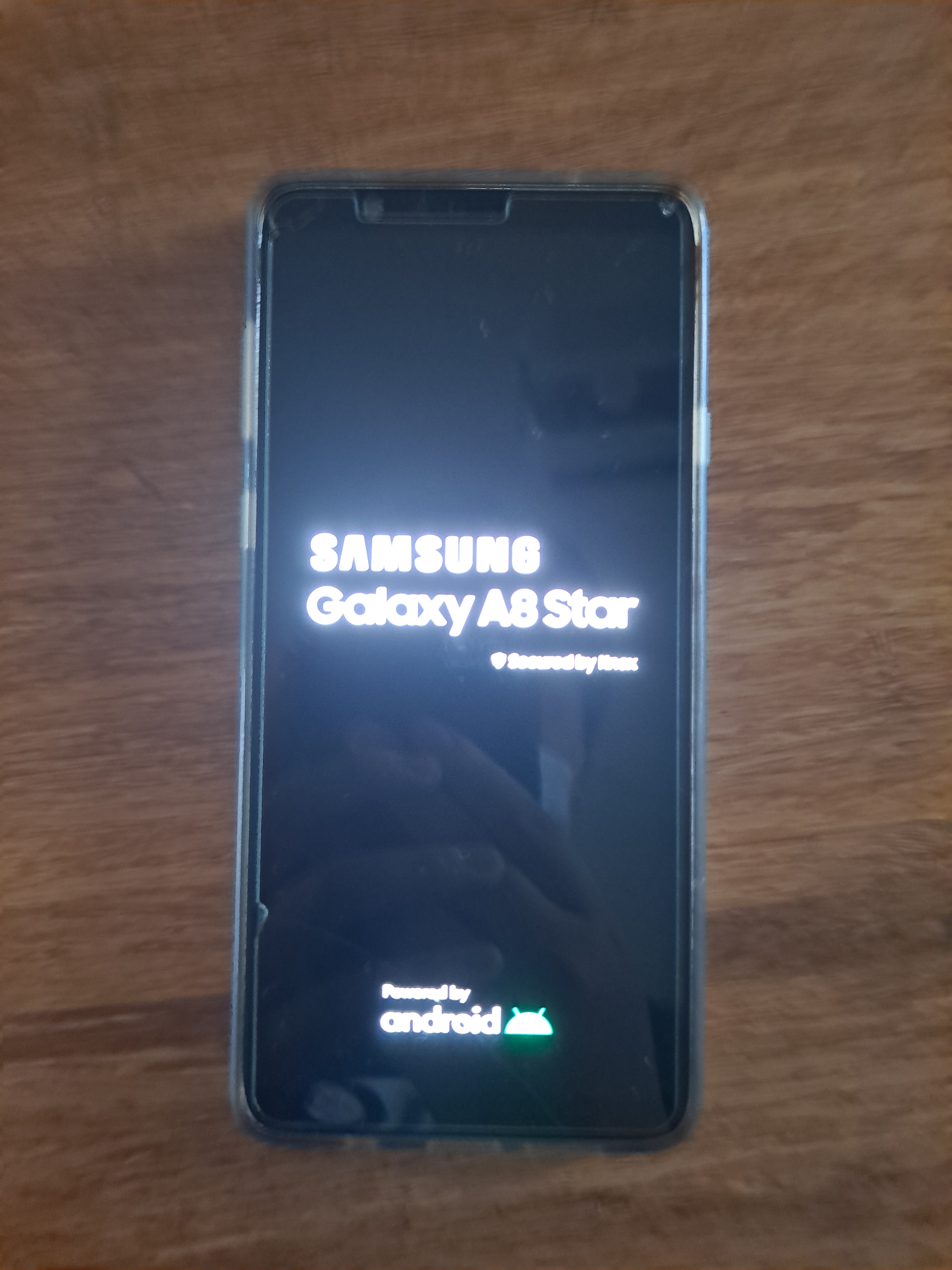
- Brand: Samsung Galaxy
- Manufacturer: Samsung Electronics
- Type: Phablet
- Series: Galaxy A series
- First released: June 2018; 8 years ago
- Successor: Samsung Galaxy A40
- Related: Samsung Galaxy A6 / A6+ (2018); Samsung Galaxy A6s; Samsung Galaxy A7 (2018); Samsung Galaxy A8 / A8+ (2018); Samsung Galaxy A9 (2018); Samsung Galaxy S9; Samsung Galaxy Note 9
- Form factor: Slate
- Dimensions: 162.4 × 77 × 7.6 mm
- Weight: 191 g (7 oz)
- Operating system: Current: Android 10.0 "Q" with One UI 2
- System-on-chip: Qualcomm Snapdragon 660
- CPU: Octa-Core; 4x Kyro 260 2.2 GHz & 4x Kyro 260 1.8 GHz
- GPU: Adreno 512
- Memory: 4 GB/6 GB RAM
- Storage: 64 GB
- Removable storage: up to 512 GB
- Battery: 3700mAh (non-removable)
- Rear camera: Dual 24MP, f/1.7 + 16MP, f/1.7
- Front camera: 24 MP, f/2.0
- Display: 6.3"Super AMOLED FHD+ 2220×1080px (18.5:9 Aspect Ratio)
- Connectivity: 802.11 a/b/g/n/ac, Dual band, Wi-Fi direct, Wi-Fi hotspot; Bluetooth v5.0, A2DP, LE, EDR; USB-C; 3.5mm audio jack
- Model: SM-G885x

The Samsung Galaxy A8 Star is a midrange Android-based smartphone manufactured and marketed by Samsung as part of the Samsung Galaxy A series. It was announced in June 2018 for East and Southeast Asian markets, namely Korea, China and India. In China, it is sold as the Samsung Galaxy A9 Star. It was succeeded by the Samsung Galaxy A40 in May 2019.

== Availability ==
The Galaxy A8 Star is intended for Eastern Asian markets, and as such, it is not sold in Western markets. In India, it is available exclusively through Amazon and retails for Rs34990.

== Specifications ==
=== Hardware ===
The Galaxy A8 Star has a 6.3" 1080p Super AMOLED display and is powered by the Snapdragon 660. It has dual 24 + 16 MP rear cameras and a 24 MP front camera. The A8 Star relies on USB-C and has a 3.5mm audio jack as well as Bluetooth 5. Biometric options include a rear-mounted fingerprint sensor and facial recognition. Externally, the A8 Star has an aluminum frame with glass on both the front and back of the phone.

=== Software ===
The Galaxy A8 Star runs on Android 8 "Oreo" with Samsung Experience 9.0. It eventually got an update to Android 9 "Pie" with One UI 1.1, and Android 10 with One UI 2 a year later.

== Marketing ==
Samsung was criticized for using a DSLR to promote the A8 Star's portrait mode effect.
