= Samsung Galaxy A9 (2018) =

Android smartphone by Samsung

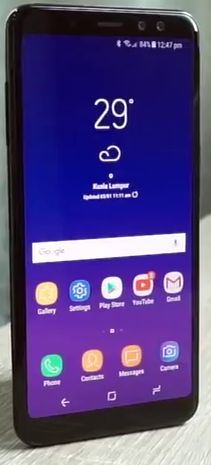
- Galaxy A9 (storefront display)
- Brand: Samsung Galaxy
- Manufacturer: Samsung Electronics
- Type: Phablet
- Series: Galaxy A series
- First released: A9: October 11, 2018; 8 years ago A9s: October 24, 2018; 8 years ago
- Availability by region: A9: November 2018; 8 years ago
- Predecessor: Samsung Galaxy A8 / A8+ (2018); Samsung Galaxy A9 (2016)
- Successor: Samsung Galaxy A80; Samsung Galaxy A71; Samsung Galaxy A90 5G
- Related: Samsung Galaxy A6 / A6+ (2018); Samsung Galaxy A6s; Samsung Galaxy A7 (2018); Samsung Galaxy A8 / A8+ (2018); Samsung Galaxy A8/A9 Star; Samsung Galaxy A8s; Samsung Galaxy S9; Samsung Galaxy Note 9
- Form factor: Slate
- Dimensions: 162.5 × 77 × 7.8 mm
- Weight: 183 g (6 oz)
- Operating system: Original: Android 8.0 "Oreo" with Samsung Experience 9.0 Current: Android 10 with One UI 2.1
- System-on-chip: Qualcomm Snapdragon 660
- CPU: Octa-Core 4x Kryo 260 2.2 GHz & 4x Kryo 260 1.8 GHz
- GPU: Adreno 512
- Memory: 6 GB/8 GB RAM
- Storage: 128 GB
- Removable storage: up to 512 GB
- Battery: 3800mAh (non-removable)
- Rear camera: Primary: 24 MP, f/1.7, 27mm, 1/2.8", 0.9µm, PDAF; Telephoto: 10 MP, f/2.4, 52mm, 1/3.9", 1.0µm, AF, 2x optical zoom; Ultrawide: 8 MP, f/2.4, 12mm, 1/4.0", 1.12µm; Depth: 5 MP, f/2.2, 1/5.0", 1.12µm; LED flash, Panorama, HDR; 4K@30fps, 1080p@30fps
- Front camera: 24 MP, f/2.0, 27mm (wide), 1/2.8", 0.9µm; HDR; 1080p@30fps
- Display: 6.3" Super AMOLED FHD+ display with Gorilla Glass 5 1080×2220 px (18.5:9 Aspect Ratio)
- Connectivity: 802.11 a/b/g/n/ac, Wi-Fi hotspot; Bluetooth v5.0, A2DP, EDR; USB-C v1.0 reversible connector, NFC
- Model: A9: SM-A920x; A9s: SM-A9200x (where 'x' varies by carrier & international models)
- Website: www.samsung.com/global/galaxy/galaxy-a9/

The Samsung Galaxy A9 (2018) is an Android phablet smartphone produced by Samsung Electronics as part of the Samsung Galaxy A series. It was announced on 11 October 2018 at the A Galaxy event in Kuala Lumpur, Malaysia, as the successor to the Samsung Galaxy A9 (2016). The Galaxy A9 (2018) is the world's first smartphone that features 4 different cameras on the rear. It features a 6.3 inch Super AMOLED Infinity Display with slight curved edges similar to the Samsung Galaxy A8 (2018) and supports Dolby Atmos immersive sound technology.

== Specifications ==
The Galaxy A9 (2018) consists of the following specifications.

=== Hardware ===
The smartphone is powered by Qualcomm Snapdragon 660 SoC with an octa-core processor consisting of 4 performance 2.2GHz Kryo 260 and 4 efficient 1.8GHz Kyro 260 cores and Adreno 512 GPU backed by 6 GB/8 GB of RAM and 128 GB of internal storage that is expandable to 512 GB via a dedicated microSD card slot.

==== Display ====
The A9 (2018) features a 6.3 inch Full HD+ (1080x2220 pixels) Super AMOLED display with 18.5:9 aspect ratio. The display features curved edges similar to the S9's Infinity Display but with larger bezels and without curved sides.

==== Cameras ====
The quad camera setup features a primary 24MP f/1.7 sensor for normal photography, an ultra-wide 8MP f/2.4 sensor with a 120 degrees viewing angle, a telephoto 10MP f/2.4 with 2x optical zoom and a 5MP depth sensor for effects such as Bokeh. The front camera has been upgraded to a 24MP sensor, complete with its own dedicated flash.

Video recording is possible with 2160p and 1080p, both at 30 frames per second. The device lacks slow motion video recording.

=== Software ===
==== Operating system ====
It runs Android 8.0 "Oreo" with Samsung Experience 9.0 out of the box. It is upgradable to Android 9.0 Pie.

==== Miscellaneous ====
Its extra features include Bixby, with Bixby button, Always-on Display and a Gorilla Glass front panel with a reflective glass back panel. It is available in Caviar Black, Lemonade Blue and Bubblegum Pink variants, with some models supporting Dual SIM. It supports fast charging over its USB-C port.

== Availability ==
Following the unveiling, Samsung announced that the device will go on sale in selected markets from November 2018 with future plans to release in other countries.

== Galaxy A9s ==
The A9s are similar in design and specifications to the A9, and were destined for sale in the Chinese market only. The addition of an 's' is to differentiate it from the current Samsung Galaxy A9 Star, which is based on the Samsung Galaxy A8 Star and also destined for only the Chinese market.
