= Samsung Galaxy A8s =

Android smartphone manufactured by Samsung Electronics

Samsung Galaxy A8s Samsung Galaxy A9 Pro (2019)
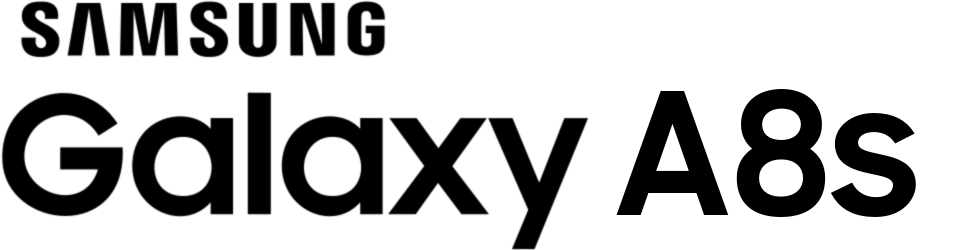

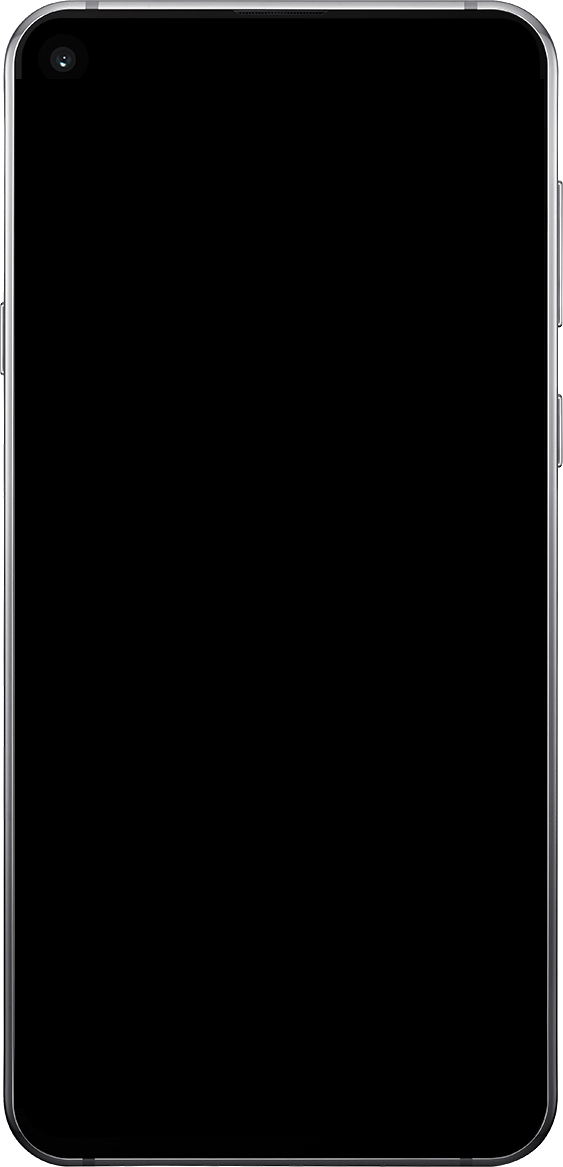
- Brand: Samsung Galaxy
- Manufacturer: Samsung Electronics
- Type: Phablet
- Series: Galaxy A series
- First released: December 10, 2018; 7 years ago
- Availability by region: December 2018; 7 years ago
- Predecessor: Samsung Galaxy A9 Pro (2016)
- Successor: Samsung Galaxy A60
- Related: Samsung Galaxy A6 / A6+ (2018); Samsung Galaxy A6s; Samsung Galaxy A7 (2018); Samsung Galaxy A8 / A8+ (2018); Samsung Galaxy A8/A9 Star; Samsung Galaxy A9 (2018)
- Form factor: Slate
- Dimensions: 159.8 × 76.8 × 7.5 mm
- Weight: 168 g (6 oz)
- Operating system: Original: Android 8.1 "Oreo" with Samsung Experience 9.5 Current: Android 10 with One UI 2.0
- System-on-chip: Qualcomm Snapdragon 710
- CPU: Octa-Core 2x Kyro 360 2.2 GHz & 6x Kyro 360 1.7 GHz
- GPU: Adreno 616
- Memory: 6 GB/8 GB RAM
- Storage: 128 GB
- Removable storage: up to 512 GB
- Battery: 3400mAh (non-removable)
- Rear camera: 24MP, f/1.7 (wide); 10MP, f/2.4 (telephoto); 5MP, f/2.2 (depth) with single flash
- Front camera: 24 MP, f/2.0 (wide)
- Display: 6.4" IPS LCD FHD+ display 2340×1080px (19.5:9 Aspect Ratio)
- Connectivity: 802.11 a/b/g/n/ac, Wi-Fi hotspot; Bluetooth v5.0, A2DP, EDR; USB-C
- Model: SM-G8870

The Samsung Galaxy A8s is an Android-based phablet produced by Samsung Electronics as part of the Samsung Galaxy A series. It was announced on 10 December 2018 primarily for the Chinese market. It was also sold as the Samsung Galaxy A9 Pro (2019) in South Korea.

The A8s is a triple camera smartphone produced by Samsung, featuring 3 different cameras on the rear. A circular hole is punched out in the top left corner of the display for the front camera, branded as the Infinity-O Display. It is also the first Samsung smartphone to not include a headphone jack.

== Specifications ==
The A8s features a 6.4-inch Full HD+ IPS LCD with a 19.5:9 aspect ratio. Unlike previous Samsung A series phones, this device uses a normal LCD panel rather than an AMOLED display. The new Infinity-O display features a full edge to edge display with a 6.7mm round hole punched out in the top left corner for the front camera.

The triple camera setup features a primary 24MP f/1.7 sensor for normal photography, a 10MP f/2.4 telephoto sensor with optical zoom and a 5MP depth sensor for effects such as bokeh. The front camera is a 24MP f/2.0 sensor in a pin-hole punched out in the display.

It runs Android 8.1 "Oreo" with Samsung Experience 9.5 respectively out-of-the box, however it is upgradable to Android 10 with One UI 2.0. The smartphone features an upgraded Qualcomm Snapdragon 710 SoC consisting of 2 performance 2.2GHz Kryo 360 and 6 efficient 1.7GHz Kryo 360 backed by a new Adreno 616 GPU and sports 6 GB or 8 GB of RAM and 128 GB of internal storage, expandable to 512 GB via a MicroSD card, through a dedicated SD card slot.

== Availability ==
Following the unveiling, Samsung announced that the device will go on sale in only in the Chinese market, with no announcement to release in other countries. However, on January 25, 2019, the phone was announced in South Korea as the Galaxy A9 Pro.
