= Samsung Galaxy J4 =

Smartphone

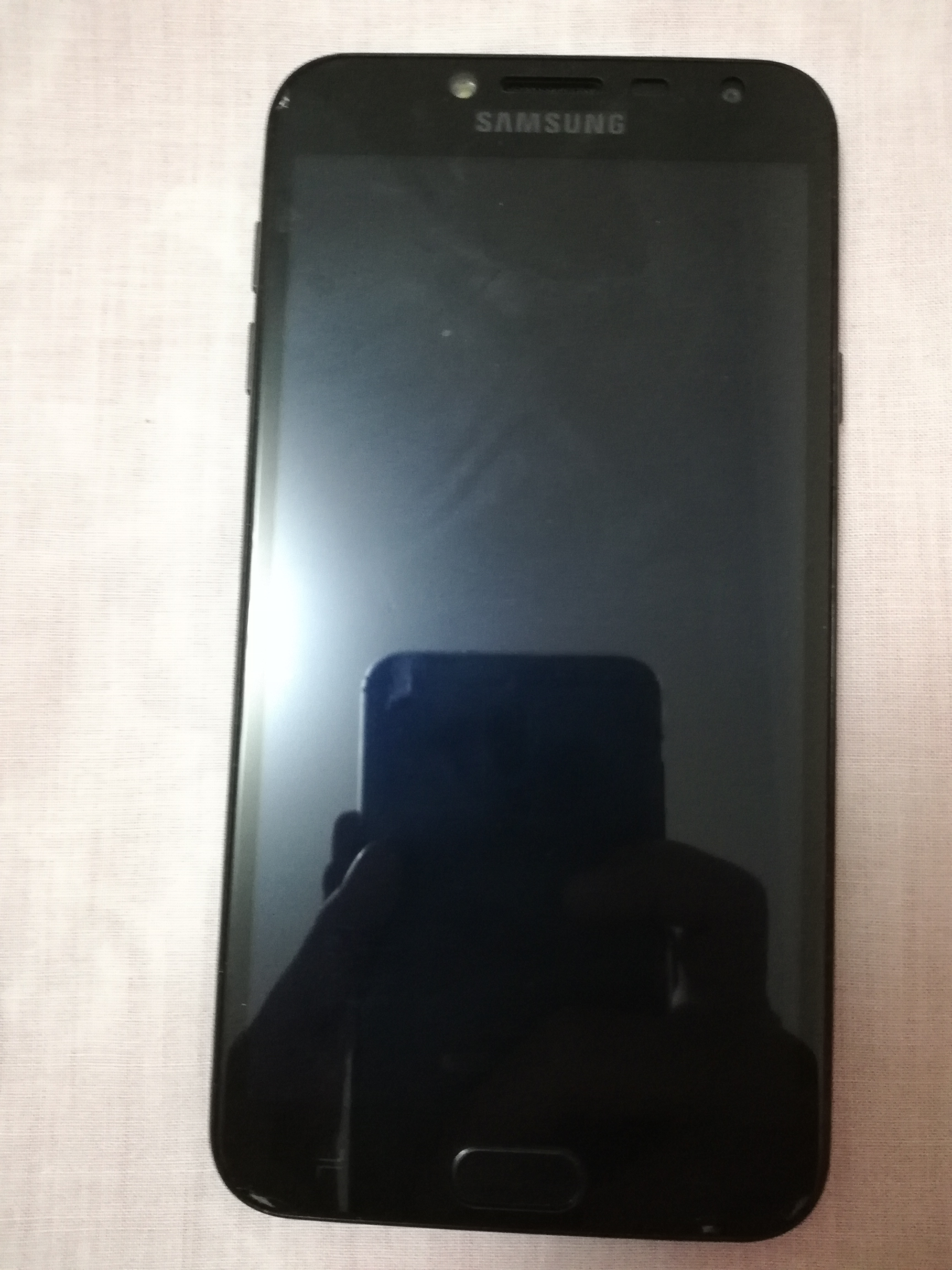
- Samsung Galaxy J4 in Black
- Manufacturer: Samsung Electronics
- Type: Smartphone
- Series: Galaxy J series
- First released: May 22, 2018; 8 years ago
- Discontinued: 2019
- Predecessor: Galaxy J3 (2017)
- Successor: Samsung Galaxy A10
- Related: Galaxy J4+, Galaxy J6, Galaxy J8
- Compatible networks: 2G GSM 850, 900, 1800, 1900; 3G HSDPA 850, 900, 1900, 2100; 4G LTE Bands 1, 3, 5, 7, 8, 20, 38, 40
- Form factor: Slate
- Dimensions: 151.7 mm (5.97 in) H 77.2 mm (3.04 in) W 8.1 mm (0.32 in) D
- Weight: 175 g (6.2 oz)
- Operating system: Original: Android 8.0 "Oreo" with Samsung Experience 9.0; Current: Android 10 with One UI 2.0
- System-on-chip: Exynos 7570
- CPU: Quad-core (4×1.4 GHz) ARM Cortex-A53
- GPU: ARM Mali-T720MP2
- Memory: 2 or 3 GB
- Storage: 16 or 32 GB
- Removable storage: microSD up to 256 GB
- Battery: 3000 mAh - removable
- Charging: 5 Watt ETA0U84IWE Samsung charger
- Rear camera: 13 MP, f/1.9 (Modes: Photo, Video, Pro, Panorama, Night, Continuous, Sports)
- Front camera: 5 MP, f/2.2 (Modes: Photo, Video, Wide Selfie)
- Display: 5.5", 720×1280 px (267 ppi) Super AMOLED
- Connectivity: WLAN 802.11b/g/n, Bluetooth 4.2, GPS/GLONASS, NFC, microUSB 2.0, 3.5 mm headphone jack
- Data inputs: Accelerometer, proximity sensor
- Model: SM-J400x (x varies by carrier and region)
- Other: FM radio, Dual SIM
- Website: Galaxy J4

The Samsung Galaxy J4 is an Android smartphone developed by the South Korean manufacturer Samsung Electronics. Announced and released on May 22, 2018, along with the Samsung Galaxy J6 and the Samsung Galaxy J8, the J4 is the successor to the Galaxy J3.

The Samsung Galaxy J4 did not officially sell as well across Western and Central Europe as in South Korea and Australia because this model may have been deemed too similar to the predecessor, Galaxy J3 (2017)., Galaxy J4+ was released as the replacement for J4. It was perhaps the last Samsung phone incorporating Galaxy S6 design language, albeit with the key symbols from the Experience UI.

== Specifications ==
=== Hardware ===
The Galaxy J4 is powered by an Exynos 7570 SoC including a quad-core 1.4 GHz ARM Cortex-A53 (64 bit) CPU, an ARM Mali-T720MP2 GPU and 2 or 3 GB RAM. The 16 or 32 GB internal storage can be expanded up to 256 GB via microSD card.

The J4 features a 5.5-inch Super AMOLED display with a 720×1280 pixel display resolution and a pixel density of 267 ppi which is protected by 2.5D Glass. The rear camera has a 13 MP sensor with f/1.9 aperture, autofocus, LED flash, panorama and HDR mode. The front camera features 5 MP and f/2.2 aperture.

=== Software ===
The Galaxy J4 originally shipped with Android 8.0 "Oreo" and Samsung's Experience user interface. In 2019, it received the Android 9 Pie update with One UI 1.0. It later received Android 10 with One UI 2.0 in 2020.

== See also ==
- Samsung Galaxy
- Samsung Galaxy J series
