= Samsung Galaxy J7+ =

Mid range Android smartphone

Samsung Galaxy J7+ Samsung Galaxy C7 (2017) Samsung Galaxy C8
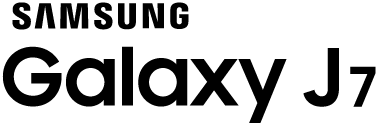
- Brand: Samsung Galaxy
- Manufacturer: Samsung Electronics
- Type: Touchscreen smartphone
- Series: Samsung Galaxy C series Samsung Galaxy J series
- Related: Samsung Galaxy J7 (2017); Samsung Galaxy J7 Pro; Samsung Galaxy C8
- Form factor: Phablet
- Dimensions: 152.4×74.7×7.9 mm (6.00×2.94×0.31 in)
- Weight: 180 g (6 oz)
- Operating system: Android 7.1.1, upgradable to Android 8.1
- System-on-chip: MediaTek Helio P25
- CPU: Octa core processor
- Battery: 3000 mAh non-removable battery
- Rear camera: Dual camera setup: 13 MP main camera (f/1.7 aperture); 5 MP depth sensor (f/1.9 aperture)
- Front camera: 16 MP (f/1.9 aperture)
- Display: 5.5 inch Super AMOLED display (1080x1920 pixels resolution)
- Model: Samsung Galaxy C8: SM-C7100; Samsung Galaxy C7 (2017): SM-C7108; Samsung Galaxy J7+: SM-C710F
- Website: Official website

Samsung Galaxy J7+ is a mid range Android smartphone produced by Samsung Electronics in 2017. It is also known as Samsung Galaxy C7 (2017) and Samsung Galaxy C8. It was unveiled on 2 September 2017.

== Specifications ==
=== Design ===
Samsung Galaxy J7+ has a 5.5-inch display and a metal unibody design. There is a Home button with a built-in fingerprint scanner and two capacitive buttons (recent apps and menu buttons) on the lower bezel of the display while there is a "Samsung" logo, a front-facing camera. an LED flash and sensors on the upper bezel of the display.

At the back panel, there is dual camera setup alongside the "Samsung" logo and the antenna lines. On the side frame; there is a headphone jack, a microUSB port and a microphone at the bottom, there is a volume rocker and a microSIM/microSD card tray at the left, and there is a power button and a speaker at the right.

Galaxy J7+ measures 152.4 mm × 74.7 mm × 7.9 mm and weighs 180 grams. It is available in black and gold.

=== Hardware ===
Samsung Galaxy J7+ has a dual rear camera setup with a 13 MP camera with f/1.7 aperture and a 5 MP depth sensor with f/1.9 aperture. The device has a 16 MP front-facing camera with f/1.9 aperture. Both the dual rear camera setup and the front-facing camera are assisted by LED flash. The depth sensor enables the Live Focus feature.

Galaxy J7+ has a 5.5-inch Super AMOLED display with 1080×1920 pixels resolution. It has 4 GB RAM and 32 GB internal storage that is expandable up to 256 GB by using a microSD card. It has a 3000 mAh non-removable battery.

=== Software ===
Samsung Galaxy J7+ comes with Android 7.1 Nougat and Samsung Experience user interface. Biometric options include the fingerprint scanner and software-based facial recognition. The software also has Always-on-Display and Bixby Home.

In 2018 the Samsung Galaxy J7+ runs Android 8.1 Oreo with Samsung Experience 9.0.

== Samsung Galaxy C8 ==
Samsung Galaxy C8 is a 2017 Android smartphone developed by Samsung Electronics. It was launched September 2017. The phone has 32 GB (expandable up to 256 GB) of internal storage, 3 GB of RAM, and a 1.69 GHz octa-core CPU.

The Samsung Galaxy C8 has 32 GB (expandable up to 256 GB) of internal storage and 3 GB of RAM. A microSD card can be inserted for up to an additional 256 GB of storage. The rear-facing dual cameras have a resolution of 13+5 MP, while the front-facing camera is 16 MP. The phone has a 1.69 GHz octa-core CPU and is also equipped with a fingerprint scanner.

| Preceded by Samsung Galaxy J7 (2017) | Samsung Galaxy J7+ 2017 | Succeeded by Samsung Galaxy J8 |
