= AR Zone =

Software by Samsung Electronics

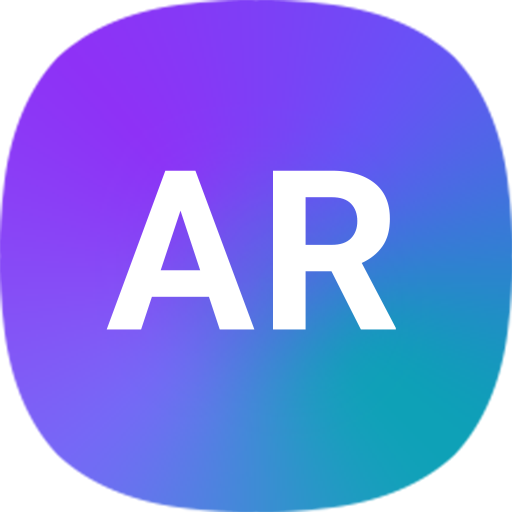

- Developer: Samsung Electronics
- Initial release: February 24, 2020; 5 years ago
- Final release: 1.8.00.21 / July 28, 2023; 2 years ago
- Operating system: Android
- Type: Augmented reality

AR Zone (Korean: AR 존) is an application on Samsung Galaxy smartphones and tablets that consolidates several augmented reality (AR) tools into one app. The app came preloaded on most Galaxy devices running One UI 2.1 until One UI 6.

AR Zone was first released for Samsung Galaxy S20 in 2020, and brought together several augmented reality features that were located in Air Command, AR Emoji (in Camera app) and Bixby Vision. With the release of One UI 7 in 2025, Samsung has dropped the AR Zone app: its existing tools (AR Doodle, Quick Measure, Deco Pic) are now separate apps and not preloaded but are available from the Samsung Galaxy Store. AR Emoji has been renamed to Galaxy Avatar and remains preloaded on its own.

== AR tools ==
The AR Emoji suite included AR Emoji Camera, AR Emoji Studio and AR Emoji Stickers. AR Emoji Studio allowed users to generate animated 3D emoji avatars of themselves through Samsung Camera or Gallery with the use of AR or choose a pre-existing model. The website SamMobile described it as creating "your own Samsung Sam-like avatar", referring to the virtual assistant character that went viral in 2021.

An Avatar/My Emoji can be edited in AR Emoji Studio. Stickers using the Avatar/My Emoji can be created in AR Emoji Stickers. Even though every single emoji created using AR Emoji Camera or AR Emoji Studio creates stickers, it is still possible to create AR Emoji Stickers from scratch or edit the existing ones using editor in AR Emoji Stickers.

AR Doodle is a feature to draw (i.e. doodle) on objects while it is being captured on the device camera. Deco Pic is another feature in the AR Zone for adding frames, stickers and GIFs on an existing photo or video. 3D Scanner, which is available on select devices with a time of flight (ToF) camera, create 3D models of real-world objects. It requires the device camera to scan an object from all directions.

Another tool is Quick Measure which measures area, length, depth and distance of real-world objects, also making use of ToF. Places, Makeup, Home Decor and Styling are other AR features that were discontinued in 2020.
