= Samsung Galaxy A6 =

Android smartphone from Samsung in the medium price segment

Samsung Galaxy A6 / A6+
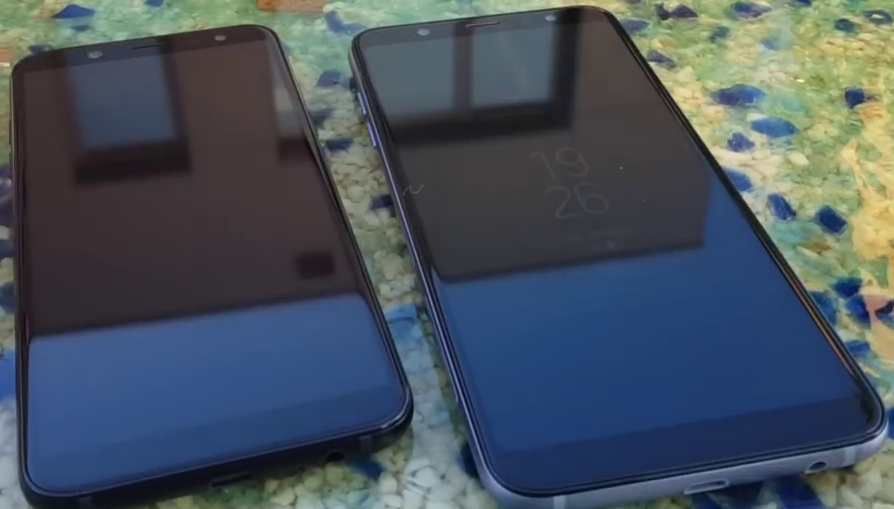
- Samsung Galaxy A6
- Brand: Samsung Galaxy
- Manufacturer: Samsung Electronics
- Series: Galaxy A series
- First released: May 2, 2018; 8 years ago
- Predecessor: Samsung Galaxy A5 (2017); Samsung Galaxy A3 (2017)
- Successor: Samsung Galaxy A6s; Samsung Galaxy A20; Samsung Galaxy A30
- Related: Samsung Galaxy A6s; Samsung Galaxy A7 (2018); Samsung Galaxy A8 / A8+ (2018); Samsung Galaxy A8/A9 Star; Samsung Galaxy A8s; Samsung Galaxy S9; Samsung Galaxy Note 8
- Compatible networks: 2G, 3G (UMTS/HSPA), 4G (LTE Cat 6)
- Form factor: Slate
- Dimensions: A6: 149.9 x 70.8 x 7.7 mm (5.90 x 2.79 x 0.30 inches); A6+: 160.2 x 75.7 x 7.9 (6.31 x 2.98 x 0.31 inches)
- Weight: A6: 159 g (5.61 oz); A6+: 186 g (6.56 oz)
- Operating system: Original: Android 8.0 "Oreo" with Samsung Experience 9.5; Latest: Android 10 with One UI 2
- System-on-chip: A6: Exynos 7870 Octa; A6 (US): Exynos 7884; A6+: Qualcomm Snapdragon 450
- CPU: A6: Octa-core 1.6 GHz Cortex-A53; A6 (US): Octa-core 2x 1.6 GHz Cortex-A73, 6x 1.35 GHz Cortex-A53; A6+: Octa-core 1.8 GHz Cortex-A53
- GPU: A6: Mali-T830 MP1; A6 (US): Mali-G71 MP2; A6+: Adreno 506
- Memory: 3GB / 4GB RAM
- Storage: 32GB / 64GB
- Removable storage: microSD, expandable up to 256 GB
- Battery: A6: Li-Ion 3,000 mAh battery A6+: Li-Ion 3,500 mAh battery
- Rear camera: A6: 16 MP (f/1.7); A6+: 16 MP (f./1.7) + 5 MP (f/1.9); Features: LED Flash, Panorama, HDR
- Front camera: A6: 16 MP (f/1.9); A6+: 24 MP (f/1.9); Features: LED Flash
- Display: A6: 5.6 inches Super AMOLED Infinity Display; A6+: 6.0 inches Super AMOLED Infinity Display
- Model: A6: SM-A600x; A6+: SM-A605x where x depends on carrier and region

The Samsung Galaxy A6 and Samsung Galaxy A6+ are mid range Android-based smartphones produced by Samsung Electronics. They were announced on 2 May 2018 and first released in Europe, Asia, and Latin America on the same month, with South Korea, Africa, and China following later. They had similar hardware design and software features to their respective smaller counterparts, the Galaxy J6 and Galaxy J8, but the latter was rebranded in South Korea as Galaxy Jean and in China as Galaxy A9 Star lite.

== Specifications ==
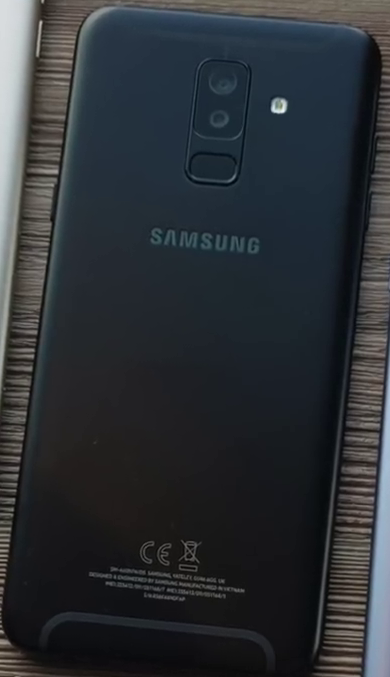
Back of a Samsung Galaxy A6+

=== Hardware ===
The Samsung Galaxy A6 has a 5.6" Super AMOLED Infinity Display with a resolution of 1,480×720. It's powered by the octa-core 1.6 GHz Samsung Exynos 7870 processor. The phone also features a 3,000 mAh battery which does not support fast charging.

The Samsung Galaxy A6+ is a bigger variant of the normal A6 and has a Super AMOLED Infinity Display with a resolution of 2,220×1,080 pixels. It has a 16 MP main camera and a 5 MP depth camera on the rear as well as a 24 MP camera on the front. On board is an octa-core 1.8 GHz Qualcomm Snapdragon 450 processor. The phone also has a 3,500 mAh battery which like the A6 does not support fast charging.

=== Camera ===
The Samsung Galaxy A6 has a 16 MP (f1.7) camera on both the rear and front (f1.9).

The main camera on the Samsung Galaxy A6+ is 24 MPs (f.1.7) which is also accompanied by a 5-MP (f.1.9) camera. On the front is a 16-MP (f.1.7) camera.

=== Software ===
Both the Galaxy A6 and A6+ come with Android Oreo and Samsung Experience 9.5. Around 2019, Samsung then provided an update to Android Pie with One UI. A year later, Samsung updated both phones to Android 10 with One UI 2.
