= Samsung Galaxy S9 =

2018 Android smartphones by Samsung Electronics

Samsung Galaxy S9 series

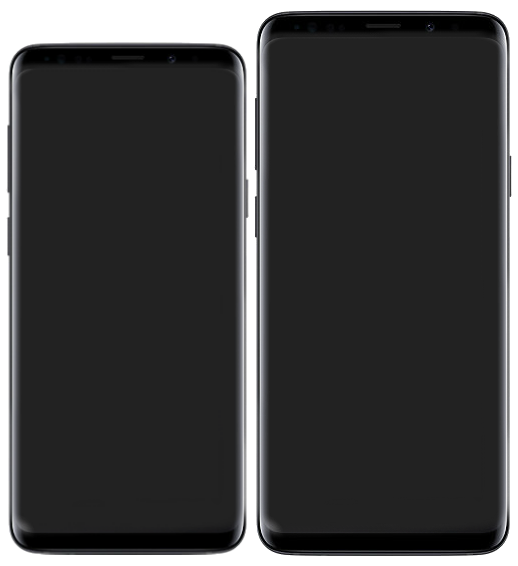
- Samsung Galaxy S9 and S9+
- Brand: Samsung
- Manufacturer: Samsung Electronics
- Type: S9: Smartphone; S9+: Phablet
- Series: Galaxy S
- First released: March 16, 2018; 8 years ago
- Availability by region: 11 March 2018: United Arab Emirates; 16 March 2018: Australia; Canada; European Union; Fiji; India; Indonesia; Lebanon; Malaysia; Philippines; Russia; Singapore; South Africa; Trinidad and Tobago; United Kingdom; United States; Pakistan; Egypt; Bangladesh; 25 March 2018: Sri Lanka; 10 million units sold 6 April 2018: Bahamas
- Discontinued: February 20, 2019; 7 years ago
- Predecessor: Samsung Galaxy S8
- Successor: Samsung Galaxy S10
- Related: Samsung Galaxy Note 9; Samsung Galaxy A9 (2018)
- Compatible networks: 2G, 3G, 4G, 4G LTE
- Form factor: Slate
- Colors: Midnight Black, Coral Blue, Titanium Gray, Lilac Purple, Burgundy Red, Sunrise Gold, Ice Blue, Polaris Blue
- Dimensions: S9: 147.7 mm × 68.7 mm × 8.5 mm (5.81 in × 2.70 in × 0.33 in); S9+: 158.1 mm × 73.8 mm × 8.5 mm (6.22 in × 2.91 in × 0.33 in)
- Weight: S9: 163 g (5.7 oz); S9+: 189 g (6.7 oz)
- Operating system: Original: Samsung Experience 9.0 on top of Android 8.0 "Oreo"; Final: One UI 2.5 on top of Android 10; Unofficial: LineageOS 23.0 on top of Android 16
- System-on-chip: Global: Exynos 9810; USA/Canada/China/HK/Japan/Latin America: Qualcomm Snapdragon 845
- CPU: Exynos: Octa-core (4×2.7 GHz & 4×1.7 GHz); Snapdragon: Octa-core (4×2.8 GHz & 4×1.7 GHz) Kryo 385
- GPU: Exynos: Mali-G72 MP18; Snapdragon: Adreno 630
- Memory: S9: 4 GB LPDDR4X RAM; S9+: 6 GB LPDDR4X RAM
- Storage: 64, 128 or 256 GB UFS 2.1 (UFS 2.0 in some devices)
- Removable storage: microSD, expandable up to 400 GB
- Battery: Non-Removable: S9: 3000 mAh; S9+: 3500 mAh - both with 15W charging speed (Qualcomm Quick Charge 2.0)
- Rear camera: S9: Sony IMX345; Samsung Isocell S5K2L3 12 MP (1.4 μm, f/1.5/2.4), OIS, 4K at 30 fps (limited to 10 min) or 60 fps (limited to 5 min), QHD at 30 fps, 1080p at 60 fps (limited 10 min) or 30 fps, 720p at 30 and super slow motion at 960 fps (for 0.2 seconds). S9+: Sony IMX345; Samsung Isocell S5K2L3 Dual 12 MP (1.4 μm, f/1.5/2.4) + 12 MP ((1.0 μm), f/2.4), Dual OIS, 4K at 30 or 60 fps (limited to 5 min), QHD at 30 fps, 1080p at 30 or 60 fps, 720p at 30 fps and super slow motion at 960 fps (for 0.2 seconds).
- Front camera: Sony IMX320; Samsung Isocell S5K31 8 MP (1.22 μm, f/1.7), autofocus
- Display: 2960×1440 1440p Super AMOLED capacitive touchscreen Infinity Display; Gorilla Glass 5; S9: 5.8 in (150 mm), 570 ppi; S9+: 6.2 in (160 mm), 529 ppi; (both Diamond PenTile)
- Sound: Stereo speakers tuned by AKG, Dolby Atmos surround sound
- Connectivity: Wi-Fi 802.11 a/b/g/n/ac (2.4/5 GHz), VHT80, MU-MIMO, 1024-QAM Bluetooth 5.0 (LE up to 2 Mbit/s), ANT+, USB-C, 3.5mm headphone jack, NFC, location (GPS, Galileo, GLONASS, BeiDou) 2G, 3G, LTE, LTE-A
- Data inputs: Sensors: Accelerometer; Barometer; Fingerprint scanner (rear-mounted); Iris scanner; Magnetometer; Gyroscope; Hall sensor; Proximity sensor; Heart Rate and Blood Oxygen sensor; Other: Physical sound volume keys; Bixby key
- Water resistance: IP68, up to 1.5 m (4.9 ft) for 30 minutes
- Model: International models: SM-G960x (S9); SM-G965x (S9+); (last letter varies by carrier and international models); Japanese models: SCV38 (au, S9); SC-02K (NTT Docomo, S9); SCV39 (au, S9+); SC-03K (NTT Docomo, S9+)
- Codename: S9: Star; S9: Star 2
- Website: www.samsung.com/global/galaxy/galaxy-s9/

The Samsung Galaxy S9 and S9+ are Android-based smartphones unveiled, manufactured, released and marketed by Samsung Electronics as part of the Galaxy S series. The devices were revealed at the Mobile World Congress in Barcelona on 25 February 2018, as the successors to the Galaxy S8 and S8+. Released on 16 March 2018, it is the last Galaxy S series line to only have 4G network support. It is also the last Galaxy S series line to feature a physical fingerprint sensor, an iris scanner, a notification light, and traditional bezels instead of a punch-hole display. The S9+ was also the first model in the Galaxy S series to have a dual rear camera setup, while the S9 was the last to only feature a single rear camera setup.

The Galaxy S9 and S9+ come with the same display sizes and aspect ratios as the S8 and S8+. One notable change is the relocation of the fingerprint sensor, which moved underneath the camera (similar to the A series around that time), while the S8's was located beside it. In addition, the S9 line features several camera improvements over the S8.

The phones received generally favorable reviews, with praise for their enhanced cameras and better-positioned fingerprint scanner, while the similarity to their predecessor models was criticized. It was available in seven colors (Lilac Purple, Midnight Black, Titanium Gray, Coral Blue, Sunrise Gold, Burgundy Red, and Polaris Blue). The Galaxy S9 line was succeeded by the Galaxy S10 line in March 2019.

== Launch ==
Many Galaxy S9 features and design changes were leaked weeks before the official launch, and the official launch video was leaked a few hours before the unveiling.

The Galaxy S9 and S9+ were revealed at the Mobile World Congress in Barcelona on 25 February 2018, as the successors to the Samsung Galaxy S8 and S8+.

== Specifications ==
=== Hardware ===
==== Display ====
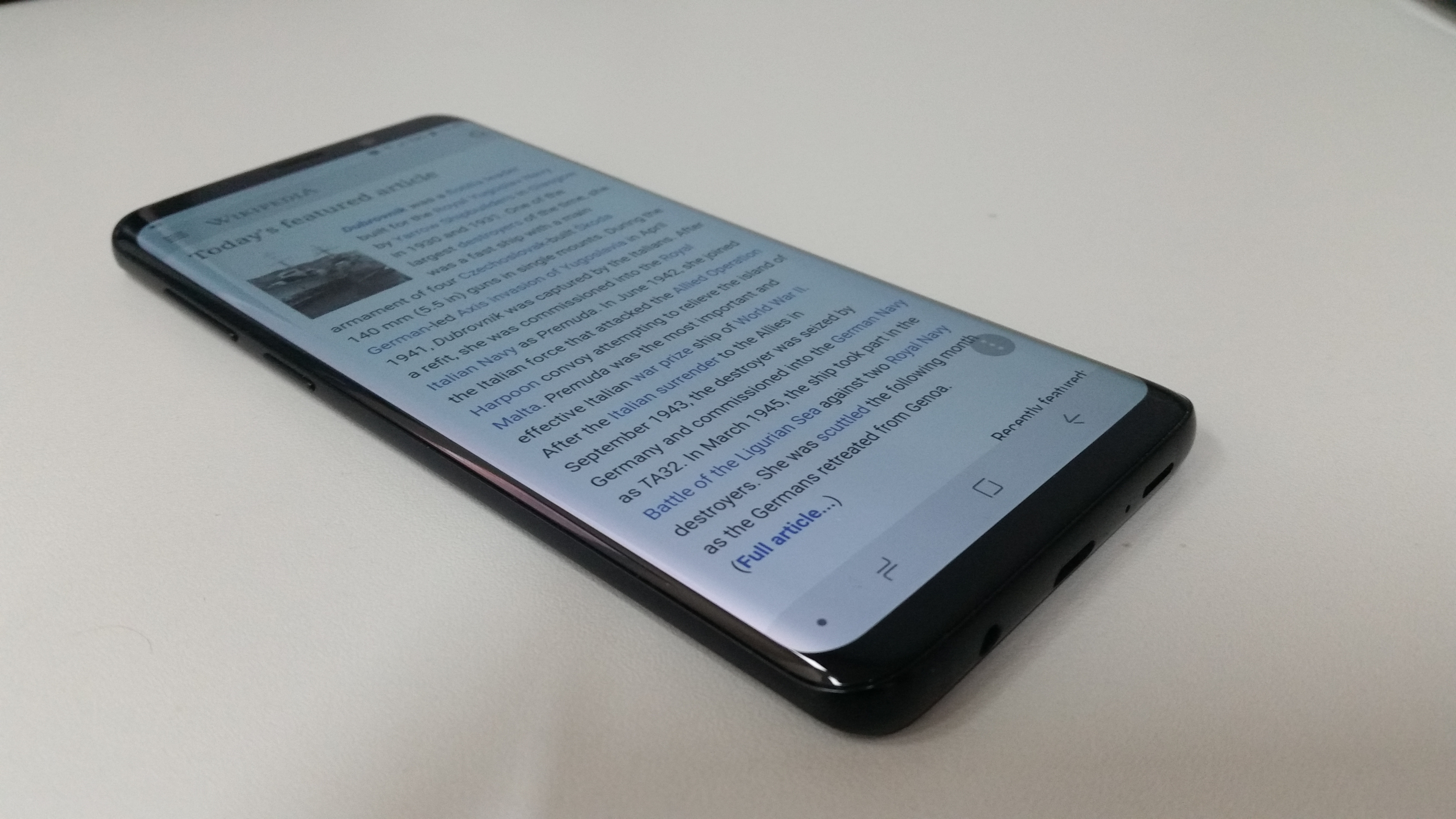
A Samsung Galaxy S9+ displaying the Main Page of the English Wikipedia, prominently showing its curved screen

From the front, the Galaxy S9 and S9+ look identical to the S8 and S8+. They both feature 1440p Super AMOLED displays, with an 18.5:9 aspect ratio. The S9 has a 5.8-inch (15 cm) panel, while the S9+ uses a larger 6.2-inch (16 cm) panel. The displays have curved sides that slope over the horizontal edges of the device. Both models support HDR and have a peak brightness of 864 nits.

The Galaxy S9 and S9+ are the last Galaxy S models to feature a pressure-sensitive home button embedded under the display as this was removed with the Galaxy S10 line. This feature was introduced with the Galaxy S8 and S8+ to ease the transition away from a physical home button by giving users haptic feedback.

==== Cameras ====
Backside of a Galaxy S9+ showing the dual rear camera setup

The cameras on both phones received improvements. Like the Galaxy Note 8, the S9+ has a dual-lens camera setup on the back (a first in the Galaxy S series), while the S9 only has a single camera on the back. The Galaxy S9 was also the last Galaxy S model to feature a single rear camera setup, as all following Galaxy S models used at least a dual camera setup.

The Exynos variants of the phones received Samsung's in-house ISOCELL S5K2L3 camera sensor whereas the Snapdragon variant made use of Sony's Exmor IMX345 counterpart. Both phones have a Dual Aperture rear camera which can switch between f/1.5 and f/2.4, depending on lighting conditions, making it the first mobile phone since the Nokia N86 (2009) to feature a variable aperture camera (excluding hybrid camera phones such as the Samsung Galaxy S4 Zoom and K Zoom).

The phones can record video with 4K (2160p) at 60 frames per second, increasing smoothness compared to 30 frames per second, but with a five-minute time limit. The frame rate at 1080p was quadrupled to 240fps. A "super slow motion" mode was added as well, allowing 720p video capture at 960 frames per second for 0.2 seconds. All three are featured on a Samsung flagship phone for the first time. The first two frame rates are the first increase in the series since the 2014 Samsung Galaxy S5.

AR Emoji, similar to Apple's Animoji feature on the iPhone X, is a new feature that lets the user make emojis based on themselves with the help of augmented reality face recognition. Third-party app support is provided for this feature. The feature has been criticized for its quality of expressions compared to Apple's Animoji.

A software update retrofitted the Galaxy Note 9 feature of warning the user about flaws in photos such as blinking eyes and blur.

==== Chipsets and storage ====
In most countries, the S9 and S9+ both come with a Samsung Exynos 9810 SoC. Versions sold in the United States, Canada, China, Hong Kong, Japan, and Latin America come with the Qualcomm Snapdragon 845 SoC instead.

The S9 comes with 4 GB of RAM, while the S9+ comes with 6 GB. Both devices came initially only with 64 GB of internal storage; variants with 128 and 256 GB were released in May 2018, after the internal storage of 64 GB was criticized by many as being too low, but they could only be ordered via Samsung's website. Both phones feature the ability to use a microSD card to expand the storage to a maximum of 400 GB.

==== Batteries ====
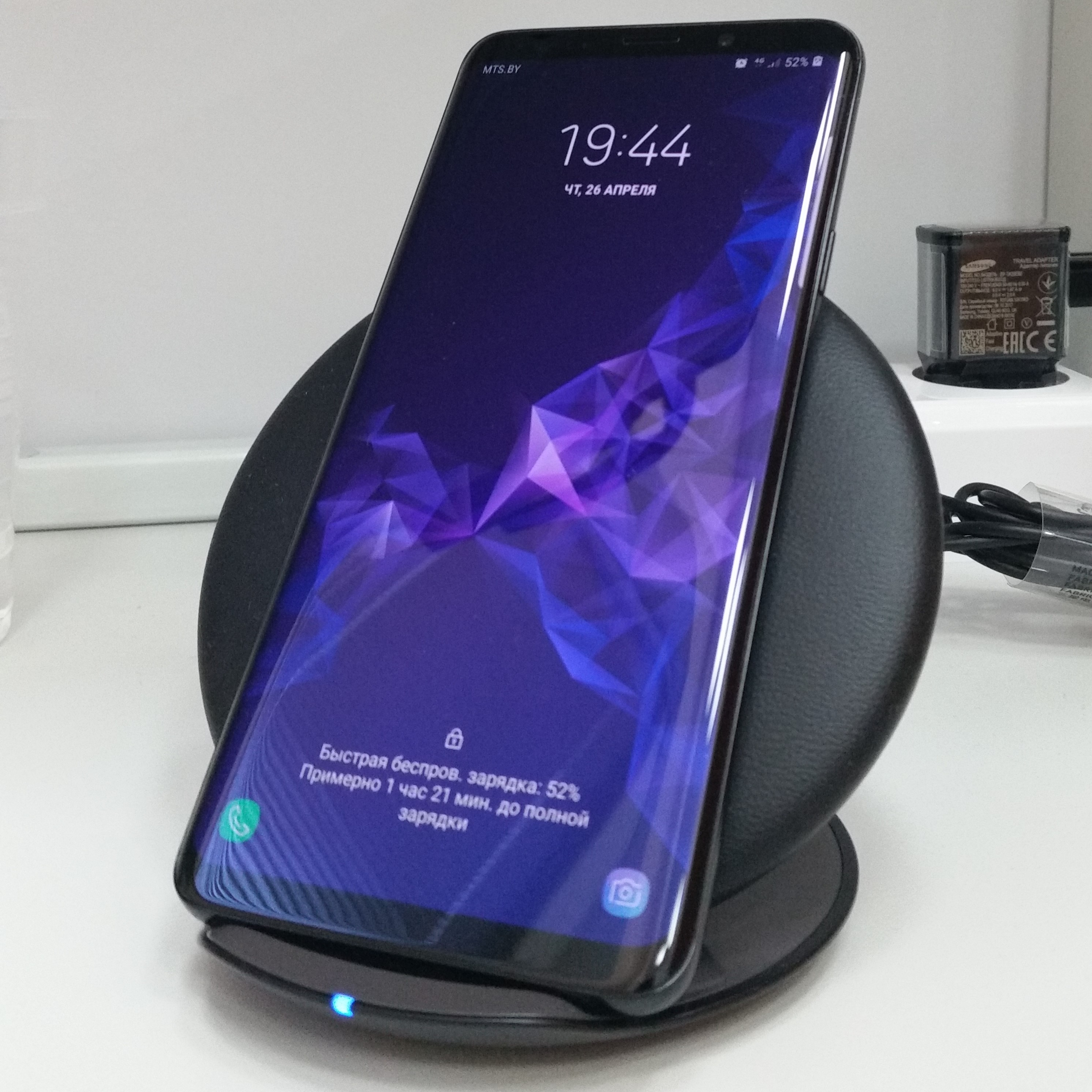
A Samsung Galaxy S9+ being charged wirelessly

The battery capacities are the same as their predecessors, namely 3000 mAh for the S9, and 3500 mAh for the S9+. The batteries are not user-replaceable. Just like its predecessor, the S9 supports AirFuel Inductive (formerly PMA) and Wireless Power Consortium's Qi wireless charging standards.

Wired charging allows for rates up to 15 W via Qualcomm Quick Charge 2.0, while wireless charging is possible with rates up to 10 W.

==== Audio ====
The S9 and S9+ have stereo speakers tuned by AKG, as well as Dolby Atmos surround sound support; furthermore, the S9 and S9+ are two of the few smartphones that still retain the 3.5mm headphone jack.

==== Exterior ====
Where the S9 and S9+ have the most noticeable change from the S8 line is on the back of the phone. The fingerprint sensor has been moved from the right of the camera to a more centralized location just below the camera like on the Galaxy A8 and A8+ for convenience. A more secure unlocking method has been added, where face recognition and iris scanning have been merged into one and called Intelligent Scan.

There are also several construction improvements compared to S8 and S8+ models, mostly to increase physical durability, such as thicker glass, thicker metal rim and different (less prone to deformation) metal alloy used for the frame.

=== Software ===
The S9 and S9+ ship with Android 8.0 "Oreo", with Google Mobile Services and the Samsung Experience user interface and software suite. It is mainly unchanged over the versions found on the S8 and Note 8, but adds additional features such as new customization options, live language translation in the camera app, and landscape (horizontal) orientation support for the Samsung home screen, a lack of which the Galaxy S3 has been criticized for, including by Evan Blass, in 2012.

The S9 and S9+ also support Project Treble, making it easier to update than previous generations of Galaxy Devices.

In December 2018, Samsung began to release Android 9.0 "Pie" for the S9. This update introduces a major revamp of Samsung's Android user experience known as One UI. A main design element of One UI is intentional repositioning of key user interface elements in stock apps to improve usability on large screens: many apps include large headers that push the beginning of content towards the center of the display, while navigation controls and other prompts are often displayed near the bottom of the display instead. In February 2020, Samsung started to roll out the Android 10 update with One UI 2.0 to all Samsung Galaxy S9 devices. The Galaxy S9 series reached its end of life in April 2022 with the April 2022 security patch.

Despite being available, unofficially supported versions of One UI include Android 13 with One UI 5.1, available via the FloydROM for the S9 and Note 9 series, and Android 15 with One UI 7, available via the NobleROM / DuhanROM for the S9 and Note 9 series.

== Advertising ==
In mid-2018, Samsung published a series of mockery commercials named "Ingenius" against iPhones' lack of the Galaxy S9's functionality, including an audio connector, memory card expandable storage, as well as allegedly inferior network transfer rates and camera performance.

In one of those commercials, an unhappy customer failed to locate a memory card slot on her iPhone, to which the Apple Store employee told her that the device lacks such, and suggested her in one word to rely on cloud storage as storage expansion instead, even though it depends on Internet access to function and has slow transfer rates and high latency compared to memory cards. The customer stated that she did not "want her stuff up there", but locally, to which the Apple store employee suggested purchasing a model with more internal storage.

== Reception ==
John McCann from TechRadar complimented the improved camera and the new location of the fingerprint sensor, but criticized that it was too similar to its predecessor (Galaxy S8) and had limited AR Emoji functionality.

Brian Heater of TechCrunch reviewed the S9+ on 8 March 2018, and said that the phone is built on the "success [of the S8] in a number of ways".

Computerworld gave the phone a positive review and said it was "measurably better than its predecessor", but did note there was not a new feature that was particularly "exciting". PC Magazine also gave the Galaxy S9 and S9+ positive reviews.

CNBC's Todd Haselton said on 8 March that the S9+ was superior to the S9, for reasons such as the larger screen and second camera, as well as more RAM and battery power.

Samuel Gibbs from The Guardian gave the S9+ 5/5 stars, with the headline it was "the best big-screen smartphone by miles". Screen and camera were praised, but the review noted battery life could be better. He also appreciated the inclusion of a headphone jack, despite many other phones not having one.

The larger S9+'s camera received a score of 99 from DxOMark, which, at the time, was the highest score awarded by them to a mobile device camera. It was soon surpassed by the Huawei P20 and P20 Pro, which scored 102 and 109, respectively.

Dan Seifert of The Verge gave the S9 a score of 8.5, stating that its performance, camera and design were satisfactory. However, he was not amused by the average battery life and the addition of Bixby, also saying that Samsung has a poor history of updating their smartphones.

Ryan Whitwam from Forbes noted that, in 2018, the 6 GB RAM of the S9+, compared to the 4 GB of the S9, is "unlikely [to] [...] make any difference in daily usage" because "Android doesn't benefit from 6 GB of RAM right now. Maybe in the future, but not now."

=== Sales ===
Samsung has described the sales of the Galaxy S9 as "slow" in their Q2 2018 earning report. Analysts predicted that the phone would be the worst-selling Galaxy S flagship since the Samsung Galaxy S5. During its first two sales quarters, a record low 19.2 million units were sold.

== Issues ==
=== Touchscreen issues ===
About a week after the release of the devices, users started experiencing an issue in the touchscreen, where it would fail to register input in any particular area of the screen, even after a factory reset. This was termed as "dead zones" by the users. Samsung has responded by issuing a statement that they were "looking into a limited number of reports of Galaxy S9/S9+ touchscreen responsiveness issues".

=== Black Crush issues ===
Some users of the Galaxy S9 have reported the so-called "Black Crush" issues, where the display has issues displaying different shades of dark colors. Samsung has responded with a statement that they are aware of "a limited number of reports of Galaxy S9/S9+ displaying dark colors differently than intended in certain instances" but has not provided an official fix for it yet.

=== Battery life issues ===
Many users with the Exynos variant of the phone experienced subpar battery life. Analysts discovered that the four Samsung-designed cores had been poorly tuned, resulting in decreased battery life. This issue, however, has been addressed in part with the release of the August 2018 update.

=== Exynos 9810 performance ===
In previous Galaxy S phones, the Exynos processor performed similar to the Snapdragon version. The S9 powered by the Exynos 9810 performed relatively slow for a flagship and compared to the Snapdragon-powered S9. This was not very evident in synthetic benchmarks, but more so in benchmarks that simulated real world performance, such as PCMark.

== See also ==
- Samsung Galaxy

Preceded by Samsung Galaxy S8	Samsung Galaxy S9; 2018	Succeeded by Samsung Galaxy S10
