= Samsung Galaxy A40 =

2019 smartphone by Samsung Electronics

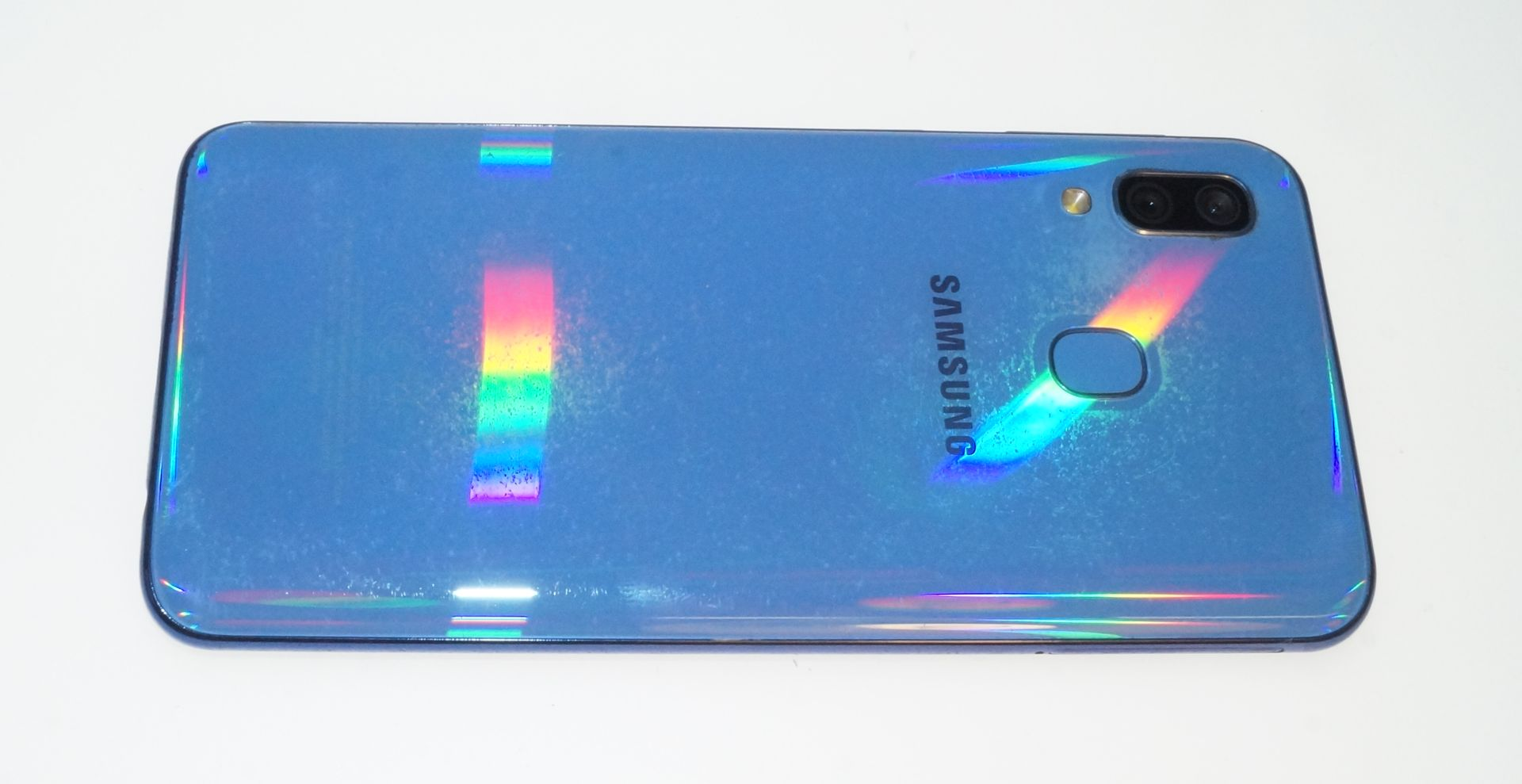
- Back of the Samsung Galaxy A40
- Brand: Samsung Galaxy
- Manufacturer: Samsung Electronics
- Type: Smartphone
- Series: Samsung Galaxy A series
- First released: 10 April 2019; 7 years ago
- Availability by region: 10 April 2019; 7 years ago (Netherlands)
- Predecessor: Samsung Galaxy J6
- Successor: Samsung Galaxy A41
- Related: Samsung Galaxy A30; Samsung Galaxy A30s; Samsung Galaxy A50
- Compatible networks: 2G; 3G; 4G LTE
- Form factor: Slate
- Dimensions: 144.4 mm (5.69 in) H 69.2 mm (2.72 in) W 7.9 mm (0.31 in) D
- Weight: 140 g (4.9 oz)
- Operating system: Original: Android 9.0 "Pie" with One UI 1.1; Currently: Android 11 with One UI 3.1
- System-on-chip: Samsung Exynos 7 Octa 7904
- CPU: Octa-core (2x1.8 GHz Cortex-A73 & 6x1.6 GHz Cortex-A53)
- GPU: Mali-G71 MP2
- Memory: 4 GB RAM
- Storage: 64 GB
- Battery: 3100 mAh
- Rear camera: 16 MP, f/1.7 aperture, PDAF (Wide-angle); 5 MP, f/2.2 aperture, 12mm (Ultra-wide angle)
- Front camera: 25 MP, f/2.0 aperture
- Display: 5.9 in (150 mm) 1080 x 2340 px (437 ppi) Super AMOLED Gorilla Glass 3; 19.5:9 aspect ratio
- Sound: Loudspeaker, 3.5mm headphone jack
- Connectivity: Wi-Fi: 802.11 a/b/g/n/ac Wi-Fi Direct; Wi-Fi hotspot Bluetooth: 5.0; USB: 2.0, Type-C 1.0 reversible connector
- Data inputs: Sensors: Accelerometer; Proximity sensor; Fingerprint scanner (Rear-mounted); Gyroscope; Compass; Hall sensor
- Model: SM-A405FN/DS
- Codename: a40
- SAR: Head: 0.49 W/kg; Body: 1.34 W/kg

The Samsung Galaxy A40 is a mid-range Android-based smartphone developed and manufactured by Samsung Electronics. The device was announced on March 19, 2019, and was released in Europe on April 10, 2019.

== Specifications ==
=== Design ===
Similar to the Galaxy A50 and the Galaxy A70, it features a plastic back, plastic frame, and glass front (Corning Gorilla Glass 3).

Galaxy A40
- Black
- White
- Blue
- Coral

=== Hardware ===
==== Display ====
The device has a 5.9" FHD+ (2340 x 1080) 60 Hz Super AMOLED Infinity-U display, with an 19.5:9 aspect ratio.

==== Battery ====
It has a 3100 mAh battery and supports 15W Fast Charging.

==== Processor and memory ====
The device uses the Exynos 7904 chipset (also used on the Galaxy A30), and is only sold with 64GB of storage (which uses eMMC 5.1) and 4GB of RAM and is expandable to up to 512GB of external storage via the microSD card slot.

==== Camera ====
It has a dual rear camera setup with a 16 MP (f/1.7) main camera and a 5 MP (f/2.2) ultra-wide camera. The front camera uses a 25 MP sensor.

=== Software ===
The device originally shipped with Android 9.0 Pie and One UI 1.1. It was eligible for 2 OS upgrades and 4 years of security updates.

	Pre-installed OS	OS Upgrades history		End of support
	Pre-installed OS	1st	2nd	End of support
A40	Android 9 Pie (One UI 1.1)	Android 10 (One UI 2.0); March 2020	Android 11 (One UI 3.0); March 2021	May 2023
