= Samsung Galaxy A8 (2018) =

2018 Android smartphone

Samsung Galaxy A8 (2018) Samsung Galaxy A8+ (2018)
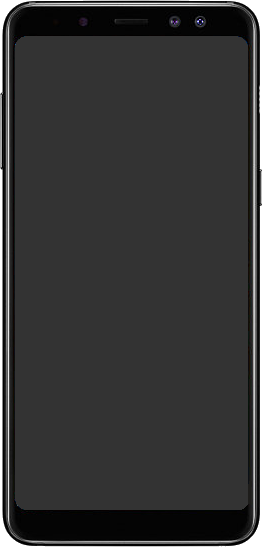
- Brand: Samsung Galaxy
- Manufacturer: Samsung Electronics
- Type: Smartphone
- Series: Galaxy A series
- First released: December 17, 2017; 8 years ago
- Availability by region: January 2018; 8 years ago
- Predecessor: Samsung Galaxy A8 (2016); Samsung Galaxy A5 (2017); Samsung Galaxy A7 (2017)
- Successor: Samsung Galaxy A8s; Samsung Galaxy A9 (2018); Samsung Galaxy A50 (A8); Samsung Galaxy A70 (A8+)
- Related: Samsung Galaxy A6/Samsung Galaxy A6+ (2018); Samsung Galaxy A6s; Samsung Galaxy A7 (2018); Samsung Galaxy A8 Star/Samsung Galaxy A9 Star; Samsung Galaxy A8s; Samsung Galaxy A9 (2018); Samsung Galaxy S8; Samsung Galaxy Note 8 Samsung Galaxy Feel 2
- Compatible networks: GSM / HSPA / LTE
- Form factor: Slate
- Dimensions: A8: H: 149.2 mm (5.87 in); W: 70.6 mm (2.78 in); D: 8.4 mm (0.33 in); A8+: H: 159.9 mm (6.30 in); W: 75.7 mm (2.98 in); D: 8.3 mm (0.33 in)
- Weight: A8: 172 g (6.1 oz); A8+: 191 g (6.7 oz)
- Operating system: Original: Android 7.1.1 "Nougat" with Samsung Experience 8.5; Current: Android 9 "Pie" with One UI 1.0
- System-on-chip: Exynos 7885 Octa
- CPU: Octa-core (2x2.2 GHz Cortex-A73 & 6x1.6 GHz Cortex-A53)
- GPU: Mali-G71
- Memory: A8: 4 GB RAM; A8+: 4 or 6 GB RAM
- Storage: 32 or 64 GB
- Removable storage: microSD, up to 256 GB
- Battery: Both: Non-removable; A8: 3,000 mAh; A8+: 3,500 mAh
- Rear camera: 16 MP, f/1.7, phase detection autofocus, LED flash, 1080p video at 30fps
- Front camera: Dual 16 MP + 8 MP, f/1.9, 1080p video @ 30FPS
- Display: A8: 5.6 in (140 mm) 1080p AMOLED, ~441ppi with Gorilla Glass 4 A8+: 6 in (150 mm) 1080p AMOLED, ~410ppi with Gorilla Glass 4
- Data inputs: Accelerometer; Barometer; Electronic compass; Fingerprint scanner (rear-mounted); Gyroscope; Proximity sensor; RGB light sensor; Touchscreen
- Model: SM-A530 (A8); SM-A730 (A8+); (Last letter varies by carrier and international models)
- Website: Official Website

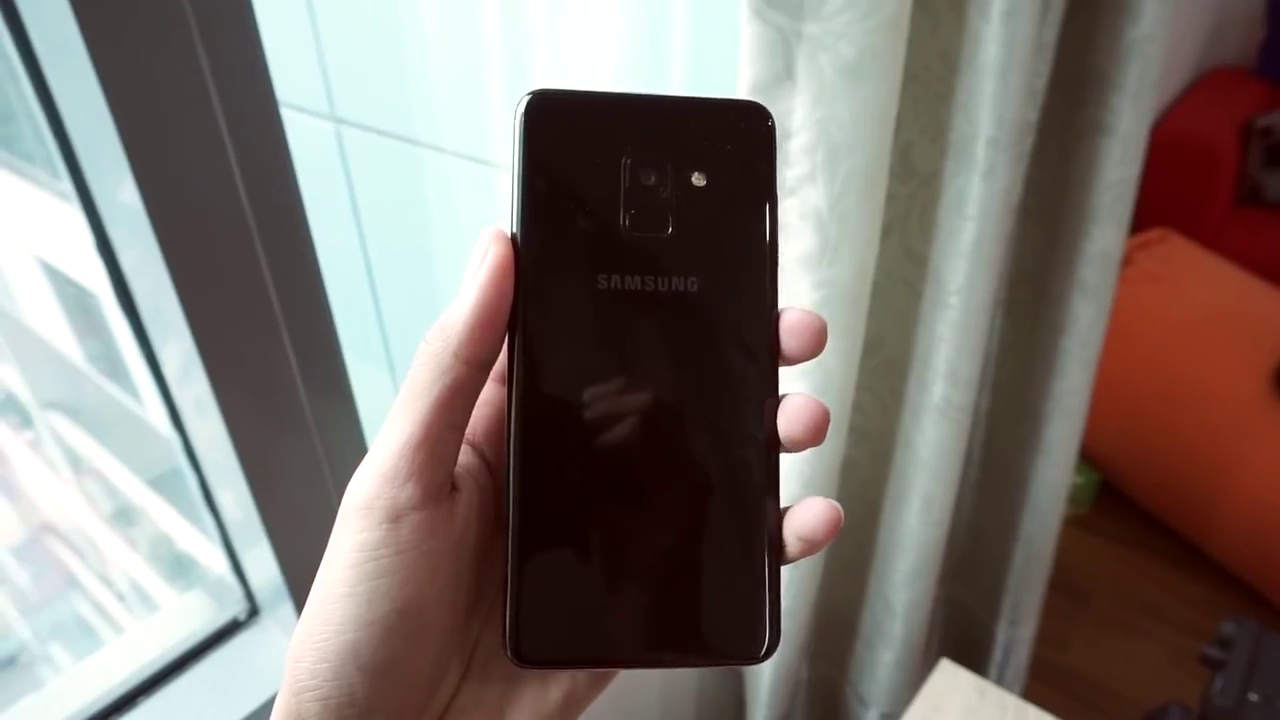
Rear of the Samsung Galaxy A8 (2018)

The Samsung Galaxy A8 and Samsung Galaxy A8+ (2018) are upper-midrange Android-based smartphones produced by Samsung Electronics. They were announced on 19 December 2017. The devices run Android 7.1.1 "Nougat" out-of-the-box with Samsung Experience 8.5.

== Product positioning ==
As a less expensive alternative to the flagship Samsung Galaxy S8/S8+, the midrange A8/A8+ has a similar "Infinity Display" design aesthetic with an 18.5:9 panel and narrow bezels. However, the A8's display is an FHD+ resolution flat panel, compared to the S8's QHD+ curved panel.

=== Variants ===
Model	Processor	SIM	Region
SM-A530F	Samsung Exynos; 7 Octa 7885	Single	Europe
SM-A530F/DS	Samsung Exynos; 7 Octa 7885	Dual	Europe, Asia, Africa, Latin America, Oceania, Middle East
SM-A530N	Samsung Exynos; 7 Octa 7885	Single	South Korea
SM-A530W	Samsung Exynos; 7 Octa 7885	Single	Canada
SM-A730F/DS	Samsung Exynos; 7 Octa 7885	Dual	Asia, Africa, Latin America, Oceania, Middle East
