= Samsung Galaxy Note 9 =

2018 Android phablet by Samsung

Samsung Galaxy Note9

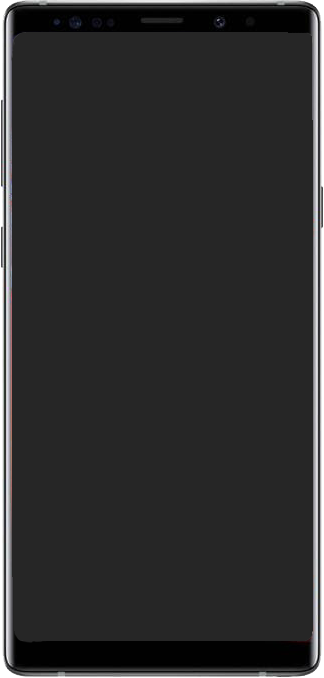
- Front of the Samsung Galaxy Note 9
- Brand: Samsung
- Manufacturer: Samsung Electronics
- Type: Smartphone
- Series: Galaxy Note
- Family: Samsung Galaxy
- First released: 24 August 2018; 8 years ago
- Availability by region: 23 August 2018: Indonesia; 24 August 2018: United Kingdom; United States; Singapore
- Units sold: 9.6 million units
- Predecessor: Samsung Galaxy Note 8
- Successor: Samsung Galaxy Note 10
- Related: Samsung Galaxy S9; Samsung Galaxy A9 (2018)
- Compatible networks: 2G, 3G, 4G LTE
- Form factor: Slate
- Colors: Metallic Copper, Lavender Purple, Ocean Blue, Midnight Black, Pure White, Alpine White
- Dimensions: H: 161.9 mm (6.37 in); W: 76.4 mm (3.01 in); D: 8.8 mm (0.35 in)
- Weight: 201 g (7.1 oz)
- Operating system: Original: Android Oreo 8.1 with Samsung Experience 9.5; Current: Android 10 with One UI 2.5; Unofficial: Up to Android 15 with One UI 7.0, Noble ROM
- System-on-chip: Australia, United Kingdom and the rest of the world: Samsung Exynos 9810; North America, China, Hong Kong, Japan and Latin America: Qualcomm Snapdragon 845
- CPU: Exynos: Octa-core (4x2.7 GHz Cortex-A55 & 4x1.7 GHz Mongoose M3); Snapdragon: Octa-core (4x2.8 GHz Kryo 385 Gold & 4x1.7 GHz Kryo 385 Silver)
- GPU: Exynos: Mali-G72 MP18; Snapdragon: Adreno 630
- Modem: Exynos: Cat.18 LTE; Snapdragon: Snapdragon X20 LTE
- Memory: 6 GB (128 GB model) 8 GB (512 GB model)
- Storage: 128 GB or 512 GB UFS 2.1
- Removable storage: microSD card support up to 512 GB
- SIM: 1x or 2x nanoSIM
- Battery: 4000 mAh (non user-replaceable)
- Charging: Wired: Qualcomm Quick Charge 2.0 (15 W); Qi wireless charging at 15 W
- Rear camera: Dual 12 MP (1.4 μm, f/1.5/2.4) + 12 MP ((1.0 μm), f/2.4), Dual OIS, 4K at 30 or 60 fps (limited to 5 min)[1], QHD at 30 fps, 1080p at 30 or 60 fps, 720p at 30 fps and slow motion at 960 fps
- Front camera: 8 MP (1.22 μm, f/1.7), autofocus
- Display: 6.4 inches (162.0 mm); Super AMOLED capacitive touchscreen display, 2960 ×1440 px resolution (516 ppi)
- External display: DisplayPort Alternate Mode with DisplayPort or HDMI with Samsung DeX using a dock
- Sound: Stereo speakers tuned by AKG with Dolby Atmos support
- Connectivity: Wi-Fi 5 802.11 a/b/g/n/ac (2.4/5 GHz), VHT80, MU-MIMO, 1024-QAM Bluetooth 5.0 (LE up to 2 Mbps), ANT+, USB-C, 3.5 mm headphone jack, NFC, location (GPS, Galileo, GLONASS, BeiDou)
- Data inputs: Sensors: Accelerometer; Barometer; Fingerprint scanner (rear-mounted); Iris scanner; Magnetometer; Gyroscope; Hall sensor; Proximity sensor; Heart rate and blood oxygen saturation sensor; Other: S Pen; Physical sound volume keys; Bixby key
- Water resistance: IP68, up to 1.5 m (4.9 ft) for 30 minutes
- Model: International models: SM-N960x (Last letter varies by carrier and international models); Japanese models: SCV40 (au); SC-01L (NTT Docomo)
- Made in: Vietnam
- Website: "Galaxy Note9 128GB (Unlocked) Phones - SM-N960UZBAXAA | Samsung US". Samsung Electronics America. Archived from the original on 13 August 2025.

The Samsung Galaxy Note 9 (stylized as Samsung Galaxy Note9) is an Android-based smartphone developed, produced and marketed by Samsung Electronics as part of the Samsung Galaxy Note series. It was unveiled on 9 August 2018 at a Galaxy Unpacked event, as the successor to the Galaxy Note 8. It is available in six colors (Ocean Blue, Midnight Black, Lavender Purple, Metallic Copper, Cloud Silver, and Alpine White). It was succeeded by the Galaxy Note 10 on 8 August 2019.

Furthermore, it is the last Galaxy Note series phone to include a 3.5 mm headphone jack (except the Note 10 Lite). It is also the last Galaxy Note model that only has LTE support, as its successor also had a 5G version.

== History ==
Many Galaxy Note 9 features were leaked before the official launch, including its S-Pen. On 27 June 2018, Samsung sent out invites for the next Galaxy Unpacked event, showing a gold S Pen image. According to that teaser, it was announced on 9 August 2018.

On 15 July 2018, a picture was posted showing Samsung Electronics co-CEO Koh Dong-Jin holding a Galaxy Note 9.

On 2 August 2018, a picture of the box with the Note 9 was posted from Russia.

== Specifications ==
Rear of a Samsung Galaxy Note 9 (Lavender Purple)

=== Hardware ===
==== Display ====
The Note 9 has an edge-to-edge 6.4-inch (160 mm) 1440p Super AMOLED display with an 18.5:9 aspect ratio. The design on the front is otherwise similar to the Note 8, using an “Infinity Display” as marketed by Samsung.

==== Chipsets ====
The Note 9 uses a Qualcomm Snapdragon 845 SoC in North America, China, Hong Kong, Japan, and Latin America or a Samsung Exynos 9810 SoC in Australia, United Kingdom and the rest of the world.

==== Storage ====
It has 128 or 512 GB storage options. The 128 GB model has 6 GB of RAM while the 512 GB model has 8 GB of RAM, making it the first Samsung flagship mobile phone with 512 GB of internal storage and 8 GB of RAM. All models also have a microSD card slot that can support a microSD card that stores up to 512 gigabytes of data, expanding storage up to 1 terabyte with the 512 GB model.

==== Battery ====
The 4000 mAh battery is significantly upgraded from previous Galaxy phones such as the Note 8, which came with a 3300 mAh, while the Galaxy Note 7 and Galaxy Note 5 came with 3500 mAh and 3000 mAh respectively. A 4000 mAh battery was previously seen only in the Active variants of the S7 and S8.

The Note 9 has fast wireless charging capabilities via the Qi standard.

Wired fast charging is supported at up to 15 W using Qualcomm Quick Charge 2.0.

==== Camera ====
The dual-camera system on the Note 9 is similar to that of the Note 8 and the S9+, consisting of a 12 MP primary wide-angle lens (with the notable addition of a dual-aperture system going from ƒ/1.5-ƒ/2.4 with a 1/2.55-inch sensor and dual-pixel PDAF) and a 12MP ƒ/2.4 telephoto lens capable of 2x optical zoom and 10x digital zoom (with a 1/3.6-inch sensor and AF). Both lenses are optically stabilized. The lenses were arranged horizontally in the camera module on the back of the phone. Like on the S9, the Note 9 supports video recording at 4K resolution (2160p) at up to 60 fps, with slow motion ranging from 240 fps at 1080p (FHD) and 960 fps (marketed as Super Slow-Mo) at 720p (HD).

The camera software includes AI scene recognition that is capable of identifying 20 different types of scenes then making appropriate adjustments to the camera's settings to improve image quality.

A unique feature has been added which warns of blinking eyes, blurred photo, dirty lens etc. after each photograph is taken.

==== Exterior ====
The Note 9 has IP68 water & dust resistance and a USB-C connector that supports Samsung DeX with a dock, through HDMI. It has a 3.5 mm headphone jack along with AKG tuned stereo speakers with Dolby Atmos support.

The fingerprint sensor has been moved to below the camera setup, just like the S9 & S9+, rather than next to the camera like on the Note 8.

There is also a water carbon heat pipe on the phone as part of the touting towards its gaming capability allowing for longer gaming sessions without thermal throttling.

There is a notification LED on the top left of the display, blinking when a new push notification has arrived.

==== S Pen ====
The S Pen now has Bluetooth capabilities, including the ability to tap the button on it (hold, single or double) to do certain tasks, such as moving forwards or backwards in presentations or taking photos, and third-party support is provided for apps via an SDK. S Pen Bluetooth capabilities have been removed in the Galaxy S25 Ultra.

The S-Pen now has a "battery" (essentially a super capacitor) that charges wirelessly when the pen is docked in the silo, with Samsung claiming 30 minutes of usage (or up to 200 clicks of the button) with only 40 seconds of charging.

=== Software ===
The Note 9 ships with Android 8.1 Oreo with Samsung Experience 9.5 as the software overlay. The phone was later updated to Android 9 Pie with One UI 1.0 in January 2019, followed by Android 10 with One UI 2.0 in January 2020. One UI 2.1 was released to the phone in June 2020, followed by One UI 2.5 in October 2020.

Despite the release of the Galaxy S25 series, an unofficially supported version of Android 15 with One UI 7 is available via Noble ROM for the Exynos version of the Note 9.

On 7 September 2022, support for the Galaxy Note 9 ended, with Android 10 and One UI 2.5 being the final OS update and the August 2022 security patch level as the final security update.

== Reception ==
ZDNet named the Note 9 as their smartphone of the year in 2018, over the Google Pixel 3 XL, Apple iPhone XS Max, and OnePlus 6T.

Notebookcheck stated that the Note 9 had better longevity than contemporaries released in 2018, stating "Unlike most flagship phones from that era, however, the Note 9 still manages to look fresh, while offering premium features and performance, even by today's standards. And that, perhaps, is why it'll go down as the last truly great Android flagship." According to Android Police in 2025, "If you polled long-time, hardcore Samsung fans, I think they'd choose the Galaxy Note 9 as one of their all-time favorite devices. I know the Galaxy Note 4 would get plenty of votes, but the Galaxy Note 9 was the last time Samsung appealed to enthusiasts. It still has a loyal fan base today, as I hear from users on their second batteries and third screens — anything to keep their beloved Note 9 in service". The Note 9 includes a microSD card slot, 3.5 mm headphone jack, iris scanner, rear fingerprint sensor, and MST payments, all which are missing in the Galaxy S25 Ultra (Samsung had rebranded the Note as the Ultra starting with the Galaxy S22).

Preceded by Samsung Galaxy Note 8	Samsung Galaxy Note 9; 2018	Succeeded by Samsung Galaxy Note 10
