= Samsung Gear VR =

Virtual reality headset by Samsung

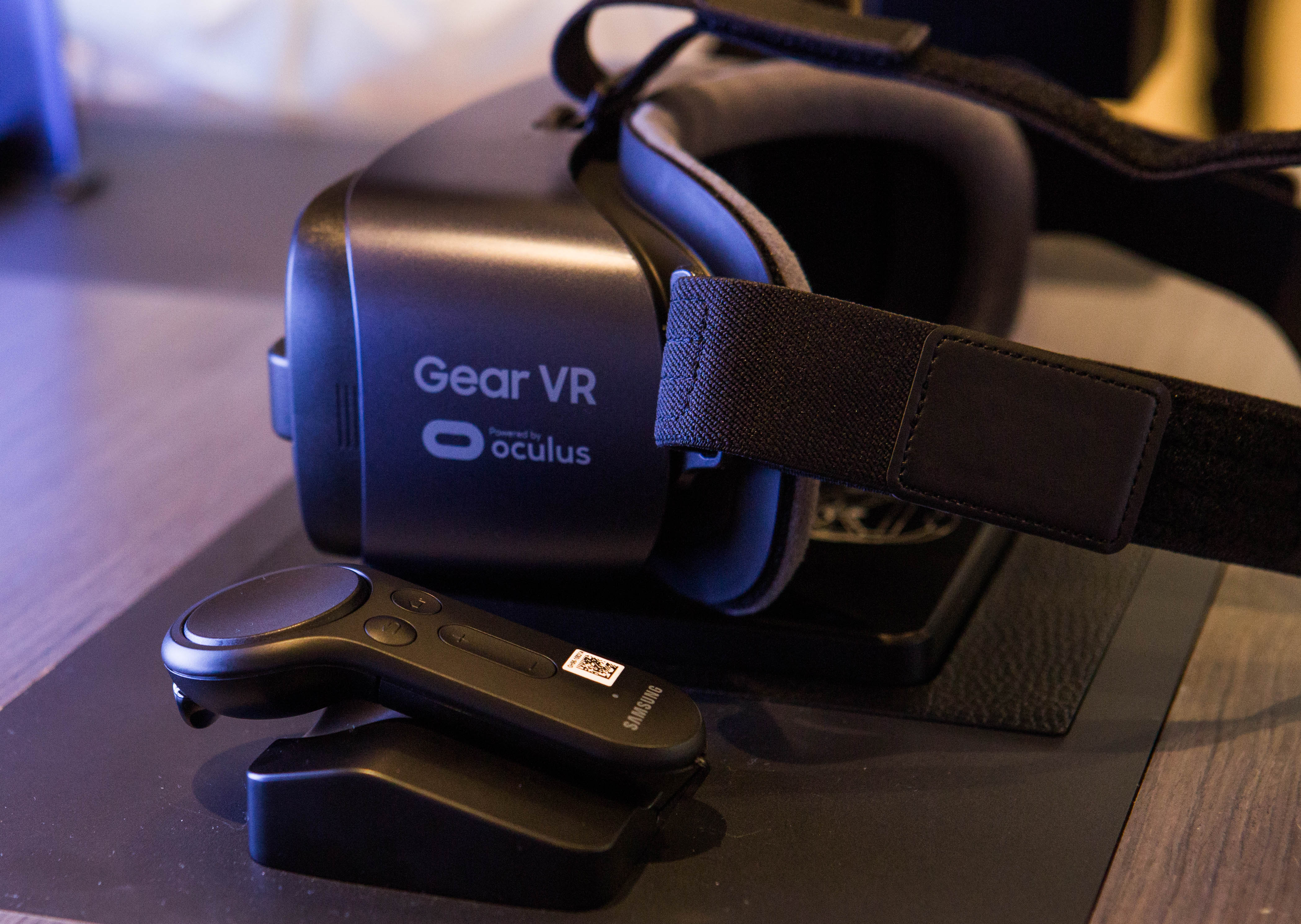
- Also known as: Gear VR
- Developer: Samsung; Oculus VR
- Manufacturer: Samsung
- Product family: Samsung Galaxy; Samsung Gear
- Type: Virtual reality headset
- Released: November 27, 2015
- Lifespan: 4 years 10 months
- Introductory price: US$99.99
- Discontinued: September 30, 2020 (announced)
- Units sold: 5 million
- Display: Display of inserted smartphone
- Controller input: Touchpad and back button
- Touchpad: Yes
- Weight: 345 grams (without smartphone)
- Successor: Oculus Go
- Website: Official website

The Samsung Gear VR was a virtual reality headset developed by Samsung Electronics, in collaboration with Oculus VR, and manufactured by Samsung. The headset was released on November 27, 2015.

When in use, a compatible Samsung Galaxy device acts as the headset's display and processor, while the Gear VR unit itself acts as the controller, which contains the field of view, as well as a custom inertial measurement unit, or IMU, for rotational tracking, which connects to the smartphone via USB-C or micro-USB. The Gear VR headset also includes a touchpad and back button on the side, as well as a proximity sensor to detect when the headset is on.

The Gear VR was first announced on September 3, 2014. To allow developers to create content for the Gear VR and to allow VR and technology enthusiasts to get early access to the technology, Samsung had released two innovator editions of the Gear VR before the consumer version.

== Overview ==
The Samsung Gear VR is designed to work with Samsung’s flagship smartphones. The only supported phones are Galaxy Note 4, Galaxy S6, Galaxy S6 Edge, Galaxy S6 Edge+, Samsung Galaxy Note 5, Galaxy S7, Galaxy S7 Edge, Galaxy S8, Galaxy S8+, Samsung Galaxy Note 8, Samsung Galaxy A8/A8+ (2018), Samsung Galaxy S9/Galaxy S9+, Galaxy S10, and Galaxy S10+.

The Galaxy Note10, Note10+, Note10 5G, and the Note10+ 5G and later are not supported by the Gear VR.

The focus can be adjusted using the wheel at the top of the headset. A trackpad is located on the right of the device, home and back buttons are located just above it. Volume can be adjusted through the volume rockers also found on the right-hand side. A USB-C port is located on the bottom of the headset.

Some of the major goals Samsung set for this project regarding hardware were that their headset could support MTP (Motion to Photon) latency less than 20 milliseconds; the optimization of hardware and kernel; and also, to create Galaxy Note 4’s QHD display that enables high-resolution rendering in the headset. The lenses field of view are 96° for the first three models and 101° for the R323.

Oculus Home is the main facility to download and use content on the Samsung Gear VR. Oculus Home is also the main line for software distribution on the Gear VR. The primary appeal of the Gear VR is for mobile virtual reality-based gaming and simulations; however, recent interest is growing in the effective use of this device in science and medical education.

== History ==
Although the Samsung Gear VR consumer edition was released in November 2015, Samsung had obtained a patent on a head-mounted display (HMD) in January 2005. This was one of the first ideas of using a mobile phone as the display for an HMD. However, mobile phone technology at the time the patent was submitted limited the degree of quality and performance possible. Samsung continued to research VR and HMD internally.

With the release of the Galaxy S4 in 2013, Samsung formed an official team dedicated to developing a virtual reality-based device that would work with a smartphone. While this team developed multiple different prototypes, the performance and display (despite the Galaxy S4 having a Full HD display) were not yet up to standards. In 2014 Samsung partnered with Oculus (the creators of another well-known virtual reality device, the Oculus Rift) to help with the development. The Samsung Gear VR was unveiled during the Samsung press conference at IFA Berlin on September 3, 2014 (along with a smartphone capable of running it, the Galaxy Note 4).

=== Hardware editions ===
The first edition of Samsung's Gear VR, the SM-R320, was released in December 2014. This version was only compatible with the Galaxy Note 4. This edition was mainly released for developers so they could get an understanding of how the device worked and so they could create content which would be ready for the official release of the consumer version of the device. It also gave the chance for VR/technology enthusiasts to gain early access to the technology. The second edition of Samsung’s Gear VR, the SM-R321, was released in March 2015. This device supports only the Galaxy S6 and the Galaxy S6 Edge. A micro-USB port is also added, to provide additional power to the docked device, as well as a small fan inside to prevent the lens fogging.

The next edition, SM-R322, was simply referred to as the Samsung Gear VR. It was released on November 20, 2015. Pre-orders for the device went live on Amazon, Best Buy and Samsung on November 10, 2015, and the device was sold out on the day of release. This edition has again a few minor changes compared to the previous iterations. This edition supports six Samsung Galaxy devices so far: the S6, S6 edge, S6 Edge+, Note 5, S7, and S7 edge. It is also 19% lighter than the previous Innovator Edition, it has improved ergonomics and a redesigned touchpad for easier navigation.

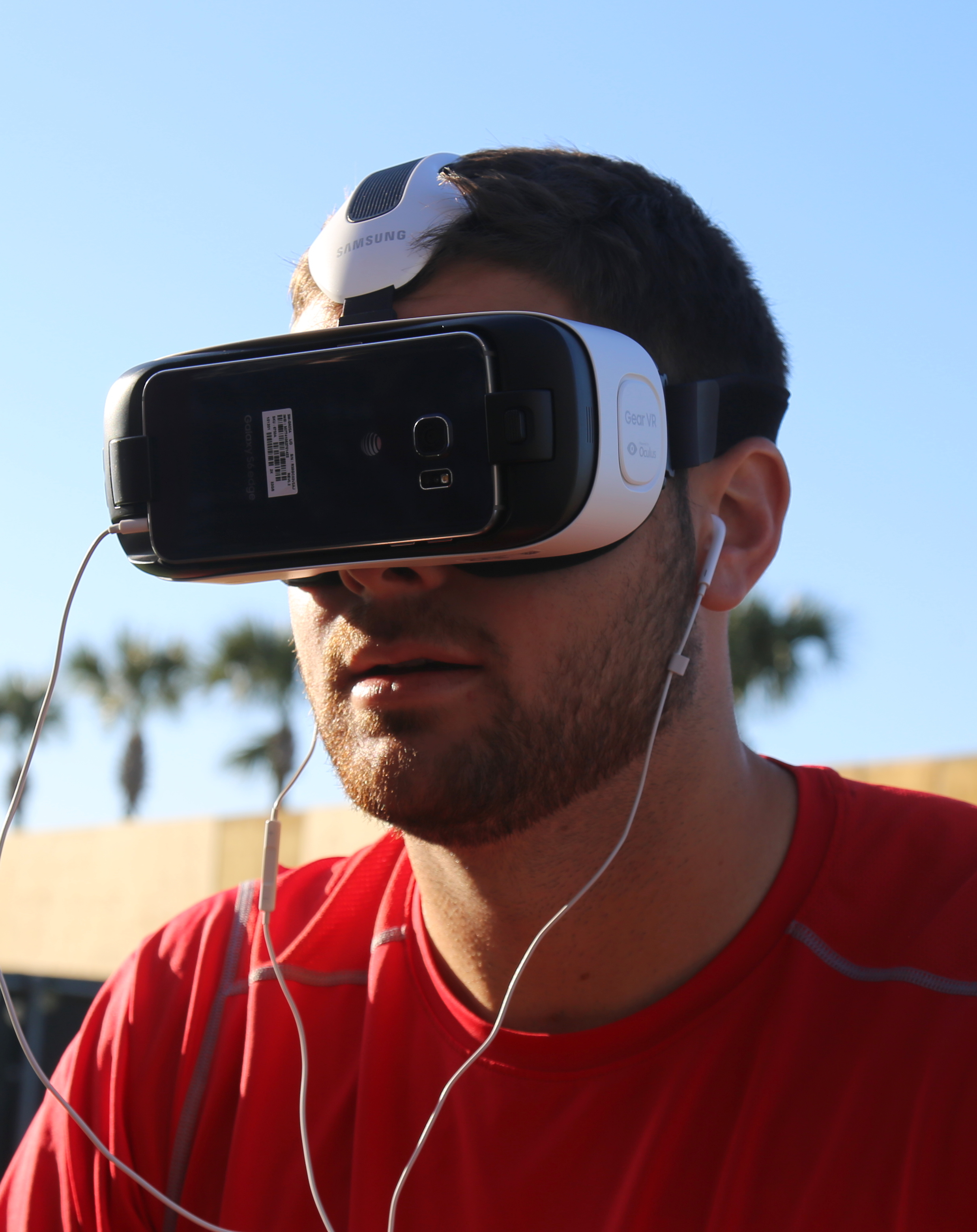
Lucas Giolito wearing a Gear VR headset with a Galaxy S6 Edge in 2016

The SM-R323 model was released alongside the Samsung Galaxy Note 7, and features minor changes, including an improved field of view, increased cushioning, a flat trackpad, and changes to the cover and body of the device to reduce glare. The model also utilizes USB-C connector instead of USB Micro-B so that it could be connected to the Note 7. The port is also capable of data transfer. Adapters are provided for use with older devices using micro-USB connectors. On October 11, 2016, in observance of a recall and discontinuation of the smartphone, the Gear VR was made incompatible with the Galaxy Note 7 for safety reasons.

An updated model, SM-R324, with support for the larger Galaxy S8 was unveiled on March 29, 2017, for release alongside the phone on April 21, 2017. Samsung also unveiled a handheld Gear VR Controller accessory, which was bundled with the updated model, and was also available as a standalone accessory for older devices. It remains compatible with existing supported devices.

An updated model, SM-R325, with support for the larger Note 8 was unveiled on September 15, 2017, for release alongside the phone. Samsung also unveiled a handheld Gear VR Controller accessory, which is bundled with the updated model, and will be available as a standalone accessory for existing devices. It remains compatible with existing supported devices.

=== End of Samsung support ===
On May 11, 2020, Samsung announced that it would be ending service for its XR applications. The service terminated as a whole on September 30, 2020.
With the announcement, 360° video uploads and premium video purchases were disabled immediately. Premium videos from the service were accessible until September 30, 2020. The Samsung XR and Samsung VR Video clients also stopped receiving updates with the announcement.

On June 30, 2020, the support for the Samsung VR Video app ended on Oculus Go, Oculus Rift and Oculus Quest and the app was removed from the Oculus VR store.

On September 30, 2020, all Samsung XR user accounts were disabled, and the according account information and data was permanently deleted from the Samsung XR service. All published videos were removed from the Samsung XR service. The Samsung VR Video app is no longer supported on Samsung Gear VR and Windows Odyssey. The app was also removed from the Oculus and Microsoft Mixed Reality stores. The Samsung XR mobile app is no longer supported on Android devices. The mobile app was also removed from the Galaxy Store and Google Play.

Oculus (now Reality Labs) continues to support the Oculus Gear VR app.

== List of editions and smartphone compatibilities ==
=== Samsung Galaxy VR (SM-R325) ===
- Samsung Galaxy Note 9 (with adapter from Samsung) Galaxy Note9 is compatible with Gear VR model number SM-R325NZVC*** only
- Samsung Galaxy S10+
- Samsung Galaxy S10
- Samsung Galaxy S10e
- Samsung Galaxy S9
- Samsung Galaxy S9+
- Samsung Galaxy Note8
- Samsung Galaxy S8
- Samsung Galaxy S8+

Utilizes a USB-C connector and can be used with the below models using an adapter

- Samsung Galaxy S6
- Samsung Galaxy S6 Edge
- Samsung Galaxy S6 Edge+
- Samsung Galaxy Note 5
- Samsung Galaxy S7
- Samsung Galaxy S7 Edge
- Samsung Galaxy A8
- Samsung Galaxy A8 Plus
- Samsung Galaxy A8 Star

=== Samsung Galaxy VR (SM-R324) ===
- Samsung Galaxy S8
- Samsung Galaxy S8+

Utilizes a USB-C connector and can be used with the below models using an adapter

- Samsung Galaxy S6
- Samsung Galaxy S6 Edge
- Samsung Galaxy S6 Edge+
- Samsung Galaxy Note 5
- Samsung Galaxy S7
- Samsung Galaxy S7 Edge

=== Samsung Galaxy VR (SM-R323) ===
- Samsung Galaxy Note7 (initially)

Utilizes a USB-C connector and can be used with the below models using an adapter

- Samsung Galaxy S6
- Samsung Galaxy S6 Edge
- Samsung Galaxy S6 Edge+
- Samsung Galaxy Note 5
- Samsung Galaxy S7
- Samsung Galaxy S7 Edge
- Samsung Galaxy S8

=== Samsung Gear VR (SM-R322) ===
- Samsung Galaxy S6
- Samsung Galaxy S6 Edge
- Samsung Galaxy S6 Edge+
- Samsung Galaxy Note 5
- Samsung Galaxy S7
- Samsung Galaxy S7 Edge

=== Samsung Gear VR (SM-R321) ===
- Samsung Galaxy S6
- Samsung Galaxy S6 Edge

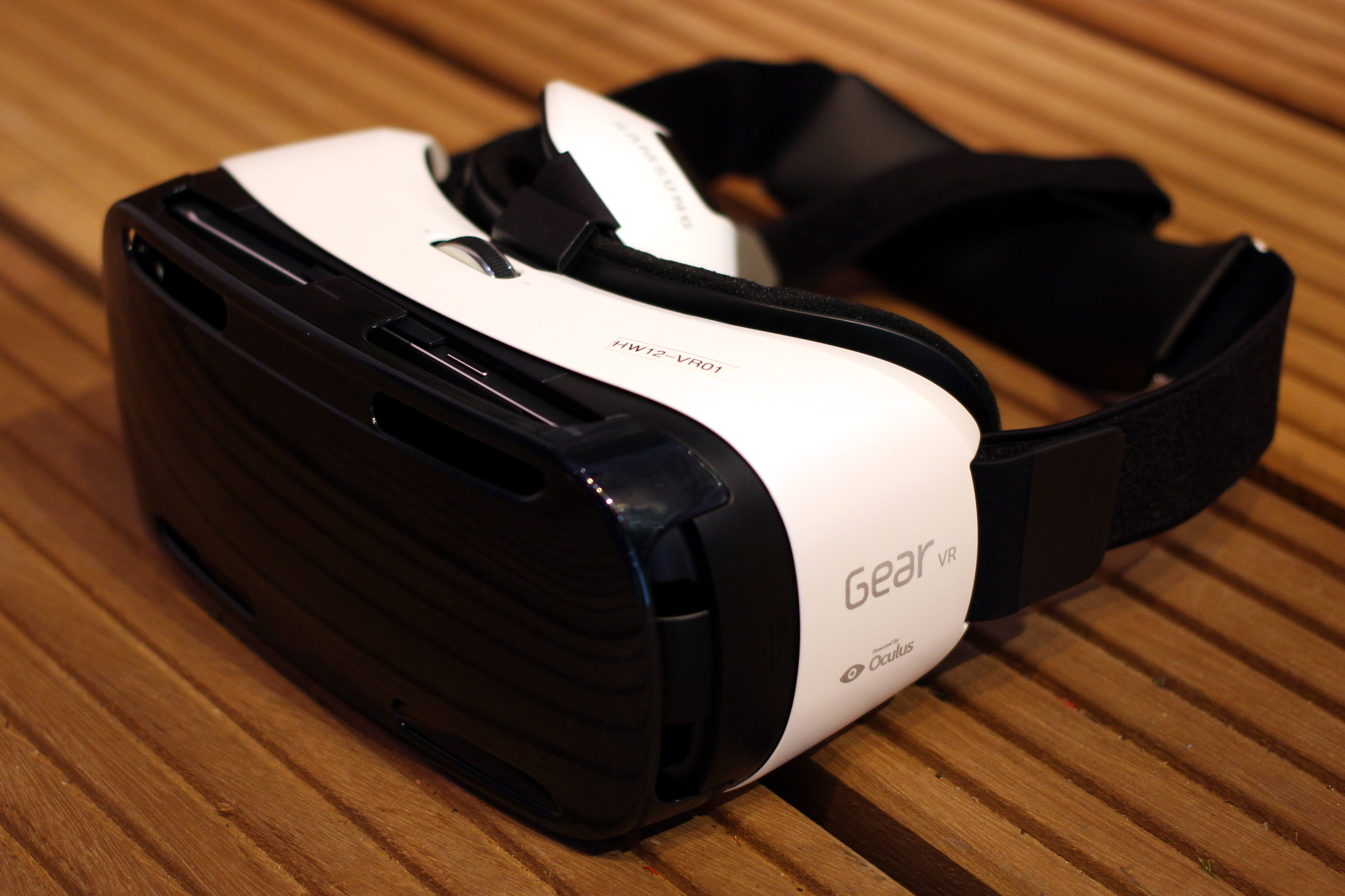
Samsung Gear VR SM-R320

=== Samsung Gear VR (SM-R320) ===
- Samsung Galaxy Note 4
