= Samsung Galaxy Note 5 =

2015 flagship phablet by Samsung Electronics

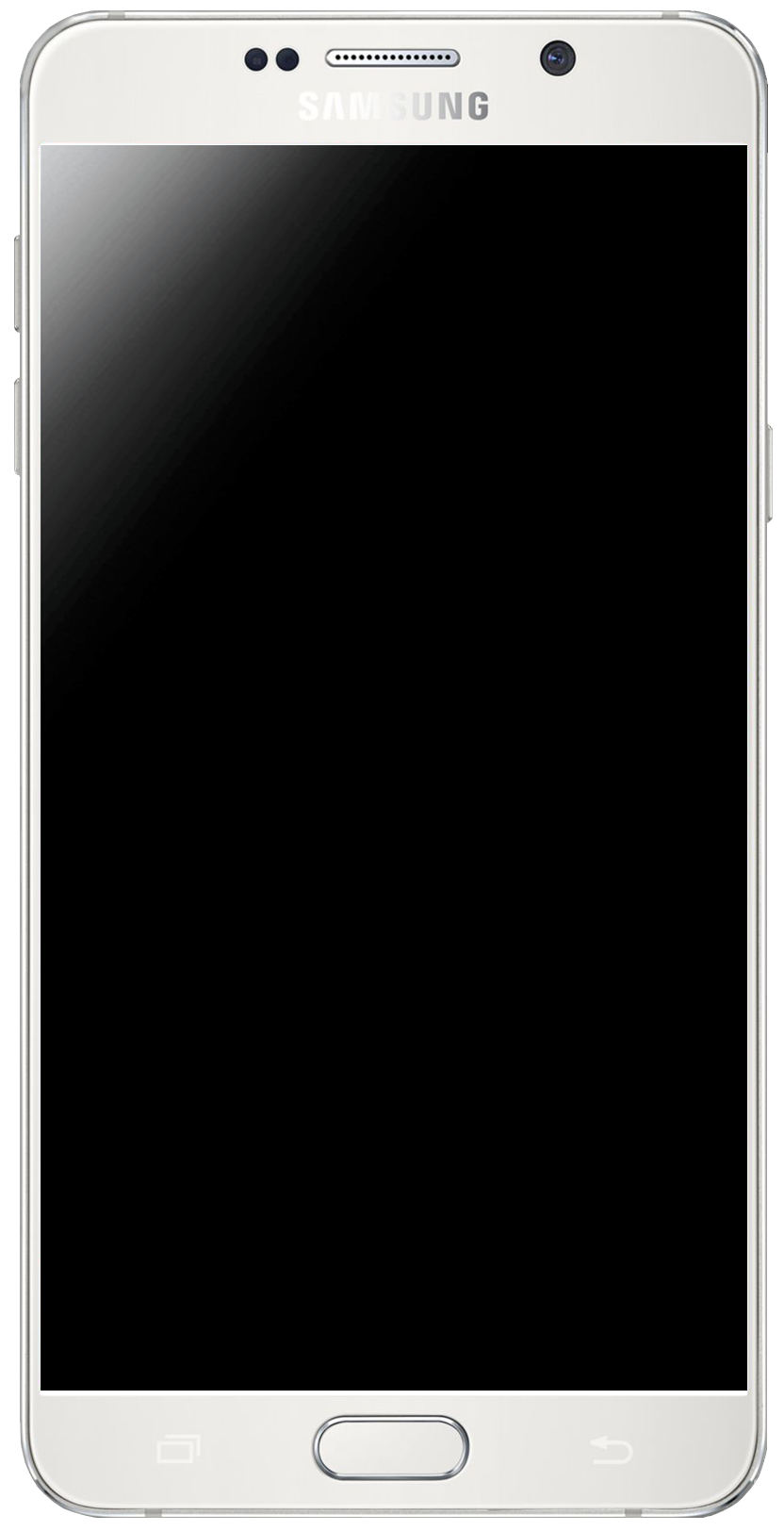
- Samsung Galaxy Note 5
- Brand: Samsung
- Manufacturer: Samsung Electronics
- Type: Phablet
- Series: Galaxy Note
- Family: Samsung Galaxy
- First released: August 21, 2015; 11 years ago
- Availability by region: August 21, 2015; 11 years ago
- Discontinued: September 15, 2017; 8 years ago
- Predecessor: Samsung Galaxy Note 4
- Successor: Samsung Galaxy Note 7 Samsung Galaxy Note FE; Samsung Galaxy Note 8
- Related: Samsung Galaxy S6
- Compatible networks: 2G / 3G / 4G
- Form factor: Slate
- Dimensions: 153.2 mm (6.03 in) H 76.1 mm (3.00 in) W 7.6 mm (0.30 in) D
- Weight: 171 g (6.0 oz)
- Operating system: Original: Android 5.1.1 "Lollipop"; First major update: Android 6.0.1 "Marshmallow"; Current: Android 7.0 "Nougat" with Samsung Experience 8.0; Unofficial: Android 14.0 "Upside Down Cake", via LineageOS
- System-on-chip: Exynos 7 Octa 7420
- CPU: Octa-core 64-bit 14 nm • Quad-core 2.1 GHz Cortex-A57 • Quad-core 1.5 GHz Cortex-A53
- GPU: Mali-T760 MP8
- Memory: 4 GB LPDDR4
- Storage: 32, 64, or 128 GB UFS 2.0
- Battery: Li-Ion 3000 mAh
- Rear camera: 16 megapixel Samsung ISOCELL S5K2P2 or Sony Exmor RS IMX240, f/1.9, 2160p@30 fps, 1440p@30fps, 1080p@60/30 fps, 720p@30/60 fps, auto HDR, slow motion video recording 720p at 120fps, optical image stabilization, video stabilization, phase detection autofocus, tracking autofocus, manual focus, LED flash
- Front camera: 5 MP, 1440p/1080p/720p video recording, dual video call, auto HDR
- Display: 5.7 inch (145 mm) Quad HD Super AMOLED (16:9 aspect ratio) 2560×1440 pixel resolution, 518 ppi
- Sound: Dolby Digital Sound 2.0
- Data inputs: List: Multi-touch touch screen; 3 push buttons; Headset controls; Proximity sensor; Ambient light sensors; 3-axis gyroscope; Magnetometer; Accelerometer; Barometer; Hall-effect sensor; Gesture sensor; aGPS; GLONASS; RGB light sensor; S Pen (stylus/pen); Fingerprint sensor
- Model: SM-N920x (Last letter varies by carrier & international models)
- Codename: Project Noble

The Samsung Galaxy Note 5 (stylized as SΛMSUNG Galaxy Note5) is an Android-based phablet-sized smartphone manufactured, developed, produced and marketed by Samsung Electronics. Unveiled on August 13, 2015 and released on August 21, 2015, alongside the Galaxy S6 Edge+, it is the successor to the Galaxy Note 4 and a part of the Galaxy Note series.

The Galaxy Note 5 carries over hardware and software features from the Galaxy S6, including a changed design with a glass backing, improved camera, and fingerprint scanner. The precluded camera software also includes built in livestreaming functionality, as well as features meant for use with the device's bundled, spring-loaded stylus.

The device received positive reviews from critics, who praised the upgraded build quality over prior models, along with improvements to its performance, camera, and other changes. Similarly to the S6, Samsung was criticized for making the Galaxy Note 5's battery non-removable, and removing the ability to expand its storage via microSD. It was argued that these changes potentially alienated power users—especially because the Galaxy Note series had historically been oriented towards this segment of the overall market.

The Galaxy Note 5 was briefly succeeded by the Galaxy Note 7, released on August 19, 2016. However, that device was ultimately recalled and pulled from the market after repeated incidents where batteries overheated and caught on fire. The discontinued Note 7 was later re-launched as Galaxy Note Fan Edition in July 2017, while a fully-fledged successor, the Galaxy Note 8, was released in September 2017.

== Specifications ==
=== Hardware ===
==== Design ====
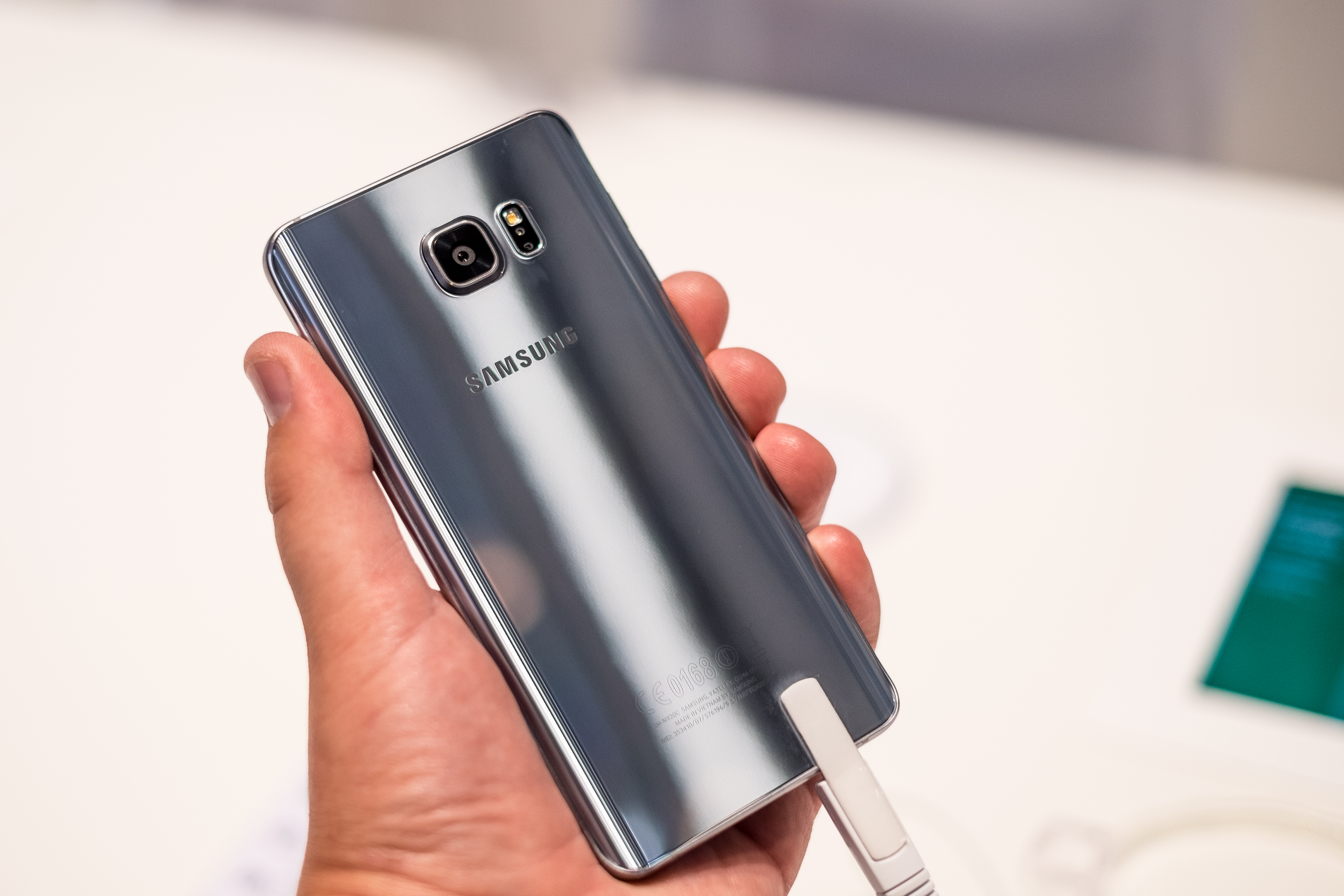

The Galaxy Note 5 adopts a similar design and construction to the Galaxy S6, featuring a unibody metal frame and glass backing, although unlike the standard S6, the back of the device is curved. It is offered in dark blue, white, gold, and silver color finishes. The storage slot for the S Pen stylus uses a spring-loaded mechanism to eject the pen for more convenience. Due to the design, inserting the pen in reverse could cause it to get stuck. This issue is known as "pengate".

==== Functionality ====
Like on the Galaxy S6, Mobile high-definition link (MHL), a feature introduced with the Galaxy S II and Galaxy Note in 2011, has been removed from the series with the Galaxy Note 5.

The Galaxy Note 5 has a non-removable 3,000 mAh lithium-ion battery and supports the Qi open interface standard.

The Note 5 features a 5.7-inch 1440p Super AMOLED display. It is powered by a 64-bit Exynos 7 Octa 7420 system-on-chip, consisting of four 2.1 GHz Cortex-A57 cores, and four 1.5 GHz Cortex-A53 cores, and 4 GB of LPDDR4 RAM.

The Galaxy Note 5 is available with either 32 GB or 64 GB of storage (a special “Winter Edition” exclusive to South Korea offers 128 GB storage), and utilizes a 3020 mAh battery with wireless and fast charging (Qualcomm Quick Charge 2.0) support. Samsung claims wired fast charging and wireless fast charging to be able to charge the phone entirely in 90 and 120 minutes respectively.

Similarly to the S6, the Note 5 does not offer expandable storage or the ability to remove the battery, unlike its predecessor.

As with the S6, the fingerprint scanner in the home button now uses a touch-based scanning mechanism rather than swipe-based, and the device also supports Samsung Pay.

==== Camera ====
The 16-megapixel rear-facing camera is identical to the Galaxy S6, with an f/1.9 aperture, optical image stabilization, object tracking autofocus, and real-time HDR. Video recording is supported at 2160p with 30 frames per second, 1080p with 60fps and 720p with 120fps.

=== Software ===
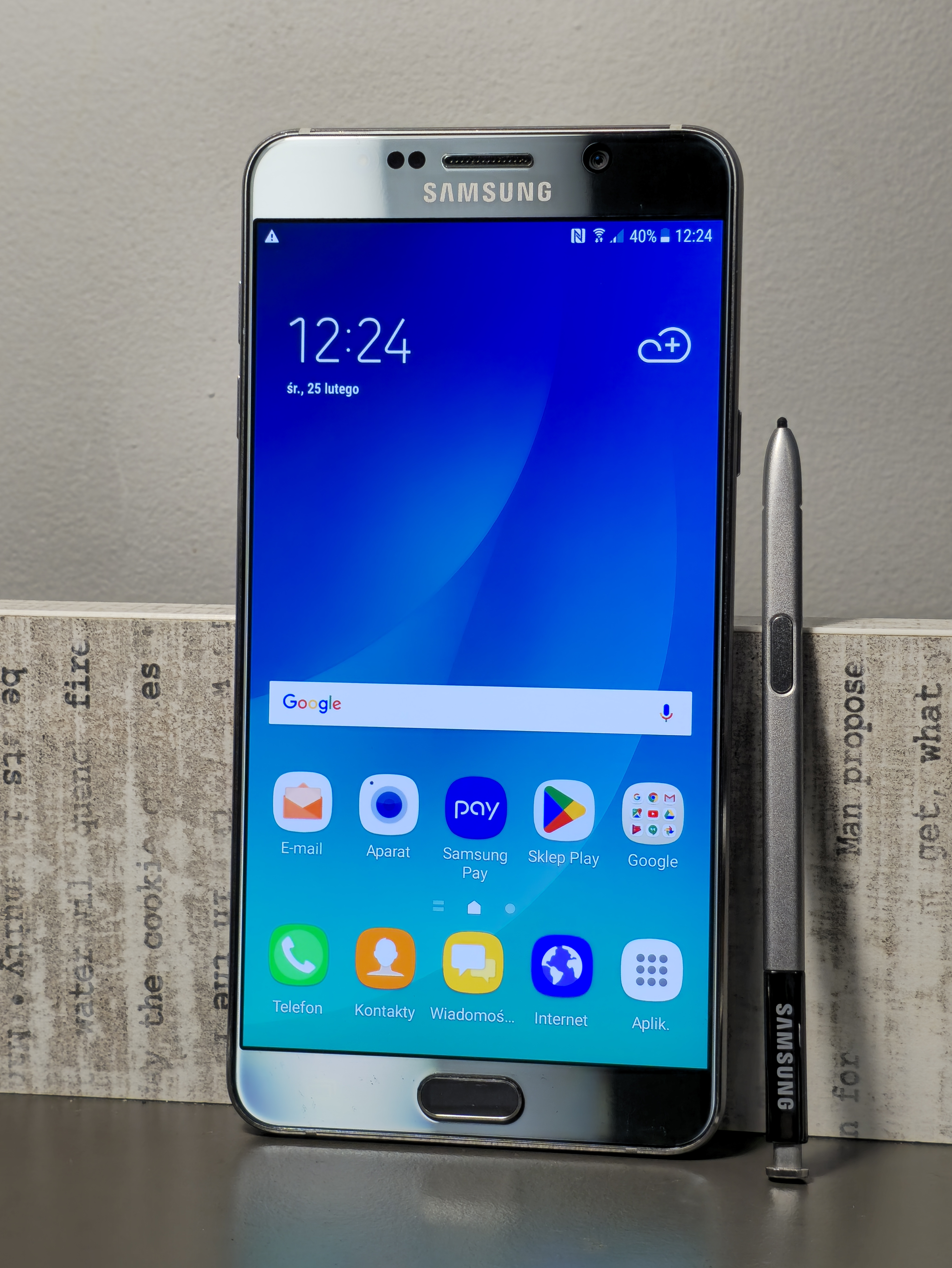

The Galaxy Note 5 shipped with Android 5.1.1 Lollipop with TouchWiz Noble UX. The new "Screen off memo" feature allows the phone to be awoken directly to a note screen when the stylus is removed. The Camera app on the Note 5 also allows public and private livestreaming directly to YouTube, and supports export of RAW images.

In February 2016, Samsung began to release Android 6.0.1 Marshmallow with TouchWiz Hero UX for the Galaxy Note 5.

The Galaxy Note 5 also gradually received the Nougat (Android 7.0) update with Samsung Experience 8.0 during the first and second quarters of 2017.

Android 9.0 “Pie” with One UI 1.0, issued in November 2018, can be unofficially installed on the Galaxy Note 5 via custom ROMs.

== European release ==
The Galaxy Note 5 was not released in Europe, in favor of solely marketing the S6 Edge+ in the region. Samsung European Vice President of Brand and Marketing Rory O'Neill explained that the decision was based upon market research showing that consumers in the region primarily viewed large-screen phones as being oriented towards entertainment, and not productivity.

== Reception ==
=== Reviews ===
The Verge complimented the higher-quality build of the Galaxy Note 5, describing it as being a "more humane device" due to its lighter build with thinner bezels in comparison to the Galaxy Note 4, along with its display, performance and additional S Pen features. However, the Galaxy Note 5 was panned for not offering a removable battery, expandable storage, or a 128 GB model, considering these oversights to be inappropriate for a device in a series that was "unapologetically meant for power users." The device was also described as being the result of Samsung "[holding themselves] back", having dropped the "old, unfettered excessiveness of the old Note" in favour of developing a “consumer-friendly” device with only minor upgrades over the S6.

TechRadar shared a similar degree of positivity towards the Galaxy Note 5, noting that "the sacrifices Samsung felt it needed to make to get to that premium Note 5 design have turned off some longtime users. Thankfully, there's a lot more to like about this phone upgrade than dislike."

=== Issues ===
Following its release, it was discovered that inserting the pen into the Note 5's storage slot backwards could result in permanent damage to the spring mechanism, making the stylus become stuck, or damaging the sensor that detects when the S Pen is removed; all of these scenarios render the stylus unusable. This issue was dubbed "pengate".

Samsung was aware of this issue and stated that it had provided a warning against backward pen insertion in the Galaxy Note 5's manual, but placed more prominent warning labels on the device itself on later shipments.

In January 2016, it was reported that the design of the mechanism had been revised to allow the safe ejection of a pen accidentally inserted backwards, without causing damage to the sensor. This was achieved by using a stronger, differently designed clip that accommodated the pen being stored both ways. It is not possible to confirm which model a device is without opening it.

=== Sales ===
In its first three days on sale, over 75,000 units of the Note 5 (together with the S6 Edge+) were sold in South Korea, exceeding the rate of sales of the previous year's models. A study by AnTuTu detailed that this smartphone was one of the most popular Android devices in the first half of 2016.

=== Other ===
The device has been featured in the music video of Focus, a song by Ariana Grande, with her writing the phrase "Focus on me" using the stylus.

Preceded by Samsung Galaxy Note 4	Samsung Galaxy Note 5; 2015 / 2016	Succeeded by Samsung Galaxy Note 7 (Discontinued and recalled); Samsung Galaxy Note Fan Edition
