= Samsung Galaxy Note FE =

2017 mid-range phablet by Samsung Electronics

Samsung Galaxy Note Fan Edition

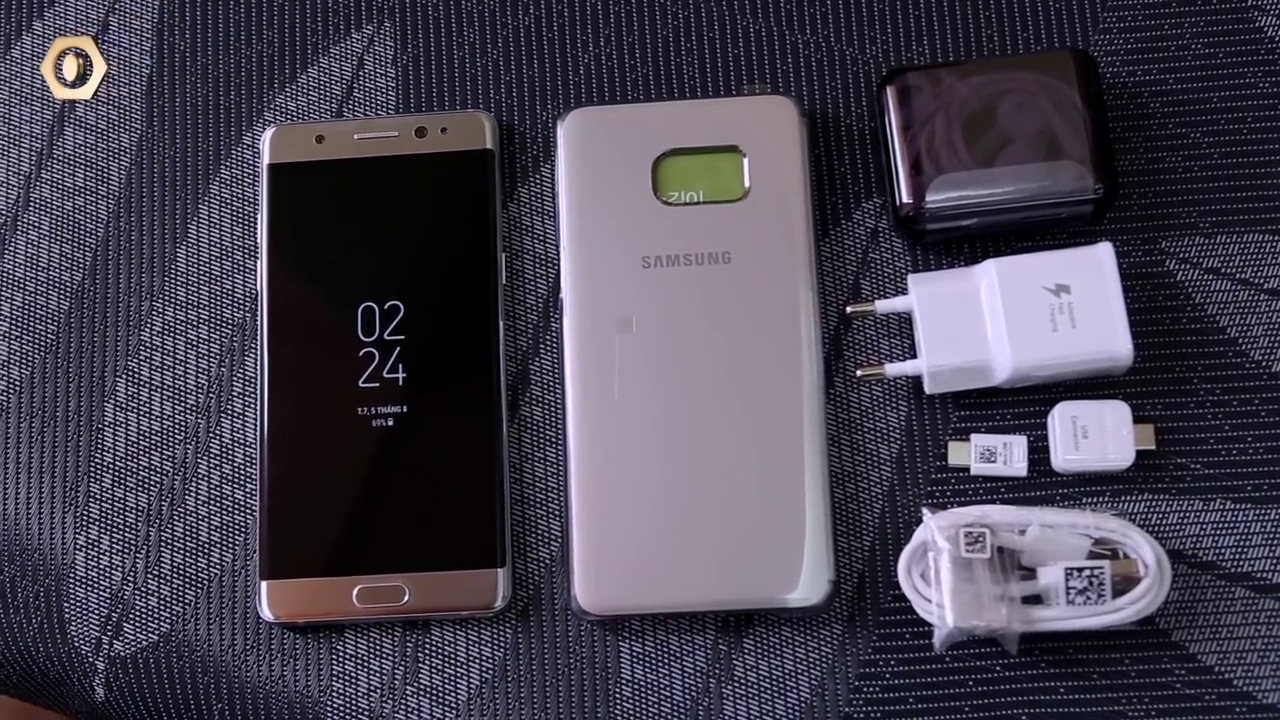
- Brand: Samsung
- Manufacturer: Samsung Electronics
- Type: Smartphone
- Series: Galaxy Note
- Family: Samsung Galaxy
- First released: 7 July 2017; 9 years ago
- Discontinued: Unknown
- Predecessor: Samsung Galaxy Note 3 Neo
- Successor: Samsung Galaxy Note 10 Lite (indirect); Samsung Galaxy S20 FE
- Related: Samsung Galaxy S7; Samsung Galaxy Note 7 Samsung Galaxy S8; Samsung Galaxy Note 8
- Compatible networks: 2G, 3G, 4G LTE
- Form factor: Slate
- Colors: Black onyx, Silver titanium, Blue coral, Gold platinum
- Dimensions: 153.5 mm (6.04 in) H 73.7 mm (2.90 in) W 7.9 mm (0.31 in) D
- Weight: 167 g (5.9 oz)
- Operating system: Original:: Android 7.0 "Nougat" with Samsung Experience 8.1; Current:: Android 9.0 "Pie" with One UI 1.0
- System-on-chip: Samsung Exynos 8890
- CPU: 2.3 GHz Mongoose & 1.6 GHz Cortex-A53 Octa-core 2.2 GHz Kyro & 1.6 GHz Kryo Quad-Core
- GPU: Mali-T880 MP12
- Memory: 4 GB LPDDR4 RAM
- Storage: 64 GB
- Removable storage: microSDXC (up to 256 GB)
- Battery: 3.85 V, 3200 mAh (12.32 Wh) Li-ion battery, not user-replaceable
- Charging: 25W USB-C Fast Charging; Qi wireless charging standard
- Display: 5.7 in (140 mm) 227 ppcm (518 ppi); Quad HD Super AMOLED 2560×1440 pixel resolution (16:9 aspect ratio)
- Connectivity: USB-C
- Data inputs: S Pen
- Water resistance: IP68, up to 1.5 m (4.9 ft) for 30 minutes
- Development status: Discontinued

The Samsung Galaxy Note Fan Edition (marketed as Samsung Galaxy Note FE) is an Android-based smartphone "phablet" manufactured, developed, produced and marketed by Samsung Electronics, released 9 months after the recall of the phone it was based on, the Samsung Galaxy Note 7. The Galaxy Note FE was unveiled on 7 July 2017. It is the last phone in the Galaxy Note series to have a physical home button and to have navigation buttons on the bottom bezel, a single-camera setup as well as the Samsung logo on the top bezel for certain models.

It is a refurbished version of the original Samsung Galaxy Note 7, with a smaller battery of 3200 mAh instead of the 3500mAh recalled battery of the original, and is supplied with Android Nougat with Samsung Experience 8.1.

== History ==
In June 2017, The Wall Street Journal reported on Samsung's plan to refurbish its inventory of recalled phones and release them with a new model designation of Galaxy Note FE, the "FE" being an abbreviation of "Fan Edition". The phone was also rumored to be named the Note 7R, with the "R" standing for "refurbished". This phone was released in South Korea on 7 July 2017, with limited availability in other countries to follow, and a price of $610; being a $255 discount from the price of the Note 7.

The Fan Edition has a smaller battery of 3200 mAh and multiple safety features. The software is identical to that of the S8, featuring a similar UI, and includes Bixby home and reminders but not the entire Bixby assistant. Samsung introduced an eight-point battery check after the Note 7 to make sure all of their batteries were safe for new and current devices in production. There have been no reported incidents of an S8 or S8+ catching fire after their release as the first new flagship device to go through the eight-point battery check, nor have there been reports of the Note 8 catching fire.

After the Fan Edition was released in South Korea, the Galaxy Note FE was also released in select countries in Asia and Saudi Arabia starting in October 2017.

== Gallery ==
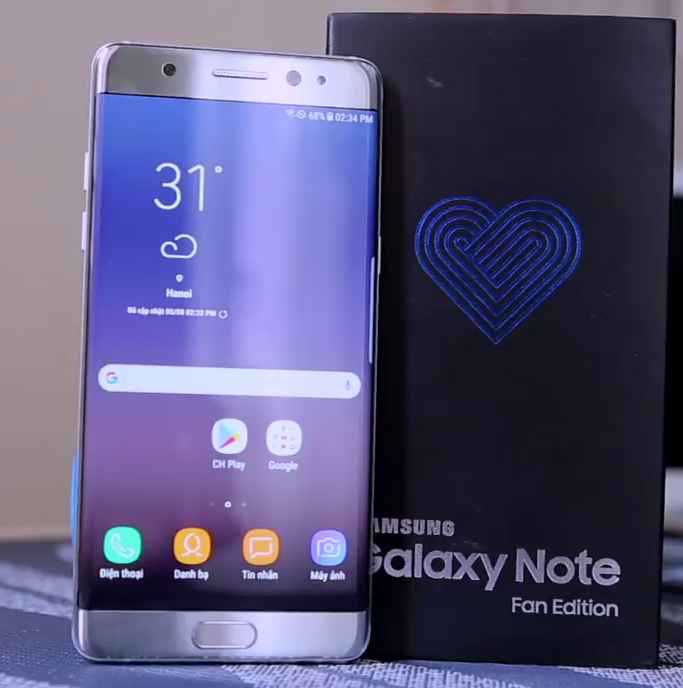
Front side, showing the included Samsung Experience onscreen user interface alongside the packaging

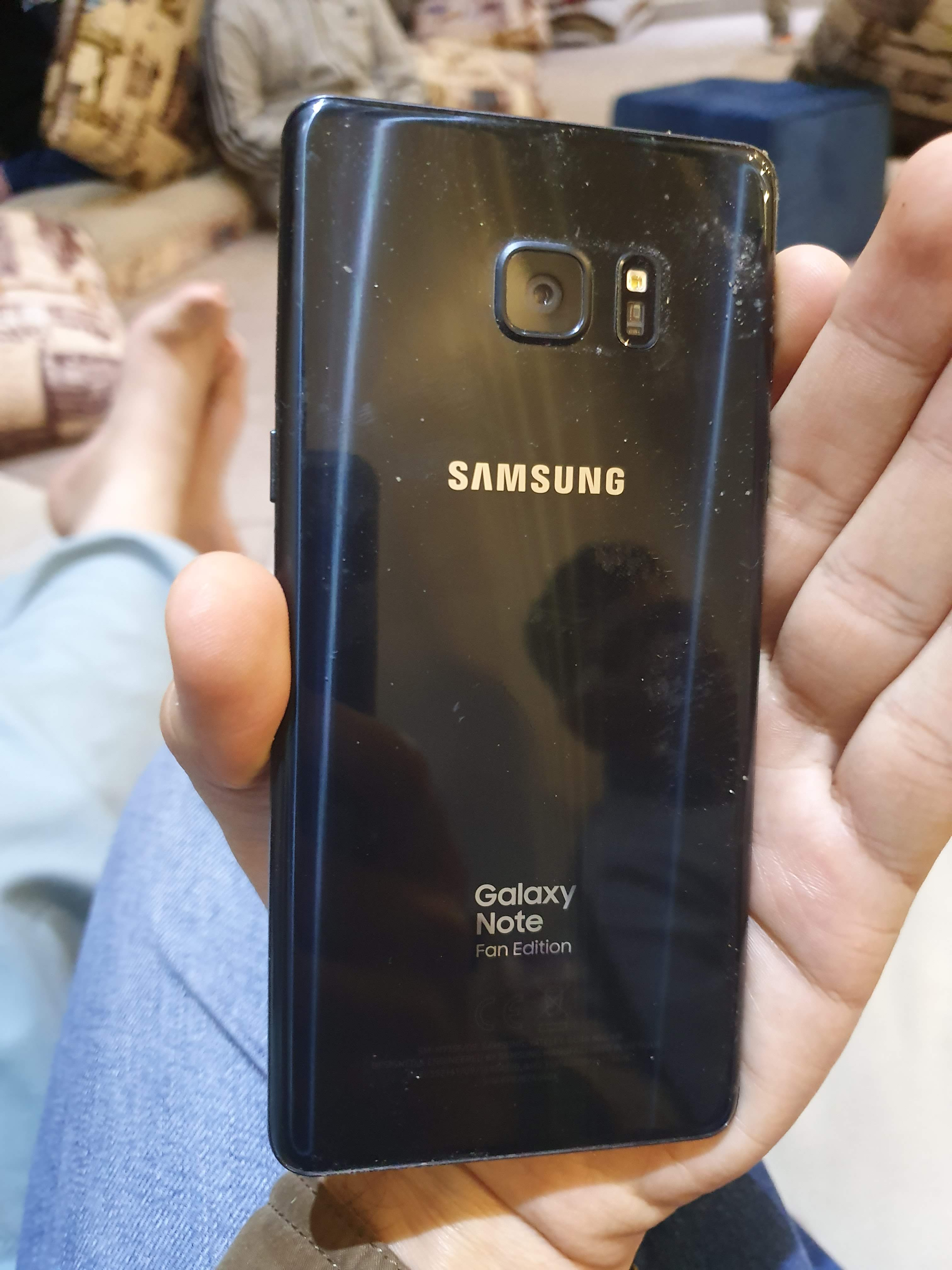
Back side of the Samsung Galaxy Note Fan Edition
