= Samsung Galaxy Note 8 =

Android phablet developed by Samsung Electronics

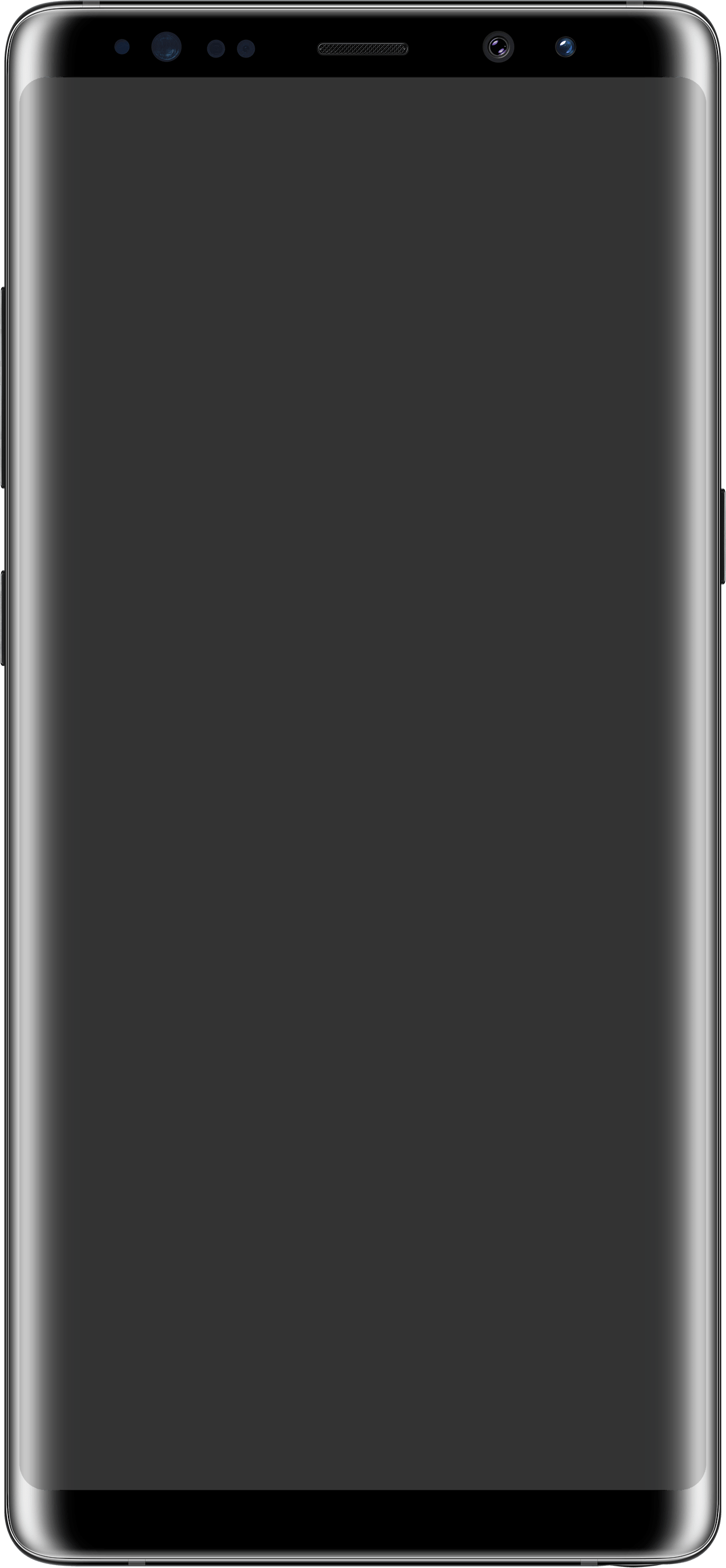
- Samsung Galaxy Note 8
- Brand: Samsung
- Manufacturer: Samsung Electronics
- Type: Smartphone
- Series: Galaxy Note
- Family: Samsung Galaxy
- First released: 15 September 2017; 9 years ago
- Discontinued: 8 September 2020; 6 years ago
- Predecessor: Samsung Galaxy Note 7
- Successor: Samsung Galaxy Note 9
- Related: Samsung Galaxy S8; Samsung Galaxy A8/A8+ (2018)
- Form factor: Slate
- Colors: Midnight Black, Maple Gold, Orchid Gray, Deep Sea Blue, Star Pink
- Dimensions: 162.5 mm × 74.8 mm × 8.6 mm (6.40 in × 2.94 in × 0.34 in)
- Weight: 195 g (6.9 oz)
- Operating system: Original: Android 7.1.1 "Nougat" with Samsung Experience 8.5; Current: Android Pie 9 with One UI 1.0; Unofficial: Android 15 with One UI 7 port ROM from Galaxy S24 Ultra
- System-on-chip: Global: Exynos 8895; USA, China, and Japan: Qualcomm Snapdragon 835
- CPU: Exynos: Octa-core (4×2.3 GHz M2 Mongoose & 4×1.7 GHz) Cortex-A53 (GTS); Snapdragon: Octa-core (4×2.35 GHz & 4×1.9 GHz) Kryo 280
- GPU: Exynos: Mali-G71 MP20; Snapdragon: Adreno 540
- Memory: 6 GB LPDDR4X RAM
- Storage: Global: 64, 128 or 256 GB; USA: 64 GB
- Removable storage: microSDXC, expandable up to 256 GB
- Battery: Internal 3300 mAh
- Charging: Qualcomm Quick Charge 2.0 up to 15 W Qi wireless charging
- Rear camera: Dual 12 MP (Wide-angle f/1.7 + Telephoto f/2.4) with 2× optical zoom, Dual OIS with Dual Pixel autofocus, 4K video recording at 30fps, 1080p at 60fps, 720p at 240fps
- Front camera: 8 MP, f/1.7, autofocus, 1/3.6" sensor size, 1.22 μm pixel size, 1440p at 30fps, dual video call, Auto HDR
- Display: 6.3 in (160 mm) (160.5 mm) QHD+ Super AMOLED 2960 x 1440 1440p (521 ppi)
- Connectivity: Wi-Fi 802.11 a/b/g/n/ac (2.4/5GHz), VHT80, MU-MIMO, 1024-QAM Bluetooth 5.0 (LE up to 2 Mbps), ANT+, USB-C, 3.5mm headphone jack, NFC, location (GPS, Galileo, GLONASS, BeiDou)
- Data inputs: Sensors: Accelerometer; Barometer; Fingerprint scanner; Iris scanner; Magnetometer; Gyroscope; Hall sensor; Proximity sensor; Other: Physical volume keys; Bixby key
- Water resistance: IP68, up to 1.5 m (4.9 ft) for 30 minutes
- Model: International models: SM-N950x (Last letter varies by carrier & international models); Japanese models: SCV37 (au); SC-01K (NTT Docomo)
- Codename: Great
- Other: S Pen stylus
- Website: "Galaxy Note8 64GB (Unlocked) Midnight Black Phones - SM-N950UZKAXAA | Samsung US". Samsung Electronics America. Archived from the original on 3 December 2024.

The Samsung Galaxy Note 8 is an Android-based smartphone developed, produced and marketed by Samsung Electronics. The successor to the discontinued Galaxy Note 7, the refurbished Galaxy Note FE, the Galaxy Note 5, and the Galaxy Note 4, it was unveiled on 23 August 2017 and became available on 15 September 2017.

The Note 8 improves on the core device specifications and hallmark S-Pen features of earlier devices. While retaining the same overall look and approximate size of the Galaxy S8+, it features an upgraded processor and, for the first time in Samsung's smartphone history, a dual-camera system on the rear of the device; one functions as a wide-angle lens and the other as a telephoto lens, with both featuring 12 MP resolution and optical image stabilization. The S-Pen has increased pressure sensitivity levels and its software has been upgraded to offer improved note-taking capabilities on the always-on display, as well as animated GIF and improved translation features.

== History ==
On 20 July 2017, Samsung tweeted a teaser video showing a darkened device with a stylus, stating the date of its next “Unpacked” event as 23 August 2017. The Galaxy Note 8 was unveiled at that event, with a release date on 15 September 2017. Galaxy Note 7 owners could buy this phablet at a special discount of $524, as a result of the recall of the earlier.

== Specifications ==
=== Hardware ===
==== Chipsets ====
The Note 8 is powered by an Exynos 8895 or Snapdragon 835 processor, depending on geographic region, along with 6 GB of RAM.

==== Battery ====
The Galaxy Note 8 is equipped with a non-user-replaceable 3300 mAh battery with up to 15 W using Qualcomm Quick Charge 2.0.

==== Display ====
The Note 8 has a 6.3-inch 1440p Super AMOLED display with curved edges similar to the Galaxy S8, but with a slightly more flat and boxy surface area. Samsung marketed it as an “Infinity Display”.

==== Camera ====
It is Samsung's first phone to feature a dual-lens camera system, which comes with a 12 MP wide-angle lens with f/1.7 aperture and a 12 MP telephoto lens with f/2.4 aperture and twice the focal length, both equipped with optical image stabilization.

Like the predecessor, it supports video recording with 2160p (4K) at 30 frames per second (limited to 10 minutes each video), 1080p (Full HD) at up to 60 frames per second and 720p (HD) slow motion at up to 240 frames per second.

==== Storage ====
In the United States, it is sold with 64 GB of internal storage, along with microSD card support, but increases storage to 128 GB and 256 GB internationally.

==== Biometrics ====
The handset features a fingerprint scanner next to the rear camera, and retains facial recognition and iris recognition similar to the S8.

==== Audio ====
The Note 8 comes bundled with high-end AKG-tuned earbuds as well as the Note series' proprietary S Pen. Compared to the Note 5, the S Pen in the Note 8 has enhanced levels of pressure sensitivity (4,096 distinct levels of pressure), though The Verge noted that those enhancements were featured in the defunct Note 7. Ports include a 3.5 mm headphone jack and a USB-C port for charging and data transfer. It has support for Samsung DeX as well, letting Note 8 users connect their device to a dock and monitor to enable a PC-like computing environment with mouse and keyboard input.

=== Exterior ===
Both the Note 8 and its S Pen are certified with IP68 rating for water and dust resistance, and is available in five color variants: “Midnight Black,” “Orchid Gray,” “Maple Gold,” “Deepsea Blue,” and “Blossom Pink” – which is often dubbed “Star Pink.” However, the Maple Gold, Deep-Sea Blue, and Blossom Pink variants are not available worldwide, and are limited to certain regions and/or countries. Similar to the Galaxy S8, the Note 8 has a dedicated physical key for launching the Bixby virtual assistant.

A limited-edition version for the 2018 Winter Olympics was made, with a white back, gold accents, and themed wallpapers.

=== Software ===
The Note 8 came with Android 7.1.1 “Nougat” with Samsung's own custom user interface pre-installed. The S Pen offers expanded software features, including “Live Message” for the creation of handwritten notes combined with emojis resulting in short animated GIFs. Users can remove the S Pen from the device and immediately write notes on the display through “Screen Off Memo,” which works due to the screen's always-on capabilities. The screen can collect up to 100 notes and allows the user to easily go back to notes pinned directly on the always-on screen. A “Translate” feature now recognizes punctuation marks, letting users highlight entire sentences rather than single words, and supports 71 different languages. The edges of the screen on the Note 8 allow the user to open two apps at once in a multi-window view, dubbed “App Pair.” In the Camera application, a new “Live Focus” effect lets users adjust the intensity of background blur both before and after capturing photos, while “Dual Capture” makes both rear cameras take individual photos of the same subject, with one acting as a close-up shot and the other from a distance capturing the whole scene.

The Samsung Galaxy Note 8 received an Android 8.0 “Oreo” update on March 30, 2018, with Samsung's custom skin overlaid. The software update brought enhancements and changes in the user interface, with the menu options in the home screen and settings streamlined. The Edge lighting has also been improved with introductions to new lighting options. The Oreo update also brought enhanced stability to the Samsung DEX (UI/UE) docking system as well as introduced improvements to the DeX interface, where the Apps screen displays in full screen instead of in a pop-up window. An update to Android 9 Pie was released on 26 February 2019, which brought One UI to the phone alongside its new features.

== Variants ==
=== Japanese models ===
==== au SCV37 ====
On October 11, 2017, au (KDDI) announced the localized Galaxy Note 8 as the "SCV37", which includes an improved S-pen stylus pen and supports 3CC CA network paird with a 4×4 MIMO connectivity standard and a 256QAM multi-level connectivity and was released on October 26. This enables peak download speeds of up to 708 Mbps in select areas of Tokyo, Nagoya, and Osaka. It was also the first au-based Galaxy Note 8 for three years.

===== Other features =====
Main features and supported services
au Widget Web Browser	Uta Pass Uta Pass Music Player (Hi-Res Audio version) LISMO WAVE	Osaifu-Keitai NFC (Payment compatible) Wireless Charging (Qi) Fingerprint Authentication / Iris Authentication	One Seg Full Seg
au one Mail PC Mail Gmail EZweb Mail	Decoration Mail	Friends Note	PC Document Viewer
Pedometer	GPS Compass	au one Navi Walk au one Passenger Seat Navi	au one News EX au one GREE
au Basic Home Jibun Bank	Emergency Alert Mail	Bluetooth 5.0	Wireless LAN (Wi-Fi) au Share Link
FeliCa	au VoLTE (Sync Call compatible) au 4G LTE (3CC CA compatible)) WiMAX 2+	au World Service	au Femtocell

== Reception ==
Camera testing company DxOMark gave the Note 8 a rating of 94, the joint-highest score of any phone, shared with the iPhone 8 Plus. Just a few days after the report of the Note 8 published was, the Pixel 2 was tested and given a 98 score, besting them both. It was noted that the Note 8 had better optical image stabilization than the IPhone X.

Like the Galaxy S8 and Galaxy S8+, the Note 8 was heavily criticized for its placement of the fingerprint scanner, which unlike most other Android phones that have the fingerprint scanner placed underneath the rear camera, the S8, S8+ and Note 8 instead had it placed next to the camera, making it uncomfortable and forces many users to shift their hands upwards in order to reach it.

Due to the battery incident with the Note 7, Samsung was more cautious with the Note 8, implementing a slightly smaller battery than the Note 7, which had a 3500 mAh battery; a non-removable 3300mAh lithium-ion battery was used in the Note 8. As a result, the Note 8 did not have the best battery life, and many users did not hold back from complaining about it.

The Note 8 was praised by both consumers and critics for the “Infinity Display” (meaning the display has much smaller bezels than the traditional smartphone), for its "punchy colors” and brightness, which is approximately 1200 nits.

Multiple tech reviewers pointed out that the Note 8 had a weak mono speaker. However, it was also praised for being one of the few 2017 flagships left that still included a headphone jack, unlike most flagships that followed Apple's 2016 controversial decision to remove the headphone jack entirely from the IPhone 7 and 7 Plus, which required users to use the included 3.5 mm headphone jack adapter or use wireless ear buds instead.

== Further information ==
- Android Authority Review
- BGR — Tests show the Note 8 will survive almost anything – even flames..

Preceded by Samsung Galaxy Note 7 (Discontinued and recalled); Samsung Galaxy Note Fan Edition	Samsung Galaxy Note 8; 2017	Succeeded by Samsung Galaxy Note 9
