= Samsung Galaxy S7 =

2016 Android smartphones by Samsung Electronics

Samsung Galaxy S7 series

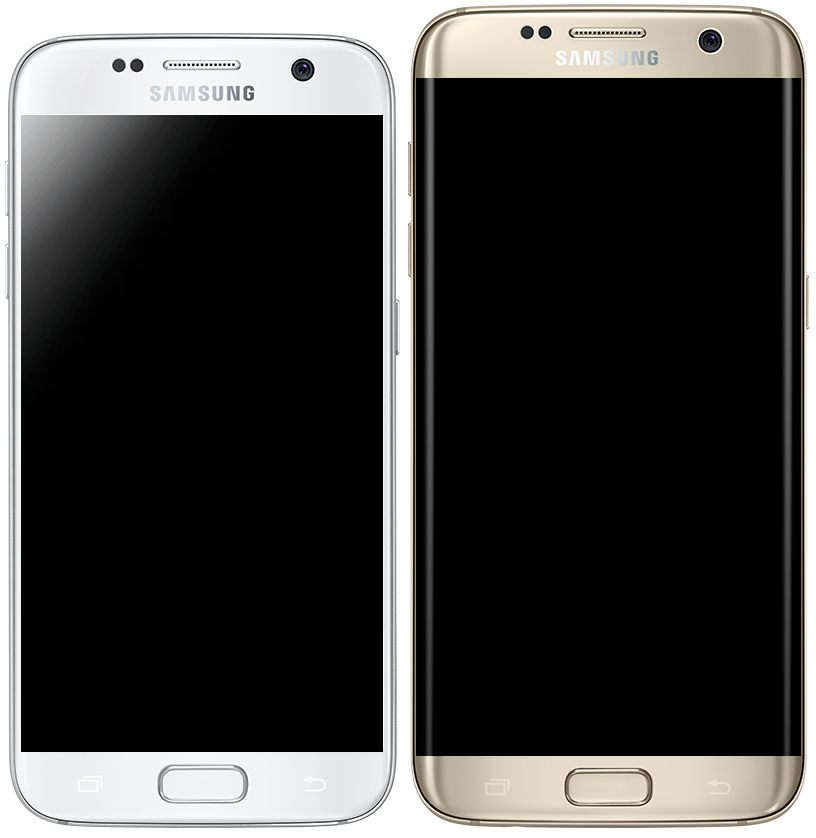
- Samsung Galaxy S7 in White and S7 Edge in Gold
- Brand: Samsung
- Manufacturer: Samsung Electronics
- Type: Smartphone
- Series: Galaxy S
- Family: Samsung Galaxy
- First released: S7 and S7 Edge: February 21, 2016; 10 years ago S7 Active: June 4, 2016; 10 years ago
- Availability by region: S7 and S7 Edge: March 11, 2016; 10 years ago S7 Active: June 10, 2016; 10 years ago
- Discontinued: April 21, 2017; 9 years ago
- Units sold: 55 million units
- Predecessor: Samsung Galaxy S6
- Successor: Samsung Galaxy S8
- Related: Samsung Galaxy Note 7
- Compatible networks: 2G GSM/GPRS/EDGE – 850, 900, 1800, 1900 MHz; 2G CDMA 1xRTT – 800, 850, 1900 MHz; 3G TD-SCDMA – 1900, 2000 MHz; 3G UMTS/HSDPA/HSUPA/HSPA+ – 850, 900, AWS (1700), 1900, 2000, 2100 MHz; 4G LTE – Bands 1–5, 7–8, 12–13, 17–20, 25–26, 28–30, 38–41
- Form factor: Slate
- Dimensions: S7: 142.4 mm (5.61 in) H 69.6 mm (2.74 in) W 7.9 mm (0.31 in) D; S7 Edge: 150.9 mm (5.94 in) H 72.6 mm (2.86 in) W 7.7 mm (0.30 in) D; S7 Active: 148.8 mm (5.86 in) H 74.9 mm (2.95 in) W 9.9 mm (0.39 in) D
- Weight: S7: 152 g (5.4 oz); S7 Edge: 157 g (5.5 oz); S7 Active: 184.8 g (6.52 oz)
- Operating system: Original: Android 6.0.1 "Marshmallow" with TouchWiz Hero UX; Current: Android 8.0 "Oreo" with Samsung Experience 9.0
- System-on-chip: Global: Samsung Exynos 8890; USA and China: Qualcomm Snapdragon 820
- CPU: Exynos: Octa-core (4x2.3 GHz Mongoose & 4x1.6 GHz Cortex-A53); Snapdragon: Quad-core (2x2.15 GHz Kryo & 2x1.6 GHz Kryo)
- GPU: Exynos: Mali-T880 MP12; Snapdragon: Adreno 530
- Memory: 4 GB LPDDR4 RAM
- Storage: 32, 64 or 128 GB UFS 2.0
- Removable storage: microSDXC, expandable up to 256 GB
- SIM: 1x or 2x nanoSIM
- Battery: All internal: S7: 3,000 mAh, 3.85 V; S7 Edge: 3,600 mAh; S7 Active: 4,000 mAh
- Charging: Wired: Qualcomm Quick Charge 2.0 up to 15 W Wireless: Qi and AirFuel Inductive wireless charging up to 7.5 W
- Rear camera: Samsung ISOCELL S5K2L1 or Sony Exmor RS IMX260 12 MP (4032×3024), 1.4 μm pixel size, f/1.7 aperture, 2160p(4K) at 30fps(limited to 10 m since Android 7 update), 1440p(QHD) at 30fps, 1080p at 30/60fps, 720p at 30/60fps, real-time slow motion video recording at 720p@240fps
- Front camera: Samsung S5K4E6 5 MP (2592×1464), f/1.7 aperture, 1440p/1080p/720p video recording
- Display: S7: 5.1 in (130 mm) 227 ppcm (577 ppi); S7 Edge: 5.5 in (140 mm) 210 ppcm (534 ppi); S7 Active: 5.1 in (130 mm) 227 ppcm (576 ppi); Quad HD Super AMOLED 2560×1440 pixel resolution (16:9 aspect ratio) (all Diamond PenTile)
- External display: Always-on display
- Connectivity: Wi-Fi 802.11a/b/g/n/ac (2.4 & 5 GHz), Bluetooth 4, 4G/LTE
- Water resistance: IP68, up to 1.5 m (4.9 ft) for 30 minutes
- Model: SM-G930 (S7); SM-G935 (S7 Edge); SM-G891A (S7 Active); (Last letter varies by carrier and international models.)
- Codename: Project Lucky (herolte, hero2lte); Poseidon (S7 Active)
- Website: www.samsung.com/global/galaxy/galaxy-s7/

The Samsung Galaxy S7 and S7 Edge are Android-based smartphones manufactured, released and marketed by Samsung Electronics. The S7 series served as the successor to the Galaxy S6, S6 Edge, S6 Active and S6 Edge+ released in 2015. The S7 and S7 Edge were officially unveiled on 21 February 2016 during a Samsung press conference at Mobile World Congress, with a European and North American release on 11 March 2016. The Samsung Galaxy S7 Active was unveiled on 4 June 2016, and released on AT&T in the United States on 10 June 2016.

The Samsung Galaxy S7 was an evolution of the prior year's model, with upgraded hardware, design refinements, and the restoration of features removed from the Galaxy S6, such as IP68 certification for water and dust resistance, as well as expandable storage with a microSD card. Succeeding the S6 and S6 Edge+, respectively, the Samsung Galaxy S7 was produced in a standard model with a display size of 5.1-inch (130 mm) as well as an Edge variant whose display is curved along the wide sides of the screen and also has a larger 5.5-inch (140 mm) display. For the S7 series, Samsung did not produce a direct 5.1-inch (130 mm) S6 Edge successor. The S7 Active features a thicker and more rugged frame, with an increased battery capacity. The Galaxy S7 and S7 Edge are the last two phones in the Samsung Galaxy S series to have a physical home button with a front-sided fingerprint sensor embedded in the button. The S7 Active is the last in the Active series to feature three physical buttons with the fingerprint reader embedded home button, when not considering the prematurely discontinued Galaxy Note 7. It is the last phone in the Samsung Galaxy S series to be equipped with a microUSB port, which has since been replaced with USB-C technology. The Samsung Galaxy S7, S7 Edge, and S7 Active are the last models to feature the Samsung logo on the top bezel, as the Samsung Galaxy S8 and later removed it entirely. The Galaxy S7 Edge was the last Edge model until the S25 Edge.

The Samsung Galaxy S7 was succeeded by the Samsung Galaxy S8 in April 2017.

== Specifications ==
=== Hardware ===
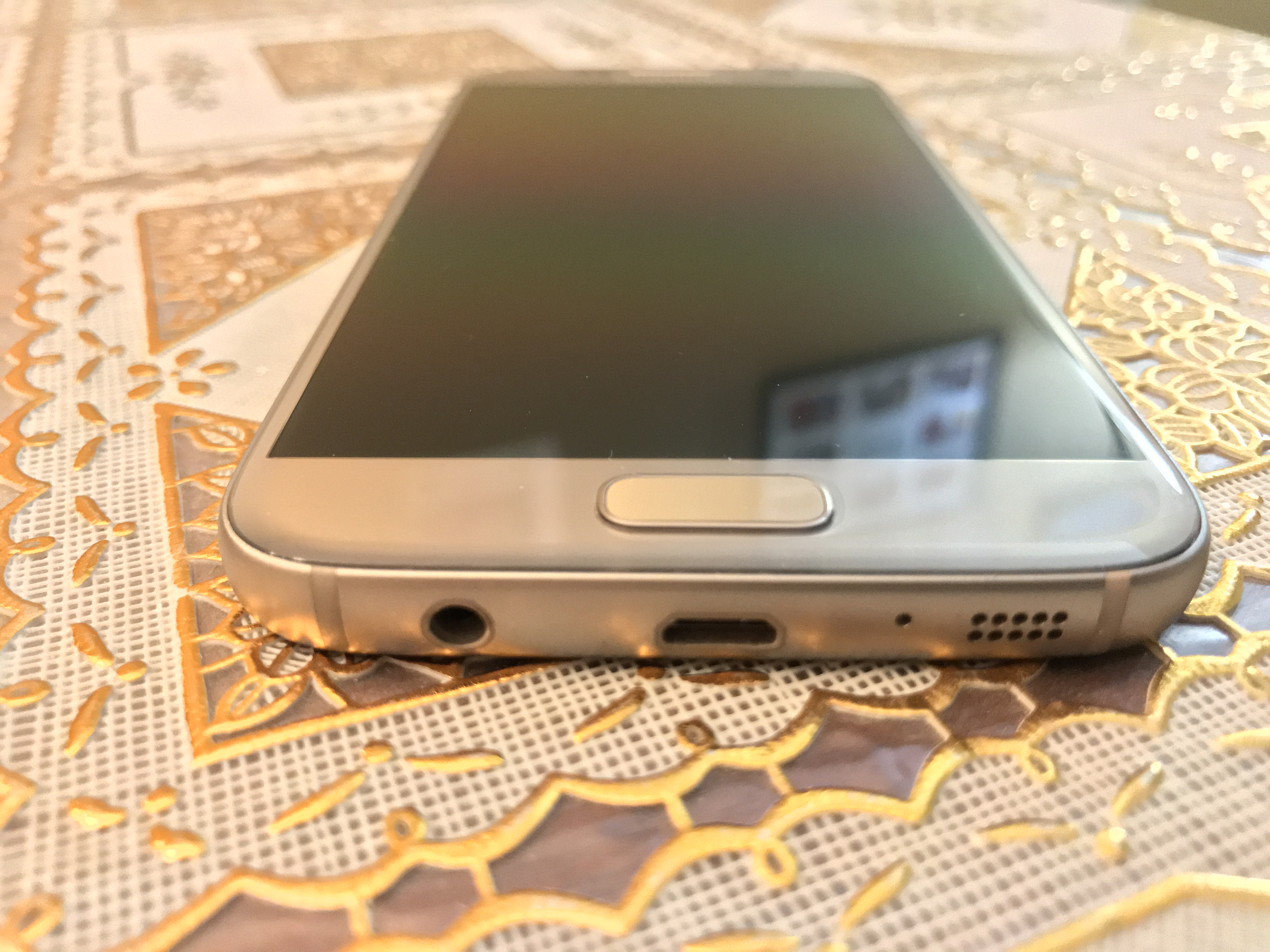
Gold Galaxy S7 showing the headphone jack, micro USB 2.0 port, microphone and speaker grill

==== Design ====
The Galaxy S7's hardware design is largely that of the S6. Samsung removed the built-in Infrared blaster due to low demand. The device retains the metal and glass chassis, but with refinements such as a rectangular home button, and a lower protrusion of the camera. Both models were available in black and gold colors; white, pink, blue and silver versions are available depending on market. As a Worldwide Olympic Partner, special editions of the Galaxy S7 Edge were released by Samsung for the 2016 Summer Olympics, with a dark blue body and hardware and software accents inspired by the colors of the Olympic rings. The devices were sold in limited quantities in selected markets, and were given to athletes participating in the 2016 Summer Olympics. In October 2016, Samsung announced a new light blue ("Blue Coral") color option, as previously offered on the recalled Galaxy Note 7.

The Galaxy S7 Edge is equipped with software that allows the curved edge to act as a ruler, a night clock and various visual notification features such as the Edge notification light for phone calls and incoming messages, of which the preferred color can be selected for five contacts. There is an additional setting that allows adjusting the brightness of the built-in LED lamp when used as a torch between five brightness levels.

==== Water resistance ====
The S7, S7 Edge & S7 Active are IP68-certified for dust and water resistance; unlike the Galaxy S5, the ports are sealed and thus do not require protective flaps. The S7, S7 Edge & S7 Active feature a 1440p Quad HD Super AMOLED display; the S7 & S7 Active both have a 5.1-inch panel, while the S7 Edge uses a larger 5.5-inch panel. As with the prior model, the S7 Edge's screen is curved along the side bezels of the device.

The charging port of the Galaxy S7 is equipped with a moisture sensor. When it detects moisture inside the USB port, wired charging is deactivated to prevent damage to the equipment.

==== Batteries ====
All three models (S7, S7 Edge & S7 Active) have larger batteries in comparison to the S6, with 3000 mAh, 3600 mAh & 4000 mAh capacity respectively and support for AirFuel Inductive (formerly PMA) and Qi wireless charging standards; however, the S7 still uses a microUSB Type-B connector.

For wired charging, Qualcomm Quick Charge 2.0 with up to 15 watts is supported. Wireless charging is supported with 7.5 watts of effective power through a Qi 1.2 supported wireless charging plate connected to a Qualcomm Quick Charge 2.0 USB charger.

Samsung claims the Galaxy S7 is able to be fully charged using wired and wireless fast charging within 90 and 140 minutes respectively, while 100 and 160 minutes respectively on the S7 edge.

Fast charging is disabled while the device is in operation.

==== Camera ====
The Galaxy S7 and S7 edge feature a 12-megapixel (4032×3024) rear-facing camera with "Dual Pixel" image sensor technology for faster autofocus and an f/1.7 aperture lens.

Slow motion videos are recorded with 720p HD at 240 fps, which is twice the frame rate used on the Galaxy S6 and Note 5. For the first time on a Samsung flagship device, slow motion video recording at 240fps is possible. The 240 fps footage is encoded in real-time and recorded with audio. The footage can be edited with the included slow motion video editing software. The five-minute time limit for 2160p video has been removed.

The improved burst shot mode captures twenty full-resolution photos per second up to one hundred photos per row. The limit was raised from the thirty photos per sequence at approximately eight photos per second on the S6.

The camera has been praised for its then excellent low-light performance.

Still photos can be captured during 1440p (30 fps) and 2160p (30 fps) video recording, while the predecessor could only do so at up to 1080p. However, still photos can not be captured during 1080p video recording at 60 frames per second.

The camera software of the Galaxy S7 has a mode for the manual adjustment of operating parameters, such as exposure, ISO light sensitivity, white balance, and exposure value. Parameters can also be set for video recording. However, the ISO light sensitivity and exposure settings are locked during video recording. In addition, the LED torch can not be toggled during video recording.

==== Chipsets ====
The Galaxy S7 devices are equipped with either a quad-core Qualcomm Snapdragon 820 SoC on the US variants, or the in-house octa-core Samsung Exynos 8890 SoC everywhere else. The US variants support older CDMA networks that are extensively used by carriers there. The processor is cooled with a 0.4mm thick 'liquid cooling' heat pipe cooling system that transfers the heat from the processor and onto the body of the phone. It is used alongside the graphite thermal pads in the previous Galaxy S6.

The Galaxy S7 devices come with 4 GB of LPDDR4 RAM and either 32, 64 or 128 GB of internal storage (with the 128 GB option being exclusive to the S7 Edge). Storage can be expanded externally using a microSD card, inserted using the SIM tray built into the phone (with dual SIM models utilizing the shared second SIM slot to allow the simultaneous use of two SIM cards at the same time, or just a single SIM card alongside a microSD card).

The Galaxy S7 devices include a USB OTG adapter in the box. It can be used either as a regular adapter to attach USB devices (like flash drives, wired peripherals or the like), or it can be used with Samsung's "Smart Switch" application used to easily transfer data, media and settings from a previous Samsung Galaxy or Android device running Android 4.3 or later, iPhones running iOS 5 or later, or BlackBerry devices running BlackBerry OS 7 or earlier.

=== Software ===
==== Stock software ====
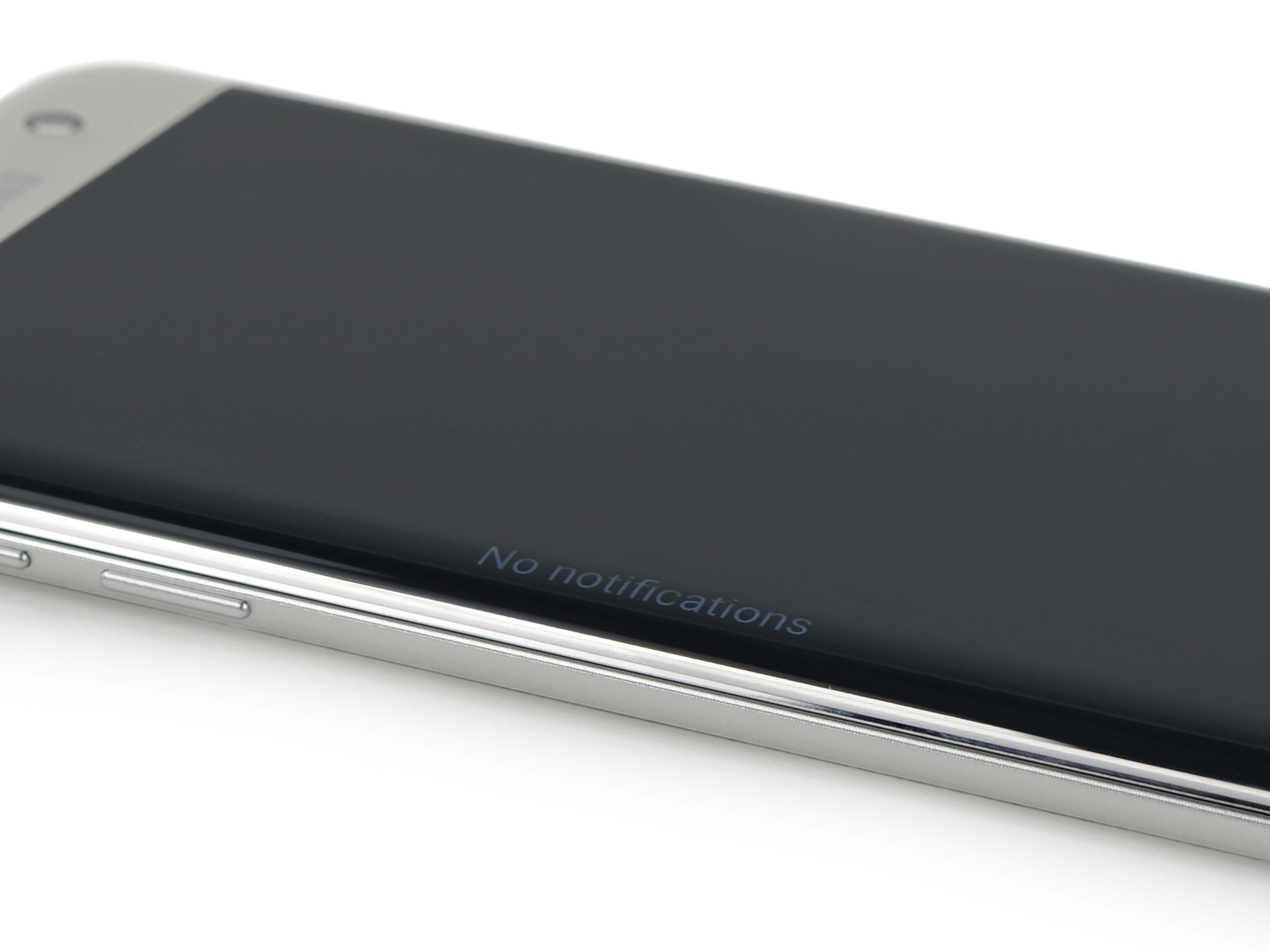
The edge feeds feature

The Galaxy S7 ships with Android Marshmallow (6.0) and Samsung's proprietary TouchWiz Hero UX software suite, and would be supported for two years of OS and UI updates, and 4 years of security updates. The new Hero UX also allows the user to disable the app drawer. A new "always on" functionality displays a clock, calendar, and notifications on-screen when the device is in standby. The display is turned off if the device's proximity sensor detects that it is in an enclosed space such as a pocket. Samsung claims this feature would only consume half a percentage of battery capacity per-hour. New widget panes can be displayed on the edge of the S7 Edge, in "Edge Single" and wider "Edge Single Plus" sizes. Android Marshmallow's "adopted storage" feature is disabled and not usable.

A software update in September 2016 added support for Vulkan, a new low-level graphics API. In January 2017, Samsung released an update to Android 7.0 "Nougat", which replaced TouchWiz with the Samsung Experience 8.0 software suite (introduced in the Galaxy S8). In mid 2018, the S7 and S7 edge received Android 8.0 "Oreo" with Samsung Experience 9.0, which was the last major version of Android available for the S7 family, and later reached its end of life in April 2020 with the security patch, making it the seventh major Samsung flagship release to provide two OS upgrades for its flagship phones released before 2019.

The user interface of the multi windowing feature which allows showing multiple supported applications simultaneously on the screen, both as flexible split screen, as well as floating pop-up, is similar to the preceding Galaxy S6.

==== Custom ROMs ====
Some models of the Galaxy S7 series allow for bootloader unlocking and custom ROM installs, and as a result the phone can run Android 10 with One UI 2.5 and can be updated to Android 12 with the degoogled /e/OS.

== Reception ==
The Galaxy S7 received generally positive reviews with critics praising the return of the microSD card slot and water resistance, while retaining the premium metal design of the preceding Galaxy S6. The design of the larger Galaxy S7 Edge was particularly praised, as its curved sides on the S7 Edge are used to "make the phone much narrower than it would be if it had a flat display. It makes the whole device smaller and easier to use. That becomes readily apparent when you put the S7 Edge next to other devices with 5.5-inch or similar screens" like the iPhone 6s Plus (5.5-inch) and Google Nexus 6P (5.7-inch). The quality of the primary (rear-facing) camera has been further improved, despite the megapixel decrease from 16 MP to 12 MP, it has larger 1.4-micron pixels and even faster focusing than its S6 predecessor.

There was some criticism of the Galaxy S7, due to the removal of MHL support and the IR Blaster of the Galaxy S6, stock music and video player apps have been replaced by the online-focused Google Play equivalents, and the inclusion of a Micro USB charging port instead of a USB Type C port.

The Exynos version is faster than the Qualcomm Snapdragon version at multitasking. There is a clear difference, as the Qualcomm version fails to keep as many apps in the background and takes more time to switch between apps. However, the Snapdragon version performs better in graphically intensive apps and games.

iFixit gave the S7 a repairability score of 3 out of 10, noting an excessive use of glue and glass panels, as well as it being nearly impossible to service certain components of the device (such as the daughterboard and other components) without removing the screen, which is not designed to be removed, and that "replacing the glass without destroying the display is probably impossible".

=== Sales ===
Between the Samsung Galaxy S7 and the Samsung Galaxy S7 Edge, approximately 100,000 devices were sold within two days of the official launch in South Korea. The Galaxy S7 had between 7-9 million units shipped in its first month. A total of 48 million units were sold in 2016.

Galaxy S7 Edge was the most popular handset from South Korea's 2016 lineup. The Galaxy J3, which is regarded as an entry-level device, found its place as the sixth most popular phone for 2016. The iPhone 6s had around 60 million shipments, whereas the Galaxy S7 edge and other phones from Samsung garnered around 25 million shipments.

== Variants ==
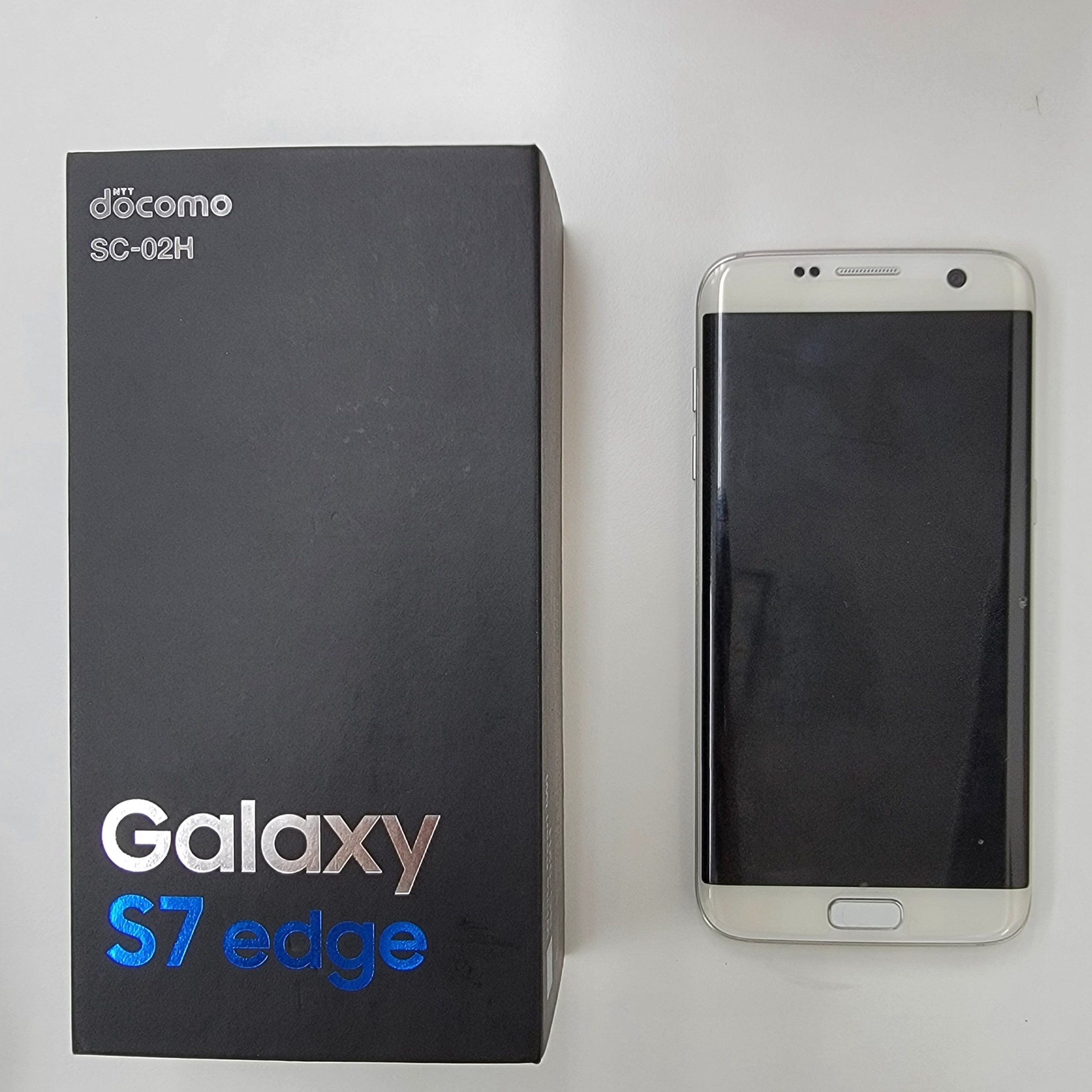
docomo SC-02H

=== Japanese models ===
==== S7 edge SCV33 ====
On May 19, 2016, KDDI and Okinawa Cellular, under its carrier, au by KDDI, announced the localized variant as the "SCV33". It was available at the following color options: Black Onyx, White Pearl, and Pink Gold. In early December, au announced the "Blue Coral" colorway.

===== Special/limited models =====
The "Injustice Edition" was also announced and was exclusively available at au online retailers. Up to 100 units were produced and was released on July 4, 2016. It features an aesthetic black and gold accents to the home button, camera, and speaker.

The "Olympic Games Edition" was announced on July 14, 2016, limited up to 2,016 units. This model was commemorated for the 2016 Summer Olympics at Rio de Janeiro, Brazil. It was released on July 19, 2016. Besides Japan, the device was available in Brazil, the United States, China, Germany, and South Korea.

== Known issues ==
At release, videos recorded at high frame rates stuttered, with both Exynos and Snapdragon models suffering from the issue. A following firmware update claimed to fix "flickering video playback after recording".

Some S7 Edge units have an irremovable vertical pink line on the display, which seems to appear at random. Samsung is offering free repairs/replacements for users in Belgium/Netherlands/Luxembourg (limited to those) under warranty given that the screen is not externally damaged.

It is extremely difficult to repair a broken screen. Removal of the AMOLED panel will be required should the user break the screen on a Galaxy S7.

On September 23, 2016, a make-up artist’s Samsung Galaxy S7 Edge started to diffuse smoke in a beauty salon in Antipolo City, Rizal, Philippines. Samsung said they were investigating the incident.

On November 15, 2016, a Canadian Samsung Galaxy S7 exploded in a man's pocket when he was driving, causing him to get 2nd and 3rd degree burns.

== See also ==
- Comparison of Samsung Galaxy S smartphones
- Samsung Galaxy S series

Preceded by Samsung Galaxy S6	Samsung Galaxy S7; 2016	Succeeded by Samsung Galaxy S8
