= Samsung Galaxy J2 Core (2020) =

Entry-level smartphone

- Brand: Samsung Electronics
- Manufacturer: Samsung Electronics
- Type: Smartphone
- Series: Samsung Galaxy J
- First released: April 27, 2020
- Predecessor: Samsung Galaxy J2 Core (2018)
- Compatible networks: GSM / HSPA / 4G LTE
- Form factor: Slate
- Colors: Black, Gold, Blue
- Dimensions: 143.4 mm (5.65 in) H 72.1 mm (2.84 in) W 8.9 mm (0.35 in) D
- Weight: 154 g (5.4 oz)
- Operating system: Android Oreo (Go edition)
- System-on-chip: Exynos 7570 Quad (14 nm)
- CPU: Quad-core 1.4 GHz Cortex-A53
- GPU: Mali-T720
- Memory: 1 GB RAM
- Storage: 16 GB eMMC 5.0
- Removable storage: microSDXC (dedicated slot) up to 256 GB
- Battery: 2,600 mAh Li-ion (removable)
- Rear camera: 8 MP, f/2.2, AF; LED flash, HDR, panorama Video: 1080p@30fps
- Front camera: 5 MP, f/2.2
- Display: 5.0 in (127 mm) PLS LCD; 540 x 960 pixels, 16:9 ratio (~220 ppi density)
- Sound: Loudspeaker, 3.5mm jack
- Connectivity: Wi-Fi 802.11 b/g/n, Wi-Fi Direct, hotspot Bluetooth 4.2, A2DP; GPS (with A-GPS, GLONASS, BDS); Micro-USB 2.0, USB OTG
- Model: SM-J260FU, SM-J260GU, SM-J260MU

The Samsung Galaxy J2 Core (2020) is a refeshed version of the J2 Core and low-end smartphone manufactured and branded by Samsung. It was released on April 27, 2020 in India.

== Specifications ==
=== Hardware ===
The device features a 5.0-inch PLS TFT LCD display with a qHD resolution of 540 x 960 pixels and a 16:9 aspect ratio (~220 ppi density). It is powered by the Samsung Exynos 7570 Quad (14 nm) chipset, consisting of a quad-core 1.4 GHz Cortex-A53 CPU and a Mali-T720 GPU. Unlike the 2018 model, which came with 8 GB of storage, the 2020 edition is equipped with 16 GB of internal eMMC 5.0 storage and 1 GB of RAM. The storage is expandable via a dedicated microSDXC slot.

=== Cameras ===
The phone has a single 8 MP rear camera with an f/2.2 aperture, autofocus, and an LED flash. It supports HDR and panorama modes and is capable of recording video at 1080p at 30fps. The front-facing "selfie" camera is a 5 MP sensor with an f/2.2 aperture.

=== Battery and connectivity ===
The Galaxy J2 Core (2020) is powered by a removable Li-Ion 2600 mAh battery. It was claimed that the device lasts about 14 to 15 hours.

Connectivity options include Wi-Fi 802.11 b/g/n, Bluetooth 4.2, GPS (with A-GPS, GLONASS, and BDS), and a microUSB 2.0 port with USB On-The-Go support. It also retains a 3.5mm headphone jack and an FM radio.

=== Software ===
The device launched with Android 8.1 Oreo (Go edition), a version of Android optimized for low-end smartphones with optimized Google apps. Also, it was available with Android Pie mobile OS.

=== Design ===
The phone measures 143.4 x 72.1 x 8.9 mm and weighs 154 grams. It is constructed with a glass front, a plastic back, and a plastic frame. It was made available in three colors: Black, Gold, and Blue.
