= Samsung Galaxy J8 =

2018 Android smartphone manufactured by Samsung Electronics

Samsung Galaxy J8/On8 (2018)

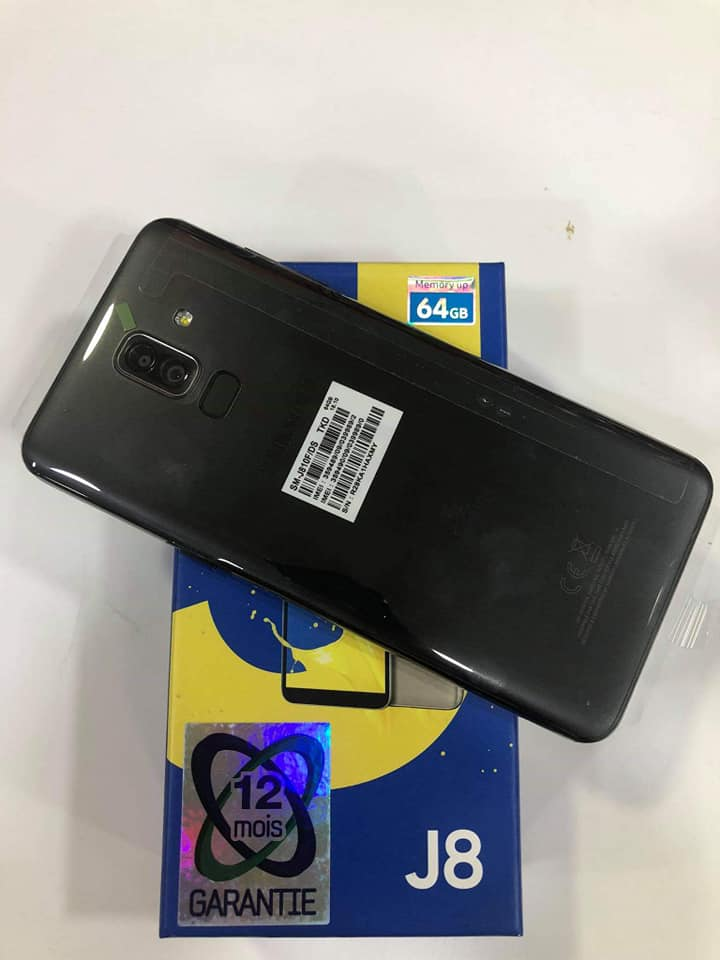
- The back panel of the Galaxy J8 in black
- Brand: Samsung
- Manufacturer: Samsung Electronics
- Type: Phablet
- Series: Galaxy J/Galaxy On
- First released: July 2018; 8 years ago
- Discontinued: April 2019
- Predecessor: Samsung Galaxy J7 (2017)
- Successor: Samsung Galaxy M20; Samsung Galaxy A30
- Related: Samsung Galaxy J4; Samsung Galaxy J6
- Compatible networks: 2G GSM/GPRS/EDGE – 850, 900, 1800, 1900 MHz 3G UMTS/HSPA+ – 850, 900, 1900, 2100 MHz; 4G LTE 2100 (1), 1800 (3), 850 (5), 2600 (7), 900 (8), 800 (20) MHz TD-SCDMA
- Form factor: Slate
- Dimensions: 159.2 mm (6.27 in) H 75.7 mm (2.98 in) W 8.2 mm (0.32 in) D
- Weight: 177 g (6.2 oz)
- Operating system: Original: Android 8.0 "Oreo" with Samsung Experience 9.0; Current: Android 10 with One UI 2.0
- System-on-chip: Qualcomm Snapdragon 450
- CPU: 1.8 GHz Octa core Cortex-A53
- GPU: Adreno 506
- Memory: 3 GB, 4 GB
- Storage: 32 GB, 64 GB
- Removable storage: Up to 512 GB microSDXC
- Battery: 3500 mAh (22.00 Wh V) Li-ion
- Rear camera: List: 16 + 5 MP (4608×3456 pixels) back-side illuminated sensor; 1080p Full HD Video Recording @ 30fps; Autofocus; LED flash; Digital zoom:10.0 x; Face detection; Exposure compensation; ISO control; White balance presets; Burst mode; Geo tagging; High-dynamic-range mode (HDR); Panorama; Macro mode; Night mode; Portrait mode; Scenes; Effects; Self-timer
- Front camera: 16.0 MP, HD video (1080p) at 30 fps
- Display: 6.00 in (152 mm) RGB Super AMOLED; 1480x720 px, HD (274 PPI); Corning Gorilla Glass
- Connectivity: 3.5 mm TRRS; Wi-Fi (802.11b/g/n 2.4 GHz); Wi-Fi Direct; Bluetooth 4.2; micro USB 2.0
- Data inputs: Multi-touch sensor, 3-axis, Accelerometer, aGPS, GLONASS
- Website: Galaxy J8 website

The Samsung Galaxy J8 is an Android smartphone developed by Korean manufacturer Samsung Electronics. Announced and released on May 22, 2018 along with the Galaxy J6 and the Galaxy J4, J8 is a mid-range smartphone and the successor to the Galaxy J7 (2017). It shares similar hardware and software features to its counterpart (Samsung Galaxy A6+).

On August 1, 2018, Samsung launched the Samsung Galaxy On8, which was sold exclusively on Flipkart and is a rebranded Samsung Galaxy J8.

== Hardware ==
Samsung Galaxy J8 is a refined version of the hardware design introduced in the Samsung Galaxy J6, it has a rounded polycarbonate chassis. It has a length of 159.2 mm (6.27 in), a width of 75.7 mm (2.98 in), and a thickness of 8.2 mm (0.32 in) and it weighs 177 gram. At the top of the screen, there is a 16 MP (f/1.9) front-facing camera. At the back panel, there is a dual rear camera setup with a 16 MP (f/1.7) main camera and a 5 MP (f/1.9) depth sensor with live focus, portrait mode and background blur options. There are proximity and ambient light sensors, and a notification LED. The Galaxy J8's 6.0 inch display is larger than other phones in the same series launched in 2018. The Super AMOLED screen of the device has ~75.8% screen-to-body ratio, 720x1480 resolution, 18.5:9 aspect ratio, ~274 ppi pixel density and Corning Gorilla Glass protection. It is powered by Qualcomm Snapdragon 450 SoC with 1.8 GHz octa-core ARM Cortex-A53 processor and Adreno 506 GPU backed by 3 GB RAM/32 GB internal storage or 4 GB RAM/64 GB internal storage. It has a 3500 mAh battery.

It is worth noting that even though the Galaxy J8 ships with a 64 bit SoC (Snapdragon 450), the OEM has installed a 32 bit OS using arm_binder64 interface which downgrades the CPU capability by at least 30%.

== See also ==
- Samsung Galaxy
- Samsung Galaxy J series
- Samsung Galaxy J2 Core
- Samsung Galaxy J3 (2018)
- Samsung Galaxy J4 Core
- Samsung Galaxy J6
- Samsung Galaxy J4+
- Samsung Galaxy J6+
