= Samsung Galaxy J3 (2018) =

Android smartphone by Samsung

- Manufacturer: Samsung Electronics
- Type: Smartphone
- Series: Galaxy J series
- First released: July 8, 2018; 8 years ago
- Discontinued: 2019
- Predecessor: Samsung Galaxy J3 Prime
- Successor: Samsung Galaxy A10
- Related: Samsung Galaxy J2 (2018); Samsung Galaxy J7 (2018)
- Compatible networks: 2G GSM 850, 900, 1800, 1900; 3G HSDPA 850, 900, 1700, 1900, 2100; 4G LTE Bands 1, 2, 3, 5, 7, 12, 14, 17, 66
- Form factor: Slate
- Dimensions: 142.7 mm (5.62 in) H 70.1 mm (2.76 in) W 8.9 mm (0.35 in) D
- Weight: 152 g (5.4 oz)
- Operating system: Android 8.0.0 "Oreo"; Samsung Experience; Android 9 "Pie"; One UI (except T-Mobile and Cricket models)
- System-on-chip: Exynos 7570
- CPU: Quad-core (4×1.4 GHz) ARM Cortex-A53
- GPU: ARM Mali-T720MP2
- Memory: 2 GB
- Storage: 16 GB
- Removable storage: microSD up to 400 GB
- Battery: 2600 mAh
- Rear camera: 8 MP, f/1.9, AF; LED flash, panorama, HDR; 1080p@30fps
- Front camera: 5 MP, f/2.2
- Display: 5.0", 720×1280 px (294 ppi) TFT LCD
- Connectivity: WLAN 802.11b/g/n, Bluetooth 4.2, GPS/GLONASS, microUSB 2.0, 3.5 mm headphone jack
- Data inputs: Accelerometer, proximity sensor, gyroscope, compass
- Model: SM-J337x (x varies by carrier and region)
- Other: FM radio
- Website: Galaxy J3 (2018)

The Samsung Galaxy J3 (2018) (also known as Galaxy J3 Star, Galaxy J3 Aura, Galaxy J3 V (2018), Galaxy Amp Prime 3, and Galaxy J3 Orbit) is an Android smartphone manufactured by Samsung Electronics and was released on June 8, 2018.

== Specifications ==
=== Hardware ===
The Galaxy J3 (2018) is powered by an Exynos 7570 SoC including a quad-core 1.4 GHz ARM Cortex-A53 CPU, an ARM Mali-T720MP2 GPU with 2 GB RAM and 16 GB of internal storage which can be upgraded up to 400 GB via microSD card.

It has a 5.62-inch LCD with a 720p resolution. The 8 MP rear camera features f/1.9 aperture, autofocus, LED flash, HDR and Full HD video. The front camera has 5 MP with f/2.2 aperture.

=== Software ===
The Galaxy J3 (2018) is shipped with Android 8.0.0 "Oreo" and Samsung's Experience user interface. Some models can be upgraded to 9 "Pie" and One UI.

== See also ==
- Samsung Galaxy
- Samsung Galaxy J series
- Samsung Galaxy J2 Core
- Samsung Galaxy J4 Core
- Samsung Galaxy J6
- Samsung Galaxy J4+
- Samsung Galaxy J6+
- Samsung Galaxy J8
