= Samsung Galaxy A2 Core =

Budget smartphone from Samsung Electronics

- Brand: Samsung
- Manufacturer: Samsung Electronics
- Type: Smartphone
- Series: Galaxy A series
- First released: April 15, 2019; 7 years ago
- Predecessor: Galaxy J2 Core
- Successor: Galaxy A01 Core/A3 Core
- Related: Samsung Galaxy J4 Core
- Compatible networks: 2G, 3G, LTE
- Form factor: Slate
- Dimensions: 141.6 mm (5.57 in) H 71 mm (2.8 in) W 9.1 mm (0.36 in) D
- Weight: 142 g (5.0 oz)
- Operating system: Android 8.1.0 Oreo Go Edition, Samsung Experience 9.5
- System-on-chip: Exynos 7870
- CPU: Octa-core (8×1.6 GHz) ARM Cortex-A53
- GPU: ARM Mali-T830 MP1
- Memory: 1 GB
- Storage: 8 or 16 GB
- Removable storage: microSD up to 256 GB
- Battery: 2600 mAh
- Rear camera: 5MP f/1.9
- Front camera: 5MP f/2.2
- Display: 5.0", 540×960 qHD IPS LCD, 220 ppi
- Connectivity: microUSB 2.0, Bluetooth 4.2, Wi-Fi, headphone jack
- Model: SM-A260F; SM-A260G

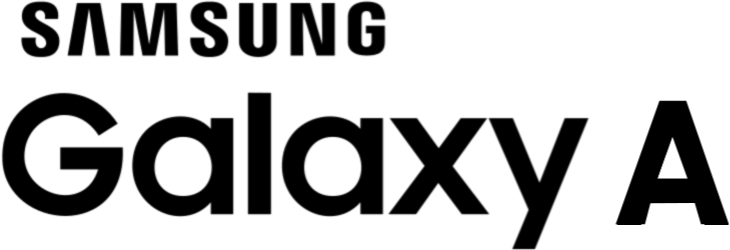

The Samsung Galaxy A2 Core is a budget smartphone manufactured by Samsung Electronics as part of the Galaxy A series lineup. It comes with Android 8 Go Edition and is made for the South and Southeast Asian, Middle Eastern and African market. It is available in four colours (Blue, Black, Red and Gold).

== Specifications ==
=== Hardware ===
The A2 Core features a 5.0 inch IPS 540 × 960 qHD display. It is powered by Exynos 7870 SoC with a 1.6 GHz octa-core CPU and 1 GB of RAM. It is also available with Dual SIM support.

The A2 Core is sold with either 8 or 16 GB internal storage which is upgradable up to 256 GB via microSD card.

=== Software ===
The A2 Core comes with Android 8.1 Oreo in the Go Edition for low-end smartphones with Samsung Experience 9.5. (Operating system update available)

== See also ==
- Samsung Galaxy
- Samsung Galaxy A series
