= Samsung Galaxy J2 Core =

Mobile phone

- Manufacturer: Samsung Electronics
- Type: Smartphone
- Series: Galaxy J series
- First released: August 24, 2018; 8 years ago
- Discontinued: April 2019
- Predecessor: Galaxy J2 (2018)
- Successor: Galaxy A2 Core
- Related: Galaxy J4 Core
- Compatible networks: 2G GSM/GPRS/EDGE 850, 900, 1800, 1900; 3G UMTS/HSDPA 850, 2100; 4G LTE Bands 1, 2, 3, 4, 5, 7, 8, 12, 17, 20, 28, 38, 40, 41
- Form factor: Slate
- Dimensions: 143.4 mm (5.65 in) H 72.1 mm (2.84 in) W 8.9 mm (0.35 in) D
- Weight: 154 g (5.4 oz)
- Operating system: Android 8.1.0 "Oreo Go Edition"; Samsung Experience 9.5
- System-on-chip: Exynos 7570
- CPU: Quad-core (4×1.4 GHz) ARM Cortex-A53
- GPU: ARM Mali-T720
- Memory: 1 GB RAM
- Storage: 8 or 16 GB
- Battery: 2600 mAh
- Charging: 2600mAh battery
- Rear camera: 8 MP f/2.2
- Front camera: 5 MP f/2.2
- Display: 5.0", 540×960 qHD (220 ppi) IPS LCD
- Connectivity: WLAN 802.11b/g/n, Bluetooth 4.2, GPS/GLONASS, microUSB 2.0, 3.5 mm headphone jack
- Model: SM-J260F (EMEA); SM-J260G (Asia); SM-J260M (LATAM); SM-J260Y (Philippines, New Zealand); American Models: SM-J260A (AT&T); SM-J260AZ (Cricket Wireless); SM-J260T1 (Metro by T-Mobile); SM-S260DL (TracFone Wireless); J2 Core 2020: SM-J260FU (EMEA); SM-J260GU (Asia); SM-J260MU (LATAM)
- Other: FM radio, Dual SIM (Duos models only)
- Website: J2 Core

The Samsung Galaxy J2 Core is a low-end smartphone manufactured by Samsung Electronics. It was released in August 2018 with its operating system Android 8.1.0 "Oreo". It is the first Android Go based phone by Samsung.

== Specifications ==
=== Hardware ===
The J2 Core is equipped with a 5.0 inch IPS 540 × 960 qHD display. It is powered by an Exynos 7570 SoC including a quad-core ARM Cortex-A53 CPU with 1.4 GHz, an ARM Mali-T720 GPU with 1 GB RAM and either 8 or 16 GB internal storage. It is available in Black, Gold and Lavender. A slightly refreshed version was announced in April 2020 with a 8 GB option and a new Blue color replacing Lavender. It has a 8 megapixel rear camera and 5 megapixel front camera.

=== Software ===
The J2 Core ships with Android 8.1.0 "Oreo" and Samsung's Experience UI. It's a special version named Go edition which is developed for low-end smartphones. A plan was made to update it to Android 9 in 2019, however the update was cancelled.

== See also ==
- Samsung Galaxy
- Samsung Galaxy J series
- Samsung Galaxy J3 (2018)
- Samsung Galaxy J4 Core
- Samsung Galaxy J6
- Samsung Galaxy J6+
- Samsung Galaxy J4+
- Samsung Galaxy J8

Preceded by Samsung Galaxy J2 (2018)	Samsung Galaxy J2 Core; 2018	Succeeded by Samsung Galaxy A2 Core
