= Samsung Galaxy J7 (2018) =

2018 mid-range smartphone by Samsung Electronics

- Also known as: Galaxy J7 V (for Verizon); Galaxy J7 Star (for T-Mobile/Metro PCS); Galaxy J7 Refine (for Sprint, Virgin Mobile, Boost Mobile); Galaxy Wide3 (in South Korea)
- Brand: Samsung
- Manufacturer: Samsung Electronics
- Type: Smartphone
- Series: Galaxy J
- Family: Samsung Galaxy
- Availability by region: July 2018; 8 years ago
- Predecessor: Samsung Galaxy J7 Prime (2017)
- Successor: Sansung Galaxy Wide4
- Related: Samsung Galaxy J2 (2018); Samsung Galaxy J3 (2018)
- Compatible networks: GSM / HSPA / LTE
- Form factor: Slate
- Dimensions: 153.2×76.2×8.6 mm (6.03×3.00×0.34 in)
- Weight: 181 g (6 oz)
- Operating system: Android 8.0 Oreo (upgradable to Android 9.0 Pie) with One UI
- System-on-chip: Samsung Exynos 7870 Octa (14 nm)
- CPU: Octa-core (8×1.6 GHz ARM Cortex-A53)
- GPU: ARM Mali-T830 MP1
- Memory: 2 GB RAM
- Storage: 16 GB/32 GB eMMC 5.1
- Removable storage: microSDXC (dedicated slot, expandable up to 512 GB)
- Battery: Li-Ion 3300 mAh, non-removable
- Rear camera: 13 MP, LED flash, HDR, panorama
- Front camera: 5 MP or 13 MP (operator-dependent)
- Display: 5.5″ TFT LCD, 720×1280 pixels (~267 ppi)
- Connectivity: Wi-Fi 802.11 a/b/g/n/ac; Bluetooth 4.1/4.2; GPS; NFC (operator-dependent); USB microUSB 2.0 OTG; 3.5mm headphone jack

The Samsung Galaxy J7 (2018) is a mid-range Android-based smartphone manufactured and developed by Samsung Electronics and released in July 2018, as part of its Galaxy J series. It was designed to offer an affordable option while incorporating some premium features such as Gorilla Glass 5 protection and a robust Exynos processor.

== Specifications ==
=== Hardware ===
The Galaxy J7 (2018) features a 5.5‑inch TFT LCD display with a resolution of 720×1280 pixels, resulting in an approximate pixel density of 267 ppi. The hardware is powered by the Samsung Exynos 7870 Octa chipset, built on a 14 nm process with an octa‑core processor running at 1.6 GHz and an ARM Mali-T830 MP1 graphics processing unit, making it suitable for everyday tasks and moderate gaming.

Internally, the device is equipped with 2 GB of RAM and is available in two storage configurations – 16 GB or 32 GB of internal storage. Additionally, storage can be expanded via a dedicated microSDXC slot that supports cards up to 512 GB. The phone’s build consists of a plastic back and frame, paired with a front panel that is protected by Corning Gorilla Glass 5 for added durability.

=== Software ===
At launch, the Galaxy J7 (2018) ran on Android 8.0 Oreo with Samsung Experience 9.0. It has since received an upgrade to Android 9.0 Pie and operates with Samsung’s One UI. When it was released in 2018, Samsung typically provided two years of software updates for its devices, which led many to expect an upgrade to Android 10. However, the Galaxy J7 (2018) was only updated to Android 9 Pie, leaving it on that version instead of reaching Android 10.

=== Connectivity ===
In addition to support for GSM, HSPA, and LTE networks, the Galaxy J7 (2018) incorporates various connectivity options. These include dual-band Wi-Fi (802.11 a/b/g/n/ac), Bluetooth 4.1/4.2, GPS, and—depending on the operator—NFC. The device also features a standard 3.5mm headphone jack and supports USB On-The-Go (OTG), which enables users to connect external devices such as flash drives or keyboards.

=== Camera ===
The smartphone is equipped with a single rear camera boasting a 13 MP sensor that includes features such as LED flash, HDR, and panorama modes. The front camera configuration is operator-dependent and is available in either a 5 MP or a 13 MP variant, catering to users' selfie and video-calling needs.

== Variants ==
The device was marketed under different model numbers across various regions (such as SM-J737A, SM-J737U, SM-J737T, etc.), with the operator-specific models sometimes featuring slight differences in software or hardware configurations.

== See also ==
- Samsung Galaxy J series
- Android (operating system)
- Samsung Electronics
