= Vivo Y95 =

2018 smartphone model

vivo Y95
- Brand: vivo
- First released: Philippines: November 13, 2018
- Colors: Starry Night, Nebula Purple, Aurora Red
- Dimensions: 155.1×75.1×8.3 mm (6.11×2.96×0.33 in)
- Weight: 163.5 g (5.75 oz)
- Operating system: Android 8.1 (Oreo) with Funtouch 4.5
- System-on-chip: Qualcomm SDM439 Snapdragon 439 (12 nm)
- CPU: Octa-core (4x1.95 GHz Cortex-A53 & 4x1.45 GHz Cortex-A53)
- GPU: Adreno 505
- Memory: 3 GB or 4 GB RAM
- Storage: 32 GB or 64 GB eMMC 5.1
- Removable storage: microSDXC (dedicated slot)
- Battery: 4,030 mAh non-removable
- Rear camera: Dual: 13 MP, f/2.2, PDAF + auxiliary lens LED flash, HDR, panorama Video: 1080p@30fps
- Front camera: 20 MP, f/2.0, (wide) (Global market); 8 MP, f/2.0 (China market); HDR; Video: 1080p@30fps
- Display: 6.22 in (158 mm) IPS LCD; 720 x 1520 pixels, 19:9 ratio (~270 ppi density)
- Model: 1807

The vivo Y95 is an entry-level Android smartphone designed, manufactured, and marketed by vivo. It was released on November 13, 2018 in the Philippines, then on November 25 for India.

== Specifications ==
=== Hardware ===
It is powered by a 12-nanometer Qualcomm SDM439 Snapdragon 439 chipset. The silicon architecture features an octa-core central processing unit composed of four Cortex-A53 cores running at 1.95 GHz and another four Cortex-A53 cores clocked at 1.45 GHz. Graphical rendering tasks are managed by an integrated Adreno 505 graphics processing unit.

The front of the device houses a 6.22-inch IPS LCD display with a resolution of 720 × 1520 pixels. This configuration yields a 19:9 aspect ratio and an approximate screen pixel density of 270 ppi, resulting in an estimated 82.9% screen-to-body ratio.

The device offers variable memory and storage configurations, including models with either 32GB of internal storage paired with 3GB of RAM, 64GB of storage with 3GB of RAM, or 64GB of storage alongside 4GB of RAM. The internal storage relies on eMMC 5.1 flash memory, and expansion is supported via a dedicated microSDXC card slot.

In India, the Y95 was only offered by 4GB RAM + 64GB internal storage configuration.

=== Cameras ===
On its rear panel, the vivo Y95 carries a dual-camera system featuring a primary 13-megapixel sensor with an f/2.2 aperture and phase-detection autofocus alongside a secondary auxiliary lens. The rear camera module supports an LED flash, high dynamic range imaging, and panoramic photography, and it is capable of recording 1080p video at 30 frames per second. For selfies, the global variant of the phone utilizes a single 20-megapixel front-facing wide camera with an f/2.0 aperture, while the Chinese variant features an 8-megapixel front sensor with an f/2.0 aperture. The front camera setup supports high dynamic range imaging and records video up to 1080p at 30 frames per second.

=== Software ===
The smartphone runs on the Android 8.1 Oreo operating system layered with vivo's proprietary Funtouch 4.5 user interface. The Y95 was also have pre-installed apps like AI Game Mode (also referred to as "Game Assistant" by consumers).
