= Samsung Galaxy J6 =

Smartphone

Samsung Galaxy J6 (2018)/On6

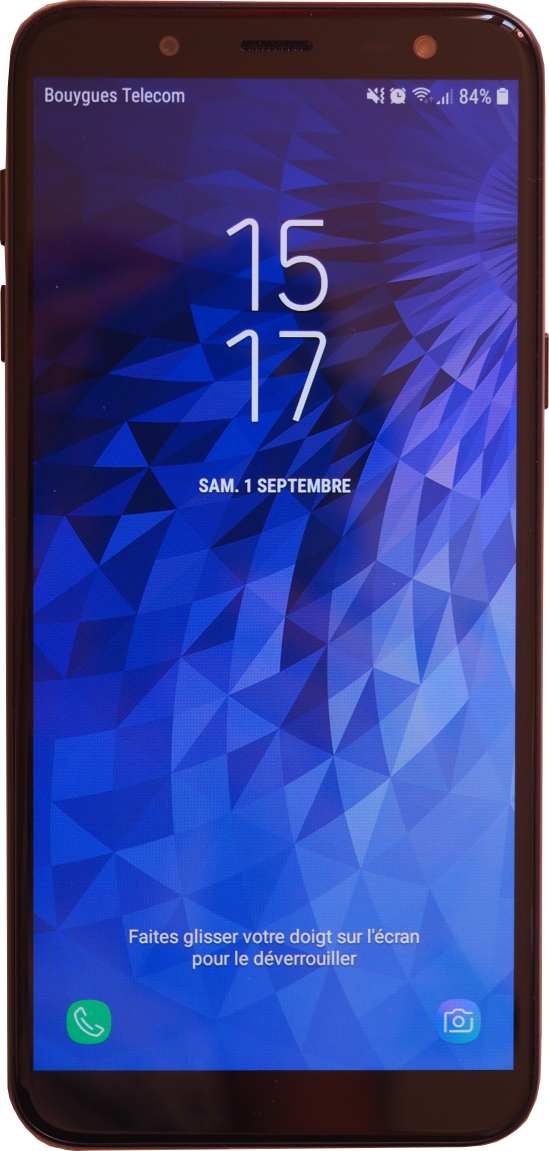
- Galaxy J6
- Brand: Samsung Galaxy
- Manufacturer: Samsung Electronics
- Type: Touchscreen smartphone
- Series: Galaxy J/Galaxy On
- First released: April 2018; 8 years ago
- Discontinued: 2019
- Predecessor: Samsung Galaxy J5 (2017); Samsung Galaxy On5 (2016)
- Successor: Samsung Galaxy A20
- Related: Samsung Galaxy J4; Samsung Galaxy J6+ Samsung Galaxy J8
- Compatible networks: 2G GSM/GPRS/EDGE – 850, 900, 1800, 1900 MHz 3G UMTS/HSPA+ – 850, 900, 1900, 2100 MHz; 4G LTE 2100 (1), 1800 (3), 850 (5), 2600 (7), 900 (8), 800 (20) MHz TD-SCDMA
- Form factor: Slate
- Dimensions: 149.3 x 70.2 x 8.2
- Weight: 154 g (5 oz)
- Operating system: Original: Android 8.0 32 bit- Samsung Experience UI; Current: Android 10 32 bit with One UI 2.0
- System-on-chip: Exynos 7870 Octa (1.6 GHz)
- CPU: Octa-core 1.6 GHz Cortex-A53 64 bit
- GPU: Mali-T830 MP1
- Memory: 3 GB / 4 GB
- Storage: 32 or 64 GB
- Removable storage: microSDXC, expandable up to 256GB
- Battery: Non-removable Li-Ion 3,000 mAh battery
- Rear camera: 13 MP (f/1.9) FHD Recording with led light
- Front camera: 8.0 MP (f/1.9) with Front Flashing Led
- Display: HD+ Super AMOLED, 720 x 1480 pixels, 5.6 inches, 294 pixels per inch (ppi)
- Sound: 1x right side-firing mono speaker + 1x standard low-sound earpiece Dolby Atmos support for headsets
- Connectivity: 3.5 mm TRRS; Wi-Fi (802.11b/g/n 2.4 GHz); Wi-Fi Direct; Bluetooth 4.2; micro USB 2.0; NFC (varies by model)
- Model: SM-J600FN, SM-J600G
- SAR: 1.353 W/kg

The Samsung Galaxy J6 (also called the On6 in some markets like India) is an Android smartphone developed by the Korean manufacturer Samsung Electronics. Announced and released on May 22, 2018 along with the Samsung Galaxy J4 and the Samsung Galaxy J8, the J6 is an entry-level 32-bit smartphone and a successor to the Samsung Galaxy J5 (2017).

The Galaxy J6 is the first in the J-series phones to have a near bezel-less design and to feature a sAMOLED 18.5:9 display.

It has a similar hardware design and software features to its high-end counterpart, the Galaxy A6.

The J6 is succeeded by the J6+ which featured a larger screen albeit switching from the sAMOLED screen found on the J6 to an LCD one.

It has a proximity sensor and accelerometer.

== Hardware ==
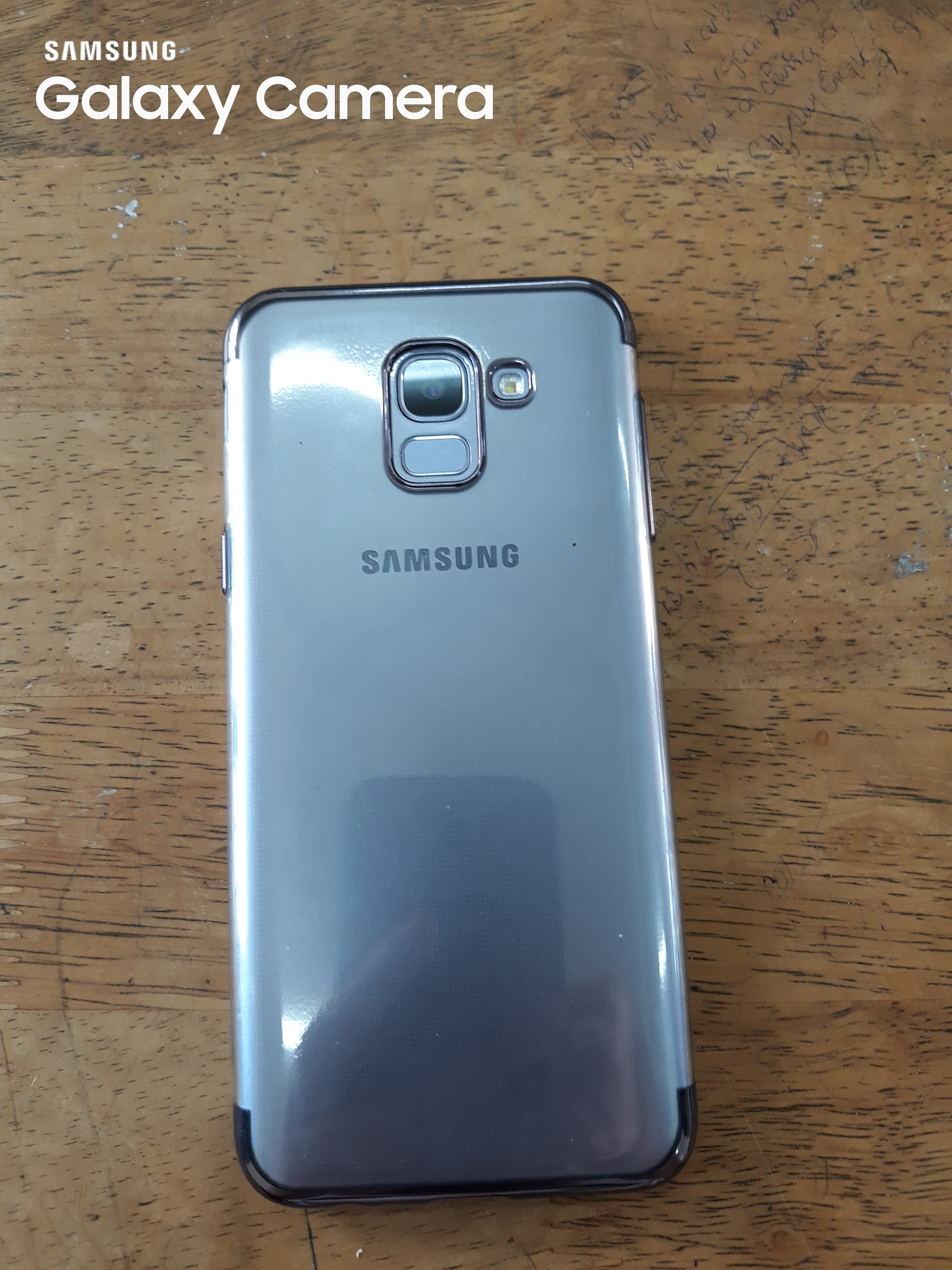
Rear face with fingerprint sensor of the Samsung Galaxy J6 purple lavender 4GB RAM/64GB ROM.

The Samsung Galaxy J6 features a 720p Super AMOLED display, with an 18:5:9 aspect ratio dubbed as Samsung's ‘Infinity Display’. The J6 has a 5.6-inch panel, having around ~76.5% screen-to-body ratio and 294 ppi which was much similar to previous ones in the same line up. The J6's screen is protected by Corning Gorilla Glass 3.

The rear body is made out of plastic (specifically polycarbonate) with the intention to give it the same premium feel as metal-back phones.

The dimensions of the Samsung Galaxy J6 are 149.3 x 70.2 x 8.2 (height x width x thickness). The smartphone weighs 154 grams (5.4 oz).

It is equipped with Samsung's in-house 64 bit octa-core Exynos 7870 which is clocked at a maximum of 1.6 GHz.

Charging the phone's 3,000 mAh lithium-ion battery takes about 2.5 hours on its micro-USB port.

The phone comes with a single 13 MP rear camera with autofocus coupled with an LED flash. The front shooter has 8 MP also with its own front flash. The phone's cameras work well in daylight, though most criticisms point out the bad performance of the cameras in low light.

== Software ==
The Galaxy J6 comes with Samsung Experience 9.0 running on Android 8.0 (Oreo), it runs the 32-bit version despite having a 64-bit processor. It has features like Bixby Home but no Bixby Voice or Vision, Dual Messenger and Dolby Atmos sound enhancement software.

In May 2019, Samsung started rolling out its OTA software update for the Galaxy J6 to have the latest Android 9.0 (Pie) with One UI that also comes with Galaxy S10 phones. The update added features like night mode and a re-styled user interface.

In April 2020, Samsung started rolling out the One UI 2 software update for the Galaxy J6 built on top of Android 10, and it's the last software update it will receive, with security updates provided until at least January 15, 2022. The update added features such as improved dark mode, redesigned quick settings and updated gesture controls.

The phone is secured either by PIN, pattern, password, fingerprint, or facial recognition. Using the fingerprint and/or facial recognition requires one of the three aforementioned traditional security inputs. The phone comes protected by Samsung's Knox software.

== Networking ==
Networking includes:

- Wi-Fi 802.11 b/g/n, Wi-Fi Direct and hotspot (2.4 GHz Wi-Fi networks only, 5 GHz networks are not supported)
- 4G VoLTE connection
- Bluetooth 4.2, A2DP, LE
- GPS, with A-GPS, GLONASS, BDS
- Stereo FM radio with recording option
- USB micro-USB 2
- USB On-The-Go enabled

== Sensors ==
Sensors include

- Proximity sensor
- Accelerometer (dual axis)
- Fingerprint sensor (rear mounted)

== See also ==
- Samsung Galaxy
- Samsung Galaxy J series
- Samsung Galaxy J2 Core
- Samsung Galaxy J3 (2018)
- Samsung Galaxy J4 Core
- Samsung Galaxy J5 (2017)
- Samsung Galaxy J4+
- Samsung Galaxy J6+
- Samsung Galaxy J7 (2018)
- Samsung Galaxy J8
