= Samsung Galaxy J4+ =

Android smartphone by Samsung

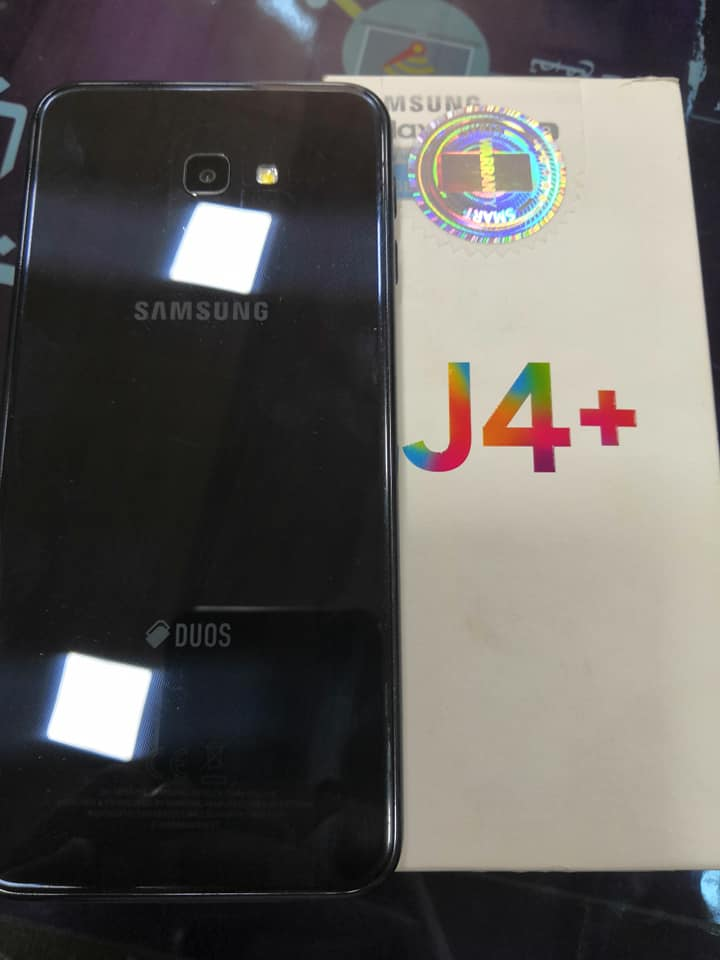
- Galaxy J4+ in black
- Manufacturer: Samsung Electronics
- Type: Smartphone
- Series: Galaxy J series
- First released: October 2018; 8 years ago
- Discontinued: 2019
- Related: Galaxy J4, Galaxy J4 Core, Galaxy J6+
- Compatible networks: 2G GSM 850, 900, 1800, 1900; 3G HSDPA 850, 900, 1700, 1900, 2100; 4G LTE Bands 1, 2, 3, 4, 5, 7, 8, 12, 13, 17, 20, 28, 38, 40, 41, 66
- Form factor: Slate
- Dimensions: 161.4 mm (6.35 in) H 76.9 mm (3.03 in) W 7.9 mm (0.31 in) D
- Weight: 178 g (6.3 oz)
- Operating system: Original: Android 8.1 "Oreo" with Samsung Experience; Current: Android 9 with One UI 1.0
- System-on-chip: Qualcomm Snapdragon 425
- CPU: Quad-core (4×1.4 GHz) ARM Cortex-A53
- GPU: Adreno 308
- Memory: 2 or 3 GB
- Storage: 16 or 32 GB
- Removable storage: microSD up to 256 GB
- Battery: 3300 mAh
- Rear camera: 13 MP, f/1.9
- Front camera: 5 MP, f/.2.2
- Display: 6.0", 720×1480 px (274 ppi) TFT LCD
- Connectivity: WLAN 802.11b/g/n, Bluetooth 4.2, GPS/GLONASS, NFC, microUSB 2.0, 3.5 mm headphone jack
- Data inputs: Accelerometer, proximity sensor, gyroscope, compass, fingerprint sensor
- Model: SM-J415x (x varies by carrier and region)
- Other: FM radio
- Website: Galaxy J4+

The Samsung Galaxy J4+ is an Android smartphone manufactured by Samsung Electronics. It was unveiled on September 19, 2018, and released the following month.

== Specifications ==
=== Hardware ===
The Galaxy J4+ is powered by an Snapdragon 425 SoC including a quad-core 1.4 GHz ARM Cortex-A53 CPU, an Adreno 308 GPU with 2 or 3 GB RAM and either 16 or 32 GB of internal storage which can be upgraded up to 256 GB via microSD card.

It has a 6.0-inch TFT LCD with a HD Ready resolution. The 13 MP rear camera has f/1.9 aperture and features autofocus, LED flash, HDR and Full HD video. The front camera has a 5 MP sensor with an f/2.2 aperture.

=== Software ===
The Galaxy J4+ is shipped with Android 8.1 "Oreo" and Samsung's Experience user interface. In January 2019, an update to 9.0 "Pie" and One UI was announced which became available in April 2019.

== See also ==
- Samsung Galaxy
- Samsung Galaxy J series
- Samsung Galaxy J3 (2018)
- Samsung Galaxy J2 Core
- Samsung Galaxy J4 Core
- Samsung Galaxy J6
- Samsung Galaxy J6+
- Samsung Galaxy J8
