= LG Folder 2 =

- Manufacturer: LG Electronics
- Series: LG Folder series
- First released: April 14, 2020; 6 years ago
- Availability by region: April 17, 2020
- Predecessor: LG Exalt LTE
- Compatible networks: GSM / HSPA / LTE
- Dimensions: 107.9 mm (4.25 in) H 55 mm (2.2 in) W 18 mm (0.71 in) D
- Weight: 127 g (4.5 oz)
- Operating system: Android Oreo
- System-on-chip: Qualcomm MSM8909 Snapdragon 210 (28 nm)
- CPU: Quad-core 1.1 GHz Cortex-A7
- GPU: Adreno 304
- Memory: 1 GB RAM
- Storage: 8 GB
- SIM: Nano-SIM
- Battery: Li-Ion 1470 mAh
- Rear camera: 2 MP; 480p@30 fps
- Front camera: None
- Display: 2.8 inches, 24.3 cm2 (~40.9% screen-to-body ratio); IPS LCD; 240×320 pixels, 4:3 ratio (~143 ppi density)
- Connectivity: Wi-Fi 802.11 b/g/n Bluetooth; A-GPS; FM Radio

The LG Folder 2 is a folder phone released by LG Electronics on April 14, 2020. The phone has a dual-camera setup with a 2 MP main camera, a 2.8-inch 240×320-pixel display, and a 1470 mAh Li-lon battery. It ships with Android Oreo.
