= Cotton Candy (single-board computer) =

- Common manufacturers: ARM Holdings
- Design firm: FXI Technologies
- Introduced: Cotton Candy; November 17, 2011
- Cost: ~US$199 ERP
- Type: Single-board computer
- Processor: Samsung Exynos 4210
- Frequency: 1.2 GHz
- Memory: 1 GB DRAM
- Coprocessor: Mali-400 MP GPU; VFPv3 (VFP/FPU); NEON SIMD; Hardware Audio / Video Decoder; Thumb-2 inst. set Jazelle DBX; Jazelle RCT; TrustZone CESA
- Ports: HDMI 1.3a WiFi 802.11 b/g/n Bluetooth 2.1 + EDR; USB 2.0 host/device Micro USB; MicroSD SDXC slot
- Weight: 21 g (0.74 oz)
- Dimensions: 80 mm (3.1 in) (h); 25 mm (0.98 in) (w); 10 mm (0.39 in) (d)

The Cotton Candy is a very small, fanless single-board computer on a stick, putting the full functions of a personal computer on a device the size of a USB memory stick, manufactured by the Norwegian-based hardware and software for-profit startup company FXI Technologies (also referred to as just "FXI Tech").

== Overview ==
Cotton Candy is a low-power ARM architecture CPU based computer which uses dual-core processors such as the dual-core 1.2 GHz Exynos 4210 (45 nm ARM Cortex-A9 with 1MB L2 cache) system on a chip (SoC) by Samsung, featuring a quad-core 200 MHz ARM Mali-400 MP GPU OpenGL ES 2.0 capable 2D/3D graphics processing unit, an audio and video decoder hardware engine, and TrustZone Cryptographic Engine and Security Accelerator (CESA) co-processor. The platform is said to be able to stream and decode H.264 1080p content, and be able to use desktop-class interfaces such as KDE or GNOME under Linux.

FXI Technologies claims it will run both Android 4.0 (Ice Cream Sandwich) and the latest Ubuntu Desktop Linux operating systems, leveraging Linaro builds and Linux kernel optimizations.

As of 13 September 2012, FXI started to ship to those that pre-ordered devices. At the time of writing (November 2013), the Cotton Candy is generally available. FXI have also made a Beta android ICS image and Beta Linux image available for download.

On 16 of July 2014, FXI declared bankruptcy.

== Reception ==
In January 2012 the Cotton Candy made it to the top-10 finalist at the "Last Gadget Standing" new technology competition at CES 2012. Also at CES 2012, LaptopMag.com made Cotton Candy a top-10 finalist for its "Readers’ Choice for Best of CES 2012" award. EFYTimes News Network as well named FXI Technologies Cotton Candy a "Top 10 Gadgets Launched @ CES 2012".

== See also ==
- Exynos, system-on-a-chip by Samsung used in Cotton Candy
