= Samsung Galaxy J2 (2018) =

Android smartphone by Samsung

- Manufacturer: Samsung Electronics
- Type: Smartphone
- Series: Galaxy J series
- First released: January 2018
- Discontinued: April 4, 2019
- Predecessor: Samsung Galaxy J2 (2016); Samsung Galaxy J2 Prime
- Successor: Samsung Galaxy J2 Core
- Related: Samsung Galaxy J3 (2018); Samsung Galaxy J7 (2018)
- Compatible networks: 2G GSM 850, 900, 1800, 1900; 3G HSDPA 850, 900, 2100; 4G LTE Bands 1, 3, 5, 7, 8, 20, 38, 40
- Form factor: Slate
- Dimensions: 143.8 mm (5.66 in) H 72.3 mm (2.85 in) W 8.4 mm (0.33 in) D
- Weight: 153 g (5.4 oz)
- Operating system: Android 7.1.1 Nougat (32-bit)
- System-on-chip: Qualcomm Snapdragon 425
- CPU: Quad-core (4×1.4 GHz) ARM Cortex-A53 (64-bit)
- GPU: Adreno 308
- Memory: 1.5 or 2 GB
- Storage: 16 GB or 32 GB
- Removable storage: microSD up to 256 GB
- Battery: 2600 mAh
- Rear camera: 8 MP, f/2.2, HDR
- Front camera: 5 MP, f/2.2
- Display: 5.0", 540×960 px (220 ppi) Super AMOLED
- Connectivity: WLAN 802.11 b/g/n, Bluetooth 4.2, GPS/GLONASS, microUSB 2.0, 3.5 mm headphone jack
- Data inputs: Accelerometer, proximity sensor
- Model: SM-J250x (x varies by region and carrier)
- Other: FM radio, Dual SIM (Duos models only)

The Samsung Galaxy J2 (2018) (also known as Galaxy J2 Pro (2018) or Galaxy Grand Prime Pro) is an Android smartphone manufactured by Samsung Electronics. It was unveiled and released in January 2018.

== Specifications ==
=== Hardware ===
The Galaxy J2 is powered by a Snapdragon 425 SoC including a quad-core 1.4 GHz ARM Cortex-A53 CPU, an Adreno 308 GPU with either 1.5 (Pro) or 2 GB RAM. The 16 GB internal storage can be upgraded up to 256 GB via microSD card.

It has a 5.0-inch Super AMOLED display with a 540×960 px resolution. The J2 (2018) features an 8 megapixels with f/2.2 aperture, LED flash, autofocus and HDR; the front camera has 5 MP with f/2.2 aperture.

=== Software ===
The Galaxy J2 is shipped with Android 7.1.1 "Nougat".

== See also ==
- Samsung Galaxy
- Samsung Galaxy J series

| Preceded by Samsung Galaxy J2 Prime | Samsung Galaxy J2 (2018); 2018 | Succeeded by Samsung Galaxy J2 Core |
