= Samsung Galaxy J6+ =

Android smartphone, 2018–2019

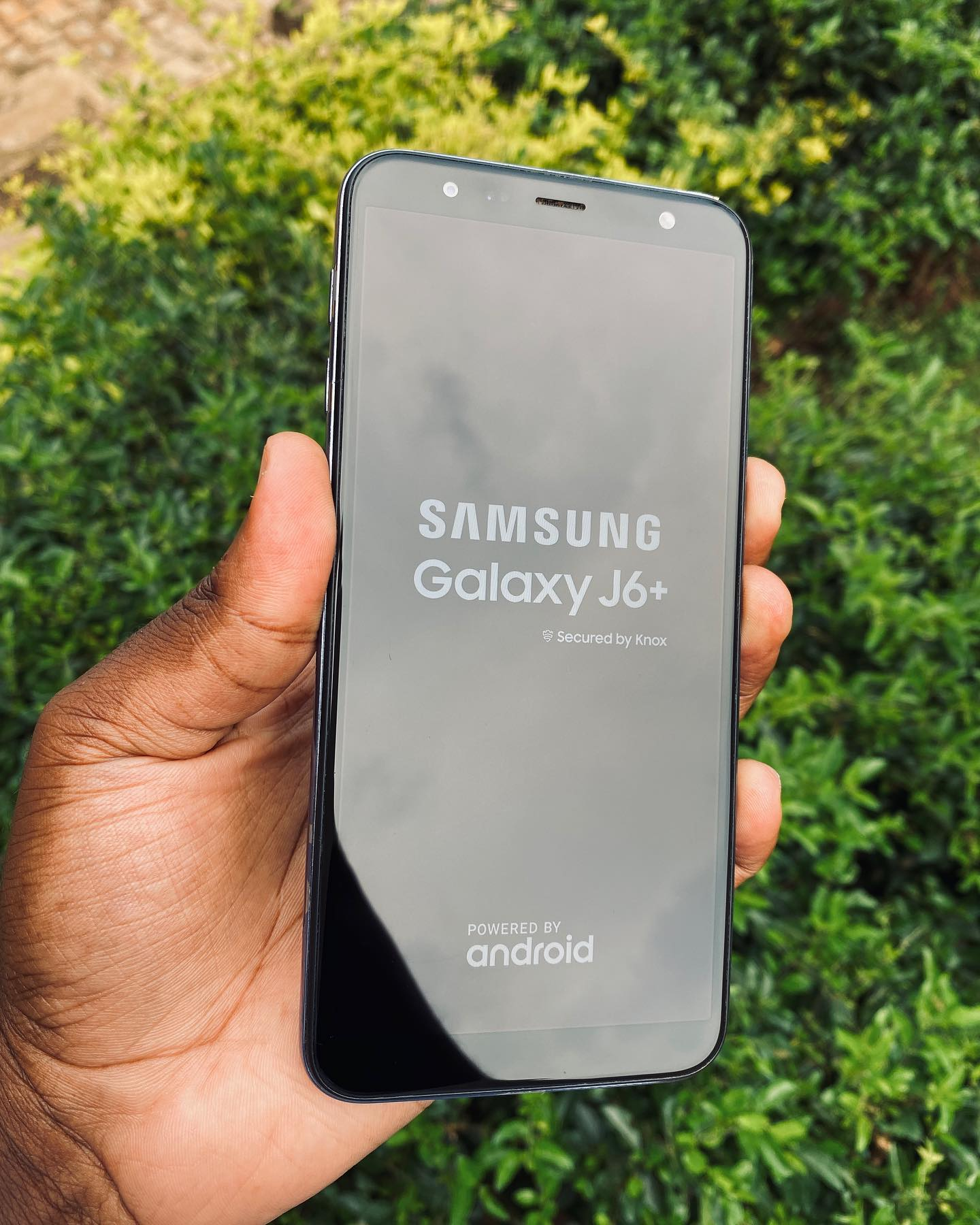
- Brand: Samsung
- Manufacturer: Samsung Electronics
- Type: Smartphone
- Series: Galaxy J series
- First released: October 2018; 8 years ago
- Discontinued: April 2019
- Related: Galaxy J4+, Galaxy J6, Galaxy J4 Core, Galaxy J8
- Compatible networks: 2G GSM 850, 900, 1800, 1900; 3G HSDPA 850, 900, 1700, 1900, 2100; 4G LTE Bands 1, 2, 3, 4, 5, 7, 8, 12, 13, 17, 20, 28, 38, 40, 41, 66
- Form factor: Slate
- Color: Red or Blue
- Dimensions: 161.4 mm (6.35 in) H 76.9 mm (3.03 in) W 7.9 mm (0.31 in) D
- Weight: 178 g (6.3 oz)
- Operating system: Original: Android 8.1 "Oreo"; Samsung Experience; Current: Android 10; One UI 2.0
- System-on-chip: Qualcomm MSM8917 Snapdragon 425
- GPU: Adreno 308
- Memory: 3 or 4 GB
- Storage: 32 or 64 GB
- Removable storage: microSD up to 256 GB
- Rear camera: 13 MP, f/1.7; 5 MP, f/1.9
- Front camera: 8 MP, f/.1.9
- Display: 6.0", 720×1480 px (274 ppi) TFT LCD
- Connectivity: WLAN 802.11b/g/n, Bluetooth 4.2, GPS/GLONASS, NFC, microUSB 2.0, 3.5 mm headphone jack
- Data inputs: Accelerometer, proximity sensor, gyroscope, compass, fingerprint sensor
- Other: FM radio

Samsung Galaxy J6+ is a mid range Android smartphone produced by Samsung Electronics in 2018.

== Specifications ==
=== Hardware ===
The Galaxy J6+ is powered by Qualcomm MSM8917 Snapdragon 425 (28 nm) SoC including a quad-core 1.4 GHz Cortex-A53 CPU, an Adreno 308 GPU with 3 or 4 GB RAM and 32 or 64 GB of internal storage which can be upgraded up to 256 GB via microSD card.

The Galaxy J6+ display is larger than other phones in the same series launched in 2018. It has a 6.0-inch TFT LCD with HD Ready resolution, ~73.6% screen-to-body ratio, 720x1480 pixels, 18.5:9 ratio and ~274 ppi density. At the above of screen, there is a front-facing camera with 8MP (F1.9) resolution. On the top center of the rear panel, there is a dual rear camera setup with 13 MP (f/1.7) + 5 MP (f/1.9) sensors with live focus, portrait mode and background blur options. At the device, there is a fingerprint reader integrated to the power button. The phone has a 3300 mAh Li-Ion non-removable battery.

=== Software ===
The Galaxy J6+ is shipped with Android 8.1 "Oreo" and Samsung's Samsung Experience user interface. In January 2019, an update to 9.0 "Pie" and One UI was made available. in 2020, Android 10 was made available.

== See also ==
- Samsung Galaxy
- Samsung Galaxy J series
- Samsung Galaxy J4+
- Samsung Galaxy J8
