= Samsung Galaxy J4 Core =

2018 smartphone by Samsung Electronics

- Manufacturer: Samsung Electronics
- Type: Smartphone
- Series: Galaxy J series
- First released: November 12, 2018; 7 years ago
- Discontinued: April 2020
- Related: Galaxy J2 Core; Galaxy J4+ Galaxy J4
- Compatible networks: 2G GSM 850, 900, 1800, 1900; 3G HSDPA 850, 900, 1700, 1900, 2100; 4G LTE Bands 1, 2, 3, 4, 5, 7, 8, 12, 13, 17, 20, 28, 38, 40, 41, 66
- Form factor: Slate
- Dimensions: 160.6 mm (6.32 in) H 76.1 mm (3.00 in) W 7.9 mm (0.31 in) D
- Weight: 177 g (6.2 oz)
- Operating system: Android 8.1 "Oreo" Go; Samsung Experience
- System-on-chip: Qualcomm Snapdragon 425
- CPU: Quad-core (4×1.4 GHz) ARM Cortex-A53
- GPU: Adreno 308
- Memory: 1 GB
- Storage: 16 GB
- Removable storage: microSD up to 512 GB
- Battery: 3300 mAh
- Rear camera: 8 MP, f/2.2
- Front camera: 5 MP, f/.2.2
- Display: 6.0", 720×1480 px (274 ppi) TFT LCD
- Connectivity: WLAN 802.11b/g/n, Bluetooth 4.2, GPS/GLONASS, microUSB 2.0, 3.5 mm headphone jack
- Data inputs: Accelerometer, proximity sensor
- Model: SM-J410D; SM-J410F; SM-J410G
- Other: FM radio, Dual SIM
- Website: Galaxy J4 Core

Samsung Galaxy J4 Core is an Android smartphone manufactured by Samsung Electronics and was released in October 2018. It is the second Android Go-based smartphone manufactured by Samsung after the J2 Core.

== Specifications ==
=== Hardware ===
The Galaxy J4 Core is powered by an Snapdragon 425 SoC including a quad-core 1.4 GHz ARM Cortex-A53 CPU, an Adreno 308 GPU with 1 GB RAM and 16 GB of internal storage which can be upgraded up to 512 GB via microSD card.

It has a 6.0-inch IPS LCD with HD ready resolution. The 8 MP rear camera has f/2.2 aperture and features autofocus, LED flash and Full HD video. The front camera has 5 MP with f/2.2 aperture and features LED flash.

=== Software ===
The Galaxy J4 Core is shipped with Android 8.1 "Oreo" and Samsung's Experience user interface. The device uses a special version of Android which is named as Go edition and developed smartphones.

== See also ==
- Samsung Galaxy
- Samsung Galaxy J series
- Samsung Galaxy J2 Core
- Samsung Galaxy J3 (2018)
- Samsung Galaxy J6
- Samsung Galaxy J4+
- Samsung Galaxy J6+
