= Exynos =

Family of ARM based system-on-a-chips made by Samsung

Logo

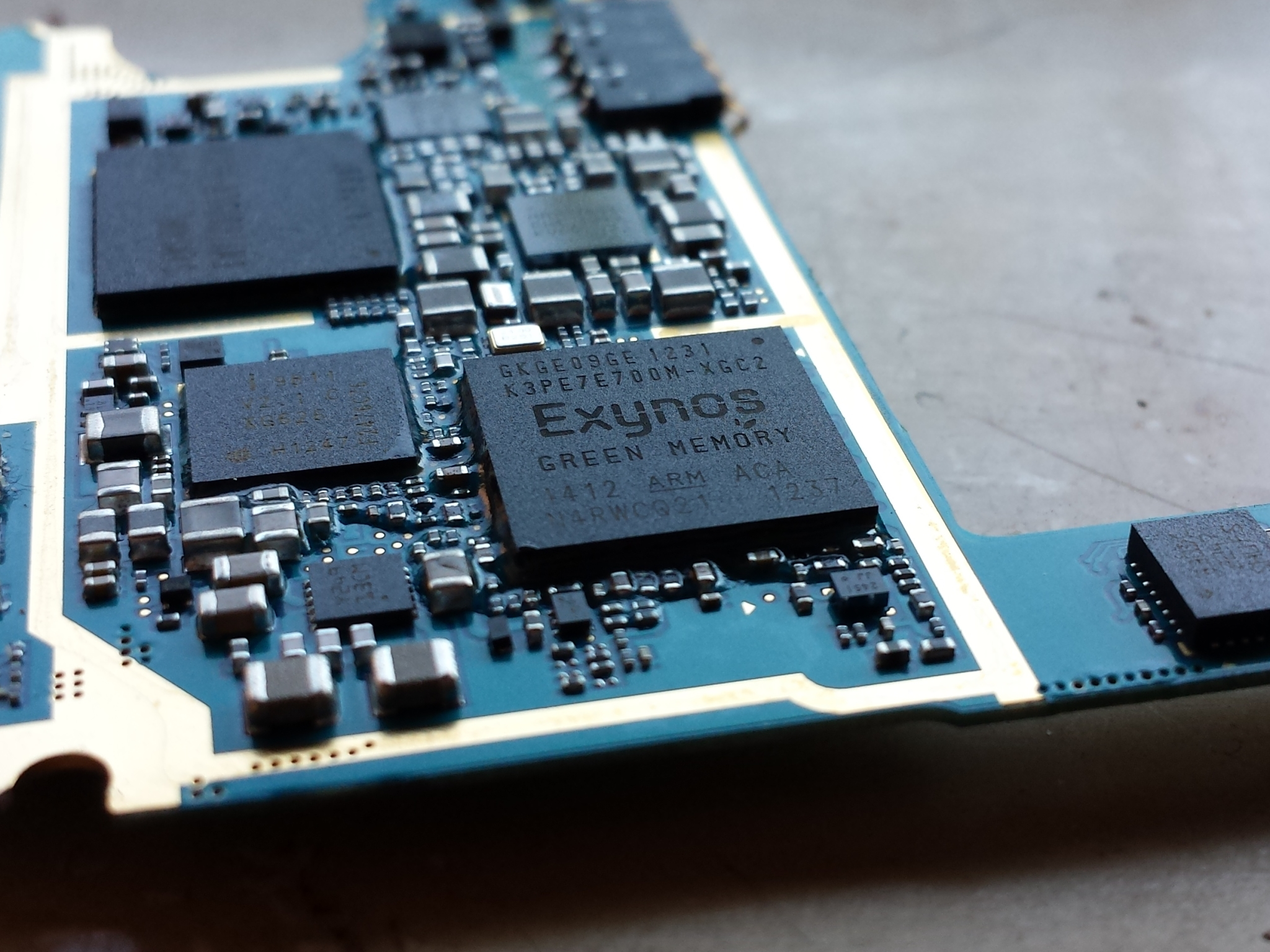
An Exynos 4 Quad (4412), on the circuit board of a Samsung Galaxy S III smartphone

The Samsung Exynos (stylized as SΛMSUNG Exynos), formerly Hummingbird (Korean: 엑시노스), is a series of Arm-based system-on-chips developed by Samsung Electronics' System LSI division and manufactured by Samsung Foundry. It is a continuation of Samsung's earlier S3C, S5L and S5P line of SoCs.

The debut of Samsung's indigenously developed SoC is Samsung Hummingbird (S5PC110/111), later renamed as Exynos 3 Single 3110. Samsung announced it on July 27, 2009. In 2011, Samsung announced Exynos 4 Dual 4210 that was later equipped on Samsung Galaxy S II. Since then, Samsung has used Exynos as a representative brand name of their SoC, based on Arm Cortex cores. In 2017, Samsung launched their proprietary Arm ISA-based customized core designs, codenamed "Exynos M". Exynos M series core made a debut with Exynos M1 nicknamed "Mongoose", which was used for Exynos 8 Octa 8890. The Exynos M-series have been implemented throughout the flagship lineup of Samsung Exynos 9 series, until Exynos 990. From 2021 onwards, Exynos M6 and M7 microarchitecture developments have been cancelled and instead Samsung adopts Arm Cortex-X core series as the primary core.

In 2022, Samsung started adoption of AMD RDNA GPU microarchitecture into their SoC, beginning on Exynos 2200 with Xclipse 920, which used customized "mobile RDNA" based on RDNA 2. In 2024, Samsung expanded AMD RDNA 3-based GPU into their midrange chips, since Exynos 1480 (Xclipse 530).

== History ==
=== 2010–2016: Pre-Mongoose Era ===
In 2010, Samsung launched the Hummingbird S5PC110 (now Exynos 3 Single) in its Samsung Galaxy S smartphone, which featured a licensed Arm Cortex-A8 CPU. This Arm Cortex-A8 was code-named Hummingbird. It was developed in partnership with Intrinsity using their FastCore and Fast14 technology.

In early 2011, Samsung first launched the Exynos 4210 SoC in its Samsung Galaxy S II mobile smartphone. The driver code for the Exynos 4210 was made available in the Linux kernel and support was added in version 3.2 in November 2011.

On 29 September 2011, Samsung introduced Exynos 4212 as a successor to the 4210; it features a higher clock frequency and "50 percent higher 3D graphics performance over the previous processor generation". Built with a 32 nm high-κ metal gate (HKMG) low-power process; it promises a "30 percent lower power-level over the previous process generation".

On 30 November 2011, Samsung released information about their upcoming SoC with a dual-core ARM Cortex-A15 CPU, which was initially named "Exynos 5250" and was later renamed to Exynos 5 Dual. This SoC has a memory interface providing 12.8 GB/s of memory bandwidth, support for USB 3.0 and SATA 3, can decode full 1080p video at 60 fps along with simultaneously displaying WQXGA-resolution (2560 × 1600) on a mobile display as well as 1080p over HDMI. This SoC was used in some Chromebooks from 2013. Samsung Exynos 5 Dual has been used in a 2015 prototype supercomputer, while the end-product will use a chip meant for servers from another vendor.

On 26 April 2012, Samsung released the Exynos 4 Quad, which powers the Samsung Galaxy S III and Samsung Galaxy Note II. The Exynos 4 Quad SoC uses 20% less power than the SoC in Samsung Galaxy S II. Samsung also changed the name of several SoCs, Exynos 3110 to Exynos 3 Single, Exynos 4210 and 4212 to Exynos 4 Dual 45 nm, and Exynos 4 Dual 32 nm and Exynos 5250 to Exynos 5 Dual.

In 2010 Samsung founded a design center in Austin called Samsung's Austin R&D Center (SARC). Samsung has hired many ex-AMD, ex-Intel, ex-ARM and various other industry veterans. The SARC developed high-performance, low-power, complex CPU and System IP (Coherent Interconnect and memory controller) architectures and designs. In 2012, Samsung began development of GPU IP called "S-GPU".

=== 2016–2020: Mongoose Era ===
After a three-year design cycle, SARC's first custom CPU core called the M1 was released in the Exynos 8890 in 2016. In 2017 the San Jose Advanced Computing Lab (ACL) was opened to continue custom GPU IP development. In the same year, Samsung announced Exynos M2, a minor revision of Exynos M1.

In Hot Chips 2018, Samsung announced a new custom core named Exynos M3, codenamed Meerkat. M3 has widened decoder width from 4-wide to 6-wide, and introduced L3 cache structure. Also, it achieved over 50% IPC increase versus Exynos M1 and M2. SPEC2006 benchmark result showed that it has performance advantage comparing with counterparts of Snapdragon 845 (Cortex-A75) at their respective peak clock speed, and by lowering the clock speed to 1.79 GHz it matched the power efficiency versus Cortex-A75 of Snapdragon 845. However, Samsung Galaxy S9 with Exynos 9810 was criticized in early period of their release due to the poor CPU core scheduler settings.

In 2019, Samsung revealed Exynos 9820 with fourth-generation custom core named Exynos M4 (Cheetah). It has been manufactured on Samsung 8 nm LPP process. Unlike the past flagship Exynos series with 4+4 dual-cluster settings, Exynos 9820 implemented 2+2+4 core cluster configurations. Benchmark result presented that Exynos 9820 had performance parity but worse efficiency over Snapdragon 855. Later, Samsung announced Exynos 9825, a revised SoC manufactured on their first 7 nm manufacturing process named 7LPE. Exynos 9825 came equipped with Samsung Galaxy Note10 series and Samsung Galaxy F62/M62.

In 2020, Samsung released last Mongoose-based SoC, named Exynos 990. Exynos 990 came with their fifth-generation custom core (Exynos M5) codenamed Lion. However, M5 showed less performance and worse power efficiency against Cortex-A77 of Snapdragon 865.

On 1 October 2019, rumors emerged that Samsung had laid off their custom CPU core teams at SARC. On 1 November 2019, Samsung filed a WARN letter with the Texas Workforce Commission, notifying of upcoming layoffs of their SARC CPU team and termination of their custom CPU core development. SARC and ACL will still continue development of custom SoC, AI, and GPU.

=== 2021–present: Cortex and RDNA Era ===
On 3 June 2019, AMD and Samsung announced a multi-year strategic partnership in mobile graphics IP based on AMD Radeon GPU IP. NotebookCheck reported that Samsung are targeting 2021 for their first SoC with AMD Radeon GPU IP. However, AnandTech reported 2022. In August 2019, during AMD's Q2 2019 earnings call, AMD stated that Samsung plans to launch SoCs with AMD graphics IP in roughly two years. The first SoC to use Radeon GPU were Exynos 2200, introduced in January 2022, with a custom Xclipse 920 based on AMD's RDNA 2 microarchitecture.

In June 2021, Samsung hired engineers from AMD and Apple to form a new custom architecture team.

In October 2021, Google released their Pixel 6 series of phones based on Google's Tensor SoC, which was made in collaboration with Samsung.

In 2024, Samsung officially announced Exynos 2400, with RDNA 3 microarchitecture-based Xclipse 940. In the same year, along with Exynos 2400, Samsung released Exynos 1480, with RDNA 3 based Xclipse 530, marking the end of Arm Mali GPU era in their mid-range processors.

== Current Exynos SoCs (2020–present) ==
Starting in 2020 Samsung introduced a new series of Exynos SoCs with lower numbers than in the past. This indicates a cut between the past Exynos SoCs at least in naming.

=== Exynos 800 series ===
SoC			CPU		GPU			Memory technology			NPU	Modem	Connectivity	Released	Devices using
Model number	Fab.	Die size (mm^{2})	ISA	μarch	μarch	Frequency (MHz)	Performance GFLOPS (FP32)	Type	Bus width (bit)	Bandwidth (GB/s)	NPU	Modem	Connectivity	Released	Devices using
Exynos 850 (S5E3830)	8 nm (Samsung 8LPP)		ARMv8.2-A	8 cores 2.0 GHz Cortex-A55	Mali-G52 MP1	1001	32	LPDDR4X	32-bit (2×16-bit) Dual-channel	1866 MHz (14.9 GB/s)	—N/a	List: Shannon 318 LTE Cat.7 2CA 300 Mbit/s (DL) / Cat.13 2CA 150 Mbit/s (UL)	Bluetooth 5.0, Wi-Fi 5	Q2 2020	List: Samsung Galaxy A04s; Samsung Galaxy A12 (SM-A127x); Samsung Galaxy A13 (SM-A135x); Samsung Galaxy A14 (SM-A145F); Samsung Galaxy A21s; Samsung Galaxy M12/F12; Samsung Galaxy M13/F13; Samsung Galaxy Xcover 5
Exynos 880 (S5E8805)	8 nm (Samsung 8LPP)		ARMv8.2-A	2 + 6 cores (2.0 GHz Cortex-A77 + 1.8 GHz Cortex-A55)	Mali-G76 MP5	546	131	LPDDR4X	32-bit (2×16-bit) Dual-channel	2133 MHz (17.1 GB/s)	NPU	List: Shannon 5G LTE DL: Cat.16 1000 Mbit/s, 5CA, 256-QAM UL: Cat.18 200 Mbit/s, 2CA, 256-QAM 5G NR Sub-6 GHz DL: 2.55 Gbit/s UL: 1.28 Gbit/s	Bluetooth 5.0, Wi-Fi 5	Q2 2020	List: Vivo Y51s; Vivo Y70s; Vivo Y70t

=== Exynos 900 series ===
SoC			CPU		GPU			Memory technology			NPU	Modem	Connectivity	Released	Devices using
Model number	Fab.	Die size (mm^{2})	ISA	μarch	μarch	Frequency (MHz)	Performance GFLOPS (FP32)	Type	Bus width (bit)	Bandwidth (GB/s)	NPU	Modem	Connectivity	Released	Devices using
Exynos 980 (S5E9630)	8 nm (Samsung 8LPP)		ARMv8.2-A	2 + 6 cores (2.2 GHz Cortex-A77 + 1.8 GHz Cortex-A55)	Mali-G76 MP5	728	174.7	LPDDR4X	32-bit (2×16-bit) Dual-channel	2133 MHz (17.1 GB/s)	Single core NPU + DSP	List: Shannon 5188 5G LTE DL: Cat.16 1000 Mbit/s, 5CA, 256-QAM UL: Cat.18 200 Mbit/s, 2CA, 256-QAM 5G NR Sub-6 GHz DL: 2.55 Gbit/s UL: 1.28 Gbit/s	Bluetooth 5.0, Wi-Fi 802.11a/b/g/n/ac/ax	Q4 2019	List: Vivo X30 Pro; Vivo X30; Vivo S6 5G; Samsung Galaxy A51 5G; Samsung Galaxy A71 5G
Exynos 990 (S5E9830)	7 nm (Samsung 7LPP)	91.83	ARMv8.2-A	2 + 2 + 4 cores (3.02 GHz Exynos M5 "Lion" + 2.6 GHz Cortex-A76 + 2.11 GHz Cortex-A55) 2 MB System Cache	Mali-G77 MP11	832	585.7	LPDDR5	64-bit (4×16-bit) Quad-channel	2750 MHz (44 GB/s)	Dual-core NPU + DSP (15 TOPs)	List: Paired with Exynos Modem 5123 LTE DL: Cat.24 3000 Mbit/s, 8CA, 1024-QAM UL: Cat.22 422 Mbit/s, 2CA, 256-QAM 5G NR Sub-6 GHz DL: 5.1 Gbit/s UL: ?Gbps 5G NR mmWave DL: 7.35 Gbit/s UL: ?Gbps	Bluetooth 5.0, Wi-Fi 802.11a/b/g/n/ac/ax	Q1 2020	List: Samsung Galaxy S20; Samsung Galaxy S20+; Samsung Galaxy S20 Ultra; Samsung Galaxy Note 20; Samsung Galaxy Note 20 Ultra

=== Exynos 1000 series ===
SoC			CPU		GPU			Memory technology			NPU	Modem	Connectivity	Released	Devices using
Model number	Fab.	Die size (mm^{2})	ISA	μarch	μarch	Frequency (MHz)	Performance GFLOPS (FP32)	Type	Bus width (bit)	Bandwidth (GB/s)	NPU	Modem	Connectivity	Released	Devices using
Exynos 1080 (S5E9815)	5 nm (Samsung 5LPE)	95.5	ARMv8.2-A	1 + 3 + 4 cores (2.8 GHz Cortex-A78 + 2.6 GHz Cortex-A78 + 2.0 GHz Cortex-A55)	Mali-G78 MP10	800	512	LPDDR4X; LPDDR5	64-bit (4×16-bit) Quad-channel	2133 MHz (34.1 GB/s) 2750 MHz (44 GB/s)	NPU + DSP (5.7 TOPs)	List: Shannon 5G LTE DL: Cat.18 1200 Mbit/s, 6CA, 256-QAM UL: Cat.18 200 Mbit/s, 2CA, 256-QAM 5G NR Sub-6 GHz DL: 5.1 Gbit/s UL: 1.28 Gbit/s 5G NR mmWave DL: 3.67 Gbit/s UL: 3.67 Gbit/s	Bluetooth 5.2, Wi-Fi 802.11a/b/g/n/ac/ax	Q4 2020	List: Vivo S15e; Vivo S16e; Vivo X60 (China-only model); Vivo X60 Pro (China-only model); Vivo X60 Edge; Vivo X70t; Vivo X70 Pro (China)
Exynos 1280 (S5E8825)	5 nm (Samsung 5LPE)		ARMv8.2-A	2 + 6 cores (2.4 GHz Cortex-A78 + 2.0 GHz Cortex-A55)	Mali-G68 MP4	897	229.6	LPDDR4X	32-bit (2×16-bit) Dual-channel	2133 MHz (17.1 GB/s)	Single-core NPU 1196 MHz (4.3 TOPs)	List: Shannon 5308 5G LTE DL: Cat.18 1.2 Gbit/s, 6CA, 256-QAM UL: Cat.18 200 Mbit/s, 2CA, 256-QAM 5G NR Sub-6 GHz DL: 2.55 Gbit/s UL: 1.28 Gbit/s 5G NR mmWave DL: 1.84 Gbit/s UL: 0.92 Gbit/s	Bluetooth 5.2, Wi-Fi 5, GNSS	Q1 2022	List: Samsung Galaxy A33 5G; Samsung Galaxy A53 5G; Samsung Galaxy A25 5G; Samsung Galaxy A26 5G (SM-A266M); Samsung Galaxy M33 5G; Samsung Galaxy M34 5G/F34 5G; Samsung Galaxy Tab S6 Lite (2024)
Exynos 1330 (S5E8535)	5 nm (Samsung 5LPE)		ARMv8.2-A	2 + 6 cores (2.4 GHz Cortex-A78 + 2.0 GHz Cortex-A55)	Mali-G68 MP2	949	121.5	LPDDR4X; LPDDR5	32-bit (2×16-bit) Dual-channel	2133 MHz (17.1 GB/s) 3200 MHz (25.6 GB/s)	Unknown	List: Shannon 5308 5G NR Sub-6 GHz 2.55 Gbps (DL) / 1.28 Gbps (UL) LTE Cat.18 6CC (DL) / Cat.18 2CC (UL)	Bluetooth 5.2, Wi-Fi 5, GNSS	Q1 2023	List: Samsung Galaxy A14 5G; Samsung Galaxy M14 5G; Samsung Galaxy F14 5G; Samsung Galaxy A17 5G
Exynos 1380 (S5E8835)	5 nm (Samsung 5LPE)	53.3	ARMv8.2-A	4 + 4 cores (2.4 GHz Cortex-A78 + 2.0 GHz Cortex-A55)	Mali-G68 MP5	949	303.7	LPDDR4X; LPDDR5	32-bit (2×16-bit) Dual-channel	2133 MHz (17.1 GB/s) 3200 MHz (25.6 GB/s)	Single-core NPU 1196 MHz (4.9 TOPs)	List: Shannon 5318 5G NR Sub-6 GHz 3.79 Gbps (DL) / 1.28 Gbps (UL) 5G NR mmWave 3.67 Gbps (DL) / 0.92 Gbps (UL) LTE Cat.18 1.2 Gbps (DL) / Cat.18 211 Mbps (UL)	Bluetooth 5.3, Wi-Fi 6, GNSS	Q1 2023	List: Samsung Galaxy A35 5G; Samsung Galaxy A54 5G; Samsung Galaxy M54 5G/F54 5G; Samsung Galaxy Tab S9 FE; Samsung Galaxy Tab S9 FE+; Samsung Galaxy M35 5G; Samsung Galaxy M36 5G; Samsung Galaxy A26 5G (SM-A266B/E/U/U1)
Exynos 1480 (S5E8845)	4 nm (Samsung 4LPP)		ARMv8.2-A	4 + 4 cores (2.75 GHz Cortex-A78 + 2.0 GHz Cortex-A55)	Xclipse 530 "Titan" (RDNA 2 based 128:8:8:2; 1 WGP) (Note: Unified Shaders : Texture Mapping Units : Render Output Units : Ray Accelerators and Workgroup Processor (WGP))	1300	332.8	LPDDR4X; LPDDR5	32-bit (2×16-bit) Dual-channel	2133 MHz (17.1 GB/s) 3200 MHz (25.6 GB/s)	6K MAC, Single-core NPU 1066 MHz (13.1 TOPs)	List: Shannon 5328 5G NR Sub-6 GHz 5.10 Gbps (DL) / 1.28 Gbps (UL) 5G NR mmWave 4.84 Gbps (DL) / 0.92 Gbps (UL) LTE Cat.18 1.2 Gbps (DL) / Cat.18 211 Mbps (UL)	Bluetooth 5.3, Wi-Fi 6E, GNSS	Q1 2024	List: Samsung Galaxy A37 5G; Samsung Galaxy A55 5G; Samsung Galaxy M56 5G
Exynos 1580 (S5E8855)	4 nm (Samsung 4LPP+)	56	ARMv9.2-A	1 + 3 + 4 cores (2.9 GHz Cortex-A720 + 2.6 GHz Cortex-A720 + 1.95 GHz Cortex-A520)	Xclipse 540 "Ariel" (RDNA 3 based 256:16:8:4; 2 WGP)	1300	1,331.2	LPDDR5	32-bit (2×16-bit) Dual-channel	3200 MHz (25.6 GB/s)	6K MAC, Single-core NPU 1066 MHz (14.7 TOPs)	List: Shannon 5328 5G NR Sub-6GHz 5.1 Gbps (DL), 1.28 Gbps (UL) / 5G NR mmWave 4.84 Gbps (DL), 0.92 Gbps (UL) / LTE Cat.18 6CC 1.2 Gbps (DL), Cat.18 2CC 211 Mbps (UL)	Bluetooth 5.4, Wi-Fi 6E, GNSS	Q4 2024	List: Samsung Galaxy A56 5G; Samsung Galaxy Tab S10 FE; Samsung Galaxy Tab S10 FE+
Exynos 1680 (S5E8865)	4 nm (Samsung 4LPP+)		ARMv9.2-A	1 + 4 + 3 cores (2.9 GHz Cortex-A720 + 2.6 GHz Cortex-A720 + 1.95 GHz Cortex-A520)	Xclipse 550 "Triton" (RDNA 3 based 256:16:16:4; 2 WGP)	1200	1,228.8	LPDDR5X	32-bit (2×16-bit) Dual-channel	Unknown	8K MAC, Single-core NPU 1200 MHz (19.6 TOPs)	List: 5G NR Sub-6GHz 5.1 Gbps (DL), 1.28 Gbps (UL) / 5G NR mmWave 4.84 Gbps (DL), 0.92 Gbps (UL) / LTE Cat.18 6CC 1.2 Gbps (DL), Cat.18 2CC 211 Mbps (UL)	Bluetooth 6.1, Wi-Fi 6E, GNSS	Q1 2026	List: Samsung Galaxy A57 5G

=== Exynos 2000 series ===
SoC			CPU		GPU			Memory technology			NPU	Modem	Connectivity	Released	Devices using
Model number	Fab.	Die size (mm^{2})	ISA	μarch	μarch	Frequency (MHz)	Performance GFLOPS (FP32)	Type	Bus width (bit)	Bandwidth (GB/s)	NPU	Modem	Connectivity	Released	Devices using
Exynos 2100 (S5E9840)	5 nm (Samsung 5LPE)	128.1	ARMv8.2-A	1 + 3 + 4 cores (2.91 GHz Cortex-X1 + 2.81 GHz Cortex-A78 + 2.2 GHz Cortex-A55)	Mali-G78 MP14	854	765.2	LPDDR5	64-bit (4×16-bit) Quad-channel	3200 MHz (51.2 GB/s)	6K MAC; Triple NPU + DSP; 1352 MHz (26 TOPs)	List: Exynos Modem 5123 LTE DL: Cat.24 3000 Mbit/s, 8CA, 1024-QAM UL: Cat.18 422 Mbit/s, 4CA, 256-QAM 5G NR Sub-6 GHz DL: 5.1 Gbit/s UL: 1.92 Gbit/s 5G NR mmWave DL: 7.35 Gbit/s UL: 3.67 Gbit/s	Bluetooth 5.0, Wi-Fi 6	Q1 2021	List: Samsung Galaxy S21; Samsung Galaxy S21+; Samsung Galaxy S21 Ultra; Samsung Galaxy S21 FE
Exynos 2200 (S5E9925)	4 nm (Samsung 4LPE)	104.7	ARMv9.0-A	1 + 3 + 4 cores (2.95 GHz Cortex-X2 + 2.70 GHz Cortex-A710 + 2.10 GHz Cortex-A510)	Xclipse 920 "Voyager" (RDNA 2 based 384:24:24:6; 3 WGP)	1306	1,003	LPDDR5	64-bit (4×16-bit) Quad-channel	3200 MHz (51.2 GB/s)	8K MAC; Dual NPU + DSP; 1066 MHz	List: Shannon 5133 LTE DL: Cat.24 3000 Mbit/s, 8CA, 1024-QAM UL: Cat.22 422 Mbit/s, 4CA, 256-QAM 5G NR Sub-6 GHz DL: 5.1 Gbit/s UL: 2.55 Gbit/s 5G NR mmWave DL: 7.35 Gbit/s UL: 3.67 Gbit/s	Bluetooth 5.2, Wi-Fi 6E	Q1 2022	List: Samsung Galaxy S22; Samsung Galaxy S22+; Samsung Galaxy S22 Ultra; Samsung Galaxy S23 FE
Exynos 2400/2400e (S5E9945)	4 nm (Samsung 4LPP+)	137.4	ARMv9.2-A	1 + 2 + 3 + 4 cores (3.1/3.2 GHz Cortex-X4 + 2.9 GHz Cortex-A720 + 2.6 GHz Cortex-A720 + 1.95 GHz Cortex-A520)	Xclipse 940 "Magellan" (RDNA 3 based 768:48:32:12; 6 WGP)	1095	3,406.8	LPDDR5X	64-bit (4×16-bit) Quad-channel	4266 MHz (68.2 GB/s)	17K MAC NPU (2x GNPU + 2x SNPU) + DSP; 1300 MHz	List: Shannon 5153 LTE DL: Cat.24 3000 Mbit/s, 8CA, 1024-QAM UL: Cat.22 422 Mbit/s, 4CA, 256-QAM 5G NR Sub-6 GHz DL: 9.64 Gbit/s UL: 2.55 Gbit/s 5G NR mmWave DL: 12.1 Gbit/s UL: 3.67 Gbit/s	Bluetooth 5.3, Wi-Fi 6E	Q1 2024	List: Samsung Galaxy S24; Samsung Galaxy S24+; Samsung Galaxy S24 FE; Samsung Galaxy S25 FE; Samsung Galaxy Z Flip7 FE
Exynos 2500 (S5E9955)	3 nm (Samsung 3GAP)	141.6	ARMv9.2-A	1 + 2 + 5 + 2 cores (3.3 GHz Cortex-X925 + 2.74 GHz Cortex-A725 + 2.36 GHz Cortex-A725 + 1.8 GHz Cortex-A520)	Xclipse 950 "Galileo" (RDNA 3 based 1024:64:64:16; 8 WGP)	999	4,091.9	LPDDR5X	64-bit (4×16-bit) Quad-channel	4800 MHz (76.8 GB/s)	24K MAC NPU (2x GNPU + 2x SNPU) + DSP (59 TOPs)	List: Shannon 5163 LTE DL: Cat.24 3000 Mbit/s, 8CA, 1024-QAM UL: Cat.22 422 Mbit/s, 4CA, 256-QAM 5G NR Sub-6 GHz DL: 9.64 Gbit/s UL: 2.55 Gbit/s 5G NR mmWave DL: 12.1 Gbit/s UL: 3.67 Gbit/s	Bluetooth 5.4, Wi-Fi 7	Q2 2025	List: Samsung Galaxy Z Flip7; Samsung Galaxy S26 FE
Exynos 2600 (S5E9965)	2 nm (Samsung SF2)	141.5	ARMv9.3-A	1 + 3 + 6 cores (3.8 GHz C1-Ultra + 3.25 GHz C1-Pro + 2.75 GHz C1-Pro)	Xclipse 960 "Juno" (RDNA 4 based 1024:64:64:16; 8 WGP)	980	7,024.6	LPDDR5X	64-bit (4×16-bit) Quad-channel	5333 MHz (85.3 GB/s)	32K MAC Dual NPU + DSP; 1200 MHz	—N/a	Bluetooth 6.0, Wi-Fi 7	Q1 2026	List: Samsung Galaxy S26; Samsung Galaxy S26+; Samsung Galaxy Z Flip 8

== Past Exynos SoCs (2010–2019) ==
SoC			CPU		GPU			Memory technology			NPU	Modem	Connectivity	Released	Devices using
Model number	Fab.	Die size (mm^{2})	ISA	μarch	μarch	Frequency (MHz)	Performance (GFLOPS)	Type	Bus width (bit)	Bandwidth (GB/s)	NPU	Modem	Connectivity	Released	Devices using
Exynos 3 Single 3110 (previously Hummingbird S5PC110)	45 nm (Samsung 45 nm HKMG)		ARMv7	1 core 1.2 GHz Cortex-A8	PowerVR SGX540	200	3.2	LPDDR, LPDDR2 or DDR2	64-bit (2×32-bit) Dual-channel	200 MHz (3.2 GB/s)	—N/a			Q2 2010	List: at 1 GHz: Samsung Galaxy S line, Samsung Wave S8500, Samsung Wave II S8530, Samsung Galaxy Tab, Samsung Droid Charge, Samsung Exhibit 4G, Google Nexus S, Meizu M9, Samsung Stratosphere at 1.2 GHz: Samsung Infuse 4G
Exynos 3 Quad 3470	28 nm (Samsung 28 nm HKMG)		ARMv7	4 cores 1.4 GHz Cortex-A7	Mali-400 MP4	450	16.2	LPDDR2 or LPDDR3	64-bit (2×32-bit) Dual-channel	400 MHz (6.4 GB/s) or 533 MHz (8.5 GB/s)	—N/a			Q3 2014	List: Samsung Galaxy S5 Mini LTE, Samsung Galaxy Light, Samsung Galaxy Tab 4 7.0 LTE
Exynos 3 Quad 3475	28 nm (Samsung 28 nm HKMG)		ARMv7	4 cores 1.3 GHz Cortex-A7	Mali-T720	600	12	LPDDR3	64-bit (2×32-bit) Dual-channel	533 MHz (8.5 GB/s)	—N/a			Q3 2015	List: Samsung Galaxy Amp Prime (J320AZ); Samsung Galaxy Express Prime (J320A); Samsung Galaxy Folder; Samsung Galaxy J1 (2016) (LTE models only); Samsung Galaxy J2 (2015); Samsung Galaxy J2 (2017); Samsung Galaxy J3 (2016) (J3109, J320P, J320R4, J320W8); Samsung Galaxy J3 V (2016) (J320V); Samsung Galaxy On5; Samsung Galaxy On5 Pro (2016); Samsung Galaxy XCover 3 VE (G389F)
Exynos 4 Dual 4210	45 nm (Samsung 45 nm HKMG)		ARMv7	2 cores 1.2 GHz Cortex-A9	Mali-400 MP4	266	9.6	LPDDR2, DDR2 or DDR3	64-bit (2×32-bit) Dual-channel	400 MHz (6.4 GB/s)	—N/a			Q2 2011	List: at 1.2 GHz: Samsung Galaxy S II, Samsung Galaxy Tab 7.0 Plus at 1.4 GHz: Samsung Galaxy Note, Samsung Galaxy Tab 7.7, Hardkernel ODROID-A, Meizu MX 2-Core (first 2-core model), Cotton Candy by FXI Tech, ORIGEN 4 Dual
Exynos 4 Dual 4212	32 nm (Samsung 32 nm HKMG)		ARMv7	2 cores 1.5 GHz Cortex-A9	Mali-400 MP4	400	14.4	LPDDR2, DDR2 or DDR3	64-bit (2×32-bit) Dual-channel	400 MHz (6.4 GB/s)	—N/a			Q1 2012	List: Meizu MX 2-Core (new 2-core model), Samsung Galaxy Tab 3 8.0, Samsung Galaxy S4 zoom
Exynos 4 Quad 4412	32 nm (Samsung 32 nm HKMG)		ARMv7	4 cores 1.6 GHz Cortex-A9	Mali-400 MP4	400–533	14.4–19.2	LPDDR2, DDR2 or DDR3	64-bit (2×32-bit) Dual-channel	400 MHz (6.4 GB/s)	—N/a			Q2 2012	List: Samsung Galaxy Note 10.1, Samsung Galaxy S III, Samsung Galaxy Note II, Auxus Core X4 3G AndroidAgent Boardcon EM4412 SBC, Hardkernel ODROID-U2, ODROID-X2, ODROID-U3, ODROID-Q2, Samsung Galaxy Camera 2, Lenovo K860, Newman N2, Ramos W30HD, Meizu MX 4-Core, Hardkernel ODROID-X, ODROID-U, ODROID-Q, ORIGEN 4 Quad, Hyundai T7 Tablet, Samsung Galaxy Pop, Samsung Galaxy Light, Lenovo P700i
Exynos 4 Quad 4415	28 nm (Samsung 28 nm HKMG)		ARMv7	4 cores 1.5 GHz Cortex-A9	Mali-400 MP4	533	19.2	LPDDR2, DDR2 or DDR3	64-bit (2×32-bit) Dual-channel	400 MHz (6.4 GB/s)	—N/a			Q3 2014	List: Samsung Galaxy Mega 2
Exynos 5 Dual 5250	32 nm (Samsung 32 nm HKMG)		ARMv7	2 cores 1.7 GHz Cortex-A15	Mali-T604 MP4	533	72.5	LPDDR2, LPDDR3 or DDR3	64-bit (2×32-bit) Dual-channel	533 MHz (8.5 GB/s) or 800 MHz (12.8 GB/s)	—N/a			Q3 2012	List: Samsung Chromebook XE303C12, Google Nexus 10, Arndale Board, Huins ACHRO 5250 Exynos, Freelander PD800 HD, Voyo A15, HP Chromebook 11, Samsung Homesync
Exynos 5 Hexa 5260	28 nm (Samsung 28 nm HKMG)		ARMv7	2+4 cores (1.7 GHz Cortex-A15 + 1.3 GHz Cortex-A7)	Mali-T624 MP4	600	81.6	LPDDR3	64-bit (2×32-bit) Dual-channel	800 MHz (12.8 GB/s)	—N/a			Q2 2014	List: Ramos S97, Samsung Galaxy Note 3 Neo, Samsung Galaxy K zoom, Rexnos Rex-Red
Exynos 5 Octa 5410	28 nm (Samsung 28 nm HKMG)		ARMv7	4+4 cores (1.6 GHz Cortex-A15 + 1.2 GHz Cortex-A7)	PowerVR SGX544 MP3	480–532	49	LPDDR3	64-bit (2×32-bit) Dual-channel	800 MHz (12.8 GB/s)	—N/a			Q2 2013	List: Samsung Galaxy S4 I9500, Hardkernel ODROID-XU, Meizu MX3, ZTE Grand S II TD, iBerry CoreX8 3G
Exynos 5 Octa 5420	28 nm (Samsung 28 nm HKMG)	136.96	ARMv7	4+4 cores (1.9 GHz Cortex-A15 + 1.3 GHz Cortex-A7)	Mali-T628 MP6	533	108.7	LPDDR3e	64-bit (2×32-bit) Dual-channel	933 MHz (14.9 GB/s)	—N/a			Q3 2013	List: Samsung Chromebook 2 11.6", Samsung Galaxy Note 3, Samsung Galaxy Note 10.1 (2014 Edition), Samsung Galaxy Note Pro 12.2, Samsung Galaxy Tab Pro (12.2 & 10.1), Samsung Galaxy Tab S 8.4, Samsung Galaxy Tab S 10.5, Arndale Octa Board
Exynos 5 Octa 5422	28 nm (Samsung 28 nm HKMG)		ARMv7	4+4 cores (2.1 GHz Cortex-A15 + 1.5 GHz Cortex-A7)	Mali-T628 MP6	533	108.7	LPDDR3e	64-bit (2×32-bit) Dual-channel	933 MHz (14.9 GB/s)	—N/a			Q2 2014	List: Samsung Galaxy S5 (SM-G900H), Odroid XU3/XU3-Lite/XU4, Rexnos Rex-Red
Exynos 5 Octa 5430	20 nm (Samsung 20 nm HKMG)	110.18	ARMv7	4+4 cores (1.8 GHz Cortex-A15 + 1.3 GHz Cortex-A7)	Mali-T628 MP6	600	122.4	LPDDR3e/DDR3	64-bit (2×32-bit) Dual-channel	1066 MHz (17.0 GB/s)	—N/a			Q3 2014	List: Meizu MX4 Pro; Samsung Galaxy Alpha (SM-G850F); Samsung Galaxy A7 (2015); Samsung Galaxy A8 (2015) (A800S, A800F)
Exynos 5 Octa 5800	28 nm (Samsung 28 nm HKMG)		ARMv7	4+4 cores (2.0 GHz Cortex-A15 + 1.3 GHz Cortex-A7)	Mali-T628 MP6	?	?	LPDDR3/DDR3	64-bit (2×32-bit) Dual-channel	933 MHz (14.9 GB/s)	—N/a			Q2 2014	List: Samsung Chromebook 2 13,3"
Exynos 7 Octa 5433	20 nm (Samsung 20 nm HKMG)	113.42	ARMv8-A	4 + 4 cores (1.9 GHz Cortex-A57 + 1.3 GHz Cortex-A53) GTS	Mali-T760 MP6	700	117.6	LPDDR3	64-bit (2×32-bit) Dual-channel	825 MHz (13.2 GB/s)	—N/a	Paired with Samsung M303/Intel XMM 7260 LTE Cat 6 (300Mbit/s) or Ericsson M7450 LTE Cat 4	Bluetooth, Wi-Fi	Q4 2014	List: Samsung Galaxy A8 (2015) VE (A800I, A800J); Samsung Galaxy Note 4 (SM-N910C, SM-N910H, SM-N910U, SM-N910S, SM-N910K, SM-N910L, SM-N916S, SM-N916K, SM-N916L); Samsung Galaxy Note Edge (South Korea version); Samsung Galaxy Tab S2
Exynos 7 Octa 7420	14 nm (Samsung 14LPE)	78.23	ARMv8-A	4 + 4 cores (2.1 GHz Cortex-A57 + 1.5 GHz Cortex-A53) GTS	Mali-T760 MP8	772	172.9	LPDDR4	64-bit (2×32-bit) Dual-channel	1553 MHz (24.88 GB/s)	—N/a	Paired with Shannon 333 LTE Cat 9 (450 Mbit/s)	Bluetooth, Wi-Fi	Q2 2015	List: Meizu Pro 5; Samsung Galaxy A8 (2016); Samsung Galaxy S6; Samsung Galaxy S6 Active; Samsung Galaxy S6 Edge; Samsung Galaxy S6 Edge+; Samsung Galaxy Note 5; Fasetto LINK; MicroVision MV 7420-LCD SBC
Exynos 7 Quad 7570	14 nm (Samsung 14LPC)		ARMv8-A	4 cores 1.4 GHz Cortex-A53	Mali-T720 MP1	830	16.6	LPDDR3	32-bit Single-channel	533 MHz (4.2 GB/sec)	—N/a	LTE Cat.4 2CA 150 Mbit/s (DL) / 50 Mbit/s (UL)	Bluetooth 4.2, Wi-Fi 802.11a/b/g/n	Q3 2016	List: Samsung Galaxy Amp Prime 3 (2018) (J337AZ); Samsung Galaxy Express Prime 2 (2017) (J327A); Samsung Galaxy Express Prime 3 (2018) (J337A); Samsung Galaxy J2 Core (2018); Samsung Galaxy J2 Core (2020); Samsung Galaxy J2 Dash / Shine (2018) (J260A); Samsung Galaxy J3 (2017) (J330); Samsung Galaxy J3 (2018); Samsung Galaxy J3 Pro (2017); Samsung Galaxy J3 Star (2018) (J337T); Samsung Galaxy J4 (2018); Samsung Galaxy J5 Prime; Samsung Galaxy Xcover 4
Exynos 7 Quad 7578	28 nm (Samsung 28 nm HKMG)		ARMv8-A	4 cores 1.5 GHz Cortex-A53	Mali-T720 MP2	668	26.7	LPDDR3	32-bit Single-channel	933 MHz (7.5 GB/sec)	—N/a	LTE Cat.4 2CA 150 Mbit/s (DL) / 50 Mbit/s (UL)	Bluetooth, Wi-Fi	Q2 2015	List: Samsung Galaxy A3 (2016)
Exynos 7 Octa 7580	28 nm (Samsung 28 nm HKMG)		ARMv8-A	8 cores 1.6 GHz Cortex-A53	Mali-T720 MP2	668	26.7	LPDDR3	32-bit Single-channel	933 MHz (7.5 GB/sec)	—N/a	Shannon 315 LTE Cat.6 2CA 300 Mbit/s (DL) / 50 Mbit/s (UL)	Bluetooth, Wi-Fi	Q2 2015	List: Samsung Galaxy A5 (2016); Samsung Galaxy A7 (2016); Samsung Galaxy J7 (2015) (J700F, J700H, J700M, J700T, J700T1); Samsung Galaxy S5 Neo; Samsung Galaxy View
Exynos 7 Octa 7870	14 nm (Samsung 14LPP)		ARMv8-A	8 cores 1.6 GHz Cortex-A53	Mali-T830 MP1	700	22.4	LPDDR3	32-bit Single-channel	933 MHz (7.5 GB/sec)	—N/a	Shannon 315 LTE Cat.6 2CA 300 Mbit/s (DL) / 50 Mbit/s (UL)	Bluetooth, Wi-Fi	Q1 2016	List: Samsung Galaxy A2 Core; Samsung Galaxy A3 (2017); Samsung Galaxy A6 (2018); Samsung Galaxy Feel (SC-04J); Samsung Galaxy Halo (J727AZ); Samsung Galaxy J5 / J5 Pro (2017); Samsung Galaxy J6 (2018); Samsung Galaxy J7 (2016); Samsung Galaxy J7 / J7 Pro (2017); Samsung Galaxy J7 (2018); Samsung Galaxy J7 Nxt / Core / Neo (2017) (16 GB & 32 GB); Samsung Galaxy J7 Prime (2016); Samsung Galaxy J7 Prime 2 (2018) (G611F); Samsung Galaxy J7 Star (2018) (J737T, J737T1); Samsung Galaxy M10 (2019); Samsung Galaxy on Nxt; Samsung Galaxy On6; Samsung Galaxy On7 (2016); Samsung Galaxy On7 Prime; Samsung Galaxy Wide 3 (J737S); Samsung Galaxy Tab A 10.1 (2016); Samsung Galaxy Tab Active 2 8.0
Exynos 7880	14 nm (Samsung 14LPP)		ARMv8-A	8 cores 1.9 GHz Cortex-A53	Mali-T830 MP3	950	91.2	LPDDR4	32-bit (2×16-bit) Dual-channel	1600 MHz (12.8 GB/sec)	—N/a	LTE Cat.7 3CA 300 Mbit/s (DL) / 2CA 100 Mbit/s (UL)	Bluetooth, Wi-Fi	Q1 2017	List: Samsung Galaxy A5 (2017); Samsung Galaxy A7 (2017)
Exynos 7872	14 nm (Samsung 14LPP)		ARMv8-A	2 + 4 cores (2.0 GHz Cortex-A73 + 1.6 GHz Cortex-A53) GTS	Mali-G71 MP1	1200	28.8	LPDDR3	32-bit Single-channel	933 MHz (7.5 GB/sec)	—N/a	LTE Cat.7 2CA 300 Mbit/s (DL) / Cat.13 2CA 150 Mbit/s (UL)	Bluetooth 4.2, Wi-Fi 802.11a/b/g/n	Q1 2018	Meizu M6s
Exynos 7884A	14 nm (Samsung 14LPP)		ARMv8-A	2 + 6 cores (1.35 GHz Cortex-A73 + 1.35 GHz Cortex-A53) GTS	Mali-G71 MP2	450	21.6	LPDDR4	32-bit (2×16-bit) Dual-channel	1866 MHz (14.9 GB/sec)	—N/a	LTE Cat.4 2CA 150 Mbit/s (DL) / 2CA 50 Mbit/s (UL)	Bluetooth 4.2, Wi-Fi 802.11a/b/g/n	Q3 2018	List: Samsung Galaxy J3 Achieve (2018) (J337P); Samsung Galaxy J3 Aura (2018) (J337R4); Samsung Galaxy J3 V 3rd Gen (2018) (J337V, J337VPP)
Exynos 7884	14 nm (Samsung 14LPP)		ARMv8-A	2 + 6 cores (1.6 GHz Cortex-A73 + 1.35 GHz Cortex-A53) GTS	Mali-G71 MP2	676; 845	32.4; 40.6	LPDDR4	32-bit (2×16-bit) Dual-channel	1866 MHz (14.9 GB/sec)	—N/a	Shannon 327 LTE Cat.12 3CA 600 Mbit/s (DL) / Cat.13 2CA 150 Mbit/s (UL)	Bluetooth 5.0, Wi-Fi 802.11a/b/g/n/ac	Q2 2018	List: Samsung Galaxy A10e; Samsung Galaxy A10; Samsung Galaxy A20e; Samsung Galaxy A20; Samsung Galaxy J7 Aura (2018) (J737R4); Samsung Galaxy J7 Crown (2018) (S767VL); Samsung Galaxy J7 Refine (2018) (J737P); Samsung Galaxy J7 V 2nd Gen (2018) (J737V, J737VPP); Samsung Galaxy Jean2; Samsung Galaxy M10s
Exynos 7885	14 nm (Samsung 14LPP)		ARMv8-A	2 + 6 cores (2.2 GHz Cortex-A73 + 1.6 GHz Cortex-A53) GTS	Mali-G71 MP2	1100	52.8	LPDDR4	32-bit (2×16-bit) Dual-channel	1866 MHz (14.9 GB/sec)	—N/a	Shannon 327 LTE Cat.12 3CA 600 Mbit/s (DL) / Cat.13 2CA 150 Mbit/s (UL)	Bluetooth 5.0, Wi-Fi 802.11a/b/g/n/ac	Q1 2018	List: Samsung Galaxy A7 (2018); Samsung Galaxy A8 (2018); Samsung Galaxy A8+ (2018); Samsung Galaxy Feel 2 (SC-02L); Samsung Galaxy J7 Duo (2018); Samsung Galaxy XCover 4S
Exynos 7904	14 nm (Samsung 14LPP)		ARMv8-A	2 + 6 cores (1.8 GHz Cortex-A73 + 1.6 GHz Cortex-A53) GTS	Mali-G71 MP2	770	37	LPDDR4	32-bit (2×16-bit) Dual-channel	1866 MHz (14.9 GB/sec)	—N/a	Shannon 327 LTE Cat.12 3CA 600 Mbit/s (DL) / Cat.13 2CA 150 Mbit/s (UL)	Bluetooth 5.0, Wi-Fi 802.11a/b/g/n/ac	Q1 2019	List: Samsung Galaxy A30; Samsung Galaxy A30s; Samsung Galaxy A40; Samsung Galaxy M20; Samsung Galaxy M30/A40s; Samsung Galaxy Tab A 10.1 (2019); Samsung Galaxy Tab A 8.4 (2020)
Exynos 8 Octa 8890	14 nm (Samsung 14LPP)		ARMv8-A	4 + 4 cores (2.3 GHz, up to 2.6 GHz in dual-core load, Exynos M1 "Mongoose" + 1.6 GHz Cortex-A53) GTS	Mali-T880 MP12	650	327.6	LPDDR4	64-bit (2×32-bit) Dual-channel	1794 MHz (28.7 GB/s)	—N/a	Shannon 335 LTE DL: LTE Cat 12 600 Mbit/s, 3CA; UL: LTE Cat 13 150 Mbit/s, 2CA	Bluetooth 4.2, Wi-Fi 802.11a/b/g/n/ac	Q1 2016	List: * Meizu PRO 6 Plus (128 GB); MicroVision MV 8890-LCD SBC; Samsung Galaxy S7; Samsung Galaxy S7 Edge (Korean and International versions); Samsung Galaxy Note 7; Galaxy Note Fan Edition
Exynos 8 Octa 8890	14 nm (Samsung 14LPP)		ARMv8-A	4 + 4 cores (2.0 GHz Exynos M1 "Mongoose" + 1.5 GHz Cortex-A53) GTS	Mali-T880 MP10 (Lite)	650	273	LPDDR4	64-bit (2×32-bit) Dual-channel	1794 MHz (28.7 GB/s)	—N/a	Shannon 335 LTE DL: LTE Cat 12 600 Mbit/s, 3CA; UL: LTE Cat 13 150 Mbit/s, 2CA	Bluetooth 4.2, Wi-Fi 802.11a/b/g/n/ac	Q1 2016	Meizu PRO 6 Plus (64 GB)
Exynos 8895	10 nm (Samsung 10LPE)	103.64	ARMv8-A	4 + 4 cores (2.314 GHz Exynos M2 "Mongoose" + 1.69 GHz Cortex-A53) GTS	Mali-G71 MP20	546	262.1	LPDDR4X	64-bit (2×32-bit) Dual-channel	1794 MHz (28.7 GB/s)	—N/a	Shannon 355 LTE DL: LTE Cat 16 1050 Mbit/s, 5CA, 256-QAM); UL: LTE Cat 13 150 Mbit/s, 2CA, 64-QAM	Bluetooth 5.0, Wi-Fi 802.11a/b/g/n/ac	Q2 2017	List: Meizu 15 Plus; Samsung Galaxy S8; Samsung Galaxy S8+; Samsung Galaxy Note 8 (Korean and International versions)
Exynos 9609	10 nm (Samsung 10LPE)		ARMv8-A	4 + 4 cores (2.2 GHz Cortex-A73 + 1.6 GHz Cortex-A53)	Mali-G72 MP3			LPDDR4X	32-bit (2×16-bit) Dual-channel	1600 MHz (12.8 GB/sec)	—N/a	Shannon 337 LTE Cat.12 3CA 600 Mbit/s (DL) / Cat.13 2CA 150 Mbit/s (UL)	Bluetooth 5.0, Wi-Fi 802.11a/b/g/n/ac	Q2 2019	List: Motorola One Vision; Motorola One Action
Exynos 9610	10 nm (Samsung 10LPE)		ARMv8-A	4 + 4 cores (2.3 GHz Cortex-A73 + 1.7 GHz Cortex-A53)	Mali-G72 MP3	1053	113.7	LPDDR4X	32-bit (2×16-bit) Dual-channel	1600 MHz (12.8 GB/sec)	—N/a	Shannon 337 LTE Cat.12 3CA 600 Mbit/s (DL) / Cat.13 2CA 150 Mbit/s (UL)	Bluetooth 5.0, Wi-Fi 802.11a/b/g/n/ac	Q4 2018	Samsung Galaxy A50
Exynos 9611	10 nm (Samsung 10LPE)		ARMv8-A	4 + 4 cores (2.3 GHz Cortex-A73 + 1.7 GHz Cortex-A53)	Mali-G72 MP3	850	91.8	LPDDR4X	32-bit (2×16-bit) Dual-channel	1600 MHz (12.8 GB/sec)	—N/a	Shannon 337 LTE Cat.12 3CA 600 Mbit/s (DL) / Cat.13 2CA 150 Mbit/s (UL)	Bluetooth 5.0, Wi-Fi 802.11a/b/g/n/ac	Q3 2019	List: Samsung Galaxy A50s; Samsung Galaxy A51; Samsung Galaxy F41; Samsung Galaxy M21; Samsung Galaxy M21s; Samsung Galaxy M30s; Samsung Galaxy M31; Samsung Galaxy M31s; Samsung Galaxy Tab S6 Lite; Samsung Galaxy Xcover Pro
Exynos 9810 (S5E9810)	10 nm (Samsung 10LPP)	118.94	ARMv8.2-A	4 + 4 cores (2.9 GHz Exynos M3 "Meerkat" + 1.9 GHz Cortex-A55)	Mali-G72 MP18	572	370.7	LPDDR4X	64-bit (4×16-bit) Quad-channel	1794 MHz (28.7 GB/s)	—N/a	Shannon 360 LTE DL: LTE Cat 18 1200 Mbit/s, 6CA, 256-QAM; UL: LTE Cat 13 200 Mbit/s, 2CA, 256-QAM	Bluetooth 5.0, Wi-Fi 802.11a/b/g/n/ac	Q1 2018	List: Samsung Galaxy S9/S9+; Samsung Galaxy Note 9 (Korean and International versions); Samsung Galaxy Note 10 Lite; Samsung Galaxy Tab Active3
Exynos 9820 (S5E9820)	8 nm (Samsung 8LPP)	127	ARMv8.2-A	2 + 2 + 4 cores (2.73 GHz Exynos M4 "Cheetah" + 2.31 GHz Cortex-A75 + 1.95 GHz Cortex-A55)	Mali-G76 MP12	702	404.4	LPDDR4X	64-bit (4×16-bit) Quad-channel	2093 MHz (33.488 GB/s)	Dual-core NPU 1024 MAC units @ 933 MHz (1.86 TOPs)	Shannon 5000 LTE DL: Cat.20 2000 Mbit/s, 8CA, 256-QAM UL: Cat.13 316 Mbit/s, 3CA, 256-QAM	Bluetooth 5.0, Wi-Fi 802.11a/b/g/n/ac/ax	Q1 2019	List: Samsung Galaxy S10/S10e/S10+ (Korean and International versions)
Exynos 9825 (S5E9825)	7 nm (Samsung 7LPP)		ARMv8.2-A	2 + 2 + 4 cores (2.73 GHz Exynos M4 "Cheetah" + 2.4 GHz Cortex-A75 + 1.95 GHz Cortex-A55)	Mali-G76 MP12	754	434.3	LPDDR4X	64-bit (4×16-bit) Quad-channel	2093 MHz (33.488 GB/s)	Dual-core NPU 1024 MAC units @ 933 MHz (1.86 TOPs)	Shannon 5000 LTE DL: Cat.20 2000 Mbit/s, 8CA, 256-QAM UL: Cat.13 316 Mbit/s, 3CA, 256-QAM	Bluetooth 5.0, Wi-Fi 802.11a/b/g/n/ac/ax	Q3 2019	List: Samsung Galaxy Note10/Note10+ (Korean and International versions); Samsung Galaxy F62/M62

== List of Exynos Wearable SoCs ==
SoC			CPU		GPU			Memory technology			NPU	Modem	Connectivity	Released	Devices using
Model number	Fab.	Die size (mm^{2})	ISA	μarch	μarch	Frequency (MHz)	Performance GFLOPS (FP32)	Type	Bus width (bit)	Bandwidth (GB/s)	NPU	Modem	Connectivity	Released	Devices using
Exynos 4 Dual 4212 (Single core)	32 nm (Samsung 32 nm HKMG)		ARMv7-A	1 core 0.8 GHz Cortex-A9	Mali-400 MP4	400	14.4	LPDDR2, DDR2 or DDR3	64-bit (2×32-bit) Dual-channel	400 MHz (6.4 GB/s)	—N/a			Q3 2013	List: Samsung Galaxy Gear
Exynos 3 Dual 3250	28 nm (Samsung 28 nm HKMG)		ARMv7-A	2 cores 1.0 GHz Cortex-A7	Mali-400 MP2	400	7.2	LPDDR2 or LPDDR3	64-bit (2×32-bit) Dual-channel	400 MHz (6.4 GB/s)	—N/a			Q2 2014	List: Samsung Gear 2 (Neo), Samsung Gear S2 (Bluetooth), Casio WSD-F10/F20
Exynos 7 Dual 7270 (SC57270)	14 nm (Samsung 14LPP)		ARMv8-A	2 cores 1.0 GHz Cortex-A53	Mali-T720 MP1	667	13.3	LPDDR3	32-bit (2×16-bit) Dual-channel	Unknown	—N/a	LTE Cat.4 2CA 150 Mbit/s (DL) / 50 Mbit/s (UL)	Bluetooth 4.2, Wi-Fi 4, GPS, GLONASS, BeiDou, Galileo, eMMC	Q3 2016	List: Samsung Gear S3; Samsung Gear Sport; Casio G-Shock GSW-H1000
Exynos 9110 (SC59110XSC)	10 nm (Samsung 10LPP)		ARMv8-A	2 cores 1.15 GHz Cortex-A53	Mali-T720 MP1	667	13.3	LPDDR4; LPDDR4X	32-bit (2×16-bit) Dual-channel	Unknown	—N/a	Shannon 3012 LTE Cat.4 2CA 150 Mbit/s (DL) / Cat.5 75 Mbit/s (UL)	Bluetooth 4.2, Wi-Fi 4, GPS, GLONASS, BeiDou, Galileo, eMMC	Q3 2018	List: Samsung Galaxy Watch; Samsung Galaxy Watch Active; Samsung Galaxy Watch Active 2; Samsung Galaxy Watch 3; Google Pixel Watch
Exynos W920 (SC55515XBD)	5 nm (Samsung 5LPE)		ARMv8.2-A	2 cores 1.18 GHz Cortex-A55	Mali-G68 MP2	667	85.4	LPDDR4	32-bit (2×16-bit) Dual-channel	Unknown	—N/a	Shannon 3012 LTE Cat.4 2CA 150 Mbit/s (DL) / Cat.5 75 Mbit/s (UL)	Bluetooth 5.0, Wi-Fi 4, GPS, GLONASS, BeiDou, Galileo, eMMC 5.1	Q3 2021	List: Samsung Galaxy Watch 4; Samsung Galaxy Watch 5; Samsung Galaxy Watch FE
Exynos W930 (SC55515XBE)	5 nm (Samsung 5LPE)		ARMv8.2-A	2 cores 1.4 GHz Cortex-A55	Mali-G68 MP2	667	85.4	LPDDR4	32-bit (2×16-bit) Dual-channel	Unknown	—N/a	Shannon 3012 LTE Cat.4 2CA 150 Mbit/s (DL) / Cat.5 75 Mbit/s (UL)	Bluetooth 5.2, Wi-Fi 4, GPS, GLONASS, BeiDou, Galileo, eMMC 5.1	Q3 2023	List: Samsung Galaxy Watch 6
Exynos W1000 (SC55535AHA)	3 nm (Samsung SF3)	17.67	ARMv8.2-A	1 core 1.6 GHz Cortex-A78; 4 cores 1.5 GHz Cortex-A55	Mali-G68 MP2	702	89.9	LPDDR5	32-bit (2×16-bit) Dual-channel	Unknown	—N/a	Shannon 3012 LTE Cat.4 2CA 150 Mbit/s (DL) / Cat.5 75 Mbit/s (UL)	Bluetooth 6.0, Wi-Fi 4, GPS, GLONASS, BeiDou, Galileo, eMMC 5.1	Q3 2024	List: Samsung Galaxy Watch 7; Samsung Galaxy Watch Ultra; Samsung Galaxy Watch 8

== List of Exynos modems ==
Exynos Modem 303

- Supported modes LTE FDD, LTE TDD, WCDMA and GSM/EDGE
- LTE Cat. 6
- Downlink: 2CA 300 Mbit/s 64-QAM
- Uplink: 100 Mbit/s 16-QAM
- 28 nm HKMG Process
- Paired with: Exynos 5 Octa 5430 and Exynos 7 Octa 5433
- Devices using: Samsung Galaxy Note 4, Samsung Galaxy Note Edge and Samsung Galaxy Alpha

Exynos Modem 333

- Supported modes LTE FDD, LTE TDD, WCDMA, TD-SCDMA and GSM/EDGE
- LTE Cat. 10
- Downlink: 3CA 450 Mbit/s 64-QAM
- Uplink: 2CA 100 Mbit/s 16-QAM
- 28 nm HKMG Process
- Paired with: Exynos 7 Octa 7420
- Devices using: Samsung Galaxy S6, Samsung Galaxy Note 5 and Samsung Galaxy A8 (2016)

Exynos Modem 5100

- Supported Modes: 5G NR Sub-6 GHz, 5G NR mmWave, LTE-FDD, LTE-TDD, HSPA, TD-SCDMA, WCDMA, CDMA, GSM/EDGE
- Downlink Features:
  - 8CA (Carrier Aggregation) in 5G NR
  - 8CA 1.6 Gbit/s in LTE Cat. 19
  - 4x4 MIMO
  - FD-MIMO
  - Up to 256-QAM in sub-6 GHz, 2 Gbit/s
  - Up to 64-QAM in mmWave, 6 Gbit/s
- Uplink Features:
  - 2CA (Carrier Aggregation) in 5G NR
  - 2CA in LTE
  - Up to 256-QAM in sub-6 GHz
  - Up to 64-QAM in mmWave
- Process: 10 nm FinFET Process
- Paired with: Exynos 9820 and Exynos 9825
- Devices using: Samsung Galaxy S10 and Samsung Galaxy Note 10

Exynos Modem 5123

- Supported Modes: 5G NR Sub-6 GHz, 5G NR mmWave, LTE-FDD, LTE-TDD, HSPA, TD-SCDMA, WCDMA, CDMA, GSM/EDGE
- Downlink Features:
  - 8CA 1024-QAM in LTE Cat. 24 (3.0 Gbit/s )
  - Up to 256-QAM in sub-6 GHz (5.1 Gbit/s)
  - Up to 64-QAM in mmWave (7.35 Gbit/s)
- Uplink Features:
  - 2CA 256-QAM in LTE Cat. 22 (422 Mbit/s )
  - Up to 256-QAM in sub-6 GHz
  - Up to 64-QAM in mmWave
- Process: 7 nm FinFET Process
- Paired with: Exynos 990, Exynos 2100, and Google Tensor
- Devices using: Samsung Galaxy S20, Samsung Galaxy Note 20, Samsung Galaxy S21, and Google Pixel 6

Exynos Modem 5300

- Supported Modes: 3GPP Release 16 5G NR Sub-6 GHz & mmWave (SA/NSA), LTE-FDD, LTE-TDD, HSPA, TD-SCDMA, WCDMA, CDMA, GSM/EDGE
- Downlink Features: Up to 10 Gbit/s
  - 5G sub-6 GHz
    - Up to 256-QAM
    - 4x4 MIMO
    - 200 MHz carrier aggregation
  - 5G mmWave
    - Up to 64-QAM
    - 2x2 MIMO
    - 800 MHz carrier aggregation
- Uplink Features: Up to 3.9 Gbit/s
  - 5G sub-6 GHz
    - Up to 256-QAM
    - 2x2 MIMO
    - 400 MHz carrier aggregation
  - 5G mmWave
    - Up to 64-QAM
    - 2x2 MIMO
    - 800 MHz carrier aggregation
- Process: 4 nm EUV
- Paired with: Google Tensor G2, Google Tensor G3 and Google Tensor G4 found in the Google Pixel 9a
- Devices using: Google Pixel 7, Google Pixel 8, Google Pixel 9a

Exynos Modem 5400

- Supported Modes: 3GPP Release 17 5G NR Sub-6 GHz & mmWave (SA/NSA/NTN), LTE-FDD, LTE-TDD, HSPA, WCDMA, GSM/EDGE, NB-IoT NTN
- Downlink Features:
  - 5G FR1
    - Up to 11.2 Gbit/s
    - Up to 1024-QAM
    - 4x4 MIMO
    - 380 MHz carrier aggregation (5CA: 3x 100 MHz + 2x 40 MHz)
  - 5G FR2
    - Up to 14.8 Gbit/s
    - Up to 256-QAM
    - 2x2 MIMO
    - 1000 MHz carrier aggregation
- Uplink Features: Up to 3.9 Gbit/s
  - 5G FR1
    - Up to 256-QAM
    - 2x2 MIMO
    - 400 MHz carrier aggregation
  - 5G FR2
    - Up to 64-QAM
    - 2x2 MIMO
    - 800 MHz carrier aggregation
- Process: 4 nm EUV
- Paired with: Google Tensor G4, G5
- Devices using it: Google Pixel 9, Pixel 10

Exynos Modem 5410

- Supported Modes: 3GPP Release 17 5G NR Sub-6 GHz & mmWave (SA/NSA), LTE-FDD, LTE-TDD, HSPA, WCDMA, GSM/EDGE, NB-IoT NTN
- Downlink Features:
  - 5G FR1
    - Up to 11.2 Gbit/s
    - Up to 1024-QAM
    - 4x4 MIMO
    - 380 MHz carrier aggregation (5CA: 3x 100 MHz + 2x 40 MHz)
  - 5G FR2
    - Up to 14.8 Gbit/s
    - Up to 256-QAM
    - 2x2 MIMO
    - 1000 MHz carrier aggregation
- Uplink Features: Up to 3.9 Gbit/s
  - 5G FR1
    - Up to 256-QAM
    - 2x2 MIMO
    - 400 MHz carrier aggregation
  - 5G FR2
    - Up to 64-QAM
    - 2x2 MIMO
    - 800 MHz carrier aggregation
- Process: 4 nm EUV
- Paired with: Exynos 2600
- Devices using it: TBA.

== List of Exynos IoT SoCs ==
Exynos i T200

- CPU: Cortex-M4 @ 320 MHz, Cortex-M0+ @ 320 MHz
- WiFi: 802.11b/g/n Single band (2.4 GHz)
- On-chip Memory: SRAM 1.4 MB
- Interface: SDIO/ I2C/ SPI/ UART/ PWM/ I2S
- Front-end Module: Integrated T/R switch, Power Amplifier, Low Noise Amplifier
- Security: WEP 64/128, WPA, WPA2, AES, TKIP, WAPI, PUF (Physically Unclonable Function)

Exynos i S111

- CPU: Cortex-M7 200 MHz
- Modem: LTE Release 14 NB-IoT
  - Downlink: 127 kbit/s
  - Uplink: 158 kbit/s
- On-chip Memory: SRAM 512 KB
- Interface: USI, UART, I2C, GPIO, eSIM I/F, SDIO(Host), QSPI(Single/Dual/Quad IO mode), SMC
- Security: eFuse, AES, SHA-2, PKA, Secure Storage, Security Sub-System, PUF
- GNSS: GPS, Galileo, GLONASS, BeiDou

== List of Exynos Automotive SoCs ==
=== Exynos Auto series ===
SoC			CPU	GPU			Memory technology			NPU	Modem	Connectivity	Released	Vehicles
Model number	Fab.	Die size (mm^{2})	CPU	μarch	Frequency (MHz)	Performance GFLOPS (FP32)	Type	Bus width (bit)	Bandwidth (GB/s)	NPU	Modem	Connectivity	Released	Vehicles
Exynos Auto 8890 (SGA8890A)	14 nm (Samsung 14LPP)		4 + 4 cores (2.6 GHz Exynos M1 "Mongoose" + 1.6 GHz Cortex-A53) (ARMv8-A)	Mali-T880 MP12	650	327.6	LPDDR4	64-bit (2×32-bit) Dual-channel		—N/a	Shannon LTE; DL: LTE Cat 12 600 Mbit/s, 3CA; UL: LTE Cat 13 150 Mbit/s, 2CA	Bluetooth 4.2, Wi-Fi 5	Q1 2017	Audi A4 (B9) (2019–2025)
Exynos Auto T5123	7 nm (Samsung 7LPP)		2 cores Cortex-A55 (ARMv8.2-A)				LPDDR4X	16-bit (1×16-bit) Single-channel	2133 MHz (8.5 GB/s)	—N/a	LTE DL: Cat.24 3000 Mbit/s, 8CA, 1024-QAM; UL: Cat.22 422 Mbit/s, 2CA, 256-QAM; 5G NR Sub-6 GHz DL: 4.55 Gbit/s UL: 1.92 Gbit/s		Q4 2021	
Exynos Auto V7	8 nm (Samsung 8LPP)		8 cores 1.5 GHz Cortex-A76 (ARMv8.2-A)	2× Mali-G76 (MP8 + MP3)			LPDDR4X; LPDDR5	128-bit (8×16-bit) Octa-channel	2133 MHz (68.2 GB/s)	NPU			Q4 2021	
Exynos Auto V9 (S5AHR80A)	8 nm (Samsung 8LPP)		8 cores 2.1 GHz Cortex-A76 (ARMv8.2-A)	3× Mali-G76 (MP12 + MP3 + MP3)			LPDDR4X; LPDDR5	128-bit (8×16-bit) Octa-channel		NPU (8.5 TOPS)		Bluetooth 5.0, Wi-Fi 6	Q1 2019	
Exynos Auto V920 (S5AV920)	5 nm (Samsung 5LPE)	148.72	10 cores (4+4+2); ARM Cortex-A78AE (ARMv8.2-A)	Xclipse (RDNA 2 based 512:32:32:8; 4 WGP)			LPDDR5	128-bit (8×16-bit) Octa-channel	3200 MHz (102.4 GB/s)	NPU (23.1 TOPS)			2025	

The Exynos Auto V9 comes with additional features such as:

- Automotive Safety Integrity Level (ASIL)-B standards
- Safety island core
- 4× Tensilica HiFi 4 DSP
- Supports up to 6 displays, and up to 12 camera connections (4/4/4 MIPI CSI)
- Supports 4096x4096 120fps encoding and decoding with HEVC(H.265)
- 2x Gb Ethernet

The Exynos Auto V920 comes with additional features such as:

- 3× Tensilica HiFi 5 DSP
- Supports up to 6 Displays (3x 5K (8K*2K) + 3x DFHD (3840*1440)), and up to 12 Cameras (3x MIPI CSI 4lanes)
- Supports 4K 240fps decoding (HEVC), 4K 120fps encoding
- 2x USXGMII (10 Gbit/s) Ethernet

== Controversies ==
=== Performance discrepancies ===
Samsung's flagship smartphones (except the foldable Galaxy Z series) released between 2016 (Galaxy S7) and 2022 (Galaxy S22), as well as the Galaxy S24 and S24+, utilizes both the Exynos and Qualcomm Snapdragon SoCs, with the latter being used mainly in models for American and East Asian (except South Korea) markets, and other regions using the former.

While both the Exynos and Snapdragon versions of the Galaxy S7, S8, and Note 8 have similar performances, the Exynos 9810-based models of Galaxy S9 and Note 9 has worse performance and efficiency than the Snapdragon 845 models. The Exynos 9820 used in Galaxy S10, which utilizes older CPU cores and inferior manufacturing process than the Snapdragon 855, continued this discrepancy.

=== Stability issues ===
Some of Samsung's phone models released between 2019 - 2021 that used Exynos 9611 processor were widely reported by customers having random restarts, freezing and bootloops. Specific phone models include the Galaxy A50, A50s, A51, M30s, M21, M31, M31s, F41 and Galaxy M21 (2021). Although the issue went unreported on mainstream media and very few YouTube reviewers covered it based on user reports, the issues were widely documented on Samsung Members official community forum as well as Reddit and other forums. The impact was significant with hundreds of user posts and comments between 2020 and 2023. Samsung did free board replacements for some early customers who had the phone in warranty. However, the majority of people faced the issue after the 12-month warranty period, mostly starting 1.5 – 3 years after purchase. Samsung never officially acknowledged the issue and no software update was released to solve the problem, although the phones received the promised minimum 4 year security updates. The only official solution available to customers was to purchase replacement board that cost around 60-70% of the phone's cost. Most users resorted to risky yet cheaper third party repair that required re-soldering (also called reballing) the CPU & RAM PoP (Package on Package) which managed to solve issue according to dozens of user reports on said forums.

== See also ==
- Comparison of Armv8-A processors
- Comparison of Armv7-A processors

== Similar platforms ==
- A-Series by Allwinner
- Apple silicon (A/S/T/W/H/U/M series) by Apple Inc.
- Kirin by HiSilicon (Huawei)
- i.MX by NXP
- Jaguar and Puma by AMD
- MT by MediaTek
- NovaThor by ST-Ericsson
- OMAP by Texas Instruments
- RK by Rockchip Electronics
- Snapdragon by Qualcomm
- Tegra by Nvidia
