= Android Oreo =

2017 Android mobile operating system

- Version of the Android operating system

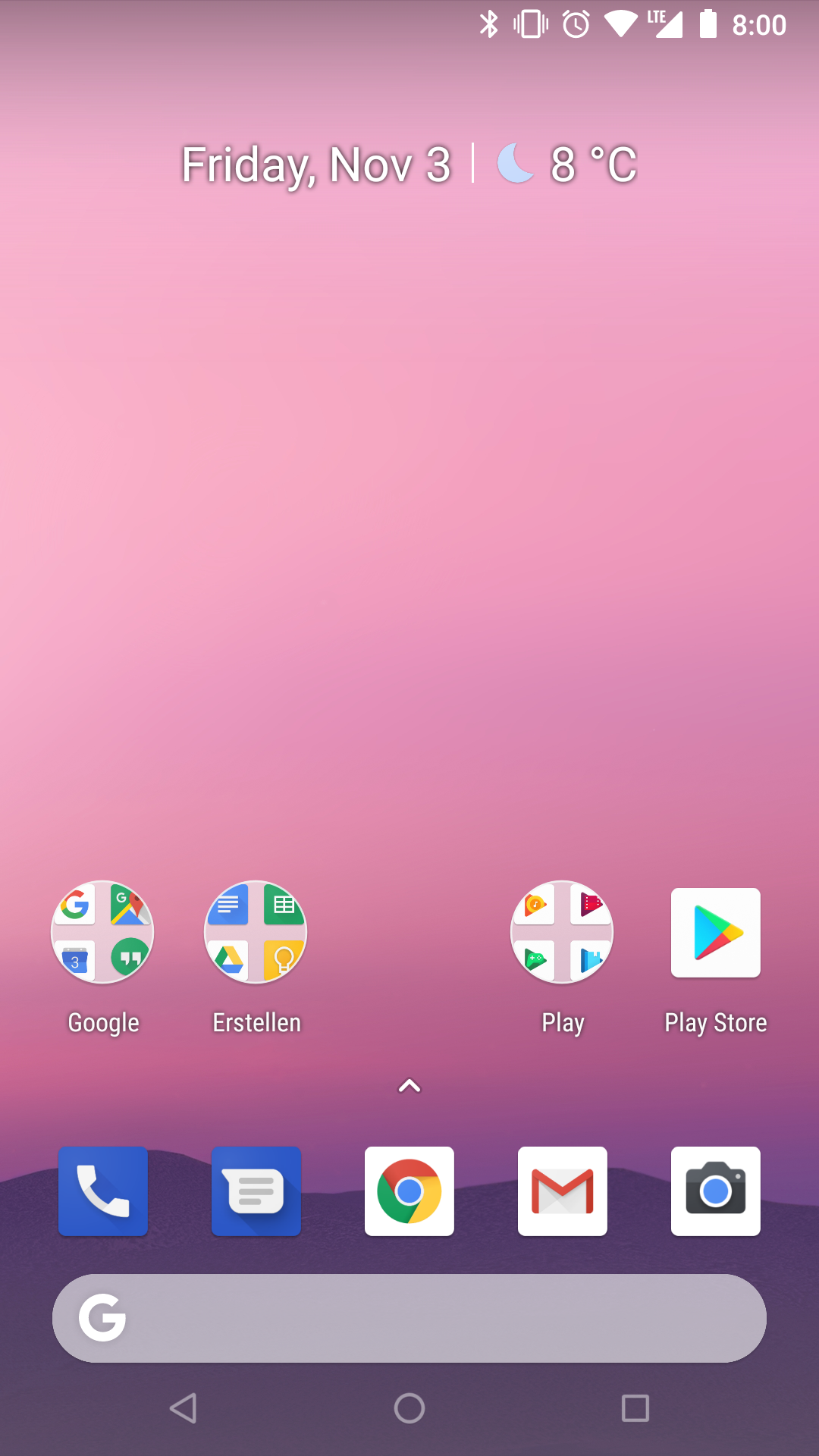
- Android 8.1 home screen with Pixel Launcher
- Developer: Google
- General availability: August 21, 2017; 9 years ago (on Android 8.0) December 5, 2017; 8 years ago (on Android 8.1)
- Final release: 8.1.0_r93 (OSN1.210329.015) / October 4, 2021; 5 years ago
- Final preview: 8.1.0 (OPP6.171019.012) / November 27, 2017; 8 years ago
- Kernel type: Monolithic (Linux)
- Preceded by: Android Nougat (7.x)
- Succeeded by: Android Pie (9)

Support status
- Android 8.0: Unsupported as of January 5, 2021; Android 8.1: Unsupported as of October 4, 2021; Google Play Services supported

Android Oreo (codenamed Android O during development) is the eighth major release and the 15th version of Android, a mobile operating system.

It was initially unveiled as an alpha quality developer preview in March 2017 and later made available to the public on August 21, 2017.

It contains several major features, including notification channels, picture-in-picture support for video, performance improvements, and battery usage optimization, and support for autofillers, Bluetooth 5, system-level integration with VoIP apps, wide color gamuts, and Wi-Fi Aware. Android Oreo also introduces two major platform features: Android Go – a software distribution of the operating system for low-end devices – and support for implementing a hardware abstraction layer.

As of June 2026, 2.03% of Android devices run Android Oreo, making it the 9th most widely used version of Android.

== History ==
Android Oreo logo

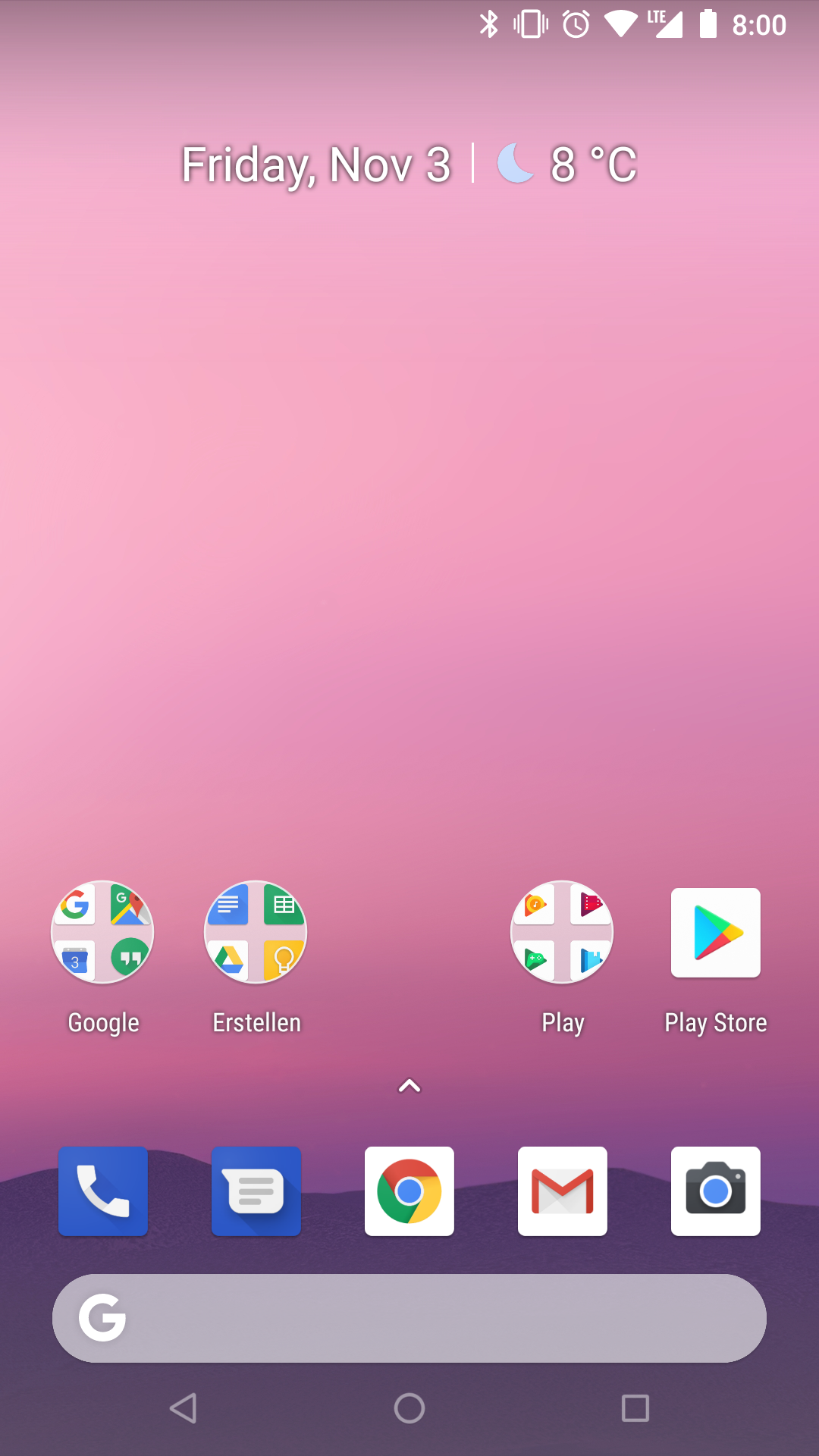
Android 8.1 home screen

Android Oreo was internally codenamed "Oatmeal Cookie." On March 21, 2017, Google released the first developer preview of Android "O", available for the Nexus 5X, Nexus 6P, Nexus Player, Pixel C, and both Pixel smartphones. The second, considered beta quality, was released on May 17, 2017. The third developer preview was released on June 8, 2017, and offered a finalized version of the API. DP3 finalized the release's API to API level 26, changed the camera UI, reverted the Wi-Fi and cellular connectivity levels in the status bar back to Wi-Fi being on the left, added themed notifications, added a battery animation in Settings: Battery, a new icon and darker background for the Clock app, and a teardrop icon shape for apps.

On July 24, 2017, a fourth developer preview was released, which included the final system behaviors and the latest bug fixes and optimizations. Android "O" was officially released on August 21, 2017, under the name "Oreo", after the Oreo brand of sandwich cookie. Its lawn statue was unveiled at a promotional event across from Chelsea Market in New York City—a building which formerly housed a Nabisco factory where Oreo cookies were first produced. Factory images were made available for compatible Pixel and Nexus devices later that day. The Sony Xperia XZ1 and Sony Xperia XZ1 Compact were the first devices available with Oreo pre-installed.

Android 8.1 was released in December 2017 for Pixel and Nexus devices, which features minor bug fixes and user interface changes.

== Features ==
=== User experience ===
Notifications can be snoozed, and batched into topic-based groups known as "channels". The 'Major Ongoing' feature orders the alerts by priority, pinning the most important application to the top slot. Android Oreo contains integrated support for picture-in-picture modes. The "Settings" app features a new design which has been reduced in size, with a white theme and deeper categorization of different settings, while its ringtone, alarm and notification sound settings now contain an option for adding custom sounds to the list. Tooltips can also be set for views.

The Android 8.1 update supports the display of battery percentages for connected Bluetooth devices, makes the notification shade slightly translucent, and dims the on-screen navigation keys to reduce the possibility of burn-in. Notification alert sounds are also limited to one per second for each app.

=== Platform ===
Android Oreo adds support for Neighborhood Aware Networking (NAN) for Wi-Fi based on Wi-Fi Aware, Bluetooth 5, wide color gamuts in apps, an API for autofillers, multiprocess and Google Browsing support for WebViews, an API to allow system-level integration for VoIP apps, and launching activities on remote displays. Android Runtime (ART) features performance improvements. Android Oreo contains additional limits on apps' background activities to improve battery life. Apps can specify "adaptive icons" for differently-shaped containers specified by themes, such as circles, squares, and squircles.

Android Oreo adds native support for Advanced Audio Coding, aptX, aptX HD and LDAC Bluetooth codecs. Android Oreo supports new emoji that were included in the Unicode 10 standard. A new emoji font was also introduced, which notably redesigns its face figures to use a traditional circular shape, as opposed to the "blob" design that was introduced on KitKat. Support for downloadable fonts was introduced in Android Oreo; this functionality is also available for older versions of Android via the AndroidX Core library.

The Android architecture was revised so that low-level, vendor-specific code for supporting a device's hardware can be separated from the Android OS framework using a hardware abstraction layer known as the "vendor interface". Vendor interfaces must be forward-compatible with future versions of Android. This new architecture, called Project Treble, allows the quicker development and deployment of Android updates for devices, as vendors would only need to make the necessary modifications to their bundled software. All devices shipping with Oreo must support a vendor interface, but this feature is optional for devices being updated to Oreo from an earlier version. The "seamless updates" system introduced in Android 7.0 was also modified to download update files directly to the system partition, rather than requiring them to be downloaded to the user partition first. This reduces storage space requirements for system updates.

Android Oreo introduces a new automatic repair system known as "Rescue Party"; if the operating system detects that core system components are persistently crashing during startup, it will automatically perform a series of escalating repair steps. If all automatic repair steps are exhausted, the device will reboot into recovery mode and prompt a factory reset.

The Android 8.1 update also introduces a neural network API designed to "[provide] apps with hardware acceleration for on-device machine learning operations." This API is designed for use with machine learning platforms such as TensorFlow Lite, and specialized co-processors such as the Pixel Visual Core (featured in Google's Pixel 2 smartphones, but dormant until 8.1 is installed), but it also provides a CPU fallback mode.

=== Android Go ===
A tailored distribution for low-end devices known as Android Go was unveiled for Oreo; it is intended for devices with 1 GB of RAM or less. This mode includes platform optimizations to reduce mobile data usage (including enabling Data Saver mode by default) and a special suite of Google Mobile Services designed to be less resource- and bandwidth-intensive. The Google Play Store would also highlight lightweight apps suited for these devices. The operating system's interface is also modified, with the quick settings panel providing greater prominence to information regarding the battery, mobile data limit, and available storage, the recent apps menu using a modified layout and being limited to four apps (to reduce RAM consumption), and an API for allowing mobile carriers to implement data tracking and top-ups within the Android settings menu. Google Play Services was also modularized to reduce its memory footprint.

Android Go was made available to OEMs for Android 8.1.

=== Security ===
Android Oreo rebrands multiple security features provided by Google Play Services under the blanket name "Google Play Protect", including automatic scanning of Google Play Store and sideloaded apps, and Android Device Manager, which is now branded as "Find My Device". As opposed to a single, system-wide setting for enabling the installation of apps from sources outside of the Google Play Store, this function is now implemented as a permission that can be granted to individual apps (i.e., clients for third-party app repositories such as Amazon Appstore and F-Droid). A verified boot now includes a "Rollback Protection" feature that prevents rolling back the device to a previous version of Android, aimed at preventing a potential thief from bypassing security measures by installing a previous version of the operating system that doesn't have them in place.

== See also ==
- Android version history
- iOS 11
- macOS High Sierra
- Windows 10
- Windows 10 Mobile
