= Samsung Galaxy C7 =

2016 smartphone from Samsung

Samsung Galaxy C7 Samsung Galaxy C7 Pro
- Brand: Samsung
- Manufacturer: Samsung Electronics
- Type: Smartphone
- Series: Galaxy C
- First released: C7: May 26, 2016; 10 years ago C7 Pro: January 13, 2017; 9 years ago
- Availability by region: C7: China, Hong Kong June 29, 2016; 9 years ago C7 Pro: China, Hong Kong February 2017; 9 years ago; India, Nepal, Sri Lanka April 2017; 9 years ago
- Successor: Samsung Galaxy C8 / C7 (2017)
- Related: Samsung Galaxy C5; Samsung Galaxy C9 Pro
- Compatible networks: GSM / HSPA / LTE
- Form factor: Slate
- Colors: C7: Dark Gray, Gold, Pink Gold; C7 Pro: Dark Blue, Gold, Pink Gold
- Dimensions: C7: 156.6 mm (6.17 in) H; 77.2 mm (3.04 in) W; 6.8 mm (0.27 in) D; C7 Pro: 156.5 mm (6.16 in) H; 77.2 mm (3.04 in) W; 7 mm (0.28 in) D
- Weight: C7: 169 g (6.0 oz); C7 Pro: 172 g (6.1 oz)
- Operating system: Original: C7: Android 6.0.1 Marshmallow with TouchWiz Hero UX; C7 Pro: Android 6.0.1 Marshmallow with TouchWiz Grace UX; Current: Android 8.0 Oreo with Samsung Experience 9.0
- System-on-chip: C7: Qualcomm MSM8953 Snapdragon 625; C7 Pro: Qualcomm MSM8953-Pro Snapdragon 626
- CPU: C7: Octa-core (2 GHz Cortex-A53); C7 Pro: Octa-core (2.2 GHz Cortex-A53)
- GPU: Adreno 506
- Modem: Qualcomm Snapdragon X9 LTE
- Memory: 4 GB
- Storage: C7: 32 or 64 GB; C7 Pro: 64 GB eMMC 5.1
- Removable storage: microSDXC, up to 256 GB
- SIM: Hybrid Dual SIM (Nano-SIM)
- Battery: Non-removable, Li-Ion 3300 mAh
- Charging: 18 W
- Rear camera: 16 MP, f/1.9, AF dual-LED (dual tone) flash, HDR, panorama Video: 1080p @ 30 fps
- Front camera: C7: 8 MP, f/1.9 C7 Pro: 16 MP, f/1.9, 27 mm (wide), 1/3.06", 1 μm Video: 1080p @ 30 fps
- Display: 5.7 in (140 mm) 1080 × 1920 pixels (386 ppi) Super AMOLED
- Sound: Mono speaker
- Connectivity: Wi-Fi :802.11 a/b/g/n/ac (2.4/5 GHz) (dual-band, Wi-Fi Direct, DLNA); GPS/GLONASS/BeiDou (C7); NFC; Bluetooth 4.2; MicroUSB (C7) / USB-C (C7 Pro) (USB 2.0, USB OTG); 3.50 mm (0.138 in) headphone jack
- Model: C7: SM-C7000; C7: SM-C7010, SM-C7018, SM-C701F

The Samsung Galaxy C7 and Samsung Galaxy C7 Pro are mid-range Android smartphones produced by Samsung Electronics as a part of its Galaxy C series. The Galaxy C7 was announced in May 2016 and was released in June of the same year, while the Galaxy C7 Pro was announced in January 2016 and was released in February of the same year.

== Design ==
The front is made of glass (Corning Gorilla Glass 4 on the Galaxy C7 Pro). Both phones feature aluminum bodies.

On the bottom of the smartphones, there is a 3.5 mm audio jack, a microphone, a USB port (microUSB on the Galaxy C7 and USB-C on the Galaxy C7 Pro), and a speaker. On the top, there is a second microphone. On the left, there are the volume buttons, while on the right, there is the power button and a SIM-tray with one slot for a Nano-SIM and one hybrid slot for a Nano-SIM or a microSD card.

On the front, there is the screen with the logo, a front-facing camera, an earpiece speaker, a proximity/ambient light sensor, and an LED indicator (only on the Galaxy C7) above it, and one physical ("home") with an integrated fingerprint scanner and two touch-sensitive ("recent apps" and "back") navigation buttons with LED backlighting below the display. On the back, there is the logo, a rear-facing camera, and a dual-tone LED flash.

The Galaxy C7 came in Dark Gray, Gold, and Pink Gold color options, while the Galaxy C7 Pro features a Dark Blue option instead of Dark Gray.

== Specifications ==
=== Hardware ===
The Galaxy C7 is powered by the Qualcomm Snapdragon 625 SoC, while the Galaxy C5 Pro is powered by the Qualcomm Snapdragon 626 SoC (an overclocked Snapdragon 625). The Galaxy C7 came with 32 or 64 GB of internal storage depending on configuration, while the Galaxy C7 Pro came only 64 GB. Storage capacity can be expanded via a microSD card by up to 256 GB. Both phones come with 4 GB of RAM.

Both phones are equipped with non-removable lithium-ion batteries with a capacity of 3300 mAh and a 18 W fast charging support.

The smartphones feature 5.7-inch Super AMOLED displays with a Full HD (1920 × 1080 pixels) resolution, a 16:9 aspect ratio and a 386 ppi pixel density.

The phones feature 16 MP rear-facing cameras with an f/1.9 aperture and autofocus. The Galaxy C7 has an 8 MP front-facing while the Galaxy C7 Pro has a 16 MP; both feature an f/1.9 aperture. Both rear and front cameras can record video at up to 1080p at 30 fps.

=== Software ===
The phones come with TouchWiz user interface (Hero UX on the Galaxy C7 and Grace UX on the Pro model) on top of Android 6.0.1 Marshmallow. Later, the smartphones were updated to Samsung Experience 9.0 based on Android 8.0 Oreo.

== See also ==
- Samsung Electronics
- Samsung Galaxy
