= Intel XMM modems =

Series of modems for mobile devices by Intel

The Intel XMM modems are a series of 4G LTE, LTE Advanced, LTE Advanced Pro and 5G modems found in many phones, tablets, laptops and wearables (sans 5g-technology) developed by Intel Mobile Communications. Intel Mobile Communications was formed after Intel acquired the Wireless Solutions (WLS) division of Infineon early in 2011 for US$1.4 billion.

On April 16, 2019, Apple and Qualcomm reached a settlement which included Apple paying an unspecified amount, entering into a six-year patent licensing agreement, and a multi-year agreement for Qualcomm to provide hardware to Apple. Shortly after Intel announced they will exit the 5G smartphone modem business to focus 5G efforts on network infrastructure.

On July 25, 2019, Apple and Intel announced an agreement for Apple to acquire Intel Mobile Communications' smartphone modem business for US$1 billion. Intel will continue to develop modems for non-smartphones such as PCs, Internet of things and autonomous vehicles.

On November 25, 2019, MediaTek and Intel announced a partnership to bring 5G to PCs in 2021.

== 5G modems ==
=== Intel XMM 8160 5G modem ===
- Protocols: 5G NR NSA & SA, EN-DC, LTE NR dual-connectivity, Legacy 2G/3G/4G modes, FDD/TDD
- Single Chip Multi-mode support
- Downlink speeds of up to 6 Gbit/s
- Sub-6 GHz and 26/28/39 GHz mmWave
- Intel 10nm process
- Cancelled as of April 16, 2019

=== Intel XMM 8060 5G modem ===
- Protocols: 5G NR NSA & SA, EN-DC, LTE NR dual-connectivity, Legacy 2G/3G/4G modes, FDD/TDD
- Multi-mode support
- Downlink speeds of up to 6 Gbit/s
- Sub-6 GHz and 26/28/39 GHz mmWave
- Intel 14 nm process
- Cancelled as of November 14, 2018

== 4G modems ==
=== Intel XMM 7660 modem ===
- Protocols: LTE Advanced Pro, FDD/TDD, DC-HSPA+, TD-SCDMA, GSM/GPRS, CDMA/EVDO, LAA, CBRS
- Downlink LTE: LTE Category 19 (1600 Mbit/s). 7x20 MHz carrier aggregation. Up to 256-QAM. Up to 4x4 MIMO
- Uplink LTE: LTE Category 13 (225 Mbit/s). 3x20 MHz carrier aggregation. Up to 64-QAM
- Support of more than 45 (4G/LTE) bands simultaneously
- Featured in: iPhone 11, 11 Pro/11 Pro Max, iPhone SE 2
- Intel 14nm+ FinFET process
- Released Q3 2019

=== Intel XMM 7560 modem ===
- Protocols: LTE Advanced Pro, FDD/TDD, DC-HSPA+, TD-SCDMA, GSM/GPRS, CDMA/EVDO
- Downlink LTE: LTE Category 16 (1000 Mbit/s). 5x20 MHz carrier aggregation. Up to 256-QAM. Up to 4x4 MIMO
- Uplink LTE: LTE Category 13 (150 Mbit/s). 2x20 MHz carrier aggregation. Up to 64-QAM
- Support of more than 35 (4G/LTE) bands simultaneously
- Featured in: iPhone XS/XS Max/XR, iPad Pro (2018), HP Spectre Folio
- Intel 14nm process
- Released Q3 2018
- Fibocom L860-GL

=== Intel XMM 7480 modem ===
- Protocols: LTE Advanced, FDD/TDD, DC-HSPA+, TD-SCDMA, GSM/GPRS
- Downlink LTE: LTE Category 12 (600 Mbit/s). 4x20 MHz carrier aggregation. Up to 256-QAM
- Uplink LTE: LTE Category 13 (150 Mbit/s). 1x20 MHz carrier aggregation. Up to 64-QAM
- Featured in: iPhone X/iPhone 8 (some model used Snapdragon X16 LTE Modem).
- TSMC 28nm process
- Released Q3 2017
- Apple iPhone 8/iPhone 8 Plus, iPhone X

=== Intel XMM 7360 modem ===
- Protocols: LTE Advanced, FDD/TDD, DC-HSPA+, TD-SCDMA
- Downlink LTE: LTE Category 10 (450 Mbit/s). 3x20 MHz carrier aggregation.
- Uplink LTE: 50 Mbit/s
- Featured in: iPhone 7 (some model used Snapdragon X12 LTE Modem), HP Envy x2
- TSMC 28nm process
- Released Q3 2016
- Apple iPhone 7/iPhone 7 Plus, Fibocom L850-GL

=== Intel XMM 7260/7262 modem ===
- Protocols: LTE Advanced, FDD/TDD, DC-HSPA+, TD-SCDMA
- Downlink LTE: LTE Category 6 (300 Mbit/s). 2x20 MHz carrier aggregation.
- Uplink LTE: 50 Mbit/s
- Featured in: Microsoft Surface 3
- Released Q2 2015
- Fibocom L830

=== Intel XMM 7160 modem ===
- Protocols: LTE-FDD and DC-HSPA+
- Downlink LTE: LTE Category 4 (150 Mbit/s)
- Uplink LTE: 50 Mbit/s
- Featured in: Samsung Galaxy S5
- Released Q2 2014
- Telit LN930

=== Intel XMM 7120M modem ===
- Protocols: LTE FDD and DC-HSPA+
- Downlink LTE: LTE Category 1 (10 Mbit/s)
- Uplink LTE: LTE Category 1 (5 Mbit/s).
- Featured in: Samsung Galaxy Tab 3 10.1
- Released Q2 2013

== 3G and 2G modems ==
- Intel XMM 6260 (HSPA+)
- Intel XMM 6255/6255M (HSPA)
- Intel XMM 6140 (HSPA)
- Intel XMM 2250/2230 modem (EDGE)
- Intel XMM 1180 modem (GSM/GPRS)
- Intel XMM 1100 modem (GSM/GPRS)

== Similar platforms ==
- Balong Modems by HiSilicon
- Exynos Modems by Samsung
- Helio M Modems by MediaTek
- Makalu/SC Modems by Unisoc (formally Spreadtrum)
- Snapdragon Modems by Qualcomm
