= Samsung Galaxy C5 =

Android-based smartphone produced, released and marketed by Samsung Electronics

Samsung Galaxy C5 Samsung Galaxy C5 Pro
- Manufacturer: Samsung Electronics
- Type: Smartphone
- Series: Galaxy C
- First released: C5: May 26, 2016; 10 years ago C5 Pro: March 7, 2017; 9 years ago
- Availability by region: C5: June 29, 2016; 9 years ago China, Hong Kong; C5 Pro: March 2017; 9 years ago May 2016; 10 years ago China, Hong Kong
- Related: Samsung Galaxy C7; Samsung Galaxy C9 Pro
- Compatible networks: GSM / HSPA / LTE
- Form factor: Slate
- Colors: C5: Dark Gray, Gold, Pink Gold; C5 Pro: Lake Blue, Maple Leaf, Powder Rose
- Dimensions: C5: 145.9 mm (5.74 in) H; 72 mm (2.8 in) W; 6.7 mm (0.26 in) D; C5 Pro: 145.7 mm (5.74 in) H; 71.4 mm (2.81 in) W; 7 mm (0.28 in) D
- Weight: C5: 143 g (5.0 oz); C5 Pro: 145 g (5.1 oz)
- Operating system: Original: C5: Android 6.0.1 Marshmallow with TouchWiz Hero UX; C5 Pro: Android 6.0.1 Marshmallow with TouchWiz Grace UX; Current: Android 8.0 Oreo with Samsung Experience 9.0
- System-on-chip: C5: Qualcomm MSM8952 Snapdragon 617; C5 Pro: Qualcomm MSM8953-Pro Snapdragon 626
- CPU: C5: Octa-core (4x1.5 GHz Cortex-A53 & 4x1.2 GHz Cortex-A53); C5 Pro: Octa-core (2.2 GHz Cortex-A53)
- GPU: C5: Adreno 405; C5 Pro: Adreno 506
- Modem: C5: Qualcomm Snapdragon X8 LTE; C5 Pro: Qualcomm Snapdragon X9 LTE
- Memory: 4 GB
- Storage: C5: 32 or 64 GB; C5 Pro: 64 GB eMMC 5.1
- Removable storage: microSD up to 256 GB
- SIM: Hybrid Dual SIM (Nano-SIM)
- Battery: Non-removable, Li-Ion 2600 mAh
- Charging: C5: 10 W C5 Pro: 18 W
- Rear camera: 16 MP, f/1.9, AF dual-LED (dual tone) flash, HDR, panorama Video: 1080p @ 30 fps
- Front camera: C5: 8 MP, f/1.9 C5 Pro: 16 MP, f/1.9, 27 mm (wide), 1/3.06", 1 μm Video: 1080p @ 30 fps
- Display: 5.2 in (130 mm) 1080 × 1920 pixels (424 ppi) Super AMOLED
- Sound: Mono speaker
- Connectivity: Wi-Fi :802.11 a/b/g/n (2.4/5 GHz); Wi-Fi Direct; DLNA; GPS/GLONASS/BeiDou; NFC; Bluetooth 4.2; MicroUSB (C5) / USB-C (C5 Pro) (USB 2.0, USB OTG); 3.50 mm (0.138 in) headphone jack
- Model: C5: SM-C5000; C5: SM-C5010, SM-C5018

The Samsung Galaxy C5 and Samsung Galaxy C5 Pro are low-range Android smartphones produced by Samsung Electronics as a part of its Galaxy C series . The Galaxy C5 was unveiled in May 2016 and was released in June of the same year, while the Galaxy C5 Pro was unveiled and released in March 2017.

== Design ==
The front is made of glass (Corning Gorilla Glass 4 on the Galaxy C5 Pro). Both phones feature aluminum bodies.

On the bottom of the smartphones, there is a 3.5 mm audio jack, a microphone, a USB port (microUSB on the Galaxy C5 and USB-C on the Galaxy C5 Pro), and a speaker. On the top, there is a second microphone. On the left, there are the volume buttons, while on the right, there is the power button and a SIM-tray with one slot for a Nano-SIM and one hybrid slot for a Nano-SIM or a microSD card.

On the front, there is the screen with the logo, a front-facing camera, an earpiece speaker, a proximity/ambient light sensor, and an LED indicator (only on the Galaxy C5) above it, and one physical ("home") with an integrated fingerprint scanner and two touch-sensitive ("recent apps" and "back") navigation buttons with LED backlighting below the display. On the back, there is the logo, a rear-facing camera, and a dual-tone LED flash.

The Galaxy C5 came in Dark Gray, Gold, and Pink Gold color options, while the Galaxy C5 Pro came in Lake Blue, Maple Leaf (gold), and Powder Rose (pink gold) color options.

== Specifications ==
=== Hardware ===
The Galaxy C5 is powered by the Qualcomm Snapdragon 617 SoC with the Adreno 405 GPU, while the Galaxy C5 Pro is powered by the more powerful Qualcomm Snapdragon 626 SoC with the Adreno 506 GPU. The Galaxy C5 came with 32 or 64 GB of internal storage depending on configuration, while the Galaxy C5 Pro came only 64 GB. Storage capacity can be expanded via a microSD card by up to 256 GB. Both phones come with 4 GB of RAM.

Both phones are equipped with non-removable lithium-ion batteries with a capacity of 2600 mAh. The Galaxy C5 supports 10 W charging, while the Pro model supports 18 W fast charging.

The smartphones feature 5.2-inch Super AMOLED displays with a Full HD (1920 × 1080 pixels) resolution, a 16:9 aspect ratio and a 424 ppi pixel density.

The phones feature 16 MP rear-facing cameras with an f/1.9 aperture and autofocus. The Galaxy C5 has an 8 MP front-facing while the Galaxy C5 Pro has a 16 MP; both feature an f/1.9 aperture. Both rear and front cameras can record video at up to 1080p at 30 fps.

=== Software ===
The phones come with TouchWiz user interface (Hero UX on the Galaxy C5 and Grace UX on the Pro model) on top of Android 6.0.1 Marshmallow. Later, the smartphones were updated to Samsung Experience 9.0 based on Android 8.0 Oreo. Also, the phones support Samsung Knox and Samsung Pay.

== See also ==
- Samsung Galaxy
- Android (operating system)
- Samsung Galaxy J2
