= Intel Mobile Communications =

- Company type: Subsidiary
- Founded: 2011; 15 years ago
- Fate: Smartphone communications division Acquired by Apple
- Products: Semiconductor products and solutions for wireless communications
- Parent: Intel Corporation

Intel Mobile Communications (IMC), is the mobile research and development division of Intel. It was formed when Intel completed the acquisition of the Wireless Solutions (WLS) division of Infineon early in 2011 for US$1.4 billion. The Infineon subsidiary Comneon was also acquired by Intel and integrated into Intel Mobile Communications. IMC maintained offices in Munich from the Comneon deal under Intel Mobile Communications GmbH. Some other offices in Germany (Dresden, Regensburg, Ulm) were closed in 2015.

IMC develops, manufactures and markets semiconductor products and solutions for wireless communications. It targets the fast-growing market segments of smart phones, connected devices (e.g. tablets, USB dongles, mobile PCs, M2M), and ultra-low-cost/entry phones. Its roadmap is focused on providing cost-effective 2G/3G single-chip platforms for ULC phones up to entry-level smart phones and 3G/4G slim modem and RF solutions for mid-to high-end smart phones and connected devices.

In 2013 due to re-organization, a new organization was formed, named WPRD (Wireless Products Research & Development), which included the former IMC teams, and also the former MWG (Intel legacy Mobile and Wireless Group). This organization was managed by Aicha Evans. In 2016 the name was changed to iCDG (Intel Communications Devices Group). In 2017 Aicha Evans moved and became the chief strategy officer of Intel.

== Products ==
Intel Mobile Communications developed 2G, 3G, 4G and 5G modems under the Intel XMM modems brand.

Intel Mobile Communications developed the Intel Atom Z2000, Z2460, Z2580 system on a chip (SoC) processors.

In 2017, external publications (not confirmed by Intel or Apple) indicated that the Apple iPhone 7 & 8 LTE modems, in most of the units shipped, were based on Intel chips (developed at IMC or iCDG).

== Acquisition by Apple ==
On April 16, 2019, Apple and Qualcomm reached a settlement which included Apple paying an unspecified amount, entering into a six-year patent licensing agreement, and a multi-year agreement for Qualcomm to provide hardware to Apple. Shortly after Intel announced they will exit the 5G smartphone modem business to focus 5G efforts on network infrastructure.

On July 25, 2019, Apple and Intel announced an agreement for Apple to acquire Intel Mobile Communications' smartphone modem business for US$1 billion. Intel will continue to develop modems for non-smartphones such as PCs, IoT devices, and autonomous vehicles.
