= Qualcomm Gobi =

Family of embedded mobile broadband modems

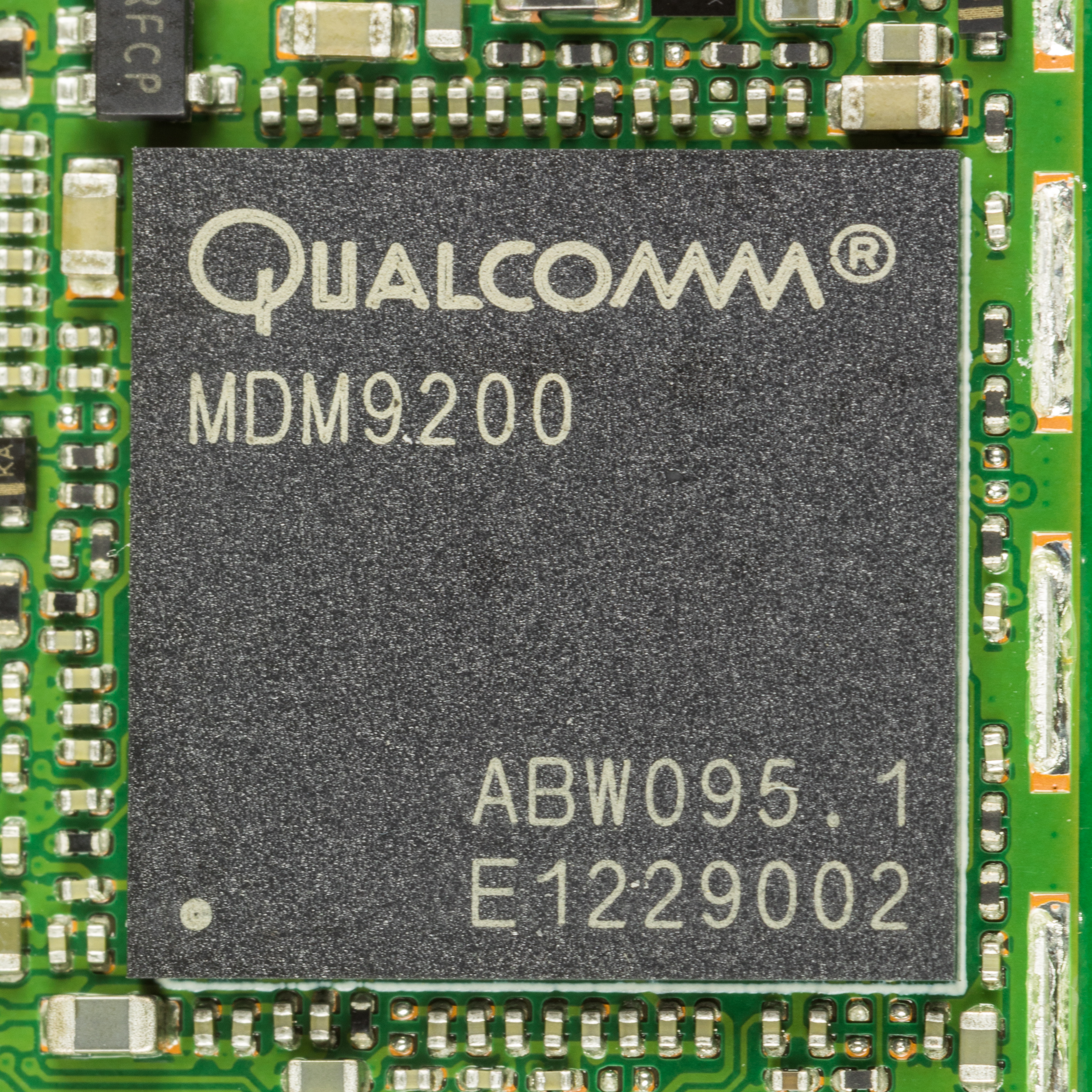
Qualcomm MDM9200

Qualcomm Gobi is a family of embedded mobile broadband modem products by Qualcomm. Gobi technology 2 was designed to allow for any product with the embedded solution to connect to the internet anywhere a wireless carrier provides data coverage. One of the more notable products that contain a Gobi modem is the iPhone 4 for Verizon, which contains a MDM6600, however it does not take advantage of the support for HSPA+.

== History ==
On October 23, 2007, Qualcomm announced the first set of Gobi-enabled chipsets to be commercially available in the second quarter of 2008. The first chip produced by Qualcomm, the MDM1000, gained support from PC manufacturer HP as well as wireless carriers Vodafone and Verizon.

Two years later, on February 11, 2009, Qualcomm announced the second generation of Gobi-enabled chipsets, the MDM2000. The MDM2000 added support for additional frequencies which are prevalent in Japan and rural Europe, improved uplink capabilities and other software upgrades.

The third, and most recent, generation of Gobi-enabled chipsets was announced on March 23, 2010 however this generation consists of a total of 6 different chips which support different ranges of wireless standards and data rates. The reasoning behind the multiple chips was to address additional markets such as USB modems, e-readers, gaming devices and machine to machine commercial applications. Qualcomm also introduced software enhancements for select Mobile Data Modem (MDM) chipsets that enabled “a common Gobi software interface (API) across multiple hardware platforms.”

== Products ==
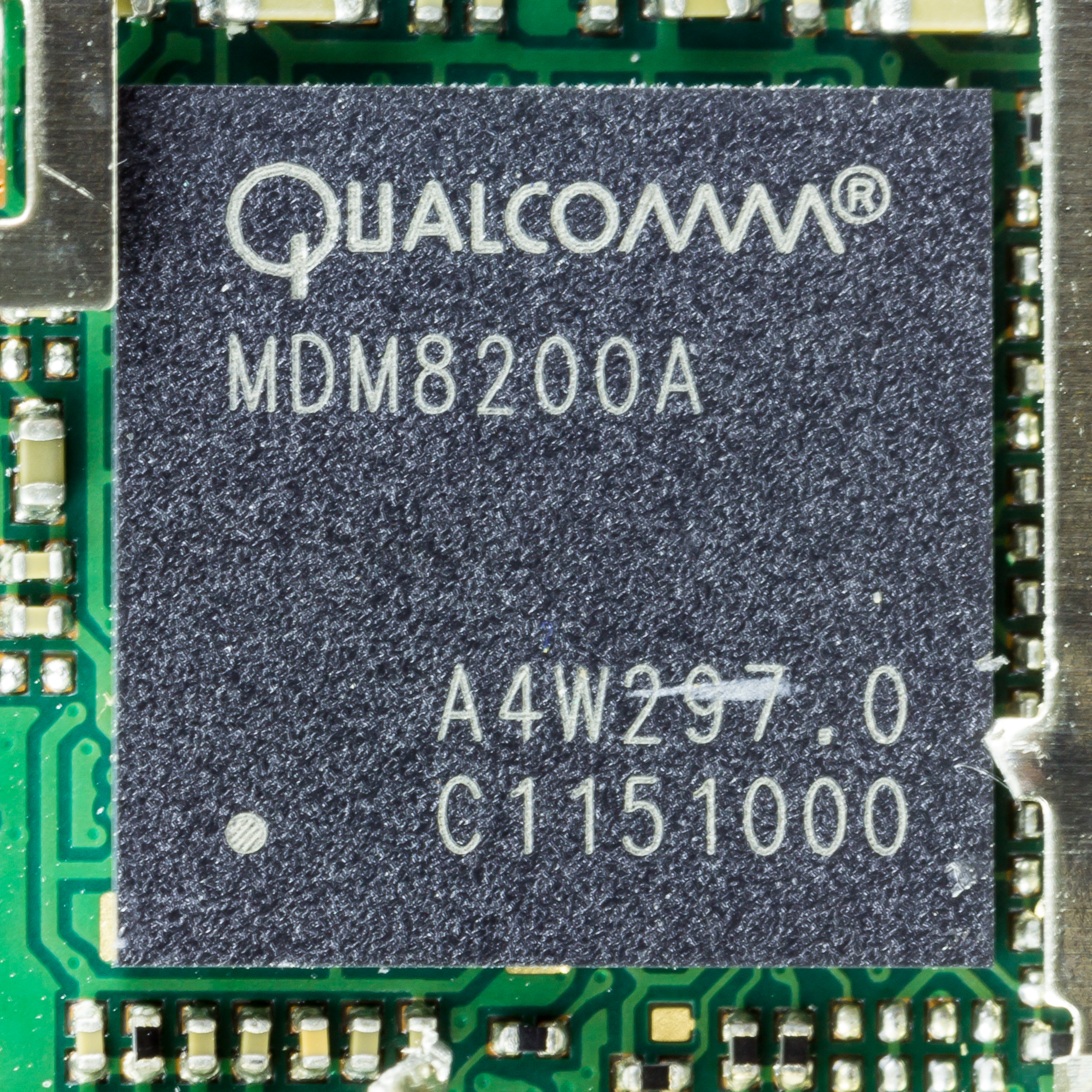
MDM8200A

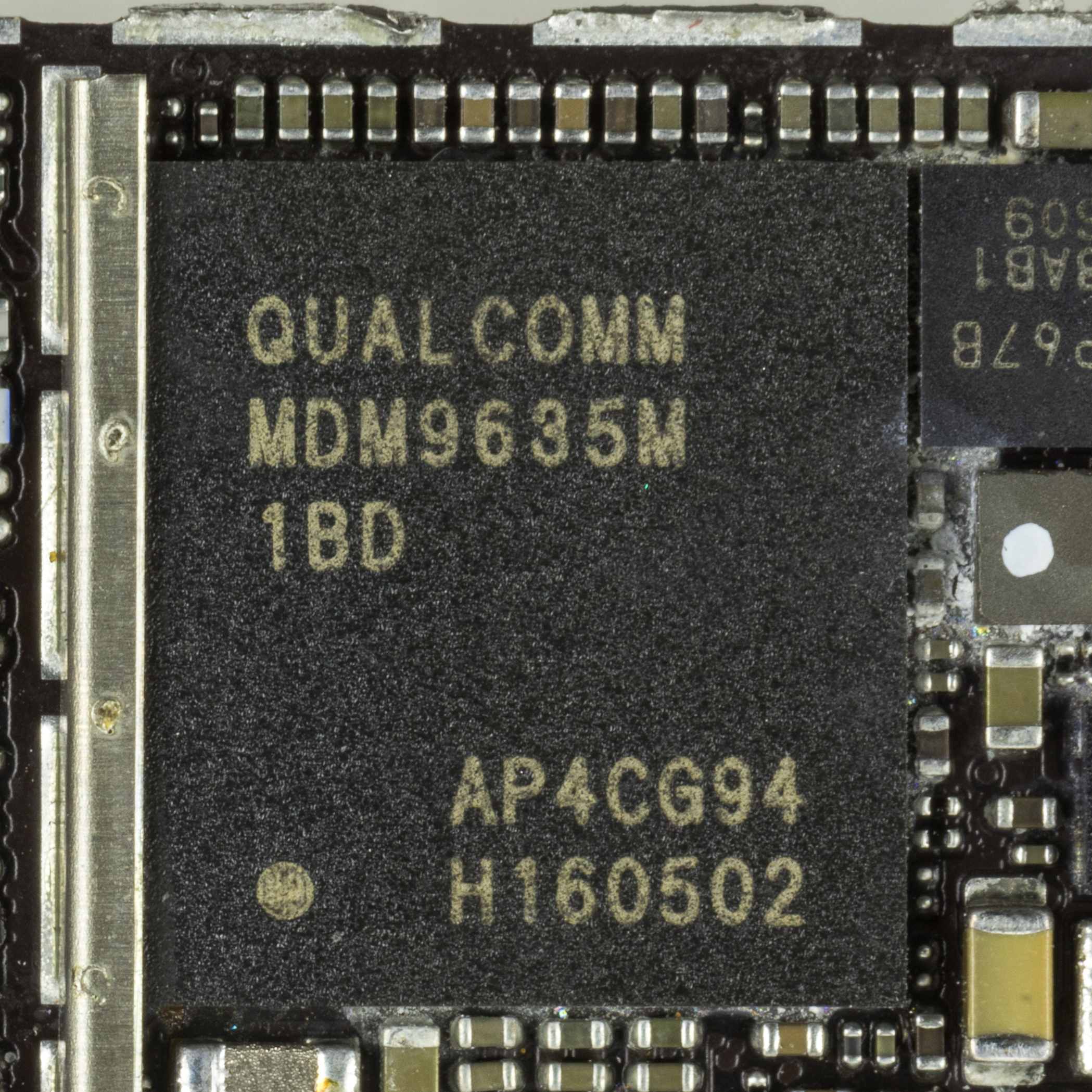
Qualcomm MDM9635M

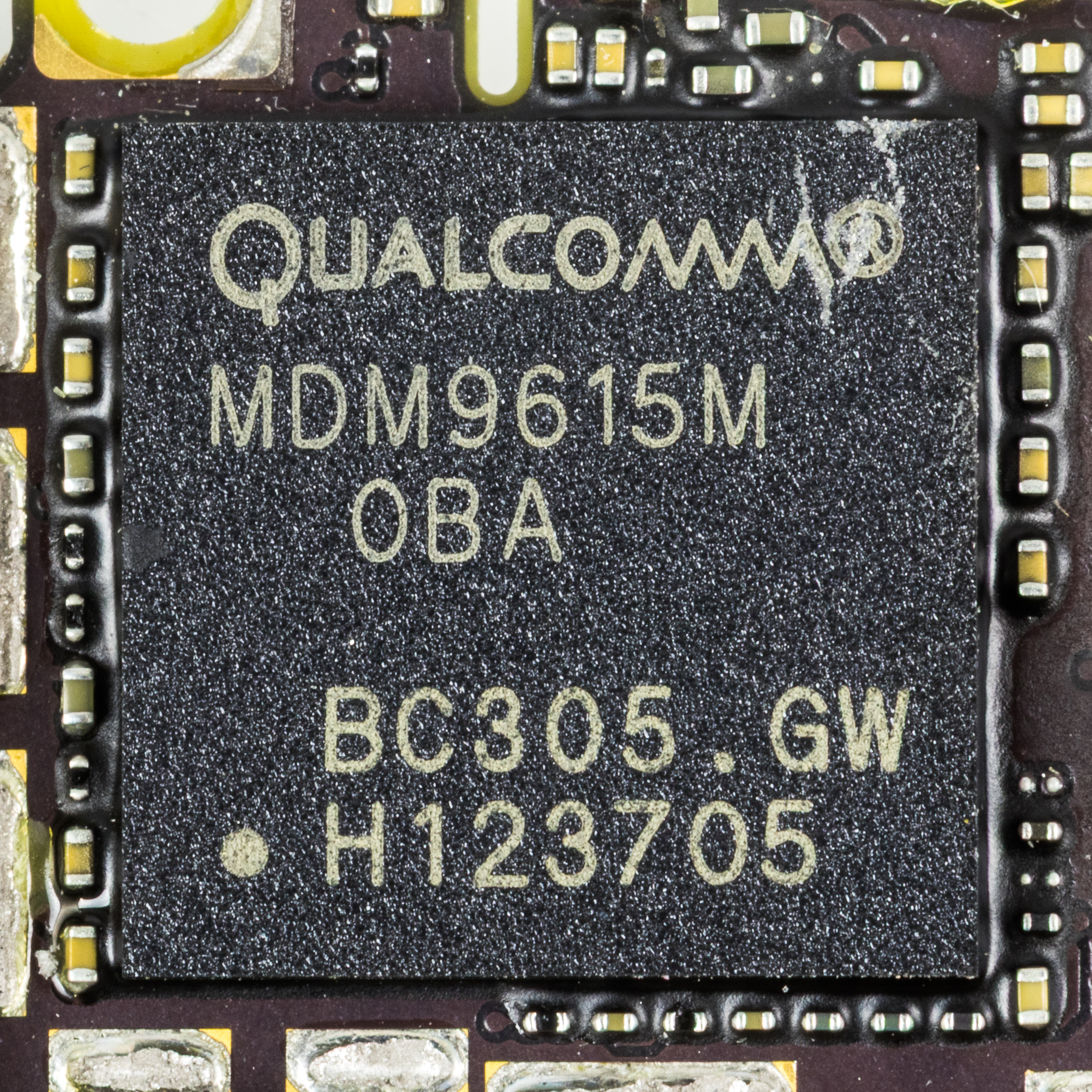
Qualcomm MDM9615M

The main feature of the Gobi modems is their support of multiple wireless standards such as GSM and CDMA. Newer modems also have support for 4G wireless standards such as HSPA+ and LTE, with a notable omission of WiMax. The extensive support of wireless standards allows consumers to choose between multiple carriers based on the modem present in their device. What standard the modem supports and at what rates depends on the chip being used.

Below is a list of Gobi-enabled modem chipsets released by Qualcomm and their features:

MDM1000:

- Multi-mode modem
- EV-DO Rev. A support (CDMA)
  - 800, 1900 MHz
- HSPA support with full backward compatibility with GSM, GPRS and EDGE
  - 850, 1900, 2100 MHz for HSPA
  - 850, 900, 1800, 1900 MHz for GSM/GPRS/EDGE
- Simultaneous GPS functionality

MDM2000:

- All the features of the MDM1000
- Support for HSPA at 800 and 900 MHz
- Improved upload speeds for HSPA
- Improved GPS functionality, including support for Assisted GPS

MDM6200:

- Single-mode modem
- Only supports HSPA+ with data rates of up to 14.4 Mbit/s
- GPS functionality, including support for Assisted GPS

MDM6600:

- Multi-mode modem
- HSPA+ with data rates of up to 14.4 Mbit/s
- CDMA2000 1xEV-DO Rev. A/Rev. B support
- GPS functionality, including support for Assisted GPS

MDM8200A:

- Single-mode modem
- Only supports HSPA+ with data rates of up to 28 Mbit/s
- GPS functionality, including support for Assisted GPS

MDM8220:

- Single-mode modem
- Only supports Dual-Carrier HSPA+ with data rates of up to 42 Mbit/s
- GPS functionality, including support for Assisted GPS

MDM9200:

- Single-mode modem
- 4G(LTE) data rates of up to 100 Mbit/s with full backward compatibility to Dual-Carrier HSPA+
- GPS functionality, including support for Assisted GPS

MDM9600:

- Multi-mode modem
- 4G (LTE) data rates of up to 100 Mbit/s with full backward compatibility to Dual-Carrier HSPA+
- EV-DO Rev. A/Rev. B support
- GPS functionality, including support for Assisted GPS

== Model Names and Real World Names ==
Gobi Model	Manufacturer	Manufacturer Name	Chipset
Gobi 1000	Sierra	MC ?	MDM1000
Gobi 1000	Dell	DW5600	MDM1000
Gobi 1000	HP	un2400	MDM1000
Gobi 2000	Dell	DW5620	MDM2000
Gobi 2000	Sierra	MC ?	MDM2000
Gobi 2000	HP	un2420	MDM2000
Gobi 3000	Sierra	MC8355	MDM6600
Gobi 3000	Dell	DW5630	MDM6600
Gobi 3000	HP	un2430	MDM6600
Gobi 3000	Sierra	MC8705	MDM8200A
Gobi 3000	Sierra	MC8805	MDM8220
Gobi 3000	Dell	DW5570	MDM8220
Gobi 4000	Sierra	MC7710	MDM9200
Gobi 4000	novatel	E371	MDM9200
Gobi 4000	Sierra	MC7304	MDM9215
Gobi 4000	Novatel	E362	MDM9600
Gobi 4000	Sierra	MC7750	MDM9600
Gobi 4000	HP	lt2522	MDM9600
Gobi 5000	Sierra	MC7355	MDM9615
Gobi 5000	Sierra	MC7354	MDM9615
Gobi 5000	Sierra	MC7455	MDM9230

== Awards ==
Mobile Innovation Awards - Mobile Computing – LAPTOP Magazine.

== See also ==
- Comparison of wireless data standards
- Qualcomm Snapdragon
- Qualcomm Snapdragon LTE modem
