= Samsung Galaxy C9 Pro =

2016 Samsung smartphone

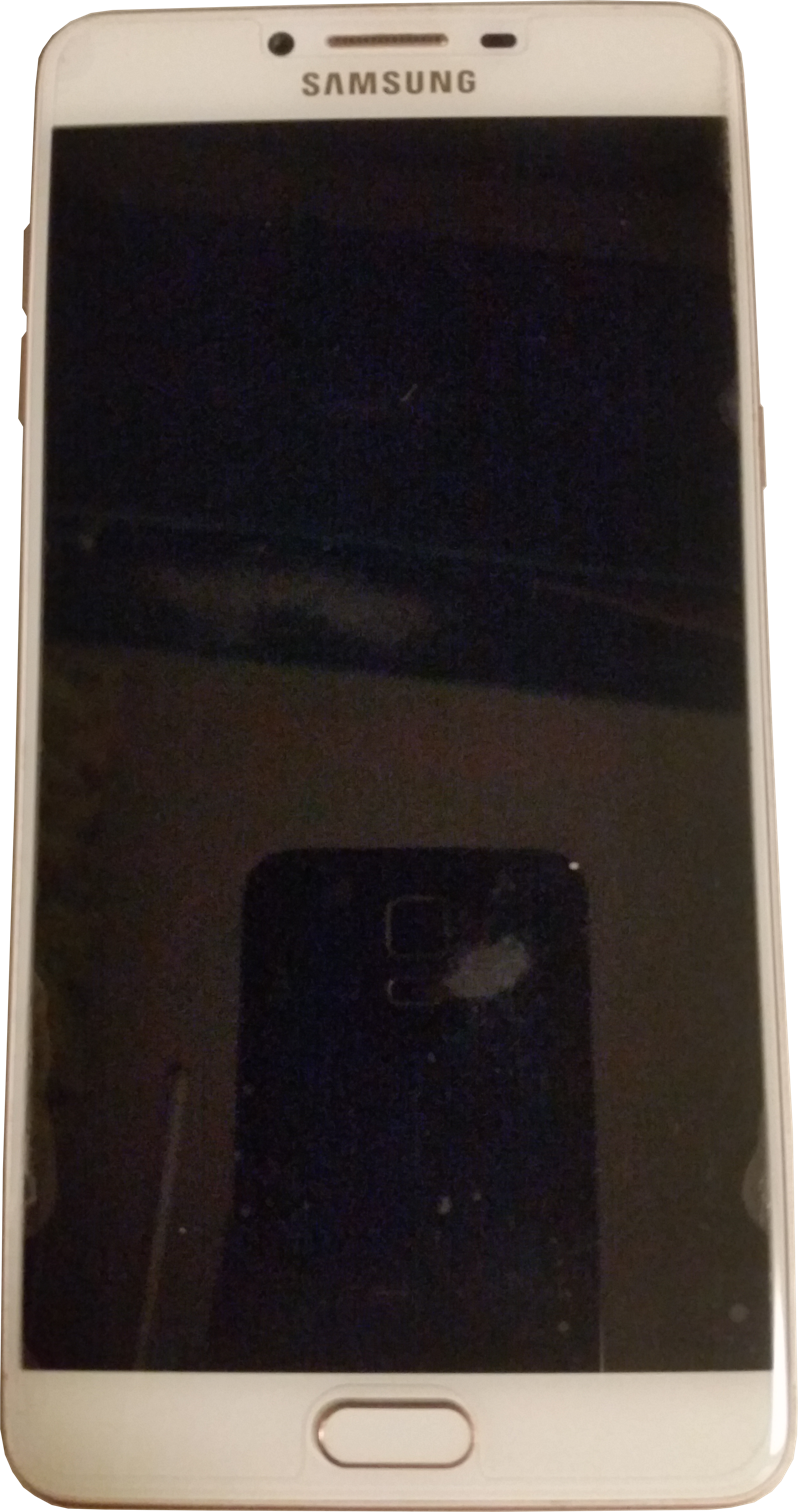
- Brand: Samsung Galaxy
- Manufacturer: Samsung Electronics
- Type: Smartphone
- Series: Galaxy C
- First released: November 2016; 9 years ago
- Related: Samsung Galaxy C5 Pro; Samsung Galaxy C7 Pro
- Compatible networks: 2G; 3G; LTE
- Form factor: Slate
- Dimensions: 162.9 mm × 80.7 mm × 6.9 mm (6.41 in × 3.18 in × 0.27 in)
- Weight: 189 g (6.7 oz)
- Operating system: Original: Android 6.0.1 "Marshmallow"; Current : Android 8.0.0 "Oreo" with Samsung Experience 9.0
- System-on-chip: Qualcomm Snapdragon 653
- CPU: Octa-core (4×1.95 GHz Cortex-A72 & 4×1.4 GHz) Cortex-A53
- GPU: Adreno 510
- Memory: 6 GB RAM
- Storage: 64 GB eMMC 5.1
- Removable storage: microSD, expandable up to 256 GB
- Battery: 4000 mAh (non-removable) (Fast Charging 18 watt)
- Rear camera: 16 MP, f/1.9, 1080p at 30 fps
- Front camera: 16 MP, f/1.9, 1080p at 30 fps
- Display: 1920×1080 1080p Super AMOLED capacitive touchscreen display (16M colors); 6.0 in (150 mm), 367 ppi)
- Sound: Stereo speakers, 3.5 mm (0.14 in) jack, vibration, active noise cancellation
- Connectivity: List: Wi-Fi :802.11 a/b/g/n/ac (2.4/5 GHz); Wi-Fi Direct; Wi-Fi hotspot; DLNA; GPS/GLONASS/BeiDou; NFC; Bluetooth 4.2; USB 3.0 (Micro-B port, USB charging) USB OTG
- Data inputs: Sensors: Accelerometer; Fingerprint scanner; Proximity sensor; Other: Physical sound volume keys
- Model: SM-C9000

The Samsung Galaxy C9 Pro is an Android smartphone produced by Samsung Electronics. It was unveiled and released in November 2016. It is the first Galaxy smartphone to be backed by 6 GB of RAM.

== Design ==
The front is made of Corning Gorilla Glass 4 and the back is made of aluminum.

On the bottom of the smartphones, there is a 3.5 mm audio jack, a USB-C port, a microphone, and a speaker. On the top, there is a second microphone. On the left, there are the volume buttons, while on the right, there is the power button, a Dual SIM-tray, and a microSD-tray.

On the front, there is the screen with the logo, a front-facing camera, an earpiece speaker and a proximity/ambient light sensor above it, and one physical ("home") with an integrated fingerprint scanner and two touch-sensitive ("recent apps" and "back") navigation buttons with LED backlighting below the display. On the back, there is the logo, a rear-facing camera, and a dual-tone LED flash.

The Galaxy C9 Pro came in Black, Gold, and Pink Gold color options.

However, the Galaxy C9 Pro didn't sell as well as two recent phones ( Samsung Galaxy C5 Pro and Samsung Galaxy C7 Pro ) and Samsung finally stopped producing of the Galaxy C9 Pro in 2018/2019 due to few buyers and unpopular.
