= Windows on ARM =

Windows on ARM may refer to:

- Windows Mobile
- Windows Phone
- Windows RT, a deprecated ARM32 version of Windows 8/8.1
- Windows 10 on ARM, Windows 10 compiled for ARM64 devices
- Windows 11 on ARM, Windows 11 compiled for ARM64 devices
- Windows Server on ARM, Windows Server compiled for ARM64 devices
