= Infineon Technologies =

German semiconductor manufacturing company

Infineon Technologies AG

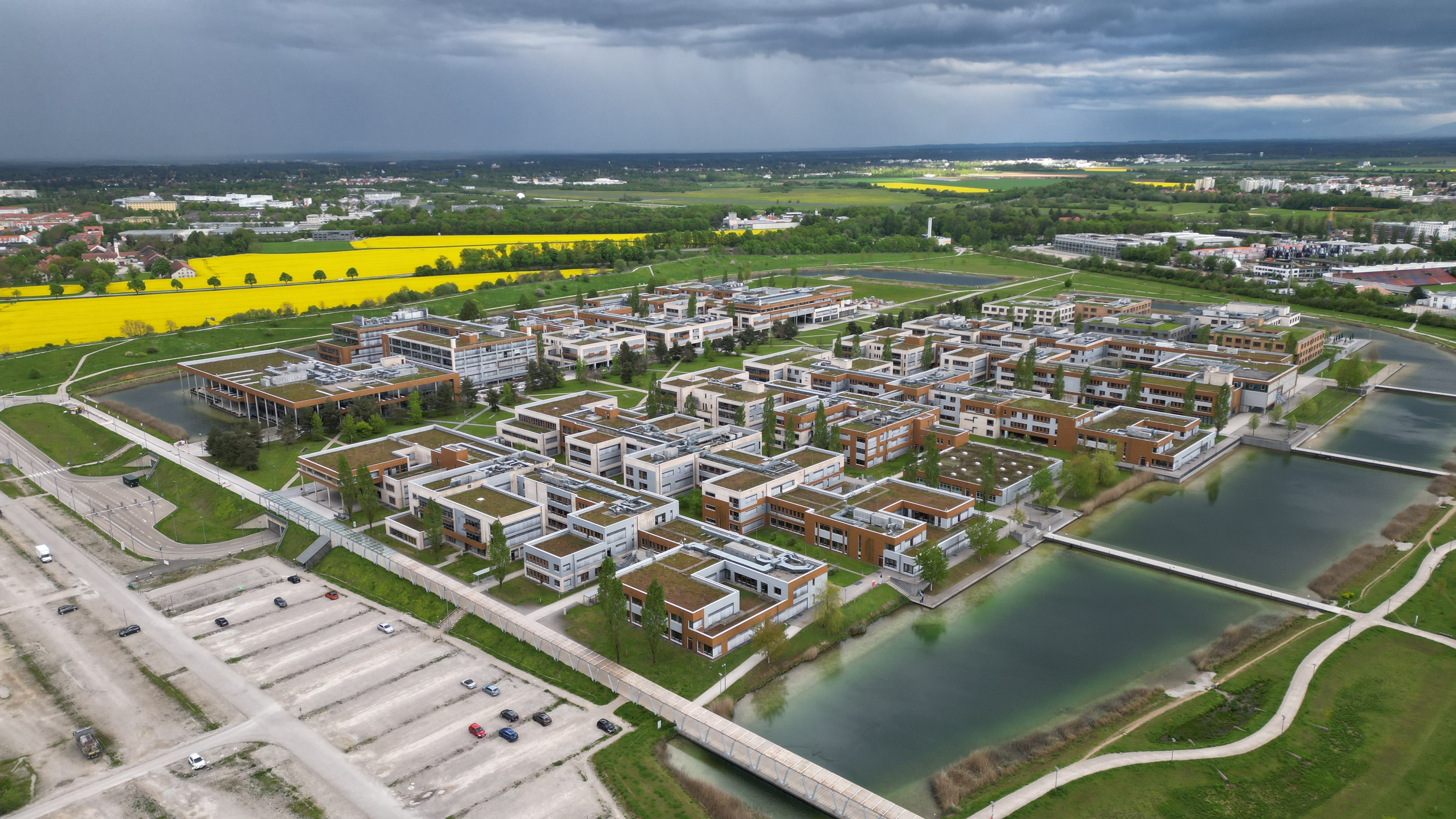
- Headquarters "Campeon" in Neubiberg
- Type: Public (Aktiengesellschaft)
- Traded as: FWB: IFX; DAX component; TecDAX component; EURO STOXX 50 component
- ISIN: DE0006231004
- Industry: Semiconductor
- Founded: 1 April 1999; 27 years ago
- Headquarters: Neubiberg, Germany
- Key people: Jochen Hanebeck (CEO and Chairman of the executive board); Herbert Diess (Chairman of the supervisory board)
- Products: Microcontrollers; Telecommunications; Integrated circuits; Power electronics; Transient-voltage-suppression diodes
- Revenue: ▼€14.662 billion (2025)
- Operating income: ▼€1.515 billion (2025)
- Net income: ▼€1.015 billion (2025)
- Total assets: ▲€30.47 billion (2025)
- Total equity: ▼€17.051 billion (2025)
- Number of employees: 57,077 (2025)
- Divisions: Automotive; Power Systems; Edge Systems
- Website: www.infineon.com

Infineon Technologies AG is a German company which designs and manufactures semiconductor devices. It provides parts for automotive, power and security systems. In 2023, Infineon was Germany's largest chip manufacturer, and had roughly 57,000 employees in 2025.

Infineon was spun-off from Siemens, a German engineering conglomerate in April 1999; one year later, it underwent the largest initial public offering (IPO) for a tech company to date despite Siemens retaining a 74 percent stake in the business. By 2026, Infineon's operations had been restructured into three distinct business areas: Automotive (ATV), Power Systems (PS) and Edge Systems (ES). According to Handelsblatt, Infineon is Germany’s largest semiconductor manufacturer and ranks among the top ten semiconductor manufacturers worldwide.

== History ==
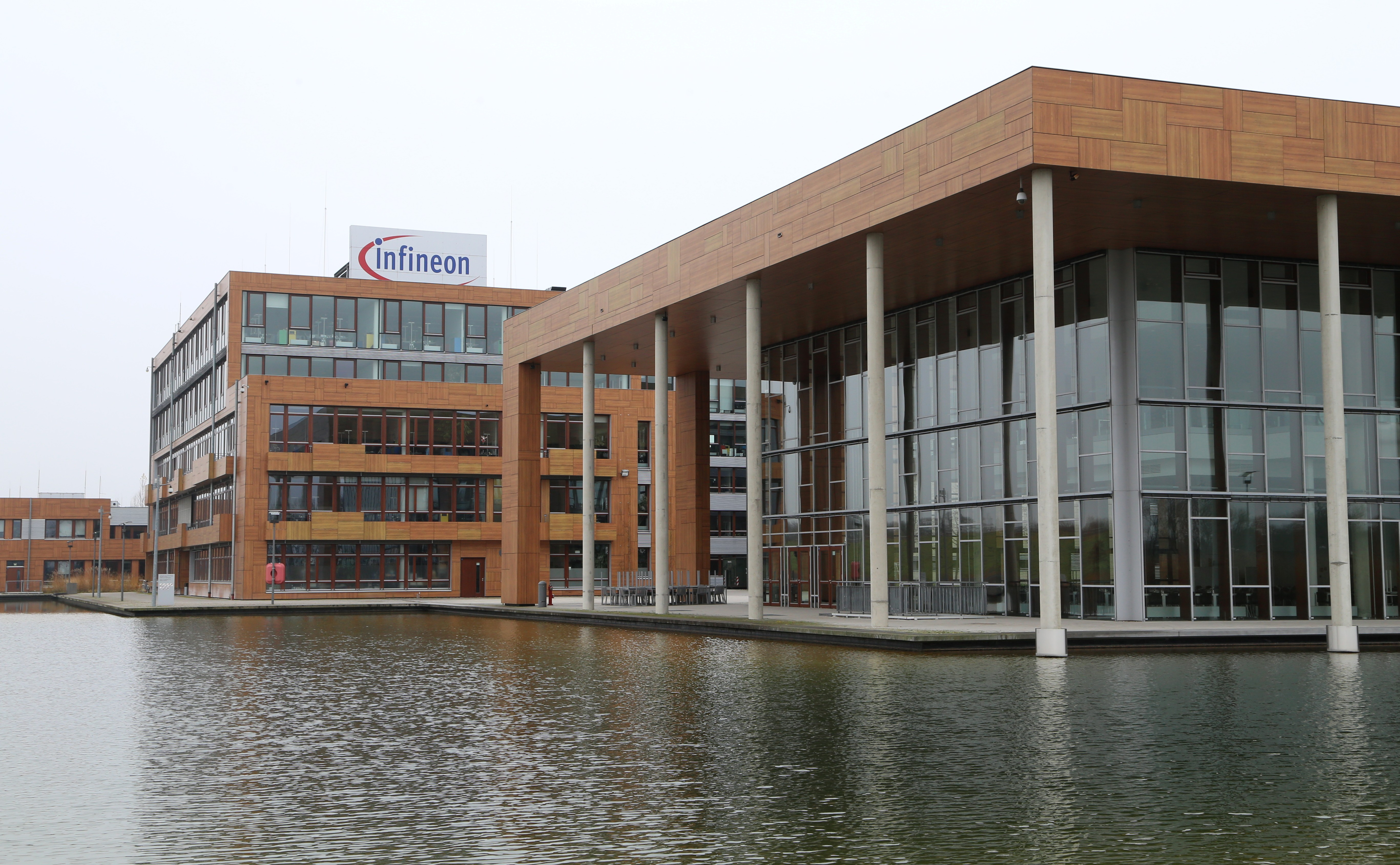
Campeon: Infineon's headquarters in Neubiberg near Munich

Infineon Technologies was created as the result of a spin-off from the German engineering firm Siemens. The spin-off, which formally took place on 1 April 1999, was claimed to be the largest high-tech spin-off in Europe. It had been Siemens semiconductor division, which had experienced considerable growth during the 1990s, rising from the 19th largest semiconductor manufacturer in the world in 1993 to the tenth largest in 1999. In March 2000, Infineon's initial public offering (IPO) on both the Frankfurt and New York stock exchanges was met with strong institutional demand that led to the offering being 33 times over subscribed. Infineon raised in excess of $5 billion, despite Siemens having retained a 74 percent stake in the firm, making it the world's largest tech IPO at the time.

Initially, Infineon's main business was the memory market, such as DRAM; this sector proved to be intensely competitive as well as volatile. Seeking to expand its presence in this market, in January 2004, Infineon purchased the Taiwanese chip designer ADMtek in exchange for $100 million; it was the company's first acquisition in Asia. Shortly thereafter, a sweeping restructuring of Infineon was conducted that reoriented the firm around the core businesses of automotive and industrial semiconductors; accordingly, Infineon's memory division was carved out as Qimonda AG, which remained a subsidiary of Infineon. At its height, Qimonda employed about 13,500 people and had its own listing on the New York Stock Exchange. However, following a major downturn in chip prices amid the Great Recession, Qimonda filed for bankruptcy with the district court in Munich in January 2009.

In July 2009, Infineon sold Wireline Communications to Golden Gate Capital to raise €250 million, resulting in the creation of Lantiq. Two years later, Infineon also sold off its wireless business segment to Intel in exchange for US$1.4 billion; leading to the creation of Intel Mobile Communications (IMC). In August 2014, Infineon agreed to buy the International Rectifier Corporation (IR) for roughly US$3 billion, which was paid one-third by cash and two-thirds by credit line; this acquisition was officially closed on 13 January 2015.

In July 2015, it was reported that Infineon was looking to sell off its 200mm wafer fab in Newport, Wales; it was ultimately sold to Neptune 6 in September 2017. In July 2016, Infineon agreed to buy Wolfspeed, a company in North Carolina, from Cree Inc. in exchange for US$850 million in cash, although this deal was eventually stopped due to U.S. security concerns. That same year, Infineon acquired the Dutch firm Innoluce, a specialist in MEMS and Lidar systems for use in autonomous cars. During 2017, it joined the recently-created 5G Automotive Association. In March 2018, Infineon sold its RF Power Business Unit to the US firm Cree Inc. in exchange for €345 million. In May 2018, Infineon announced what was at the time the largest single investment in its history: €1.6 billion for a semiconductor plant and research centre at its site in Villach, Austria, with construction completed in September 2021. Infineon announced in June 2019 that it would acquire Cypress Semiconductor for $9.4 billion. The acquisition, completed in April 2020, was the largest in Infineon's history. Following its acquisition, Infineon moved up to eighth place among the world’s largest semiconductor manufacturers.

Throughout the late 2010s and early 2020s, Infineon expanded its manufacturing capacity. During the early 2020s, the firm promoted its plans to build two additional plants in Dresden, employing 3000 staff, at a cost of €5 billion and requested a subsidy of €920 million from the German government towards its construction; in February 2025, this was approved by the European Commission, having been financed through the €43 billion European Chips Act. A new chip fab at the Dresden site opened in February 2026, which is considered the largest factory for semiconductors in the world. In 2023, Infineon opened a semiconductor development centre in Hanoi, Vietnam, for the verification of automotive microcontrollers and for test and adaptation processes for integrated analogue and digital circuits.

In May 2023, Infineon acquired the "tiny machine learning" company Imagimob, a Stockholm, Sweden–based company with a platform for development and deployment of AI applications. That same year, Infineon also acquired the Canadian firm GaN Systems, headquartered in Ottawa, Canada, for $830 million, expanding its business in gallium nitride power semiconductors. Also in 2023, Infineon and United Microelectronics Corporation (UMC) signed a long-term cooperation agreement to expand production capacity for automotive microcontrollers using embedded non-volatile memory technology in UMC's 40-nanometre process. In 2023, Infineon announced to invest up to €5 billion in Kulim, Malaysia. In April 2025, Infineon bought Marvell Technology's automotive ethernet division in exchange for $2.5 billion.

In 2026, Infineon agreed to acquire the non-optical analogue and mixed-signal sensor business of Ams-Osram for €570 million in order to expand its sensor business. That same year, Infineon joined several European pilot-line projects for the development of quantum technologies—among them the projects Champ-ion, Supreme and Spins—intended to accelerate the transfer of quantum research into industrial manufacturing.

== Business divisions ==
Infineon markets semiconductors and systems for automotive, industrial, and multimarket sectors, as well as chip card and security products. As of 2026, Infineon consists of three divisions.

=== Automotive (ATV) ===
Infineon provides semiconductor products for use in powertrains (engine and transmission control), comfort electronics (e.g., steering, shock absorbers, air conditioning), as well as in safety systems (ABS, airbags, ESP). The products include microcontrollers, power semiconductors, and sensors. In 2025, the Automotive segment accounted for around 50% of the Group’s revenue.

=== Power Systems (PS) ===
The Power Systems division combines the industrial business of the company (named IPC until 2023, then Green Industrial Power) with the power management business of the former Power & Sensor Systems division. It includes power semiconductors and modules which are used for generation, transmission and consumption of electrical energy. Its application areas include control of electric drives for industrial applications and household appliances, modules for renewable energy production, conversion and transmission, including charging infrastructure for electric vehicles. They are used in industrial equipment, photovoltaic and wind power systems, high-speed trains, underground and tram systems, data centres, vehicles with combustion, hybrid and electric drives, power transmission systems, and charging stations for electric vehicles. Infineon also develops packaging systems for silicon carbide power semiconductors used in on-board chargers, photovoltaic systems, energy-storage systems and data centres. The division also comprises semiconductor components for efficient power management, which find application in lighting management systems and LED lighting, power supplies for servers, PCs, notebooks and consumer electronics, custom devices for peripheral devices and game consoles.

=== Edge Systems (ES) ===
The Edge Systems division combines the former Connected Secure Systems business with the sensor and high-frequency business of the former Power & Sensor Systems division. It provides microcontrollers for mobile phone SIM cards, security chips for payment and access cards, and chip-based systems for official documents such as passports and identity cards. Infineon delivers a significant number of chips for the German identity card. The division also develops semiconductor technology for pay television, Trusted Computing and Near-field communication (NFC), and advances wireless technologies such as ultra-wideband (UWB) for localisation and data transmission. Its products also include high-frequency components having a protective function for communication and tuner systems and silicon MEMS microphones. It also includes mixed-signal sensor systems used in medical imaging and for precise position, angle and speed measurement, and the development of semiconductor technologies for quantum systems.

== Corporate affairs ==
=== Finances ===
	2016	2017	2018	2019	2020	2021	2022	2023	2024	2025
Total revenue (€ bn)	6.5	7.1	7.6	8.0	8.6	11.1	14.2	16.3	15.0	14.7
Net profit (€ bn)	0.7	0.8	1.1	0.9	0.4	1.2	2.2	3.1	1.8	1.0
Total assets (€ bn)	9.1	10.0	10.9	13.8	22.8	24.1	26.9	28.4	29.3	31.0
Total equity (€ bn)	5.0	5.6	6.5	8.6	9.0	10.1	13.7	15.8	16.0	16.4
Employees	36,300	37,480	40,100	41,418	46,665	50,280	56,194	58,590	58,065	57,077

=== Corporate structure ===
Infineon Technologies AG is headquartered in Neubiberg, in the district of Munich. Its management board consists of Jochen Hanebeck as chief executive officer, Sven Schneider as chief financial officer, Alexander Gorski as chief operations officer, Elke Reichart as chief digital and sustainability officer, and Andreas Urschitz as chief marketing officer. In the 2025 financial year, Infineon had 57,077 employees and generated revenue of €14.662 billion. Biggest shareholders as of June 2026 are BlackRock (6.83%), Norges Bank (3.04%) and Amundi (3.01%).

Infineon is listed in the DAX index of the Frankfurt Stock Exchange.

=== Locations and subsidiaries ===
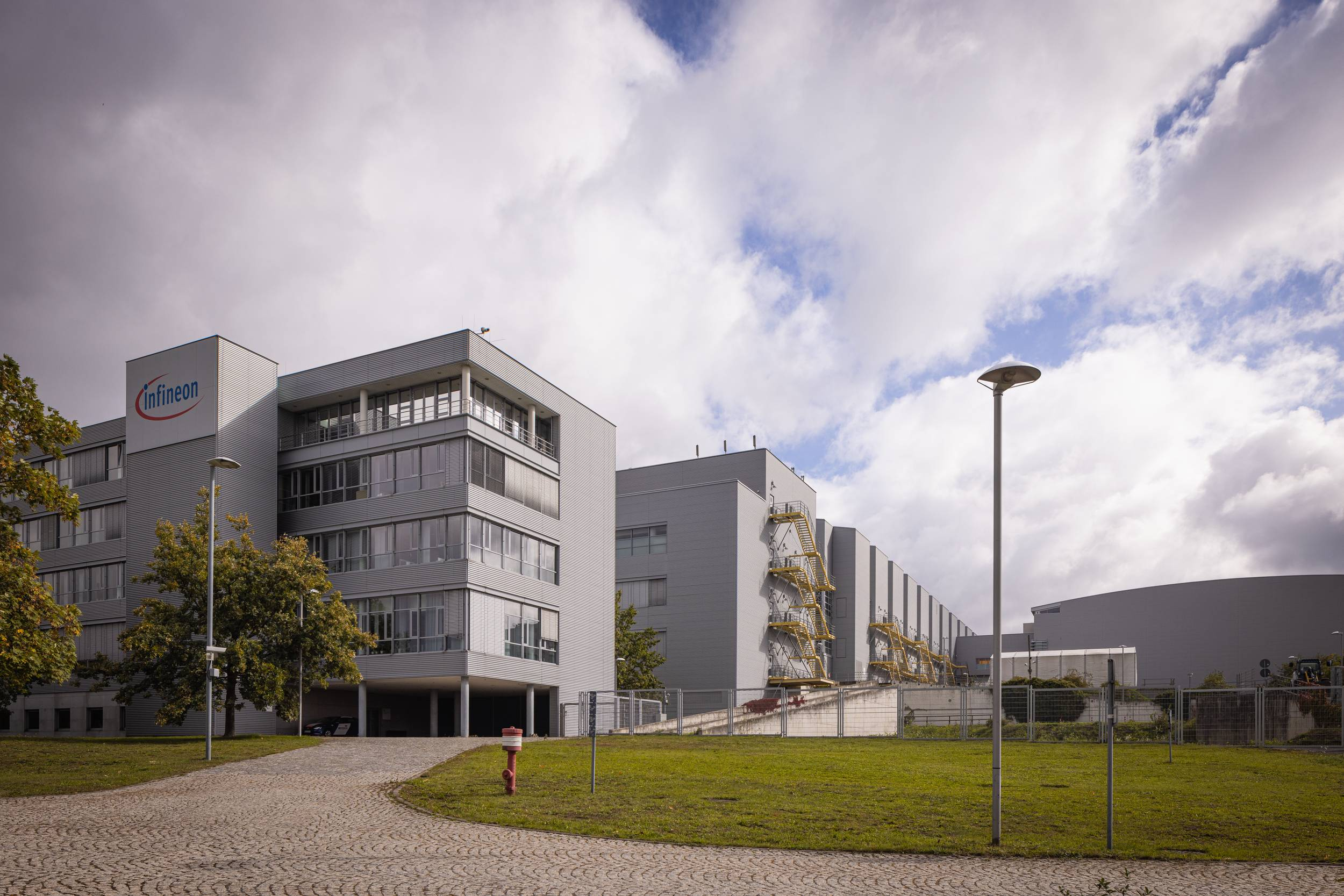
Infineon's site in Dresden

Infineon has a number of facilities in Europe, one in Dresden, Germany. Infineon's high power segment is in Warstein, Germany; Villach, Graz and Linz in Austria; Cegléd in Hungary; and Italy. It also operates R&D centers in France, Singapore, Romania, Taiwan, U.K., Ireland, and India, as well as fabrication units in Malaysia, Singapore, Indonesia, China, Hungary, and USA, including in El Segundo and Austin, among others. There is a Shared Service Center in Porto, Portugal.

== Controversy and litigation ==
In 2004–2005, an investigation was carried out into a conspiracy to fix the price of DRAM between 1999 and 2002 that damaged competition and raised PC prices. In December 2004, Infineon agreed to enter a guilty plea, cooperate with the US government's investigation, and pay a $160 million fine over its role in the conspiracy. During mid 2005, Infineon appointed the auditing specialist Ernst & Young to review internal monitoring and information systems after the resignation of an executive over alleged bribery in the sponsoring of motor-sport events.

In 2010, legal action was filed by the insolvency administrator overseeing the insolvent Qimonda over Infineon's alleged role in its collapse; this was concluded in a settlement of €753.5 million in 2024.

In September 2014, the European Commission found that Infineon, Renesas and other smart card chip manufacturers had unlawfully coordinated their pricing between 2003 and 2005.

In October 2017, it was reported that a code library developed by Infineon contained a ROCA vulnerability. Due to it being in widespread use in security products such as smartcards and TPMs (Trusted Platform Modules), enabled private keys to be inferred from public keys. As a result, all systems depending upon the privacy of such keys were vulnerable to compromise, such as identity theft or spoofing. Affected systems include 750,000 Estonian identity cards, 300,000 Slovak identity cards, and computers that use Microsoft BitLocker drive encryption in conjunction with an affected TPM. Immediately after the disclosure, Microsoft released a patch via Windows Update that works around the flaw.
