= List of Qualcomm Snapdragon modems =

The Qualcomm Snapdragon modems are a series of 4G LTE, LTE Advanced, LTE Advanced Pro, and 5G NR modems found in many phones, tablets, laptops, watches and even cars.

== Qualcomm Gobi ==
The Qualcomm Gobi series was their modem branding before they switched to the X-series.

| Modem class | 3G | | | 3G+/4G | | 4G LTE | LTE.5G |
|---|---|---|---|---|---|---|---|
| Peak data rate (Mbit/s) | 3.6 | 14.4 | 28.8 | 42 | 84 | 100 | 150 |
| Modems | MDM6270 | MDM6200 MDM6600 | MDM8200A | MDM8215 MDM8220 | MDM8225 | MDM9200 MDM9215 MDM9600 MDM9615 | MDM9225 MDM9625 |

== Qualcomm 4G X-series ==
The Qualcomm Snapdragon X-series modems are the current line-up of 4G LTE modems.

=== Snapdragon X5 LTE ===
- LTE Technology: LTE FDD, Cellular Technology: WCDMA (3C-HSDPA, DC-HSUPA), WCDMA (DC-HSDPA, HSUPA), WCDMA (DC-HSDPA, DC-HSUPA), TD-SCDMA, CDMA 1x, EV-DO, GSM/EDGE
- Downlink LTE: LTE Category 4 (150 Mbit/s). 2×20 MHz carrier aggregation. Up to 64 QAM
- Uplink LTE: LTE Category 4 (50 Mbit/s). 1×20 MHz carrier aggregation. Up to 16 QAM
- Chipsets: Snapdragon X5 LTE Modem, Snapdragon 616 processor, Snapdragon 415 processor, Snapdragon 412 processor and Snapdragon 212 processor

=== Snapdragon X6 LTE ===
- LTE Technology: LTE FDD, LTE TDD, LTE Broadcast
- Cellular Technology: WCDMA (DC-HSDPA, DC-HSUPA), TD-SCDMA, CDMA 1x, EV-DO, GSM/EDGE
- Downlink LTE: LTE Category 4 (150 Mbit/s). 2×20 MHz carrier aggregation. Up to 64 QAM
- Uplink LTE: LTE Category 5 (75 Mbit/s). 1×20 MHz carrier aggregation. Up to 64 QAM
- Chipsets: Snapdragon 430 processor, Snapdragon 429 Mobile Platform and Snapdragon 439 Mobile Platform

=== Snapdragon X7 LTE ===
- LTE Technology: LTE FDD, LTE TDD, LTE Broadcast
- Cellular Technology: WCDMA (3C-HSDPA, DC-HSUPA), WCDMA (DC-HSDPA, HSUPA), WCDMA (DC-HSDPA, DC-HSUPA), TD-SCDMA, CDMA 1x, EV-DO, GSM/EDGE
- Downlink LTE: LTE Category 6 (300 Mbit/s). 2×20 MHz carrier aggregation. Up to 64 QAM
- Uplink LTE: LTE Category 4 (50 Mbit/s). 1×20 MHz carrier aggregation. Up to 16 QAM
- Chipsets: Snapdragon X7 LTE Modem

The first Qualcomm modem with PCIe inter-chip link type.

=== Snapdragon X8 LTE ===
- LTE Technology: LTE FDD, LTE TDD, LTE Broadcast
- Cellular Technology: WCDMA (DB-DC-HSDPA, DC-HSUPA), TD-SCDMA, CDMA 1x, EV-DO, GSM/EDGE
- Downlink LTE: LTE Category 6 (300 Mbit/s). 2×20 MHz carrier aggregation. Up to 64 QAM
- Uplink LTE: LTE Category 6 (100 Mbit/s). 2×20 MHz carrier aggregation. Up to 16 QAM
- Chipsets: Snapdragon 617 processor, Snapdragon 650 processor and Snapdragon 652 processor

=== Snapdragon X9 LTE ===
- LTE Technology: LTE FDD, LTE TDD, LTE Broadcast
- Cellular Technology: WCDMA (DB-DC-HSDPA, DC-HSUPA), TD-SCDMA, CDMA 1x, EV-DO, GSM/EDGE
- Downlink LTE: LTE Category 7 (300 Mbit/s). 2×20 MHz carrier aggregation. Up to 64 QAM
- Uplink LTE: LTE Category 13 (150 Mbit/s). 2×20 MHz carrier aggregation. Up to 64 QAM
- Chipsets: Snapdragon 625 processor, Snapdragon 626 processor, Snapdragon 435 processor, Snapdragon 427 processor, Snapdragon 450 Mobile Platform and Snapdragon 653 Mobile Platform

=== Snapdragon X10 LTE ===
- LTE Technology: LTE FDD, LTE TDD, LTE Broadcast
- Cellular Technology: WCDMA (DB-DC-HSDPA, DC-HSUPA), TD-SCDMA, CDMA 1x, EV-DO, GSM/EDGE
- Downlink LTE: LTE Category 9 (450 Mbit/s). 3×20 MHz carrier aggregation. Up to 64 QAM
- Uplink LTE: LTE Category 4 (50 Mbit/s). 1×20 MHz carrier aggregation. Up to 16 QAM
- Chipsets: Snapdragon 810 processor and Snapdragon 808 processor

=== Snapdragon X12 LTE ===
- LTE Technology: LTE FDD, LTE TDD, LTE-U, LWA, LTE Broadcast, Voice over LTE
- Cellular Technology: WCDMA (DB-DC-HSDPA, DC-HSUPA), TD-SCDMA, CDMA 1x, EV-DO, GSM/EDGE
- Downlink LTE: LTE Category 12 (600 Mbit/s). 3×20 MHz carrier aggregation. Maximum 6 spatial streams. Up to 256 QAM. Up to 4×4 MIMO on one carrier
- Uplink LTE: LTE Category 13 (150 Mbit/s). 2×20 MHz carrier aggregation. Up to 64 QAM
- Samsung 14 nm LPP process
- Chipsets: Snapdragon X12 LTE Modem, Snapdragon 820/821 processor, Snapdragon 660 Mobile Platform, Snapdragon 630 Mobile Platform, Snapdragon 636 Mobile Platform, Snapdragon 670 Mobile Platform, Snapdragon 675 Mobile Platform, Snapdragon 665 Mobile Platform, Snapdragon 678 Mobile Platform

=== Snapdragon X15 LTE ===
- LTE Technology: LTE FDD, LTE TDD, LAA, LTE Broadcast, Voice over LTE
- Cellular Technology: WCDMA (DB-DC-HSDPA, DC-HSUPA), TD-SCDMA, CDMA 1x, EV-DO, GSM/EDGE
- Downlink LTE: LTE Category 15 (800 Mbit/s). 3×20 MHz carrier aggregation. Up to 256 QAM. Up to 4×4 MIMO on two carriers
- Uplink LTE: LTE Category 13 (150 Mbit/s). 2×20 MHz carrier aggregation. Up to 64 QAM
- Chipsets: Snapdragon X15 LTE Modem, Snapdragon 732G, Snapdragon 730(G), Snapdragon 720G, Snapdragon 712, Snapdragon 710

=== Snapdragon X16 LTE ===
- LTE Technology: LTE FDD, LTE TDD, LAA, LTE Broadcast, Voice over LTE
- Cellular Technology: WCDMA (DB-DC-HSDPA, DC-HSUPA), TD-SCDMA, CDMA 1x, EV-DO, GSM/EDGE
- Downlink LTE: LTE Category 16 (1,000 Mbit/s). 4×20 MHz carrier aggregation. Maximum 10 spatial streams. Up to 256 QAM. Up to 4×4 MIMO on two carriers
- Uplink LTE: LTE Category 13 (150 Mbit/s). 2×20 MHz carrier aggregation. Up to 64 QAM
- Chipsets: Snapdragon X16 LTE Modem, Snapdragon 835 processor

=== Snapdragon X20 LTE ===
- LTE Technology: LTE FDD, LTE TDD including CBRS support, LAA, LTE Broadcast, Voice over LTE
- Cellular Technology: WCDMA (DB-DC-HSDPA, DC-HSUPA), TD-SCDMA, CDMA 1x, EV-DO, GSM/EDGE
- Downlink LTE: LTE Category 18 (1,200 Mbit/s). 5×20 MHz carrier aggregation. Maximum 12 spatial streams. Up to 256 QAM. Up to 4×4 MIMO on three carriers
- Uplink LTE: LTE Category 13 (150 Mbit/s). 2×20 MHz carrier aggregation. Up to 64 QAM
- Samsung 10 nm LPE process
- Chipsets: Snapdragon X20 LTE Modem, Snapdragon 845 Mobile Platform

=== Snapdragon X24 LTE ===
- LTE Technology: LTE FDD, LTE TDD including CBRS support, LAA, LTE Broadcast, Voice over LTE
- Cellular Technology: WCDMA (DB-DC-HSDPA, DC-HSUPA), TD-SCDMA, CDMA 1x, EV-DO, GSM/EDGE
- Downlink LTE: LTE Category 20 (2,000 Mbit/s). 7×20 MHz carrier aggregation. Maximum 20 spatial streams. Up to 256 QAM. Up to 4×4 MIMO on five carriers, Full-Dimension MIMO (FD-MIMO)
- Uplink LTE: LTE Category 13 (316 Mbit/s). 3×20 MHz carrier aggregation. Up to 256 QAM
- TSMC 7 nm FinFET process
- Chipsets: Snapdragon X24 LTE Modem, Snapdragon 855 Mobile Platform, Snapdragon 8cx

=== Table of Snapdragon 4G X-series modems ===
| Modem Class | X5 | X6 | X7 | X8 | X9 | X10 | X11 | X12 | X15 | X16 | X20 | X24 |
|---|---|---|---|---|---|---|---|---|---|---|---|---|
| LTE Category (down / up) | 4 | 4 / 5 | 6 | 7 | 7 / 13 | 9 | 13 | 12 / 13 | 15 / 13 | 16 / 13 | 18 / 13 | 20 |
| Peak LTE speeds down (Mbit/s) Peak LTE speed up (Mbit/s) | 150 | | 300 | | | 450 | 390 | 600 | 800 | 1,000 | 1,200 | 2,000 |
| Peak LTE speeds down (Mbit/s) Peak LTE speed up (Mbit/s) | 50 | 75 | 50 | 100 | 150 | 50 | 150 | | | | | 316 |
| LTE Class | LTE (4G) | | LTE Advanced (4G+) | | | | | | | | LTE Advanced Pro (4.5G) | |
| Snapdragon SoCs | 210, 212, 215, 410, 412, 415, 610, 615, 616 | 425, 429, 430, 439 | - | 617, 650, 652 (integrated) | 427, 435, 450, 625, 626, 632, 653 (integrated) | 808, 810 (integrated) | 460, 662, 680, 685 (integrated) | 630, 636, 660, 665, 670, 675, 678, 820, 821 (integrated) | 710, 712, 720G, 730(G), 732G, 7c, 7c Gen 2 (integrated) | 835 (integrated) | 845, 850 (integrated) | 855/855+/860, 8c, 8cx, 8cx Gen 2, SQ1, SQ2 (integrated) |
| Modems | MDM9628 MDM9625 MDM9225 MDM9320 MDM9207 | - | MDM9635M MDM9235M MDM9630 MDM9330 MDM9230 | - | | | | MDM9645 MDM9640 MDM9340 MDM9245 MDM9240 | MDM9250 | MDM9x55 | MDM9x65 | SDX24 |

== Qualcomm 5G X-series ==
=== Snapdragon X50 5G ===
- 5G Technology: 5G NR NSA
- 5G Spectrum: mmWave, sub-6 GHz
- 5G Modes: TDD, NSA (non-standalone)
- 5G mmWave specs: 800 MHz bandwidth, 8 carriers, 2×2 MIMO
- 5G sub-6 GHz specs: 100 MHz bandwidth, 4×4 MIMO
- mmWave Features: Dual-layer polarization in downlink and uplink, Beam forming, Beam steering, Beam tracking
- 5G Peak Download Speed: 5,000 Mbit/s
- Samsung 10 nm FinFET process

=== Snapdragon X55 5G ===
- For iPhone 12, iPhone 12 Mini, and iPhone 12 Pro series
- 5G Technology: 5G NR FDD, 5G NR TDD, SA, NSA
- 5G Spectrum: mmWave, sub-6 GHz, 5G/4G spectrum sharing
- 5G Modes: FDD, TDD, SA (standalone), NSA (non-standalone)
- 5G mmWave specs: 800 MHz bandwidth, 8 carriers, 2×2 MIMO
- 5G sub-6 GHz specs: 200 MHz bandwidth, 4×4 MIMO
- 5G Peak Download Speed: 7,500 Mbit/s
- 5G Peak Upload Speed: 3,000 Mbit/s
- 5G RF: 100 MHz envelope tracking, Adaptive antenna tuning
- Performance Enhancement Technologies: Qualcomm 5G PowerSave, Qualcomm Signal Boost, Qualcomm Smart Transmit technology, Qualcomm RF Gaming Mode Boost, Qualcomm Wideband Envelope Tracking
- LTE Technology: LTE FDD, LTE TDD including CBRS support, LAA, LTE Broadcast, Voice over LTE
- Cellular Technology: WCDMA (DB-DC-HSDPA, DC-HSUPA), TD-SCDMA, CDMA 1x, EV-DO, GSM/EDGE
- Downlink LTE: LTE Category 22 (2,500 Mbit/s). 7×20 MHz carrier aggregation. Maximum 24 spatial streams. Up to 1,024 QAM. Up to 4×4 MIMO on five carriers, Full-Dimension MIMO (FD-MIMO)
- Uplink LTE: LTE Category 13 (316 Mbit/s). 3×20 MHz carrier aggregation. Up to 256 QAM
- TSMC 7 nm FinFET process

=== Snapdragon X60 5G ===
- For iPhone 13, iPhone 13 Mini, and iPhone 13 Pro series
- 5G Technology: 5G NR TDD, FDD, SA, NSA
- 5G Spectrum: mmWave-sub6 carrier aggregation, sub-6 carrier aggregation (FDD-TDD, FDD-FDD, TDD-TDD), Dynamic Spectrum Sharing (DSS), mmWave, sub-6 GHz
- 5G Modes: FDD, TDD, SA (standalone), NSA (non-standalone)
- 5G mmWave specs: 800 MHz bandwidth, 8 carriers, 2×2 MIMO
- 5G sub-6 GHz specs: 200 MHz bandwidth, 4×4 MIMO
- 5G Peak Download Speed: 7.5 Gbit/s
- 5G Peak Upload Speed: 3 Gbit/s
- Performance Enhancement Technologies: Qualcomm 5G PowerSave, Qualcomm Signal Boost, Qualcomm Smart Transmit technology, Qualcomm RF Gaming Mode Boost, Qualcomm Wideband Envelope Tracking
- 5G SIM: 5G Dual SIM support
- Cellular Technology: 5G NR, LTE, WCDMA (DB-DC-HSDPA, DC-HSUPA), TD-SCDMA, CDMA 1x, EV-DO, GSM/EDGE
- LTE Technology: LTE FDD, LTE TDD including CBRS support, LAA, LTE Broadcast, Voice over LTE
- Samsung 5 nm FinFET (5LPE) process

=== Snapdragon X65 5G ===
- For iPhone 14, iPhone 14 Plus, and iPhone 14 Pro series
- 5G Technology: 5G NR TDD, FDD, SA, NSA
- Cellular Technology: 5G NR, LTE, LAA, WCDMA (DB-DC-HSDPA), TD-SCDMA, CDMA 1x, GSM/EDGE, CBRS
- 5G Spectrum: mmWave-sub6 aggregation, sub-6 carrier aggregation (FDD-TDD, FDD-FDD, TDD-TDD), FDD-TDD support for uplink-CA, Dynamic Spectrum Sharing (DSS)
- 5G Modes: FDD, TDD, SA (standalone), NSA (non-standalone)
- Performance Enhancement Technologies: Qualcomm 5G PowerSave 2.0, Qualcomm Wideband Envelope Tracking (7th gen), Qualcomm AI-Enhanced Signal Boost, Qualcomm Smart Transmit Gen 2
- 5G mmWave specs: 1,000 MHz bandwidth, 10 carriers, 2×2 MIMO
- 5G sub-6 GHz specs: 300 MHz bandwidth, 256 QAM, 4×4 MIMO
- 5G Peak Download Speed: 10 Gbit/s
- 5G Global Multi-SIM support
- Global 5G band support including the new n259 (41 GHz), n70 and n53 bands
- LTE Technology: LTE FDD, LTE TDD including CBRS support, LAA, LTE Broadcast, Voice over LTE
- Samsung 4 nm FintFET (4LPE) process or TSMC 4 nm process.

=== Snapdragon X70 5G ===
- For iPhone 15, iPhone 15 Plus, and iPhone 15 Pro series
- 5G Technology: 5G NR TDD, FDD, SA, NSA, Voice over NR
- Cellular Technology: 5G NR, LTE, LAA, WCDMA, TD-SCDMA, GSM/EDGE, CBRS, Dynamic Spectrum Sharing (DSS), EN-DC, NR-DC, mmWave, sub-6 GHz
- 5G Spectrum: mmWave-sub6 aggregation, sub-6 carrier aggregation (FDD-TDD, FDD-FDD, TDD-TDD), FDD-TDD support for uplink-CA, Dynamic Spectrum Sharing (DSS)
- 5G Modes: FDD, TDD, SA (standalone), NSA (non-standalone)
- Performance Enhancement Technologies: Qualcomm 5G AI Suite (AI-based channel state feedback and optimization, AI-based mmWave beam management, AI-based network selection, AI-based signal boost with adaptive antenna tuning), Qualcomm 5G Ultra-Low Latency Suite, Qualcomm 5G PowerSave Gen 3, Qualcomm QET7100 Wideband Envelope Tracking, Qualcomm Smart Transmit Gen 3
- 5G mmWave specs: 800 MHz bandwidth, 8 carriers
- 5G sub-6 GHz specs: 300 MHz bandwidth, 4 carriers
- 5G Peak Download Speed: 10 Gbit/s
- 5G Peak Upload Speed: 3.5 Gbit/s
- 5G Global Multi-SIM including Dual-SIM Dual-Active support (Qualcomm DSDA Gen 1)

=== Snapdragon X71 5G ===
- Modified version of the X70
- For iPhone 16, iPhone 16 Plus, and iPhone 16 Pro series
- 5G Technology: 5G NR TDD, FDD, SA, NSA, Voice over NR
- Cellular Technology: 5G NR, LTE, LAA, WCDMA, TD-SCDMA, GSM/EDGE, CBRS, Dynamic Spectrum Sharing (DSS), EN-DC, NR-DC, mmWave, sub-6 GHz
- 5G Spectrum: mmWave-sub6 aggregation, sub-6 carrier aggregation (FDD-TDD, FDD-FDD, TDD-TDD), FDD-TDD support for uplink-CA, Dynamic Spectrum Sharing (DSS)
- 5G Modes: FDD, TDD, SA, NSA
- Performance Enhancement Technologies: Qualcomm 5G AI Suite, Qualcomm 5G AI Processor, Qualcomm 5G Ultra-Low Latency Suite, Qualcomm 5G PowerSave Gen 3, Qualcomm QET7100 Wideband Envelope Tracking, Qualcomm Smart Transmit Gen 3
- 5G mmWave specs: 800 MHz bandwidth, 8 carriers
- 5G sub-6 GHz specs: 300 MHz bandwidth, 4 carriers
- 5G Peak Download Speed: 10 Gbit/s
- 5G Peak Upload Speed: 3.5 Gbit/s
- 5G Global Dual-SIM with Qualcomm DSDA Gen 1

=== Snapdragon X72 5G ===
- 5G Technology: 5G NR TDD, FDD, SA, NSA, Voice over NR
- Cellular Technology: 5G NR, LTE, LAA, WCDMA, TD-SCDMA, GSM/EDGE, CBRS, Dynamic Spectrum Sharing (DSS), EN-DC, NR-DC, mmWave, sub-6 GHz
- 5G Spectrum: mmWave-sub6 aggregation, sub-6 carrier aggregation (FDD-TDD, FDD-FDD, TDD-TDD), FDD-TDD support for uplink-CA, Dynamic Spectrum Sharing (DSS)
- 5G Modes: FDD, TDD, NSA, SA
- 5G mmWave specs: 400 MHz bandwidth, 4 carriers
- 5G sub-6 GHz specs: 200 MHz bandwidth, 3 carriers
- Peak Download Speed: 4.4 Gbit/s
- Peak Upload Speed: 2.6 Gbit/s
- 5G Global Multi-SIM including Dual-SIM Dual-Active support Gen 2 (Qualcomm DSDA Gen 2)
- Performance Enhancement Technologies: Qualcomm 5G AI Processor Gen 2 with dedicated tensor accelerator, Qualcomm 5G AI Suite Gen 2 (Sensor-modem-RF solution for mmWave beam management, AI-enhanced channel state feedback, AI-enhanced antenna tuning, AI-enhanced GNSS Location Gen 2), Qualcomm 5G Ultra-Low Latency Suite Gen 2, Qualcomm 5G PowerSave Gen 4, Qualcomm QET7100 Wideband Envelope Tracking, Qualcomm Smart Transmit Gen 4 with Qualcomm Satellite support, Qualcomm Power RF Efficiency Suite, Qualcomm RF Downlink Boost, Qualcomm Advanced Modem-RF Software Suite (Qualcomm Smart Network Selection Gen 2, Qualcomm DSDA Gen 2 (Dual Data), Advanced Interference Cancelation)

=== Snapdragon X75 5G ===
- 5G Technology: 5G NR TDD, FDD, SA, NSA, Voice over NR
- Cellular Technology: 5G NR, LTE, LAA, WCDMA, TD-SCDMA, GSM/EDGE, CBRS, Dynamic Spectrum Sharing (DSS), EN-DC, NR-DC, mmWave, sub-6 GHz
- 5G Spectrum: mmWave-sub6 aggregation, sub-6 carrier aggregation (FDD-TDD, FDD-FDD, TDD-TDD), FDD-TDD support for uplink-CA, Dynamic Spectrum Sharing (DSS)
- 5G Modes: FDD, TDD, SA (standalone), NSA (non-standalone)
- 5G mmWave specs: 1,000 MHz bandwidth, 10 carriers
- 5G sub-6 GHz specs: 300 MHz bandwidth, 5 carriers
- 5G Peak Download Speed: 10 Gbit/s
- 5G Peak Upload Speed: 3.5 Gbit/s
- 5G Global Multi-SIM including Dual-SIM Dual-Active support Gen 2 (Qualcomm DSDA Gen 2)
- Qualcomm 5G AI Processor Gen 2 with dedicated tensor accelerator, Qualcomm 5G AI Suite Gen 2, Qualcomm 5G Ultra-Low Latency Suite Gen 2, Qualcomm 5G PowerSave Gen 4, Qualcomm QET7100 Wideband Envelope Tracking, Smart Transmit Gen 4

=== Snapdragon X80 ===
- Used in the iPhone 17, iPhone 17 Pro, iPhone 17 Pro Max, and in US models of iPhone 18 Pro Max.
- 5G Technology: 5G NR TDD, FDD, SA, NSA, Voice over NR
- Cellular Technology: Release 18 (5G Advanced) ready, 6xCA sub-6 downlink carrier aggregation, 1024 QAM Sub-6, FR1+FR2 CA, 5G NR, Sub-6 GHz, Sub-6 carrier aggregation (TDD-TDD, FDD-FDD, FDD-TDD), Dynamic Spectrum Sharing (DSS), EN-DC, NR-DC, LTE, WCDMA, LAA, GSM/EDGE, CBRS, mmWave, 5G FDD, 5G TDD, 5G SA, 5G NSA, F+F ULCA, FDD UL MIMO, Switched Uplink
- Performance Enhancement Technologies: Qualcomm 5G AI Processor Gen 2 with dedicated tensor accelerator, Qualcomm 5G AI Suite Gen 3, Qualcomm Advanced Modem-RF Software Suite, Qualcomm Smart Transmit Gen 5, Qualcomm 5G PowerSave Gen 5, Qualcomm RF Downlink Boost, Snapdragon Satellite, Qualcomm 5G Ultra-Low Latency Suite, Qualcomm RF Uplink Optimization
- 5G Peak Download Speed: 10 Gbit/s
- 5G Peak Upload Speed: 3.5 Gbit/s
- 5G mmWave specs: 1,000 MHz bandwidth, 10 carriers
- 5G Sub-6 GHz specs: 400 MHz bandwidth, 6 carriers
- Multi-SIM: Dual-SIM support with Qualcomm DSDA Gen 2 (Dual Data)

=== Qualcomm X85 5G ===
- 5G Technology: 5G NR TDD, FDD, SA, NSA, Voice over NR
- Cellular Technology: 3GPP Release 18 (5G Advanced) ready, 6xCA sub-6 downlink carrier aggregation, 1024 QAM Sub-6, FR1+FR2 CA, 5G NR, Sub-6 GHz, Sub-6 carrier aggregation (TDD-TDD, FDD-FDD, FDD-TDD), Dynamic Spectrum Sharing (DSS), EN-DC, NR-DC, LTE, WCDMA, LAA, GSM/EDGE, CBRS, mmWave, 5G FDD, 5G TDD, 5G SA, 5G NSA, F+F ULCA, FDD UL MIMO, Switched Uplink, 2x TDD UL MIMO
- Performance Enhancement Technologies: Qualcomm 5G AI Processor with dedicated tensor accelerator (30% faster AI inference vs. previous generation), AI-Powered Data Traffic Engine, Qualcomm Advanced Modem-RF Software Suite, Qualcomm Smart Transmit Plus technology, Qualcomm 5G PowerSave, Qualcomm RF Downlink Boost, Snapdragon Satellite
- 5G Peak Download Speed: 12.5 Gbit/s
- 5G Peak Upload Speed: 3.7 Gbit/s
- 5G mmWave specs: 1,000 MHz bandwidth, 10 carriers
- 5G Sub-6 GHz specs: 400 MHz bandwidth, 6 carriers
- Multi-SIM: Turbo DSDA with 3CC+1CC carrier aggregation
- First Qualcomm modem with 400 MHz downlink carrier aggregation bandwidth in Sub-6 GHz
- Also announced alongside the Qualcomm X82 5G Modem-RF, a mainstream variant optimized for mobile broadband applications with multi-gigabit speeds
- Chipsets: Snapdragon 8 Elite Gen 5 (integrated)

=== Qualcomm X105 5G ===
- 5G Technology: 5G NR TDD, FDD, SA, NSA, Voice over NR
- Cellular Technology: 3GPP Release 19 ready (world's first), 5G Advanced, 6xCA sub-6 downlink carrier aggregation, 1024 QAM Sub-6, FR1+FR2 DC, 5G NR, Sub-6 GHz, Sub-6 carrier aggregation (TDD-TDD, FDD-FDD, FDD-TDD), Dynamic Spectrum Sharing (DSS), LTE, WCDMA, LAA, GSM/EDGE, CBRS, mmWave, 5G FDD, 5G TDD, 5G SA, 5G NSA, Switched Uplink, Supplementary Uplink, NB-IoT for Extended Coverage
- Performance Enhancement Technologies: 5th-generation Qualcomm 5G AI Processor with dedicated tensor accelerator and agentic AI support, Qualcomm Advanced Modem-RF Software Suite, Qualcomm Smart Transmit Plus
- 5G Peak Download Speed: 14.8 Gbit/s (13.1 Gbit/s sub-6 GHz only)
- 5G Peak Upload Speed: 4.2 Gbit/s
- 5G mmWave specs: 10 carriers
- 5G Sub-6 GHz specs: 500 MHz carrier aggregation (DL), 6 carriers
- RF Transceiver: 6 nm architecture, up to 30% lower power consumption vs. previous generation, 15% smaller board footprint
- Satellite: Integrated NR-NTN (New Radio Non-Terrestrial Network) support for 5G over satellite (data, voice, and messaging)
- NB-IoT fallback connectivity for challenging environments (elevators, parking garages)
- Quad-band GNSS with 25% reduction in location services power consumption
- Announced at MWC Barcelona 2026 on March 2, 2026

=== Table of Snapdragon 5G X-series modems ===
| Modem | X50 | X51 | X52 | X53 | X55 | X60 | X62 | X65 | X70 | X35 | X72 | X75 | X80 | X85 | X105 |
|---|---|---|---|---|---|---|---|---|---|---|---|---|---|---|---|
| Introduction year | 2018 | 2020 | 2019 | 2021 | 2019 | 2020 | 2021 | | 2022 | 2023 | | | 2024 | 2025 | 2026 |
| LTE Class | —N/a | LTE Advanced Pro (4.5G) | | | | | | | | | | | | | |
| LTE Category (down / up) | —N/a | 22 | | | | | | | | 4 | 22 | | | | |
| Peak LTE speeds down (Gbit/s) | —N/a | 0.8 | 1.2 | | 2.5 | | 1.2 | 2.5 | | | | | | | |
| Peak LTE speed up (Gbit/s) | —N/a | 0.21 | | | 0.316 | | 0.21 | 0.316 | | | | | | | |
| 5G class | 5G NR | | | | | | | | | 5G NR-light | 5G Advanced | | | 5G Advanced | |
| 5G Modes | NSA, TDD | FDD, NSA, SA, TDD | | | | | | | | | | | | | |
| 5G Release support | 15 | | | | | | 16 | | | 17 | 18 | | | 18 | 19 |
| Peak 5G speeds down (Gbit/s) | 5 | 2.5 | 3.7 | | 7.5 | | 4.4 | 10 | | 0.22 | 4.4 | 10 | | 12.5 | 14.8 |
| Peak 5G speeds up (Gbit/s) | 0.316 | 0.9 | 1.6 | 2.9 | 3 | | 1.6 | 3 | 3.5 | 0.10 | 2.6 | 3.5 | | 3.7 | 4.2 |
| Snapdragon SoCs | 855, 855+, 860 | 480, 480+, 4 Gen 1, 690, 695 | 750G, 765, 765G, 768G | 778G, 778G+, 780G, 782G, 7c+ Gen 3 | 865, 865+, 870, 8c, 8cx, 8cx Gen 2, 8cx Gen 3 | 888, 888+ | 6 Gen 1, 7 Gen 1, 7+ Gen 2, 8cx Gen 3 | 8 Gen 1, 8+ Gen 1, 8cx Gen 3 | 8 Gen 2 | | | 8 Gen 3 | 8 Elite | 8 Elite Gen 5 | |
| Modems | SDX50 | | | | SDX55 | SDX60 | SDX62 | SDX65 | SDX70 | SDX35 | SDX72 | SDX75 | SDX80 | SDX85 | |

== Other Qualcomm modems ==
=== 9205 LTE ===
- CPU: ARM Cortex-A7 Up to 0.8 GHz
- LTE Technology: Rel.14 LTE Cat-M1, Rel.14 LTE Cat-NB2
- Cellular Technology: Rel.12 EGPRS MSC12
- Downlink LTE: 0.588 Mbit/s (Rel.14 Cat-M1), 0.127 Mbit/s (Rel.14 Cat-NB2)
- Uplink LTE: 1.119 Mbit/s (Rel.14 Cat-M1), 0.1585 Mbit/s (Rel.14 Cat-NB2)

=== MDM9206 IoT ===
- CPU: ARM Cortex-A7 Up to 1.3 GHz
- LTE Technology: LTE HD-FDD, LTE TDD (Rel.13 LTE Cat-M1, Rel.13 LTE Cat-NB1)
- Cellular Technology: E-GPRS
- Downlink LTE: 0.300 Mbit/s (Rel.13 Cat-M1), 0.020 Mbit/s (Rel.13 Cat-NB1)
- Uplink LTE: 0.375 Mbit/s (Rel.13 Cat-M1), 0.060 Mbit/s (Rel.13 Cat-NB1)

=== MDM9207-1 IoT ===
- CPU: ARM Cortex-A7 Up to 1.3 GHz
- LTE Technology: LTE FDD, LTE TDD
- Cellular Technology: DC-HSPA, TD-SCDMA, GSM
- Downlink LTE: 10 Mbit/s
- Uplink LTE: 5 Mbit/s

=== Qualcomm A10 5G ===
- Qualcomm's first 5G RedCap (Reduced Capability) modem for the automotive industry
- 5G Technology: 5G NR-Light (3GPP Release 17 RedCap), LTE
- 5G Modes: TDD, FDD, SA (standalone)
- 5G sub-6 GHz specs: 20 MHz bandwidth
- Designed to support automakers transitioning vehicles from 4G to 5G networks with lower complexity and cost
- Features: Next-generation eCall over RedCap and LTE networks, Qualcomm RFFE solution from digital to antenna
- Location: Simultaneous multi-frequency, multi-constellation GNSS processing (GPS, GLONASS, Galileo, BeiDou, QZSS), Qualcomm Dead Reckoning 3.0
- Automotive-grade RF modules with extended temperature range (−40 to +85 °C)
- Interfaces: SGMII, PCIe 2.0, UART, I²C, I²S, SPI, SDIO, USB 2.0
- Software: Snapdragon Telematics Application Framework (TelAF), Snapdragon Car-to-Cloud Services

=== FSM100xx 5G ===
- 5G Technology: 5G NR
- 5G Spectrum: mmWave, sub-6 GHz
- 10 nm process

== Related pages ==
- List of Qualcomm Snapdragon systems on chips
- Qualcomm Adreno
- Qualcomm Hexagon
- Qualcomm Snapdragon

== Similar platforms ==
- Balong Modems by HiSilicon
- Exynos Modems by Samsung
- Helio M Modems by MediaTek
- XMM Modems by Intel
- Makalu/SC Modems by UNISOC (formerly Spreadtrum)
