= Meizu M3 =

2016 smartphone model

- Brand: Meizu
- Manufacturer: Meizu
- Type: Smartphone
- Series: M
- First released: April 25, 2016; 10 years ago
- Predecessor: Meizu M2
- Successor: Meizu M5
- Related: Meizu M3s; Meizu M3E; Meizu M3 Max; Meizu M3 Note; Meizu M3x
- Compatible networks: GSM, 3G 4G (LTE)
- Form factor: Slate
- Colors: Gray, White, Blue, Pink, Gold
- Dimensions: 141.5×69.5×8.3 mm (5.57×2.74×0.33 in)
- Weight: 132 g (5 oz)
- Operating system: Initial: Android 5.1 Lollipop + Flyme 5.1; Current: Android 5.1 Lollipop + Flyme 6.3
- CPU: MediaTek MT6750 (28 nm), Octa-core (4×1.5 GHz Cortex-A53 & 4×1.0 GHz Cortex-A53)
- GPU: Mali-T860MP2
- Memory: 2/3 GB, LPDDR3
- Storage: 16/32 GB, eMMC 5.1
- Removable storage: MicroSDXC up to 128 GB
- Battery: Non-removable, Li-Ion 2870 mAh
- Charging: 10 W
- Rear camera: 13 MP Samsung S5K3L8, f/2.2, 26 mm (wide-angle), 1/3.06", 1.12 μm, PDAF; 2-LED dual-tone flash Video: 1080p@30fps
- Front camera: 5 MP Samsung S5K5E8, f/2.0, 41 mm (wide-angle), 1/5", 1.12 μm Video: 720p@30fps
- Display: IPS LCD, 5.0", 1280 × 720 (HD), 16:9, 294 ppi
- Data inputs: microUSB 2.0, 3.5 mm Audio, Bluetooth 4.0 (A2DP, LE), Wi-Fi 802.11 a/b/g/n (dual-band, hotspot), GPS, A-GPS, GLONASS
- Other: Accelerometer, gyroscope, proximity sensor, compass

Meizu M3 (models M688C, M688M, M688Q,& M688U) is a smartphone developed by Meizu, part of the "M" series. It was unveiled on April 25, 2016. It is the successor to the Meizu M2 (also known as Meizu M2 mini).

== Design ==
The screen is made of glass. The body is made of plastic.

The White, Pink, and Blue color options have glossy plastic, while the Grey and Gold options have a matte finish.

The bottom features a microUSB connector, a speaker, and a microphone. The top houses a 3.5 mm audio jack. On the left side, there's a hybrid slot for either two SIM cards or one SIM card and a microSD card up to 128 GB. The right side has the volume buttons and the power/lock button.

== Technical specifications ==
=== Platform ===
The smartphone features a MediaTek MT6750 processor and a Mali-T860MP2 GPU.

=== Battery ===
The battery received a capacity of 2870 mAh.

=== Camera ===
The smartphone features a 13 MP main camera, f/2.2 (wide-angle) with phase autofocus and 1080p@30fps video recording capability. The front camera has a 5 MP resolution (wide-angle), f/2.0 aperture, and 720p@30fps video recording capability.

=== Display ===
The phone's display is an IPS LCD, 5.0", 1280 × 720 (HD) with a 16:9 aspect ratio and a pixel density of 294 ppi.

=== Storage ===
The smartphone was sold in 2/16 and 3/32 GB configurations.

=== Hardware ===
The smartphone was released running Flyme 5.2, based on Android 5.1 Lollipop, and was later updated to Flyme 6.3.

=== Software ===
The Meizu M3 was released with Flyme OS 5.1, which is based on Android 5.1 (Lollipop). Flyme OS is a custom Android user interface developed by Meizu.
