= Meizu M5c =

Android smartphone

Meizu M5c (Mblu A5 in China)
- Brand: Meizu/Mblu
- Manufacturer: Meizu
- Type: Smartphone
- Series: M series
- First released: May 23, 2017; 9 years ago
- Successor: Meizu M8c
- Related: Meizu M5; Meizu M5s; Meizu M5 Note
- Compatible networks: GSM, 3G, 4G (LTE)
- Form factor: Slate
- Dimensions: 144×70.5×8.3 mm (5.67×2.78×0.33 in)
- Weight: 135 g (5 oz)
- Operating system: Android 6.0 Marshmallow with Flyme 6
- System-on-chip: MediaTek MT6737 (28 nm)
- CPU: Quad-core 1.3 GHz Cortex-A53
- GPU: Mali-T720MP1
- Memory: 2 GB LPDDR3
- Storage: 16 GB eMMC 5.0
- Removable storage: microSDXC up to 128 GB
- SIM: Hybrid Dual SIM (Nano-SIM)
- Battery: Non-removable Li-Ion 3000 mAh
- Charging: 7.5 W
- Rear camera: 8 MP Samsung S5K4H8, f/2.0, 24 mm, 1/4", 1.12 µm, AF; LED flash, panorama Video: 1080p@30fps
- Front camera: 5 MP Samsung S5K5E8, f/2.2, 36 mm (wide-angle), 1/5", 1.12 µm Video: 1080p@30fps
- Display: IPS LCD, 5", 1280 × 720 (HD), 16:9 ratio, 294 ppi
- Connectivity: microUSB 2.0, 3.5 mm audio jack, Bluetooth 4.1 (A2DP, LE), Wi-Fi 802.11 a/b/g/n (dual-band), GPS (A-GPS), GLONASS
- Data inputs: Touchscreen Multi-touch, microphone, accelerometer, gyroscope (digital), proximity sensor, compass
- Codename: m1710
- Made in: China
- Website: https://www.meizu.com/en/products/m5c/summary.html

The Meizu M5c is an entry-level Android smartphone developed by Meizu, launching as a low-end version of the Meizu M5. It was introduced on May 23, 2017. In China, the Mblu A5 was introduced on July 3, 2017.

== Design ==
The front panel is made of glass, and the body is made of matte plastic.

The bottom features a microUSB port along with the speaker and microphone. The top houses a 3.5 mm audio jack. On the left side is a hybrid tray with one slot for a SIM card and a second slot for either a SIM card or a microSD memory card up to 128 GB. The right side contains the volume rocker and the power button.

The Meizu M5c was sold in five colors: Black, Blue, Red, Gold, and Pink.

== Specifications ==
=== Hardware ===
The Meizu M5c features an entry-level MediaTek SoC, the MT6737. The device has 2 GB of LPDDR3 RAM and 16 GB of eMMC 5.0 internal storage.

The battery has a capacity of 3000 mAh.

The Meizu M5c has a 5-inch IPS LCD with a resolution of HD (1280 × 720), a 16:9 aspect ratio, and a pixel density of 294 ppi.

The smartphone is equipped with a wide-angle 8 MP main camera with an f/2.0 aperture and autofocus, and a 5 MP (ArcSoft beautiness) wide-angle front camera with an f/2.0 aperture. Both the main and front cameras are capable of recording video at 1080p@30fps.

=== Software ===
The smartphone was released running Flyme 6 based on Android 6.0 Marshmallow.

== Criticism ==
A reviewer from Pingvin.Pro rated as a 3.8/10 for the Meizu M5c. The smartphone's appearance, screen, and connectivity were listed as advantages, while noted low performance was a disadvantage.
