= Meizu M5 Note =

Smartphone

- Manufacturer: Meizu
- Type: Touchscreen smartphone
- Series: Meizu M Series
- First released: December 6, 2016; 9 years ago
- Predecessor: Meizu M3 Note
- Compatible networks: GSM, UMTS, HSPA, LTE
- Dimensions: 153.6 mm (6.05 in) H 75.8 mm (2.98 in) W 8.2 mm (0.32 in) D
- Weight: 175 g (6.2 oz)
- Operating system: Before: Flyme OS 5.2.11.1G, based on Android 6.0 Marshmallow Now: Flyme OS 7.1.0.0G, based on Android 6.0 Marshmallow
- System-on-chip: MTK6755 processor
- CPU: ARM® Cortex®-A53™ 1.8GhzX4+1.0GhzX4
- GPU: ARM Mali-T860MP2
- Memory: 3/4 GB LPDDR3
- Storage: 16, 32 or 64 GB flash memory
- Removable storage: microSDXC card support up to 128 GB (uses shared SIM slot)
- SIM: Dual SIM
- Battery: 4000 mAh Li-Ion rechargeable battery, not replaceable
- Charging: mCharge 4 24W fast charging
- Rear camera: 13 MP, PDAF laser autofocus, ƒ/2.2 aperture, LED flash, 4K video recording
- Front camera: 5.0 MP, ƒ/2.0 aperture
- Display: 5.5 inch diagonal TDDI; 1920x1080 px (403 ppi)
- Connectivity: 3.5 mm TRS connector, Bluetooth 4.0 with BLE, Dual-band WiFi (802.11 a/b/g/n)
- Data inputs: Multi-touch capacitive touchscreen, A-GPS, GLONASS, BDS, Accelerometer, Gyroscope, Proximity sensor, Digital compass, Ambient light sensor
- Other: Dual SIM support with dual standby mode, 3D Press force touch technology, Infrared proximity sensor, gyroscope, ambient light sensor

The Meizu M5 Note is a smartphone designed and produced by the Chinese manufacturer Meizu, which runs on Flyme OS, Meizu's modified Android operating system. It was the successor of the Meizu M3 Note. It was unveiled on December 6, 2016 in Beijing.

== History ==
On October 31, 2016, Meizu officially launched the M5 in Beijing.

Later in December, Meizu announced and unveiled the M5 Note, targeted at budget-conscious consumers looking for a decent mid-range device.

=== Release ===
Pre-orders for the M5 Note began after the launch event on December 8, 2016. Sales in mainland China began in December 2016.

== Specifications ==
=== Flyme ===
The M5 was released with Flyme OS version 5.2.11.1G, a modified operating system based on Android Marshmallow.It is updated to Flyme 7.1.0.0G based on Android Marshmallow.

=== Hardware and design ===
The Meizu M5 Note has a MTK6755 octa-core processor with an array of ten ARM Cortex CPU cores, an ARM Mali-T860MP2 GPU and 3 to 4 GB of RAM LPDDR3 (depending on the version 16/32 or 64 GB). Unlike most other Android smartphones, the M5 Note has neither capacitive buttons nor on-screen buttons; the functionality of these keys is implemented using a technology which makes use of gestures with the home screen button, which also acts as a fingerprint sensor, called mBack.The haptic technology that debuted on the Meizu M3, which allows the user to perform a different action by pressing the touchscreen instead of tapping, also features on the M5. The M5 Note has a 5.5-inch LTPS IPS LCD multi-touch capacitive touchscreen display with a resolution of 1920 by 1080 pixels, and a pixel density of 403 ppi.

The device has a volume/zoom control and the power/lock button on the right side and a 3.5 mm TRS audio jack. Like its predecessor, it uses USB Micro-B for both connectivity and charging.

The device has front and back cameras, with resolutions of 5 megapixels and 13 megapixels, respectively.

The M5 Note is available in four colours: champagne gold, silver, grey, and blue; and comes with either 16, 32 or 64 GB of internal storage.

=== Camera ===
The Meizu M5 Note features a 13 MP main camera with an f/2.2 aperture and phase detection autofocus (PDAF); it is equipped with a dual-LED dual-tone flash. The phone is capable of recording videos in 1080p resolution at 30 frames per second. it has a 5 MP front-facing camera with an f/2.0 aperture.

=== Software ===
The Meizu M5 Note was launched with Android 6.0 (Marshmallow) and Meizu's custom user interface, Flyme OS 5.2.

== Reception ==
The M5 Note received mixed reviews. Android Authority praised the Fingerprint sensor on the device, saying "There's a fingerprint sensor below the screen that wakes up the device in 0.2 seconds and will keep your precious data safe."

Digital Trends however commented on the timing and how the M5 Note was more of an upgrade stating, "The peculiar thing about the M5 Note is it arrives less than a year after the M3 Note's introduction, making it much more of an incremental upgrade than anything else."

GSM Arena concluded that whilst featuring an attractive design, Meizu M5 Note was described as being less impressive than competitor devices, noting "everything about the phone is average, while the competition goes above and beyond the understanding of the term average." Android Headlines also commented on the issue of LTE support, saying it should be carefully considered "If you live in a country where the Meizu M5 Note supports all of the bands that you need for LTE, then definitely."

Phandroid commented that storage could be an issue saying, "just as long as you opt for the 32GB models so you can install more than a few dozen apps before running out of storage."

== See also ==
- Meizu
- Meizu M3 Max
- Meizu M5
