= Meizu M3E =

Smartphone

Meizu M3E (Meizu E in China)
- Manufacturer: Meizu
- Type: Smartphone
- Series: Meizu M Series/E Series
- First released: August 10, 2016; 9 years ago
- Successor: Meizu E2
- Related: Meizu M3; Meizu M3 Max; Meizu M3 Note; Meizu M3x
- Compatible networks: GSM, UMTS, HSPA, LTE
- Dimensions: 153.6 mm (6.05 in) H 75.8 mm (2.98 in) W 7.9 mm (0.31 in) D
- Weight: 172 g (6.1 oz)
- Operating system: Flyme OS, based on Android 6.0 Marshmallow
- System-on-chip: MediaTek MT6755 Helio P10
- CPU: Octa-core (4x1.5GHz Cortex-A53, 4x1.0GHz Cortex-A53)
- GPU: ARM Mali-T860 MP2
- Memory: 3 GB LPDDR3
- Storage: 32 GB flash memory
- Removable storage: microSD slot (up to 256 GB)
- Battery: 3100 mAh Li-Ion rechargeable battery, not replaceable
- Rear camera: 13.0 MP, PDAF autofocus, ƒ/2.2 aperture, LED flash, 1080p30 recording
- Front camera: 5.0 MP, ƒ/2.0 aperture
- Display: 5.5 inch diagonal IPS; 1080x1920 px (296 ppi)
- Connectivity: 3.5 mm TRS connector, Bluetooth 4.1 with BLE, Dual-band WiFi (802.11 a/b/g/n/ac)
- Data inputs: Multi-touch capacitive touchscreen, A-GPS, GLONASS, Accelerometer, Gyroscope, Proximity sensor, Digital compass, Ambient light sensor
- Other: Dual SIM support with dual standby mode

The Meizu M3E (also known as Meizu E in China) is a smartphone designed and produced by the Chinese manufacturer Meizu, which runs on Flyme OS, Meizu's modified Android operating system. It is a current model of the M series. It was unveiled on August 10, 2016, in Beijing.

== History ==
In July 2016, rumors about a new mid-range Meizu device appeared after several leaked pictures and specifications had been leaked on social media. According to these rumors, the new device was supposed to be called "M1E" and feature a MediaTek Helio P10 system-on-a-chip with a Mali T-860 GPU.

On August 2, 2016, a launch event for the new device for August 10, 2016, was officially announced.

=== Release ===
As announced, the M3E was released in Beijing on August 10, 2016.

Pre-orders for the M3E began after the launch event on August 10, 2016.

== Features ==
=== Flyme ===
The Meizu M3E was released with an updated version of Flyme OS, a modified operating system based on Android Marshmallow. It features an alternative, flat design and improved one-handed usability.

=== Hardware and design ===
The Meizu M3E features a MediaTek Helio P10 system-on-a-chip with an array of eight ARM Cortex-A53 CPU cores and an ARM Mali-T860 MP2 GPU. The M3E comes with 3 GB of RAM and 32 GB of internal storage. It reaches a score of 47397 points on the AnTuTu benchmark.

The Meizu M3E is available in five different colors (grey, silver, champagne gold, rose gold and blue). It has a full-metal body, which measures 153.6 mm (6.05 in) x 75.8 mm (2.98 in) x 8.3 mm (0.33 in) and weighs 138 g (4.9 oz).

The Meizu M3E has a slate form factor, being rectangular with rounded corners and has only one central physical button at the front. Unlike most other Android smartphones, the M3E doesn't have capacitive buttons nor on-screen buttons; the functionality of these keys is implemented using a technology called mBack, which makes use of gestures with the physical button. The M3E further extends this button by a fingerprint sensor called mTouch.

The Meizu M3E features a fully laminated 5.5-inch IPS multi-touch capacitive touchscreen display with 1080x1920 pixels (Full HD) resolution and 403 ppi pixel density. In addition to the touchscreen input and the front key, the device has volume/zoom control buttons and the power/lock button on the right side, a 3.5mm TRS audio jack on the top and a microUSB (Micro-B type) port on the bottom for charging and connectivity.

The Meizu M3E has two cameras. The rear camera has a resolution of 13 MP, a ƒ/2.2 aperture, a 5-element lens, phase-detection autofocus and an LED flash. The front camera has a resolution of 5 MP, a ƒ/2.0 aperture and a 4-element lens.

=== Camera ===
The Meizu M3e features a 13 MP main camera with an f/2.2 aperture and phase detection autofocus (PDAF). has a dual-LED dual-tone flash. The device is equipped with a 5 MP front-facing camera with an f/2.0 aperture.

== See also ==
- Meizu
