= Meizu C9 =

2018 Android smartphone developed by Meizu

Meizu C9 Meizu C9 Pro
- Manufacturer: Meizu
- Type: Smartphone
- First released: December 6, 2018; 7 years ago
- Predecessor: Meizu M8c
- Compatible networks: C9: FDD-LTE:B1/2/3/5/8 TD-LTE:B40 WCDMA: B1/2/5/8 GSM: B2/3/5/8 C9 Pro: FDD-LTE: B1/2/3/5/7/8 TD-LTE: B40 WCDMA: B1/2/5/8 GSM: B2/3/5/8
- Form factor: Monoblock
- Colors: C9: Black, Blue; C9 Pro: Black, Gold
- Dimensions: 146.2×71.2×9.7 mm (5.76×2.80×0.38 in)
- Weight: 150 g (5 oz)
- Operating system: Android 8.1 Oreo
- System-on-chip: UNISOC SC9832E (L+G only)
- CPU: 4×1.3 GHz Cortex-A53
- GPU: Mali-T820MP1
- Memory: C9: 2 GB; C9 Pro: 3 GB; LPDDR3
- Storage: C9: 16 GB; C9 Pro: 32 GB eMMC 5.0
- Removable storage: MicroSDXC up to 128 GB
- SIM: Dual SIM (Nano-SIM)
- Battery: Removable, Li-Ion 3000 mAh
- Charging: 5 W, 5V-1A charging
- Rear camera: 13 MP, f/2.2, 1/3.1", single pixel 1.12 μm, AF, 5 element lens LED flash, panorama Video: 1080p@30fps
- Front camera: C9: GC8034 8 MP, f/2.2, 1/4", single pixel 1.12 μm, 4-element lens, FF; C9 Pro: GC13023 W 13 MP, f/2.0, (wide-angle), 1/3.1", single pixel 1.12 μm, 5 element lens, FF; 1080p@30fps
- Display: IGZO LCD, 5.45", 1440 × 720 (HD+), 18:9, 282 ppi, 1000:1 contrast ratio, 350cd/m² brightness (typical value)
- Sound: Mono sound
- Connectivity: microUSB 2.0, 3.5 mm Audio, Bluetooth 4.1 (A2DP, LE), Wi-Fi 2.4 GHz 802.11 b/g/n, GPS, GLONASS
- Other: Accelerometer, proximity sensor, compass, gravity sensor, ambient light sensor, range sensor
- Website: https://m.meizu.com/en/c9/spec/?click=mmz_product_index_learnmore

The Meizu C9 and Meizu C9 Pro are entry-level of Android smartphones developed and manufactured by Meizu. It was first released on December 6, 2018. The main differences between the models are the amount of memory, colors and the front camera.

== Design ==
The screen is made of glass, and the body is made of plastic.

At the bottom are located a microUSB connector, a microphone and a 3.5 mm audio jack, and on the right, a volume adjustment and a power button. On the front above the display are located a proximity/light sensor, an earpiece, a front camera and a LED indicator, and on the back, the main camera, LED flash, logo and speaker. Slots for two SIM cards and a microSD memory card up to 128 GB are located under the removable back panel.

The Meizu C9 was sold in black and blue colors, while the Meizu C9 Pro was sold in black and gold colors.

== Technical specifications ==
=== Hardware ===
Both smartphones are equipped with a UNISOC SC9832E (L+G only) processor with a Mali-T820MP1 graphics processor. The Meizu C9 was sold in a 2/16 GB configuration, and The C9 Pro sold in a 3/32 GB configuration.

The phone's battery received a capacity of 3000 mAh. To save battery, there is also a feature that automatically allocates memory and optimizes its power consumption. There is also a possibility of self-replacement.

The display has an IGZO IPS LCD, 5.45 ", 1440 × 720 (HD+) with an aspect ratio of 18:9 and a pixel density of 282 ppi, 1000:1 contrast ratio and 350cd/m² brightness (typical value).

Both smartphones received a 13 MP main camera with a aperture of f/2.2 and autofocus, 1/3.1", single pixel 1.12 μm, 5 element lens, panorama mode and a LED flash. Also, the Meizu C9 received a GC8034 8 MP front camera with an aperture of f/2.2, 1/4", single pixel 1.12 μm,4-element lens, FF and Meizu C9 Pro — a GC13023 W 13 MP one with an aperture of f/2.0, 1/3.1", single pixel 1.12 μm, 5 element lens and FF. The main and front cameras of both models can record video in 1080p@30fps resolution.

=== Software ===
Both smartphones are running on "pure" Android 8.1 Oreo.
