= Meizu M2 =

Smartphone developed by Meizu

- Manufacturer: Meizu
- Type: Smartphone
- Series: Meizu M
- First released: China; July 2015; 10 years ago
- Predecessor: Meizu M1
- Successor: Meizu M3
- Compatible networks: 2G; 3G; 4G LTE
- Dimensions: 140.1 mm (5.52 in) H 68.9 mm (2.71 in) W 8.7 mm (0.34 in) D
- Weight: 131 g (4.6 oz)
- Operating system: Android 5.1 Lollipop (Flyme UI)
- System-on-chip: MediaTek MT6735
- CPU: Quad-core 1.3 GHz Cortex-A53
- GPU: Mali T720MP2
- Memory: 2 GB LPDDR3
- Storage: 16 GB or 32 GB
- Removable storage: Up to 128 GB (uses SIM 1 slot)
- Battery: Non-removable 2500 mAh
- Rear camera: 13 MP, 1/3.06" sensor size, 5-element lens, ƒ/2.2, with autofocus, 4X digital zoom, LED flash, and 1080p recording.
- Front camera: 5 MP, ƒ/2.0, 69° wide angle, and 1080p recording.
- Display: 5.0 in (130 mm) 720p (294 ppi) IGZO display
- Connectivity: Bluetooth 4.0, WiFi n/g/b/a, supports dual-band Wi-Fi (2.4GHz/5GHz).
- Codename: M578H

The Meizu M2 is a smartphone developed by Meizu (Chinese: 魅族科技有限公司), or simply "Meizu" (Chinese: 魅族; pinyin: Mèi Zú). It is part of Meizu's mid-range smartphone line and was released in July 2015 in China and internationally shortly after. The Meizu M2 is the successor of the Meizu M1 Note. Visually the biggest difference compared to the previous model is a new capacitive / physical home button and a separate notification LED. it has a polycarbonate unibody design with rounded back and edges along with a rather minimalist front. The M2 comes in three glossy colors (white, blue and pink) and matte grey.

== See also ==
- Meizu
