= Meizu M2 Note =

Smartphone from Meizu

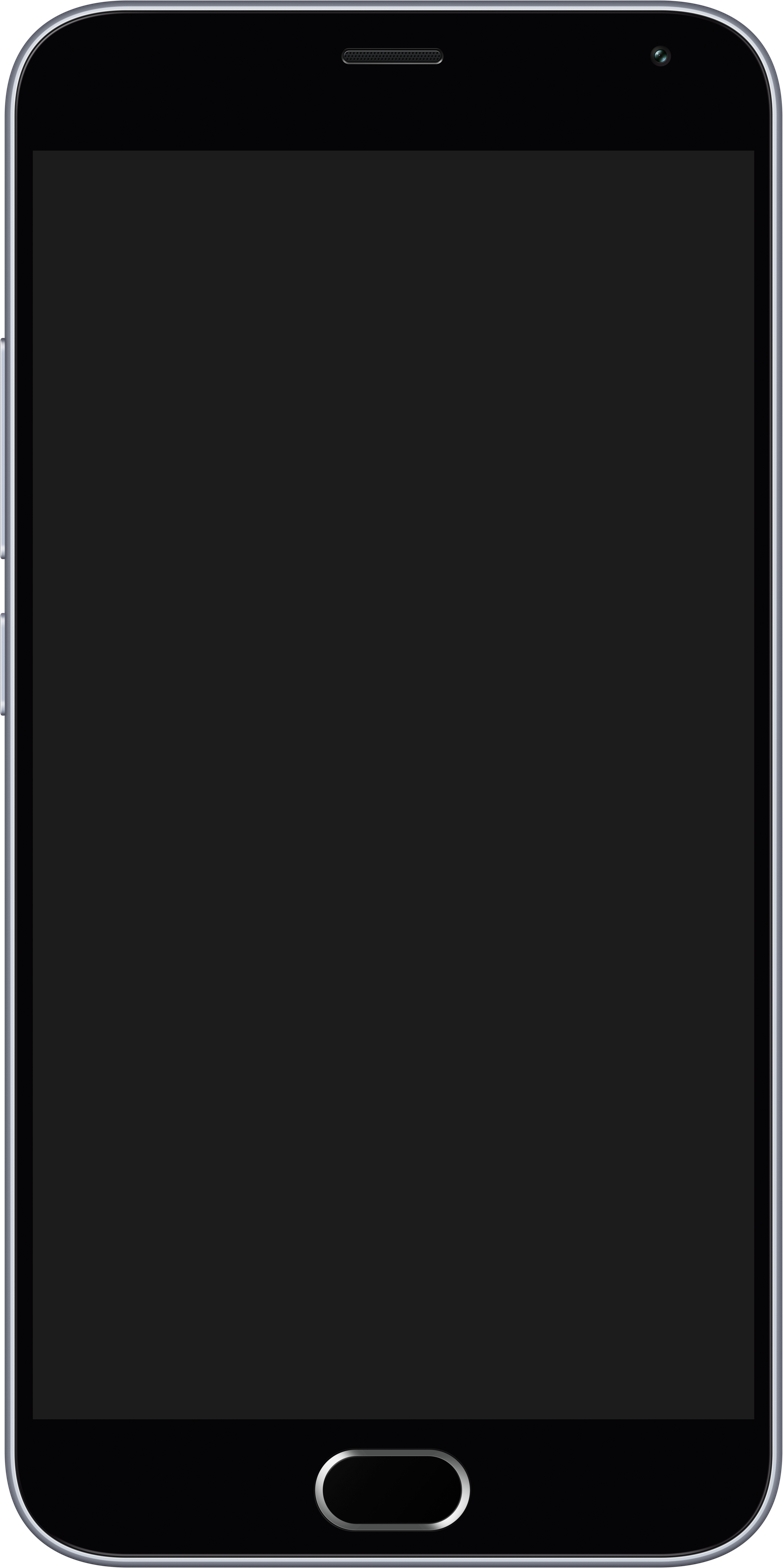
- Manufacturer: Meizu
- Type: Touchscreen smartphone
- Series: Meizu M Series
- First released: June 2, 2015; 11 years ago
- Predecessor: Meizu M1 Note
- Compatible networks: GSM, UMTS, HSPA, LTE
- Dimensions: 150.9 mm (5.94 in) H 75.2 mm (2.96 in) W 8.7 mm (0.34 in) D
- Weight: 149 g (5.3 oz)
- Operating system: Flyme OS, based on Android 5.0 Lollipop
- System-on-chip: MediaTek MTK MT6753
- CPU: Octa-core (8x1.3GHz Cortex-A53)
- GPU: ARM Mali-T720 MP3
- Memory: 2 GB LPDDR3
- Storage: 16 GB flash memory
- Removable storage: microSD slot (up to 128 GB)
- Battery: 3100 mAh Li-Ion rechargeable battery, not replaceable
- Rear camera: 13.0 MP, autofocus, ƒ/2.2 aperture, LED flash, 1080p30 recording
- Front camera: 5.0 MP, ƒ/2.0 aperture
- Display: 5.5 inch diagonal IGZO; 1080x1920 px (403 ppi)
- Connectivity: 3.5 mm TRS connector, Bluetooth 4.0 with BLE, Dual-band WiFi (802.11 a/b/g/n)
- Data inputs: Multi-touch capacitive touchscreen, A-GPS, GLONASS, Accelerometer, Gyroscope, Proximity sensor, Digital compass, Ambient light sensor
- Other: Dual SIM support with dual standby mode

The Meizu M2 Note is a smartphone designed and produced by the Chinese manufacturer Meizu, which runs on Flyme OS, Meizu's modified Android operating system. It is a previous phablet model of the M series, succeeding the Meizu M1 Note and preceding the Meizu M3 Note. It was unveiled on June 2, 2015, in Beijing.

== History ==
Initial rumors appeared in May 2015 after a possible render image of the new device had been leaked. Unlike the predecessor, the M1 Note, the new device would have a physical home button instead of a capacitive one.

On May 29, the specifications of the device have been allegedly sighted on the Android benchmark application GFXBench. According to this release, the device would feature 2 GB of RAM and a MediaTek MTK MT6753 system-on-a-chip.

The following day, Meizu officially confirmed that there will be a launch event for the M2 Note in Beijing on June 2.

=== Release ===
As announced, the M2 Note was released in Beijing on June 2, 2015.

The M2 Note was launched in India on August 10, 2015.

Over 1.2 million devices have been sold in the first month after the release.

== Features ==
=== Flyme ===
The Meizu M2 Note was released with an updated version of Flyme OS, a modified operating system based on Android Lollipop. It features an alternative, flat design and improved one-handed usability.

=== Hardware and design ===
The Meizu M2 Note features a MediaTek MTK MT6753 system-on-a-chip with an array of eight ARM Cortex-A53 CPU cores, an ARM Mali-T720 MP3 GPU and 2 GB of RAM. The M2 Note reaches a score of 31,890 points on the AnTuTu benchmark.

The M2 Note is available in four different colors (white, blue, pink and grey) and comes with 2 GB of RAM and 16 GB or 32 GB of internal storage.

The M2 Note measures 150.9 mm (5.94 in) x 75.2 mm (2.96 in) x 8.7 mm (0.34 in) and weighs 163 g (5.7 oz). It has a slate form factor, being rectangular with rounded corners and has only one central physical button at the front. Unlike most other Android smartphones, the M2 Note doesn't have capacitive buttons nor on-screen buttons. The functionality of these keys is implemented using a technology called mBack, which makes use of gestures with the physical button. Unlike some other Meizu devices, a fingerprint sensor isn't integrated into the home button.

The M2 Note features a fully laminated 5.5-inch IGZO capacitive touchscreen display with a FHD resolution of 1080 by 1920 pixels. The pixel density of the display is 403 ppi.

In addition to the touchscreen input and the front key, the device has volume/zoom control buttons and the power/lock button on the right side, a 3.5mm TRS audio jack on the top and a microUSB (Micro-B type) port on the bottom for charging and connectivity.

The Meizu M2 Note has two cameras. The rear camera has a resolution of 13 MP, a ƒ/2.2 aperture, a 5-element lens, autofocus and an LED flash. The front camera has a resolution of 5 MP, a ƒ/2.0 aperture and a 4-element lens.

=== Camera ===
The Meizu M2 Note features a 13 MP main camera with an f/2.2 aperture, dual-LED dual-tone flash. It is capable of shooting videos at 1080p resolution at 30fps. The front camera is a 5 MP sensor with an f/2.0 aperture and can also record 1080p video at 30fps.

== Reception ==
The M2 Note received generally positive reviews.

Android Authority gave the M2 Note a rating of 8 out of 10 possible points and concluded that "the Meizu M2 Note packs a very large punch for its price". Furthermore, the build quality, battery life and the good display were praised.

PhoneArena rated the M2 Note with 9 out of 10 possible points and stated that the "Meizu m2 Note has a lot to offer, as it's a phone that comes with no huge compromises".

Android Headlines also reviewed the device and concluded that "the M2 Note is a great looking smartphone and can get everything you need done".

== See also ==
- Meizu
- Meizu M1 Note
- Meizu M3 Note
