= Meizu 16Xs =

Mid-range smartphone

- Manufacturer: Meizu
- Type: Smartphone
- First released: May 30, 2019; 7 years ago
- Predecessor: Meizu 16X
- Successor: Meizu 18X
- Compatible networks: GSM, 3G, 4G (LTE)
- Form factor: Slate
- Colors: Jade White, Black, Atlantis Blue, Coral Orange
- Dimensions: 151 mm (5.9 in) H 73.5 mm (2.89 in) W 7.5 mm (0.30 in) D
- Weight: 165 g (5.8 oz)
- Operating system: Original: Android 9 Pie + Flyme 7.3; Current: Android 10 + Flyme 8.1
- System-on-chip: Qualcomm Snapdragon 675 (11 nm)
- CPU: Octa-core (2x2.0 GHz Kryo 460 Gold & 6x1.7 GHz Kryo 460 Silver)
- GPU: Adreno 612
- Memory: 6 GB LPDDR4X
- Storage: 64/128 GB UFS 2.1
- SIM: Dual SIM (Nano-SIM)
- Battery: Non-removable, Li-Po 4000 mAh
- Charging: Fast charging mCharge 4 (24 W)
- Rear camera: 48 MP Samsung S5KGM1, f/1.7 (wide), 1/2.0", 1.55 μm, PDAF + 8 MP, f/2.2, 15 mm, 118.8° (ultrawide) + 5 MP, f/1.9 (depth); LED flash, HDR, panorama Video: 4K@30fps, 1080p@30fps; gyro-EIS
- Front camera: 16 MP, f/2.2, 26 mm (wide), 1/3.06", 1.0 µm, PDAF; HDR; Video: 1080p@30fps
- Display: Super AMOLED, 6.2", 2232 × 1080, 18.6:9 aspect ratio, 403 ppi
- Made in: China
- Website: www.meizu.com/en/16xs/summary

The Meizu 16Xs is a mid-range Android-based smartphone developed and marketed by Meizu. It was announced on May 30, 2019.

== Technical specifications ==
=== Design ===
The front and back panels are made of glass, and the frame is made of aluminum.

On the bottom are the USB-C port, speaker, microphone, and 3.5 mm audio jack. On the top is a second microphone, on the left is a slot for 2 SIM cards, and on the right are the volume rocker and lock button.

The Meizu 16Xs was sold in 4 colors: Jade White, Black, Atlantis Blue, and Coral Orange.

=== Hardware ===
The Meizu 16Xs is powered by the mid-range Qualcomm Snapdragon 675 system-on-chip. The smartphone has 6 GB of LPDDR4X RAM and was sold with either 64 GB or 128 GB of UFS 2.1 internal storage.

The battery has a capacity of 4000 mAh and supports 24 W mCharge 4 fast charging.

The screen is a 6.2-inch Super AMOLED Full HD+ (2232 × 1080) display with an 18.6:9 aspect ratio and a pixel density of 403 ppi. An optical fingerprint scanner is integrated under the display.

The smartphone features a triple rear camera setup: 48 MP, f/1.7 (wide) + 8 MP, f/2.2 (ultrawide) + 5 MP, f/1.9 (depth sensor) with phase-detection autofocus and 4K video recording at 30 fps. The front camera has a resolution of 16 MP (wide), an f/2.2 aperture, and supports 1080p video recording at 30 fps.

=== Software ===
The Meizu 16Xs was released running Flyme 7.3 based on Android 9 Pie, and was later updated to Flyme 8.1 based on Android 10.
