= Meizu M8c =

LTE Android smartphone

- Brand: Meizu
- Type: Smartphone
- Series: M series
- First released: May 24, 2018; 8 years ago
- Availability by region: Russia
- Predecessor: Meizu M5c
- Successor: Meizu C9
- Related: Meizu M8
- Compatible networks: GSM, 3G, 4G (LTE)
- Form factor: Slate
- Colors: Black, Blue, Red, Gold
- Dimensions: 146.4×70×8.5 mm (5.76×2.76×0.33 in)
- Weight: 140 g (5 oz)
- Operating system: Android 7.1.2 Nougat + Flyme 6.3
- System-on-chip: Qualcomm Snapdragon 425 (28 nm)
- CPU: Quad-core 1.4 GHz Cortex-A53
- GPU: Adreno 308
- Memory: 2 GB LPDDR3
- Storage: 16/32 GB eMMC 5.1
- Removable storage: microSDXC up to 128 GB
- Battery: Non-removable Li-Ion 3070 mAh
- Charging: 10 W
- Rear camera: 13 MP, f/2.2 (wide), PDAF; LED flash Video: 1080p@30fps
- Front camera: 8 MP, f/2.0 Video: 1080p@30fps
- Display: 5.45" IPS LCD, 1440 × 720 (HD+), 18:9 ratio, 295 ppi
- Sound: Mono speaker
- Connectivity: microUSB 2.0, 3.5 mm jack, Bluetooth 4.1 (A2DP, LE), Wi-Fi 802.11 a/b/g/n, GPS (A-GPS)
- Data inputs: Touchscreen multi-touch, microphone, accelerometer, proximity sensor
- Codename: m1810
- Made in: China

The Meizu M8c is an entry-level Android smartphone developed and manufactured by Meizu. It was introduced on May 24, 2018, in Russia.

== Specifications ==
=== Design & build ===
The front panel is made of glass, while the body is constructed from matte plastic.

The bottom features the microUSB port along with the speaker and microphone grilles. The top houses the 3.5 mm audio jack. On the left is a hybrid tray with one slot for a SIM card and another slot for either a second SIM card or a microSD card up to 128 GB and the right side contains the volume rocker and the power button.

The Meizu M8c was sold in four colors: Black, Blue, Red, and Gold.

=== Hardware ===
The Meizu M8c is powered by the entry-level Qualcomm Snapdragon 425 system on a chip. The device features 2 GB of LPDDR3 RAM and either 16 GB or 32 GB of eMMC 5.1 internal storage.

The battery has a capacity of 3070 mAh with 10-watt charging, which takes 2 hours and 30 minutes to fully charge the device. Also, the Meizu M8c features a 5.45-inch IPS LCD display with HD+ resolution (1440 × 720), an 18:9 aspect ratio, and a pixel density of 295 ppi.

The smartphone is equipped with a 13 megapixel main wide-angle camera with an aperture of f/2.2 and phase-detection autofocus (PDAF), and an 8 MP wide-angle front-facing camera with an aperture of f/2.0. Both cameras are capable of recording video at 1080p resolution at 30fps.

=== Software ===
The Meizu M8c runs on Flyme 6.3, which is based on Android 7.1.2 Nougat.

== Reception ==
A reviewer from the information portal ITC.ua gave the Meizu M8c a score of 3.5 out of 5 stars. Listed disadvantages included performance, the small amount of internal storage, lack of 5 GHz Wi-Fi support, and a mediocre main speaker. Advantages noted were the display, good build quality, battery life, and affordable price.

The reviewer gave a conclusion, stating "Saving on components in budget smartphones noticeably affects the final result. The Meizu M8c is no exception; it struggles with resource-intensive tasks, and its cameras have difficulty shooting in the dark. However, it looks decent, is well-built, and has a high-quality display."
