= Meizu 20 Infinity =

2023 smartphone by Meizu

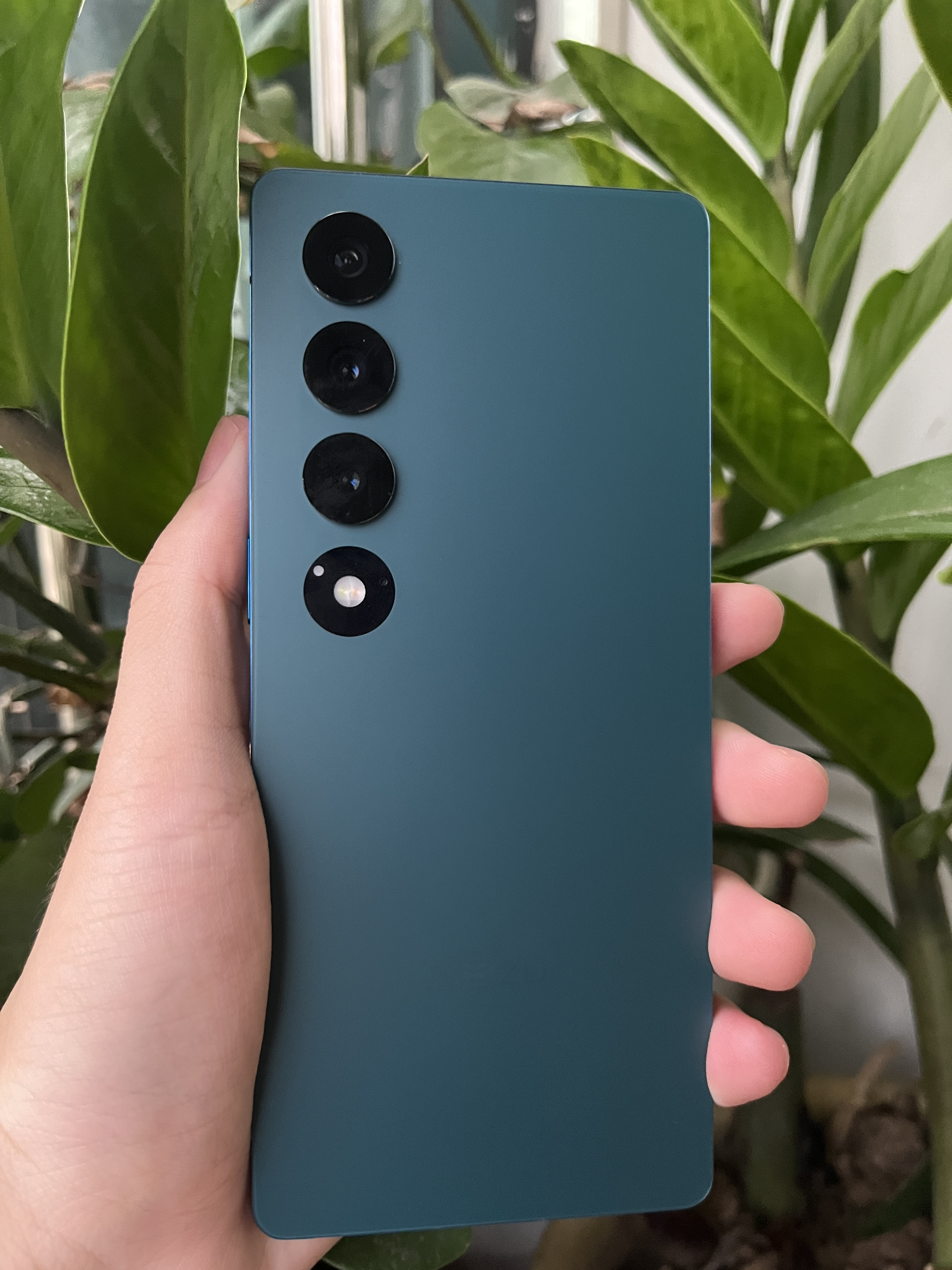
- Meizu 20 Infinity
- Developer: Meizu
- Manufacturer: Meizu
- Type: Smartphone
- Series: Meizu 20 Series
- First released: 12 June 2023; 3 years ago
- Successor: Meizu 21 Pro
- Related: Meizu 20; Meizu 20 Pro; Meizu 20 Classic
- Compatible networks: GSM / HSPA / LTE / 5G
- Form factor: Slate
- Colors: Gray; Green; Silver
- Dimensions: 163.4 mm × 73.3 mm × 8.2 mm (6.43 in × 2.89 in × 0.32 in)
- Weight: 215 g (7.6 oz)
- Operating system: Android 13 with Flyme 10
- System-on-chip: Qualcomm SM8550-AB Snapdragon 8 Gen 2 (4 nm)
- CPU: Octa-core (1x3.2 GHz Cortex-X3 & 2x2.8 GHz Cortex-A715 & 2x2.8 GHz Cortex-A710 & 3x2.0 GHz Cortex-A510)
- GPU: Adreno 740
- Memory: 12 GB or 16 GB RAM
- Storage: 256 GB, 512 GB, or 1 TB UFS 4.0
- SIM: Nano-SIM + Nano-SIM
- Battery: 4800 mAh Li-Po
- Charging: 65W wired; 50W wireless
- Rear camera: 50 MP, f/1.8, 23 mm (wide), PDAF, OIS; 12 MP, f/2.0, 50 mm (telephoto), PDAF, OIS, optical zoom; 12 MP, f/2.2, 13 mm (ultrawide), 122°; Rear: 8K, 4K, 1080p; gyro-EIS
- Front camera: 32 MP, f/2.4 (wide): Front: HDR, video recording supported
- Display: 6.79 in (172 mm) LTPO OLED, 1B colors 1368 × 3192 px @ 120 Hz; 600 nits (typ), 1800 nits (peak)
- Sound: Stereo speakers
- Connectivity: Wi-Fi 7 (802.11a/b/g/n/ac/6e/7); Bluetooth 5.3 (A2DP, LE); NFC; USB Type-C; GPS (L1+L5), GLONASS, BDS, Galileo; Ultra Wideband
- Other: Under-display optical fingerprint, accelerometer, gyro, proximity sensor, compass, barometer
- Website: www.meizu.com

Meizu 20 Infinity is a flagship Android smartphone manufactured by Meizu. It was announced on 30 March 2023 and released on 12 June 2023 as part of the Meizu 20 series. The phone won multiple design awards.

== Specifications ==
=== Display ===
The Meizu 20 Infinity features a 6.79-inch LTPO OLED display with a resolution of 1368 × 3192 pixels, a 21:9 aspect ratio, and a 120 Hz refresh rate. It supports 1 billion colors, has a typical brightness of 600 nits, and a peak brightness of 1800 nits.

=== Performance ===
The device is equipped with the Qualcomm SM8550-AB Snapdragon 8 Gen 2 chipset (4 nm), paired with either 12 GB or 16 GB of RAM. Storage options include 256 GB, 512 GB, and 1 TB, all using UFS 4.0. There is no support for expandable storage.

=== Camera ===
The rear camera system includes a 50 MP wide sensor (f/1.8, PDAF, OIS), a 12 MP telephoto lens (f/2.0, PDAF, OIS, optical zoom), and a 12 MP ultrawide lens (f/2.2, 122°). It supports 8K, 4K, and 1080p video recording with gyro-EIS. The front camera is 32 MP (f/2.4) with HDR support.

=== Battery ===
The phone is powered by a 4800 mAh non-removable Li-Po battery. Charging options include 65 W wired charging (PD PPS, QC4) and 50 W wireless charging.

=== Connectivity ===
Connectivity features include Wi-Fi 7, Bluetooth 5.3, NFC, USB Type-C, and positioning systems GPS (L1+L5), GLONASS, BDS, and Galileo. It also supports Ultra Wideband.

=== Sensors ===
The Meizu 20 Infinity includes an under-display optical fingerprint sensor, accelerometer, gyro, proximity sensor, compass, and barometer.
