= Meizu PRO 6 Plus =

Smartphone

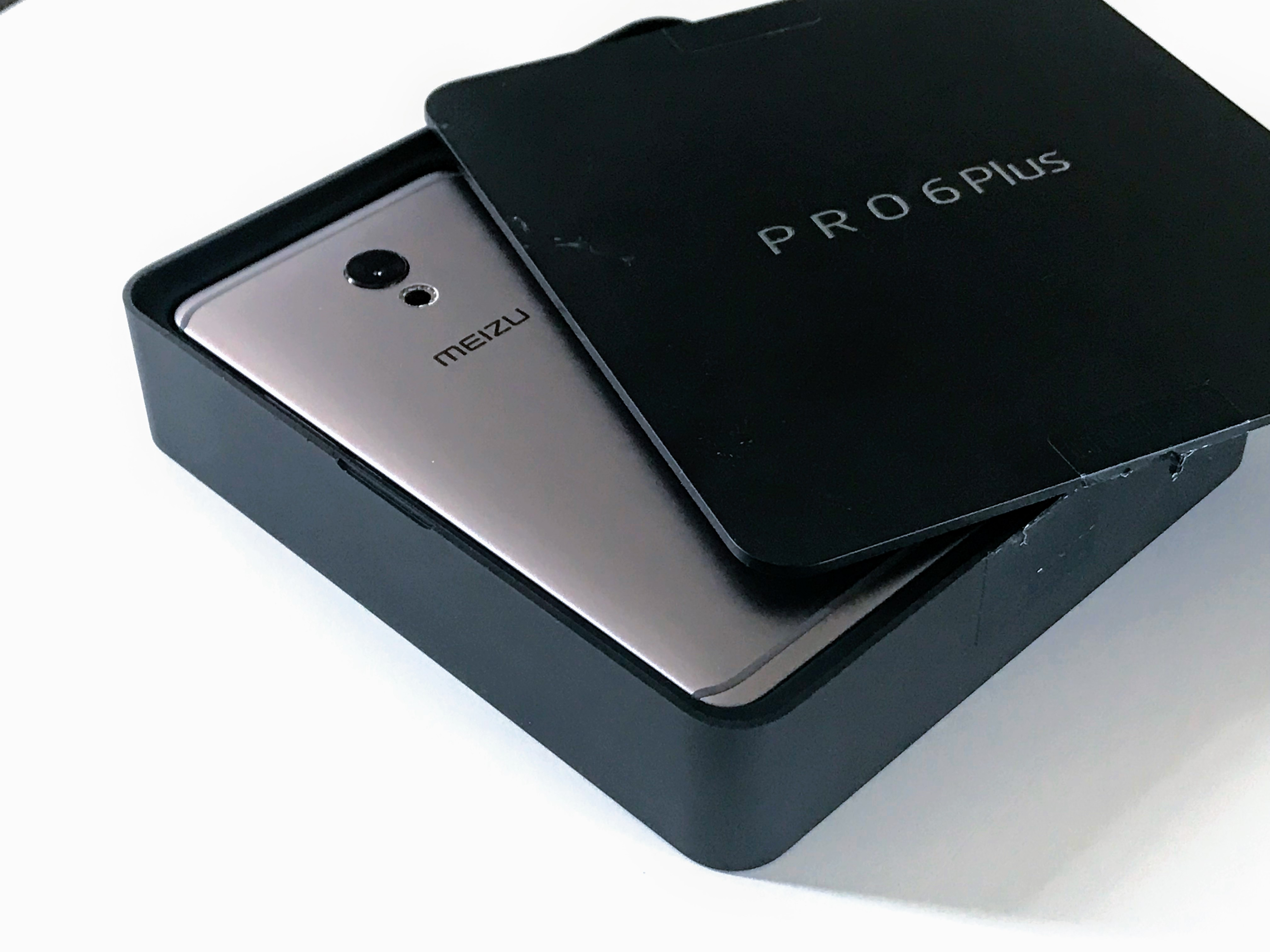
Meizu Pro 6 Plus

The Meizu PRO 6 Plus is a smartphone designed and produced by the Chinese manufacturer Meizu, which runs on Flyme OS, Meizu's modified Android operating system. It is the company's latest model of the flagship PRO series, succeeding the Meizu PRO 6. It was unveiled in November 2016.

The Meizu PRO 6 Plus was released with an updated version of Flyme OS, a modified operating system based on Android Lollipop. It features an alternative, flat design and improved one-handed usability.

== Hardware and design ==
The Meizu PRO 6 features a Samsung Exynos 8890 with an array of eight ARM Cortex CPU cores, an ARM Mali-T880 MP10 GPU for internal storage 64 GB and ARM Mali-T880 MP12 GPU for Internal Storage 128GB, both of them using RAM 4GB high speed LPDDR4 which scores a result of 110.000 points on the AnTuTu benchmark. The rear camera comes with 12 megapixels with ƒ / 2.0 large aperture while the front camera is 5 megapixels with ƒ / 2.0 aperture. Meizu PRO 6 Plus is a dual SIM smartphone that accepts . Connectivity options include Wi-Fi, GPS, Bluetooth, NFC and 4G. Sensors on the phone include Proximity sensor, Accelerometer and Ambient light sensor.

== Availability ==
Meizu PRO 6 Plus is available for sale since November 2016, Meizu selling mobile phone for online and Offline in some countries. Online sales in Asia, only two are India and Israel, Europe is in; France, Italy, Russia, Spain, Ukraine, United Kingdom, South America: Brazil; Oceania: New Zealand. While sales Offline served only at Brunie, Myanmar, Cambodia, New Zealand, and Sri Lanka.
