= Meizu 18 =

Smartphone series developed by Meizu

Meizu 18 Meizu 18 Pro Meizu 18s Meizu 18s Pro
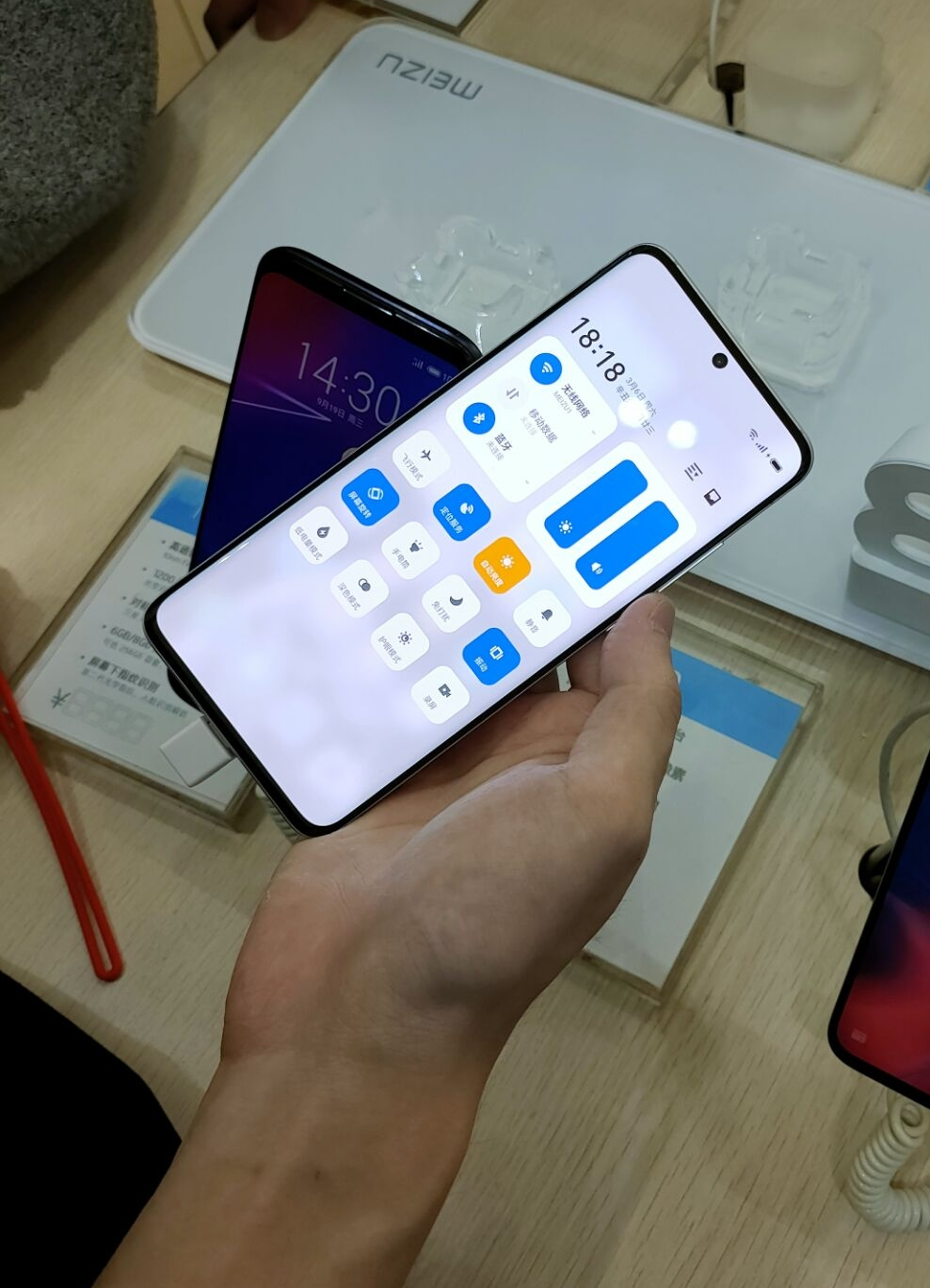
- Meizu 18 running Flyme 9
- Manufacturer: Meizu
- Type: 18/18s: Smartphone; 18 Pro/18s Pro: Phablet
- Series: Meizu
- First released: 18/Pro: March 3, 2021; 5 years ago 18s/18s Pro: September 22, 2021; 5 years ago
- Availability by region: China
- Predecessor: Meizu 17
- Successor: Meizu 20
- Related: Meizu 18X
- Compatible networks: GSM, 3G, 4G (LTE), 5G
- Form factor: Slate
- Colors: 18: Blue, white, pink 18s: Blue, white, pink, blue-pink 18 Pro/18s Pro: Blue, white, and gray
- Dimensions: 18/18s: 152.4 × 69.2 × 8.2 mm 18 Pro/18s Pro: 162.5 × 73 × 8.1 mm
- Weight: 18/18s: 162 g 18 Pro/18s Pro: 189 g
- Operating system: Initial: 18/Pro: Android 11 + Flyme 9; 18s/18s Pro: Android 11 + Flyme 9.2; Current: Android 13 + Flyme 10.5
- CPU: 18/Pro: Qualcomm Snapdragon 888 (5 nm); 18s/18s Pro: Qualcomm Snapdragon 888+ (5 nm); 8-core (1×2.84 GHz Kryo 680 & 3×2.42 GHz Kryo 680 & 4×1.8 GHz Kryo 680); 18s/18s Pro: 8-core (1×3 GHz Kryo 680 & 3×2.42 GHz Kryo 680 & 4×1.8 GHz Kryo 680)
- GPU: Adreno 660
- Memory: 8/12 GB, LPDDR5
- Storage: 128/256 GB, UFS 3.1
- SIM: Dual SIM
- Battery: All models: Non-removable, Li-Ion; 18/18s: 4000 mAh; 18 Pro/18s Pro: 4500 mAh
- Charging: 18: 36W fast charging, 40% in 15 min, 100% in 50 min (advertised); 18 Pro: 40W fast charging, 40% in 15 min, 100% in 50 min, 40W fast wireless charging, 10W reverse wireless charging 18s: 36W fast charging, 80% in 33 min, 100% in 50 min (advertised); 18s Pro: 40W fast charging, 40% in 15 min, 100% in 55 min, 40W fast wireless charging, 10W reverse wireless charging All models: Power Delivery 3.0, Quick Charge 4+
- Rear camera: 18/18s: 64 MP Sony IMX682, f/1.6, 26 mm (wide), 1/1.73", 0.8 µm, PDAF, OIS + 8 MP OmniVision OV08A10, f/2.4, 79 mm (telephoto), 1/4.4", 1.0 µm, PDAF, 3x optical zoom + 16 MP Samsung S5K3P9SX, f/2.2, 15 mm, 122˚ (ultrawide, macro), 1/3.0", 1.0 µm 18 Pro/18s Pro: 50 MP, f/1.9, 23 mm (wide), 1/1.31", 1.2 µm, dual pixel PDAF, OIS + 8 MP OmniVision OV08A10, f/2.4, 79 mm (telephoto), 1/4.4", 1.0 µm, PDAF, 3x optical zoom + 32 MP Sony IMX616, f/2.2, 15 mm, 122˚ (ultrawide, macro), 1/2.8", 0.8 µm + 0.3 MP Sony IMX616, f/1.4 (TOF 3D), 7.0 µm 2-LED dual-tone flash, HDR, panorama Video: 4K@30/60fps, 1080p@30/60fps; gyro-EIS, HDR (18s Pro)
- Front camera: 18/18s: 20 MP, f/2.2, 26 mm (wide), 1/3.4", 0.8 µm, AF; HDR; Video: 1080p@30fps 18 Pro/18s Pro: 44 MP, f/2.4, 26 mm (wide), 1/2.65", 0.7 µm, AF; HDR; Video: 4K@30fps, 1080p@30fps
- Display: 18/18s: 6.2", 563 ppi 18 Pro/18s Pro: 6.7", 526 ppi All models: Super AMOLED, 3200 × 1440 (WQHD+), 20:9, 3D Touch
- Connectivity: USB-C 2.0, Bluetooth 5 5.2 (A2DP, LE), NFC, Wi-Fi 802.11 b/g/n/ac/6e (dual-band, Wi-Fi Direct, hotspot), GPS, A-GPS, GLONASS, BeiDou, GALILEO, QZSS
- Made in: China
- Other: Fingerprint scanner (under-display, ultrasonic), accelerometer, gyroscope, proximity sensor, compass

The Meizu 18 and Meizu 18 Pro are flagship Android smartphones developed by Meizu. They were announced on March 3, 2021. On September 22 of the same year, the Meizu 18s and Meizu 18s Pro were introduced, featuring a more powerful processor as their primary upgrade.

== Design ==
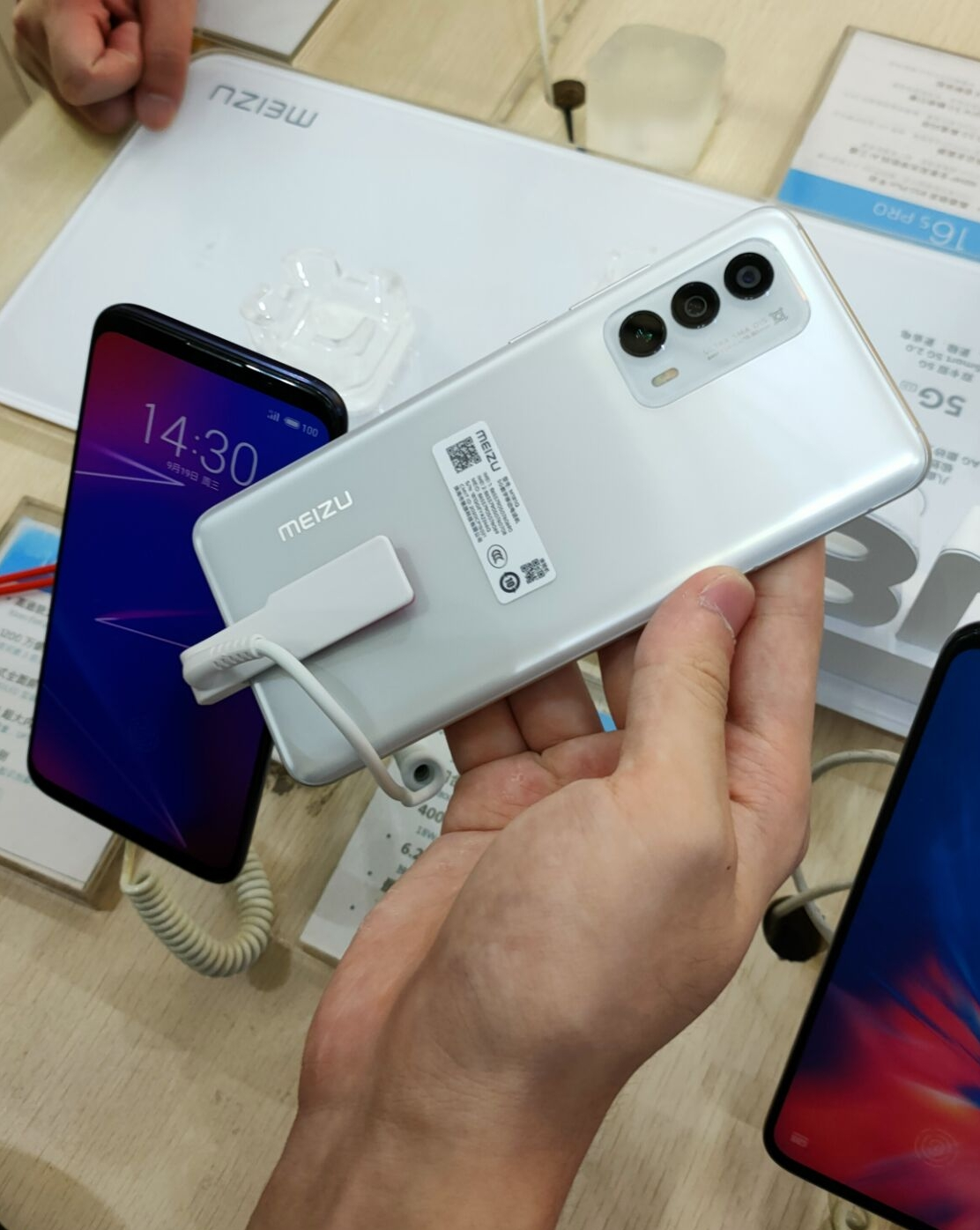
Rear panel of the Meizu 18 in white

The front display and rear panels of the devices are constructed out of glass, joined by an aluminum frame. The bottom houses a USB-C port, speaker, microphone, and a dual-SIM card slot. A second microphone is located at the top. The right side features the volume rocker and power button.

The Meizu 18 was available in three colors: Blue, white, and pink.

The Meizu 18s was available in four colors: Blue, white, pink, and blue-pink.

The Meizu 18 Pro and 18s Pro were available in three colors: Blue, white, and gray.

== Specifications ==
=== Hardware ===
The Meizu 18 and 18 Pro are powered by the Qualcomm Snapdragon 888 processor, while the Meizu 18s and 18s Pro utilize the Snapdragon 888+. All models are equipped with an Adreno 660 GPU. The smartphones are available in configurations of 8 GB or 12 GB of LPDDR5 RAM, alongside 128 GB or 256 GB of UFS 3.1 internal storage.

=== Battery ===
The Meizu 18 and 18s come equipped with a 4000 mAh battery supporting 36W fast charging. The Meizu 18 Pro and 18s Pro feature a larger 4500 mAh battery which supports 40W fast wired charging, 40W fast wireless charging, and 10W reverse wireless charging.

=== Camera ===
The Meizu 18 and 18s feature a triple rear camera setup: a 64 MP main lens (f/1.6, wide) with phase-detection autofocus (PDAF) and optical image stabilization (OIS); an 8 MP telephoto lens (f/2.4) supporting 3x optical zoom; and a 16 MP ultrawide lens (f/2.2) with a 122° field of view capable of macro photography. The front-facing camera has a 20 MP sensor (f/2.2, wide) capable of recording 1080p video at 30fps. The Meizu 18 Pro and 18s Pro feature a quad rear camera array: a 50 MP main lens (f/1.9, wide) with dual pixel PDAF and OIS; an 8 MP telephoto lens (f/2.4) with 3x optical zoom; a 32 MP ultrawide lens (f/2.2, 122° field of view) for ultra-wide and macro shots; and a 0.3 MP sensor (f/1.4) with a TOF 3D depth sensor. The front camera consists of a 44 MP sensor (f/2.4, wide) supporting 4K video recording at 30fps. Rear camera setups across all models support up to 4K video capture at 60fps.

=== Display ===
The Meizu 18 and 18s feature a 6.2-inch display with a pixel density of 563 ppi, while the 18 Pro and 18s Pro feature a 6.7-inch display at 526 ppi. All models use a curved Super AMOLED display panel with a resolution of 3400 × 1440 (WQHD+), a 20:9 aspect ratio, a 120 Hz refresh rate, and 3D Touch technology support. The display features a circular punch-hole cutout for the front camera centered at the top.

=== Software ===
The Meizu 18 and 18 Pro shipped originally with Flyme 9, whereas the Meizu 18s and 18s Pro debuted with Flyme 9.2, both operating systems built upon Android 11. All models were subsequently updated to Flyme 10.5 based on Android 13.
