= Meizu 18X =

Smarphone manufactured by Meizu

Meizu 18X (Gree Tosot G7)
- Brand: Meizu; Gree
- Manufacturer: Meizu
- Type: Phablet
- Series: Meizu / Tosot G
- First released: September 22, 2021; 4 years ago
- Availability by region: China
- Predecessor: Meizu 16Xs; Gree Tosot G5
- Successor: Meizu 21 Note
- Related: Meizu 18
- Compatible networks: GSM, 3G, 4G (LTE), 5G
- Form factor: Slate
- Dimensions: 165.1×76.35×7.99 mm (6.500×3.006×0.315 in)
- Weight: 189 g (7 oz)
- Operating system: Initial: Android 11 with Flyme 9.2; Current: Android 12 with Flyme 10.2
- System-on-chip: Qualcomm SM8250-AC Snapdragon 870 (7 nm)
- CPU: Octa-core (1x3.2 GHz Kryo 585 & 3x2.42 GHz Kryo 585 & 4x1.80 GHz Kryo 585)
- GPU: Adreno 650
- Memory: 8/12 GB LPDDR4X
- Storage: 128/256 GB UFS 3.1
- SIM: Dual SIM (Nano-SIM)
- Battery: Non-removable Li-Po 4300 mAh
- Charging: 30 W fast charging, 70% in 30 min, 100% in 60 min (advertised); Power Delivery 3.0, Quick Charge 4+
- Rear camera: 64 MP Samsung GW3, f/1.8, 26 mm (wide), 1/1.97", 0.7 µm, PDAF + 8 MP Hynix Hi846, f/2.2, 15 mm, 120˚ (ultrawide), 1/4.0", 1.12 µm + 2 MP BF2253L, f/2.4 (depth); LED flash, HDR, panorama Video: 8K@30fps, 4K@30/60fps, 1080p@30/60fps; gyro-EIS
- Front camera: 13 MP, f/2.0 (wide); HDR; Video: 1080p@30fps
- Display: OLED, 6.67", 2400 × 1080 (Full HD+), 20:9, 395 ppi
- Connectivity: USB-C 2.0, Bluetooth 5.2 (A2DP, LE), Wi-Fi 802.11 b/g/n/ac/6e (dual-band, Wi-Fi Direct, hotspot), GPS, A-GPS, GLONASS, BeiDou, Galileo
- Made in: China
- Other: Fingerprint (under display, optical), accelerometer, gyroscope, proximity sensor, compass

The Meizu 18X is a mid-range smartphone developed and manufactured by Meizu. It was announced on September 22, 2021 as a successor to the Meizu 16Xs along with the Meizu 18s and Meizu 18s Pro. Also, it was launched on September 26, 2021 in China and in November 2021, it was released and re-branded by Gree as the Gree Tosot G7.

== Design & Display ==
The back panel is made of glass, which is identical to the iPhone 13.

The wordmark differs from the brand's main camera:

- Meizu 18X - "18X Dark Vision"
- Tosot G7 - "64MP Matrix AI Camera"

It was available in Light Blue, White, and Gray colors.

With a dimension of 165.1 x 76.35 x 7.99mm, it features a 10-bit OLED display sizing at 6.67 inches with 120Hz refresh rate, 360Hz touch sampling rate, and a resolution of 1080 x 2400 px (Full HD+; 20:9 ratio; 395 ppi).

== Technical specifications ==
=== Hardware ===
The 18X is powered by a Qualcomm Snapdragon 870 processor and an Adreno 650 graphics processor. It also has a battery with a capacity of 4300 mAh and supports 30W fast charging.

The 18X features a main triple camera of 64MP (f/1.8) wide-angle with PDAF, 8MP (f/2.2) ultra-wide (viewing angle of 120°) lens and 2MP (f/2.4) depth sensor, with recording videos up to either 1080p @ 30/60fps, 4K @ 30/60fps or 8K 30fps. The front camera has a resolution of 13MP (f/2.0) wide-angle with recording videos up to 1080p @ 30fps. The 18X is sold in 8/128, 8/256 and 12/256 GB internal memory configurations.

=== Software ===
The Meizu 18X runs on Flyme 9.2, while the Gree Tosot G7 runs on HALO UI 6.0. Both UIs are based on Android 11. They were upgraded to Flyme 10 and HALO UI 7.0, respectively, based on Android 12.
