= Meizu M3S =

Smartphone

- Manufacturer: Meizu
- Type: Touchscreen smartphone
- Series: Meizu M Series
- First released: June 13, 2015; 11 years ago
- Predecessor: Meizu M1 Metal
- Successor: Meizu M5S
- Compatible networks: GSM, UMTS, HSPA, LTE
- Dimensions: 141.9 mm (5.59 in) H 69.9 mm (2.75 in) W 8.3 mm (0.33 in) D
- Weight: 138 g (4.9 oz)
- Operating system: Flyme OS, based on Android 5.1 Lollipop
- System-on-chip: MediaTek MTK MT6750
- CPU: Octa-core (4x1.5GHz Cortex-A53, 4x1.0GHz Cortex-A53)
- GPU: ARM Mali-T860 MP2
- Memory: 2 GB or 3 GB LPDDR3
- Storage: 16 GB or 32 GB flash memory
- Removable storage: microSD slot (up to 256 GB)
- Battery: 3020 mAh Li-Ion rechargeable battery, not replaceable
- Rear camera: 13.0 MP, PDAF autofocus, ƒ/2.2 aperture, LED flash, 1080p30 recording
- Front camera: 5.0 MP, ƒ/2.0 aperture
- Display: 5.0 inch diagonal IPS; 720x1280 px (296 ppi)
- Connectivity: 3.5 mm TRS connector, Bluetooth 4.0 with BLE, Dual-band WiFi (802.11 a/b/g/n)
- Data inputs: Multi-touch capacitive touchscreen, A-GPS, GLONASS, Accelerometer, Gyroscope, Proximity sensor, Digital compass, Ambient light sensor
- Other: Dual SIM support with dual standby mode

The Meizu M3S is a smartphone designed and produced by the Chinese manufacturer Meizu, which runs on Flyme OS, Meizu's modified Android operating system. It is a current model of the M series. It was unveiled on June 13, 2016 in Beijing.

== History ==
On May 25, 2016 it has been reported that a new Meizu device has been certified by the Chinese telecommunication authority TENAA, the Chinese equivalent to the American Federal Communications Commission. According to the certification information, the new device should feature a 5-inch display with a resolution of 720 by 1280 pixels.

In the beginning of June 2016, there were statements on Chinese social media that the upcoming device could be called Meizu M3S. Furthermore, a launch event for the new device on June 13, 2016, was announced.

=== Release ===
As announced, the M3S was released in Beijing on June 13, 2016.

Pre-orders for the M3S began after the launch event on June 13, 2016.

== Features ==
=== Flyme ===
The Meizu M3S was released with an updated version of Flyme OS, a modified operating system based on Android Lollipop. It features an alternative, flat design and improved one-handed usability.

=== Hardware and design ===
The Meizu M3S features a MediaTek MTK 6750 system-on-a-chip with an array of eight ARM Cortex-A53 CPU cores, an ARM Mali-T860 MP2 GPU and 2 GB or 3 GB of RAM. The M3S reaches a score of 38451 points on the AnTuTu benchmark.

The M3S is available in four different colors (grey, silver, champagne gold and rose gold) and comes with either 2 GB of RAM and 16 GB of internal storage or 3 GB of RAM and 32 GB of internal storage.

The Meizu M3S has a full-metal body, which measures 141.9 mm (5.59 in) x 69.9 mm (2.75 in) x 8.3 mm (0.33 in) and weighs 138 g (4.9 oz). It has a slate form factor, being rectangular with rounded corners and has only one central physical button at the front. Unlike most other Android smartphones, the M3S doesn't have capacitive buttons nor on-screen buttons. The functionality of these keys is implemented using a technology called mBack, which makes use of gestures with the physical button. The M3S further extends this button by a fingerprint sensor called mTouch.

The M3S features a fully laminated 5-inch IPS multi-touch capacitive touchscreen display with a HD resolution of 720 by 1080 pixels. The pixel density of the display is 293 ppi.

In addition to the touchscreen input and the front key, the device has volume/zoom control buttons and the power/lock button on the right side, a 3.5mm TRS audio jack on the top and a microUSB (Micro-B type) port on the bottom for charging and connectivity.

The Meizu M3S has two cameras. The rear camera has a resolution of 13 MP, a ƒ/2.2 aperture, a 5-element lens, phase-detection autofocus and an LED flash. The front camera has a resolution of 5 MP, a ƒ/2.0 aperture and a 4-element lens.

=== Camera ===
The Meizu M3s features a 13 MP main camera with an f/2.2 aperture and phase detection autofocus (PDAF). It is capable of recording videos in 1080p resolution at 30 frames per second. The phone has a 5 MP front-facing camera with an f/2.0 aperture.

== See also ==
- Meizu
