= Meizu M5 =

Smartphone

- Manufacturer: Meizu
- Type: Touchscreen smartphone
- Series: Meizu M Series
- First released: October 31, 2016; 9 years ago
- Predecessor: Meizu M3
- Successor: Meizu M6
- Compatible networks: GSM, UMTS, HSPA, LTE
- Dimensions: 147.2 mm (5.80 in) H 72.8 mm (2.87 in) W 8 mm (0.31 in) D
- Weight: 138 g (4.9 oz)
- Operating system: Before: Flyme OS 5.2.10.0G, based on Android 6.0 Marshmallow Now: Flyme OS 6.3.1.0G, based on Android 6.0 Marshmallow
- System-on-chip: MT6750 processor
- CPU: ARM® Cortex®-A53™ 1.5GHz x4 + ARM® Cortex®-A53™ 1.0GHz x4
- GPU: ARM Mali-T860
- Memory: 2/3 GB LPDDR3
- Storage: 16 or 32 GB flash memory
- Removable storage: microSD
- SIM: Dual SIM
- Battery: 3070 mAh Li-Ion rechargeable battery, not replaceable
- Rear camera: 13 MP, PDAF autofocus, ƒ/2.2 aperture, LED flash, 1080p@30fps video recording
- Front camera: 5.0 MP, ƒ/2.0 aperture
- Display: 5.2 inch diagonal TDDI; 1280x720 px (282 ppi)
- Connectivity: 3.5 mm TRS connector, Bluetooth 4.0 with BLE, Dual-band WiFi (802.11 a/b/g/n)
- Data inputs: Multi-touch capacitive touchscreen, GPS, A-GPS, GLONASS, BDS, Accelerometer, Gyroscope, Proximity sensor, Digital compass, Ambient light sensor
- Other: Dual SIM support with dual standby mode, 3D Press force touch technology, Infrared proximity sensor, gyroscope, ambient light sensor

The Meizu M5 is a smartphone designed and produced by the Chinese manufacturer Meizu, which runs on Flyme OS, Meizu's modified Android operating system. It was the successor of the Meizu M3 Max though its true predecessor is the Meizu M3. It was unveiled on December 6, 2016 in Beijing.

== History ==
On September 5, 2016, Meizu officially launched the M3 Max in Beijing.

Later in October, Meizu announced and unveiled the M5, targeted at budget conscious consumers looking for a decent mid-range device.

=== Release ===
Pre-orders for the M5 began after the launch event on October 31, 2016. Sales in mainland China began in November 2016.

== Features ==
=== Flyme ===
The M5 was released with Flyme OS version 5.2.10G, a modified operating system based on Android Marshmallow. It is updated to Flyme OS 6.3.1.0G, based on Android Marshmallow.

=== Hardware and design ===
The Meizu M5 features a MT6750 octa-core processor with an array of ten ARM Cortex CPU cores, an ARM Mali-T860 GPU and 2/3 GB of RAM.

The Meizu M5 has a plastic body, which measures 147.2 mm (5.80 in) x 72.8 mm (2.87 in) x 8 mm (0.31 in) and weighs 138 g (4.9 oz). It has a slate form factor, being rectangular with rounded corners and has only one central physical button at the front.

Unlike most other Android smartphones, the M5 doesn't have capacitive buttons nor on-screen buttons. The functionality of these keys is implemented using a technology called mBack, which makes use of gestures with the physical button. This button also includes a fingerprint sensor called mTouch similar to predecessors.

The haptic technology 3D Press that debuted on the Meizu M3, which allows the user to perform a different action by pressing the touchscreen instead of tapping, also features on the M5.

The M5 is available in three different colours (blue, matte black and champagne gold) and comes with either 16 or 32 GB of internal storage.

The M5 features a 5.2-inch Super AMOLED multi-touch capacitive touchscreen display with a (FHD resolution of 1280 by 720 pixels. The pixel density of the display is 282 ppi.

In addition to the touchscreen input and the front key, the device has a volume/zoom control and the power/lock button on the right side and a 3.5mm TRS audio jack.

Just like its predecessor, it uses USB-C for both data connectivity and charging.

The M5 has two cameras. The rear camera has a resolution of 13 MP, a ƒ/2.0 aperture. Furthermore, the phase-detection autofocus of the rear camera is laser-supported. The front camera has a resolution of 5 MP, a ƒ/2.0 aperture and a 5-element lens.

=== Camera ===
The Meizu M5 features a 13 MP main camera with an f/2.2 aperture and phase detection autofocus (PDAF). It's capable of recording video at 1080p resolution at 30 frames per second. The phone has a 5 MP front-facing camera with an f/2.0 aperture, which also records 1080p video at 30 fps.

== Reception ==
The M5 received favourable reviews. Forbes praised the pricing in a piece titled "At Just $100, This Might Be The Best Budget Phone" whilst also praising the design saying "...though the body, unlike other Meizu phones, isn't made of metal but plastic, it's still a solidly constructed phone, with smooth edges/corners and zero camera hump".

== See also ==
- Meizu
- Meizu M3
- Meizu M3 Max
