= Meizu =

Chinese consumer electronics manufacturer

Hubei Xingji Meizu Group Co., Ltd.

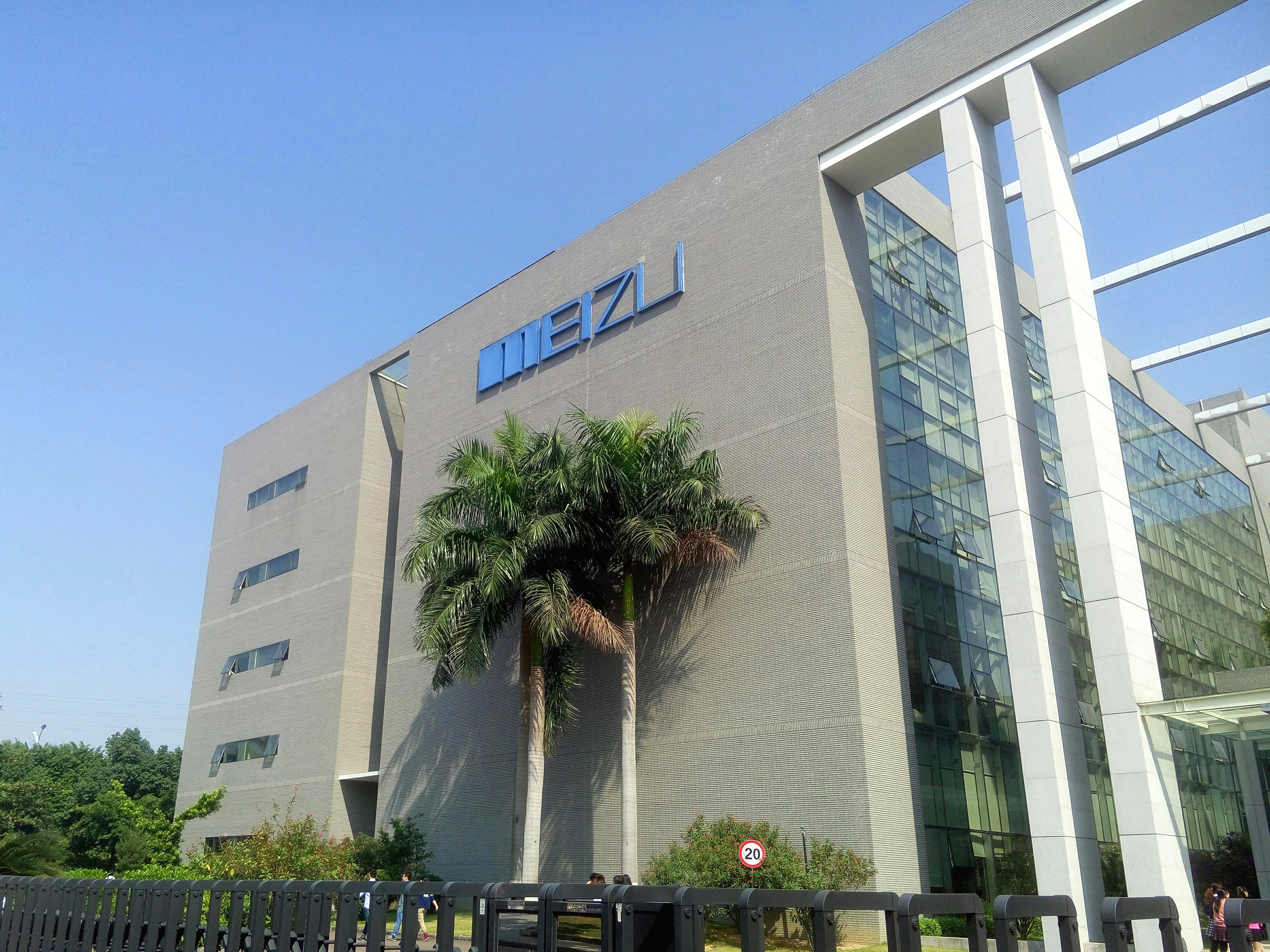
- Meizu headquarters in Zhuhai, Guangdong
- Native name: 魅族科技有限公司
- Type: Private
- Industry: Consumer electronics
- Founded: 2003; 23 years ago
- Founder: Jack Wong
- Headquarters: Zhuhai, Guangdong, China
- Area served: China; Hong Kong; Russia; Ukraine; Indonesia; India; Kazakhstan
- Key people: Li Shufu (Founder & Chairman); SU Jing (CEO); LIAO Qinghong (COO); QI Weimin (CFO); ZhangYadong (EVP&CTO); HUANG Zhipan (EVP & President of Smartphone Bu); WANG Yong (EVP & Head of Strategic Planning)
- Products: XR, smart car
- Revenue: ▲US$ 451.5 million (2013)
- Net income: ▼US$ -1.47 billion (2015)
- Owner: Geely (2022-present)
- Number of employees: ▼868 (2019)
- Subsidiaries: DreamSmart (StarElite or DreamSmart Online, previously Xingji Meizu); PΛNDΛER
- Website: www.meizu.com

Meizu
- Chinese: 魅族科技有限公司
- Literal meaning: Meizu Technology Co., Ltd
Transcriptions
Standard Mandarin
- Hanyu Pinyin: Mèizú Kējì Yǒuxiàn Gōngsī

‌Meizu (sometimes stylized in all caps) is a technology company registered in Zhuhai, China. Its predecessor, Meizu Technology, was founded by Huang Zhang in 2003 and was famous for its MP3 player and smartphone business in the early days. In July 2022, Geely Holding Group completed the strategic acquisition of 79.09% of Meizu Technology's equity through its subsidiary DreamSmart, and the actual control of the company was transferred to the Geely system. In March 2023, DreamSmart and Meizu Technology completed the organizational merger and officially established DreamSmart Meizu Group. Shen Ziyu served as the chairman and CEO of DreamSmart Meizu Group, marking the transition of Meizu from independent operation to the core component of Geely's intelligent ecological chain.

The company's current business covers consumer electronics, smart car technology and extended reality (XR) fields, focusing on the development of smartphones (Meizu brand), in-vehicle systems (Flyme Auto) and AR devices.

== History ==
Meizu logo from 2003 to 2015

Jack Wong (Chinese: 黄章; pinyin: Huáng Zhāng) established Meizu in 2003. Initially a manufacturer of MP3 players, Meizu released their first MP4 player in 2006. Their most notable MP4 player was the M6 Mini Player, which was also marketed by Dane-Elec outside China.

In January 2007, Meizu announced their first smartphone, Meizu M8, which was fully released in April 2007. The Meizu M8 ran on the Mymobile operating system, based on Microsoft Windows CE 6.0. The design of the M8 was based on existing smartphone technology, such as Apple's iPhone. Meizu was subsequently sued by Apple due to theft of Apple's intellectual property of the original iPhone. An upgraded version of the Meizu M8, the Meizu M8SE, was released on 2 October 2009.

On 1 January 2011, the company released the Meizu M9, their first smartphone based on the Android operating system. This device was considered to be a large commercial success in China.

Meizu opened their first branch office outside mainland China in Hong Kong in 2011. Later that year, they also opened a branch office in Russia.

The Meizu MX was released on 1 January 2012, exactly one year after the M9. It was the first smartphone to feature Meizu's Flyme OS, a deeply customized version of Android. It was the first Meizu phone officially released outside mainland China, being released in Hong Kong at the same time. A quad-core version of the Meizu MX was released in June 2012.

In December 2012, the Meizu MX2 was released. It runs on Flyme OS 2.0 based on Android 4.1 Jelly Bean. The phone was produced by Foxconn and went on sale in mainland China, Hong Kong, Russia and Israel.

The Meizu MX3 was released in October 2013 and was the first smartphone to have 128GB of internal storage. On 6 March 2014, Meizu held a product launch of the Meizu MX3 in France, announcing that it would go on sale there soon. Meizu also expanded to Italy and Eastern Europe in 2014.

Meizu announced the Meizu MX4 on 2 September 2014. It was the first Meizu smartphone to feature a MediaTek processor and LTE support. The Meizu MX4 was the first Meizu smartphone to also offer Alibaba's Yun OS aside from Meizu's Flyme OS for the mainland Chinese market. Later that year, the Meizu MX4 Pro was announced, featuring a Samsung Exynos octa-core processor and a 2K+ screen.

In December 2014, Meizu announced the M series of products, with the first product being the Meizu M1 Note. The M-series of Meizu devices focus on bringing powerful features for a relatively low price. In January 2015, Meizu released the second installment in the M series of products, the Meizu M1.

Meizu logo from 2015 to 2023

On 2 June 2015, Meizu announced the successor to the Meizu M1 Note, the Meizu M2 Note. It features a physical home button and a new MediaTek octa-core processor, among some other upgraded features. After the Meizu M2 Note, is announced the Meizu M2. It features the same physical home button, and a MediaTek 6753 Octa-Core processor. It comes with Flyme OS 4.5 preinstalled.

The successor to the Meizu MX4 was announced on 30 June 2015, during a large launch event in Beijing and is called the Meizu MX5. During that event, Meizu also announced their first powerbank and virtual reality headset.

Meizu launched the new flagship series named PRO series in September 2015 by announcing the Meizu PRO 5. This device was also later showcased at MWC 2016 and eventually commercially released in February 2016 as an alternative edition named Meizu PRO 5 Ubuntu Edition running the Ubuntu Touch operating system.

The Meizu PRO 6, the successor to the PRO 5, was unveiled on 13 April 2016. It features a 10-core Helio X25 SoC, 4 GB of RAM and a 5.2-inch screen.

Meizu further extended its portfolio of M series products by releasing the Meizu M3S, Meizu M3 Note, Meizu M3E and Meizu M3 Max in 2016. The current device of the MX series is the Meizu MX6, which was released on 19 July 2016. Recently, Meizu seems to be geared up for a new smartphone called Meizu M4. Although the company has not put a word about this mobile, the alleged upcoming smartphone has been spotted on TENAA certification.

On 22 April 2018, Meizu released Meizu 15 series to celebrate their 15th anniversary.

In April 2019, the Meizu 16s was announced with Snapdragon 855 SoC and in-display fingerprint scanner.

On 8 May 2020, Meizu released Meizu 17 with Qualcomm Snapdragon 865 mobile platform, supplemented by the highest LPDDR5 specification high-speed memory as well as UFS3.1 flash memory.

On 8 July 2020 Meizu changed its theme color from #00b3ff (0, 180, 255) to #008cff (0, 140, 255).

On 13 June 2022, China's market regulatory authorities announced that Meizu Technology Co., Ltd. was acquired by Hubei Xingji Times Technology Co., Ltd., which is affiliated to Geely Holding Group, with a 79.09% stake, making the latter the largest shareholder and actual controller of Meizu.

In December 2022, the shareholders of Zhuhai Meizu Technology Co., Ltd. changed. Meizu Technology founder Huang Zhang and other shareholders withdrew from Meizu Technology. Wuhan Xingji Meizu Technology Co., Ltd., controlled by Geely Group Chairman Li Shufu, became the sole shareholder.

On 30 November 2023, Meizu announced their venture into electric vehicles (EVs) with the DreamCar MX. On the same day, Meizu shared a brief Weibo post teasing the Dreamcar MX as well as the launch of a new DreamCar co-creation programme arriving in Q1 2024, allowing users to express many customisation aspects such as exterior paint, interior colour matching and Flyme Auto themes.

On 18 February 2024, Meizu announced their decision to exit the traditional smartphone industry in an effort to move towards an "All in AI" centric focus over the next 3 years. Meizu's android flavour "FlymeOS" will also transition to focus on terminal devices such as vehicle infotainment systems for Geely. Meizu Announcement.

In May 2024, DreamSmart Group will fully upgrade its smart ecosystem and launch the Flyme AIOS operating system with deep AI capabilities. It will also release flagship models, smart noise-cancelling headphones, AR glasses and trendy accessories.

== Flyme ==
Flyme OS
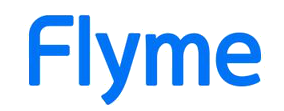
- Developer: Meizu
- Stable release: 12.6.0.0A / 30 June 2026; 3 months ago
- Operating system: Android
- Website: flyme.com

Flyme is a stock and aftermarket firmware developed by Meizu for smartphones based on the Android operating system. Some of its key features are completely redesigned apps, one-handed usability and performance optimizations. The current version of Flyme features distinguished flat design, various optimizations for performance. Flyme also has a feature called mBack, which is specific for Meizu smartphones. It allows easier navigation using only one physical button without on-screen navigation buttons. The back button function is implemented by tapping the physical button, while the home button function is used by pressing the physical button. The overview of recent application, which is on regular Android devices usually triggered by touching or tapping a dedicated button, can be viewed by swiping upwards from beneath the display.

The initial version, Flyme 1.0 based on Android 4.0.3 "Ice Cream Sandwich" was released for the Meizu MX on 12 June 2012, and later for the Meizu M9. It was praised by critics for its simple yet beautiful interface design.

Flyme 2.0 was released later in 2012 together with the Meizu MX2. It brought improved cloud services and built-in root support, among other improvements.

Flyme 3.0 was released together with the Meizu MX3 and later for the Meizu MX2. It was one of the first Android firmware releases to integrate a flat UI. Since Flyme 3.0, Dirac HD Sound is integrated, bringing an improved audio experience through a certain number of ear and headphones.

The successor of Flyme 3.0, Flyme 4.0 was released in 2014, initially for the Meizu MX4. It was the first Flyme firmware to be made available on non-Meizu devices. Eventually, it was officially released for devices from Samsung, Sony, LG and HTC. Fans also ported it to other devices, including ZTE, Huawei and the OnePlus One. Flyme 4.5 is based on Android Lollipop and comes standard with the Meizu M2, Meizu M2 Note and Meizu MX5. It was also made available for the Meizu MX4, Meizu MX4 Pro and Meizu M1 Note.

Flyme 5 is based on either Android Lollipop or Android Marshmallow depending on the device. For Meizu devices, Flyme uses different editions for international devices ("G" release) and mainland Chinese devices ("A" release).

Flyme 6.1.3 based on Android Nougat, which is now available only for Meizu Pro 7. Flyme 6.1.0 is the most popular Flyme 6 version available for Meizu Pro 6 Plus, M3 Max, MX6 and other devices.

Flyme 7, based on Android Nougat and later, launched alongside the Meizu 15 series.

Flyme 8, based on Android Pie, launched alongside the Meizu 16s Pro on 28 August 2019.

Flyme 9, based on Android 11, launched alongside the Meizu 18 series on 3 March 2021.

Flyme 10.5, based on Android 13, launched alongside the Meizu 21 on 30 November 2023.

Flyme has also been ported by the community to other devices as well: ZTE, Huawei, OnePlus 2, OnePlus 3, HTC One M9, HTC One (M8), HTC One (M7) and other devices.

=== Flyme AIOS ===
Flyme AIOS is the successor of Flyme, focusing heavily on AI features, ecosystem and ease of use. It redesigns elements such as the control center, lockscreen and made the system feel smoother to use.

Flyme AIOS 1, based on Android 14 was released in 2024 rolling out for the Meizu 21 series as well as the Meizu 20 series. Adding multiple functions to Aicy assistant such as generating AI contents, large model integration, phone assistant, call summaries. It also added more customizations to the lockscreen such as depth effect, wallpaper effect, full screen AOD and live music. Preinstalled apps have also gone through a massive redesign with refined icons, padding and a more mature design language overall.

Flyme AIOS 2, based on Android 15, launched along side the Meizu Note 16 series on 13 May 2025 and the Meizu 22 on 19 September 2025. It focuses on more AI features with deep integration into apps like Notes, Calendar. There are also more clock options to choose on the lockscreen, more refinements in apps and optimizations to the system.

PolestarOS, based on Flyme AIOS 1 for the Polestar Phone, a rebranded version of the Meizu 21 Pro. It has deeper connections with Polestar's vehicles; it also comes with a unique icon pack.

== Flyme Auto ==
Flyme Auto is an intelligent cockpit operating system developed by Xingji Meizu Group (a subsidiary of Geely). It is an extension of Meizu's Flyme OS designed specifically for automotive infotainment systems. The system debuted in 2023 and is a core component of Geely's "One Geely" smart ecosystem strategy.

Architecture

Built on a unified AI OS architecture, Flyme Auto 2.0 (released 21 August 2025) utilizes the Xingrui Intelligent Computing Center to provide 23.5 EFLOPS of cloud computing power. [1][4]

Key Features

- Flyme Link: Allows seamless "hardware sharing" between smartphones and the car. Apps run on the phone but display natively on the car screen with zero installation. [1]
- Aisyah/Eva AI: An intelligent, "hyper-anthropomorphic" voice assistant that controls vehicle hardware (windows, HVAC, etc.). [4]
- Ecosystem: Supports both Apple CarPlay and Android Auto (added via OTA 1.2.0 in late 2025).

Notable Vehicle Integrations:

- Proton e.MAS 7: The first Proton model to feature the system globally. [2]
- Lynk & Co 08 & 10 EM-P: The primary launch vehicles for the platform. [4]
- Geely Galaxy M9: The flagship SUV featuring Flyme Auto 2.0. [4]
- Polestar: Announced in 2023 for the Chinese market. [5]

== Meizu in India ==
Meizu entered the Indian market for the first time with its Meizu M1 Note smartphone on 20 May 2015, and after the success of M1 Note, they came up with Meizu M2 and Meizu M2 Note in India in June 2015. These were the budget range smartphones, where Meizu M2 released for ₹6,999 and Meizu M2 Note for ₹9,999.

Meizu released many other models such as Meizu M3 Note, Meizu MX4, Meizu MX5, Meizu U10, Meizu U20, and many others. Meizu was having online marketing where they partnered with Amazon and Flipkart. Among these many products, Meizu M2, Meizu M2 Note, and Meizu M3 Note were the biggest hits. After the lack of sales, they quit Indian Market by releasing their last smartphone, Meizu Pro 7.

During this market period, Meizu was having an official dedicated Flyme OS firmware for India.

After a long time Meizu re-launched in India with total 3 smartphones, 2 were budget range smartphones and 1 was a premium flagship phone. The budget phones were Meizu C9 and Meizu M6T, the premium one was Meizu 16 (also known as Meizu 16th).

This time Meizu started selling both online and offline.

== Meizu in Russia ==
Meizu Technology first sold the M9 model in Russia and the CIS countries in 2011. After withdrawing from the market in 2019, DreamSmart Group brought the Meizu smartphone brand back to the Russian market. In the fall of 2024, Meizu launched the latest generation of entry-level and mid-range smartphones to the Russian market, including the Meizu Note 21 series and the Meizu mblu 21.

== Products ==
=== Smartphones ===
==== pre-MX series ====
- Meizu M8
- Meizu M9
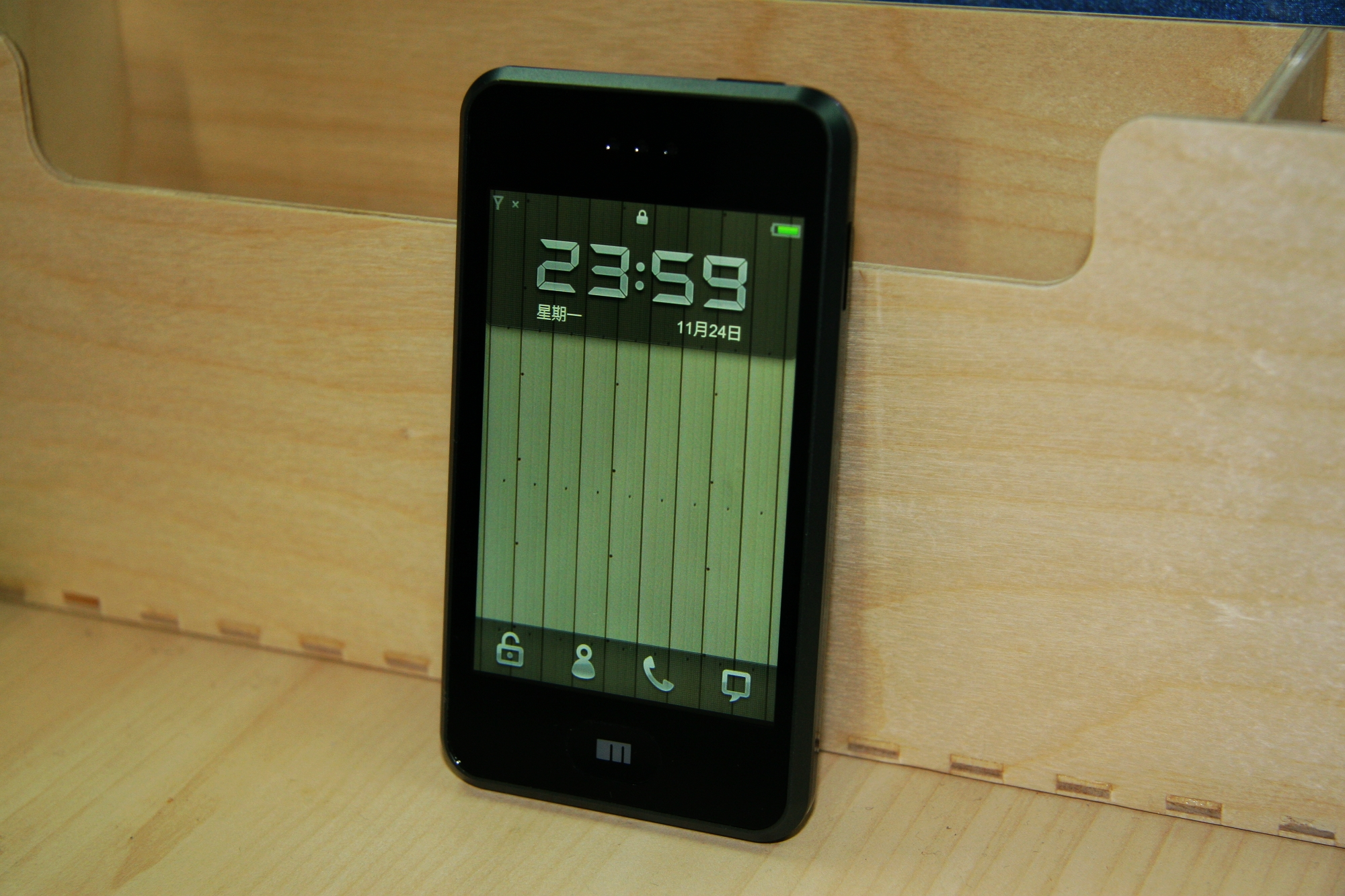
Meizu M8

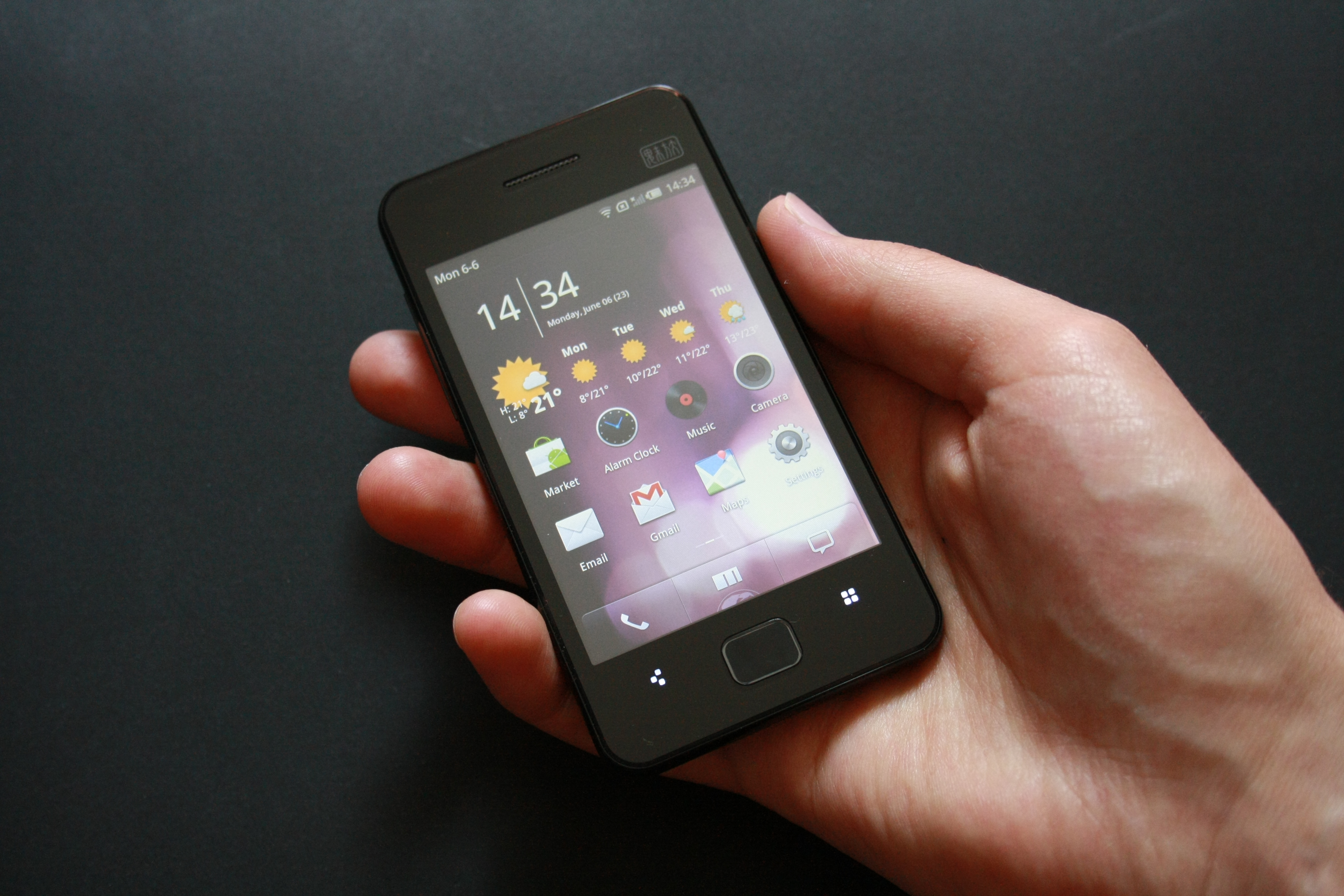
Meizu M9

==== MX series ====
The MX series is a series of smartphones targeted for users wanting a device positioned between the general mid-range devices and top-of-the-line flagship devices.

- Meizu MX
- Meizu MX2
- Meizu MX3
- Meizu MX4
  - Meizu MX4 Ubuntu Edition
  - Meizu MX4 Pro
- Meizu MX5
- Meizu MX6
Meizu MX

==== PRO series ====
The PRO series was introduced at the launch of the Meizu PRO 5 as a successor to the Meizu MX4 Pro. It represents Meizu's line of flagship devices for users seeking powerful devices with high performance.

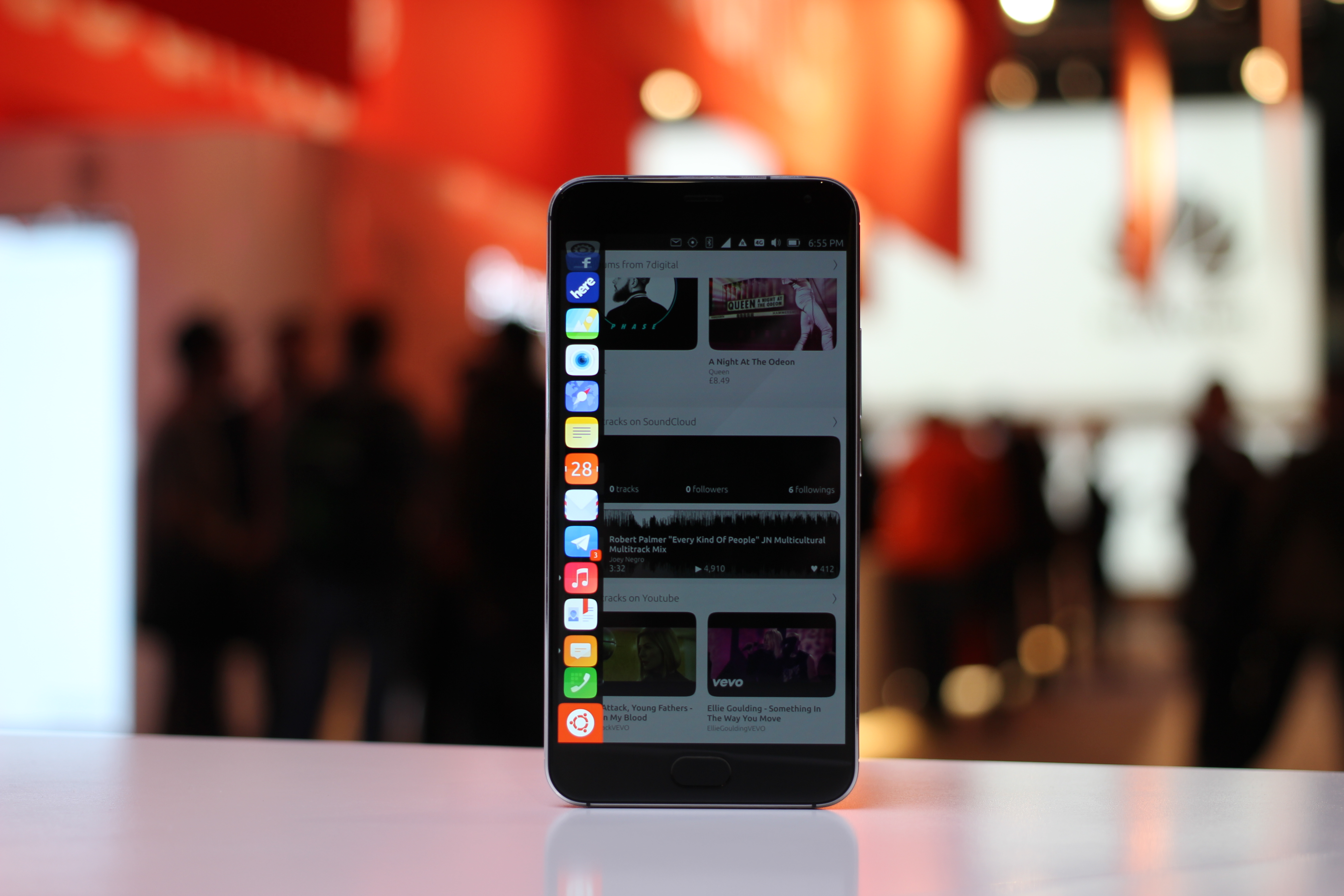
Meizu Pro 5

- Meizu PRO 5
  - Meizu PRO 5 Ubuntu Edition
- Meizu PRO 6
  - Meizu PRO 6s
  - Meizu PRO 6 Plus
- Meizu PRO 7
  - Meizu PRO 7 Plus

==== M series ====
The M series is a series of smartphones targeted for users wanting an affordable and functional smartphone.

- Meizu M1
  - Meizu M1 Note
- Meizu M2
  - Meizu M2 Note
- Meizu M3
  - Meizu M3E
  - Meizu M3s
  - Meizu M3 Max
  - Meizu M3 Note
- Meizu M5
  - Meizu M5c (A5)
  - Meizu M5s
  - Meizu M5 Note
- Meizu M6
  - Meizu M6s
  - Meizu M6T
  - Meizu M6 Note
  - Meizu M8c
- Meizu M10 (mblu 10)
  - Meizu M10s (mblu 10s)
- Meizu M20 (mblu 20)
- Meizu M21 (mblu 21)
- Meizu mblu Pad 2

==== V series ====
- Meizu V8 (M8 lite)
- Meizu V8 Pro (M8)

==== Note series ====
- Meizu Note 8
- Meizu Note 9
- Meizu Note 21
  - Meizu Note 21 Pro

==== Number series ====
The Meizu number series is a range of high-end Meizu smartphones and is the successor of the PRO series.

===== Meizu 15 series =====
The Meizu 15 series was released in order to celebrate Meizu's 15th nniversary.

- Meizu 15 Lite (M15)
- Meizu 15
- Meizu 15 Plus

===== Meizu 16 series =====
- Meizu 16 (16th)
- Meizu 16 Plus
- Meizu 16X
- Meizu 16s
- Meizu 16Xs
- Meizu 16s Pro
- Meizu 16T

===== Meizu 17 series =====
- Meizu 17
- Meizu 17 Pro

===== Meizu 18 series =====
- Meizu 18
- Meizu 18 Pro
- Meizu 18x
- Meizu 18s
- Meizu 18s Pro

===== Meizu 20 series =====
Meizu skipped the Meizu 19 series in order to launch the Meizu 20 series, so as to celebrate the 20th anniversary of Meizu.

- Meizu 20
- Meizu 20 Classic
- Meizu 20 Pro
- Meizu 20 Infinity

===== Meizu 21 series =====
- Meizu 21
- Meizu 21 Pro
- Meizu 21 Note

=== Other ===
- Meizu X
- Meizu X8
- Meizu C9
- Meizu C9 Pro
- Meizu Zero
- Meizu Lucky 08
- Meizu 22

=== AR Glasses ===
- MYVU AR
- MYVU Discovery AR

=== Smart Ring ===
- MYVU Smart Ring

=== Meizu Watch ===
- Meizu Watch

=== Electric Vehicles ===
- DreamCar MX

=== MP3 players ===
MP3 players devices:

- Meizu E2
- Meizu E5
- Meizu E3
- Meizu E3C
- Meizu ME V6
- Meizu ME V6S
- Meizu ME V7
- Meizu MI V6
- Meizu MI V6S
- Meizu MI V7
- Meizu M3 (MP3 player)
- Meizu M6 TS
- Meizu M6 TP
- Meizu M6 SP
- Meizu M6 SL
- Meizu X2
- Meizu X3
- Meizu X6
