= Jack Wong =

Chinese entrepreneur

Jack Wong, or Huang Zhang (Chinese: 黄章; pinyin: Huáng Zhāng), is a Chinese billionaire entrepreneur. He is the founder and chairman of Meizu, a Chinese consumer electronics company.

== Early life ==
Jack Wong was born on February 13, 1976, in Meixian, Meizhou, Guangdong.

At the age of 16, Wong was expelled from high school and therefore did not attend college. At a young age he was enthusiastic about electronic devices.

Before getting involved in the consumer electronics industry, Wong worked as pier porter. Later, he moved to Shenzhen to get into the electronics industry.

In 2002, he became general manager of a Singaporean joint venture company called "Aegean". He shaped the strategy of the company and shifted its focus on production of speakers and MP3 players. The company was able to offer innovative products at that time, such as MP3 players with a battery life of 20 hours and 128 MB of internal storage. After divergences with the shareholders due to different opinions on brand management and marketing, Wong decided to leave the company.

== History with Meizu ==
At the end of 2002, Wong invested 100,000 RMB to start a new company called Meizu. The first Meizu MP3 player was released in the second quarter of 2003.

In June 2003, the Meizu internet forum was launched to serve as a platform for interaction with customers. Wong himself was very active on the forum and endorses all employees to emphasize customer feedback for further development of products. Between 2003 and 2009, Wong himself had almost 6000 posts on the Meizu forum.

In 2010, Wong decided to retreat from the management of Meizu, however on February 10, 2014, Meizu announced that Jack Wong would be appointed as the CEO of the company, but eventually this did not happen.

== Personal life ==
Little is known about Wong's personal life, as he prefers to keep his privacy. Aber Bai, the co-founder and current CEO of Meizu, stated that Jack Wong never gave an interview.

According to Forbes, Wong was the 186th richest person in China with a net worth of US$2.6 billion as of 2017. It is also known that Jack Wong is currently married. He has 4 children, whose names are Tommy, Suzy, Mayson, and Alam. All of them go to Zhuhai International School.
