= Meizu M3 Note =

Smartphone from Meizu

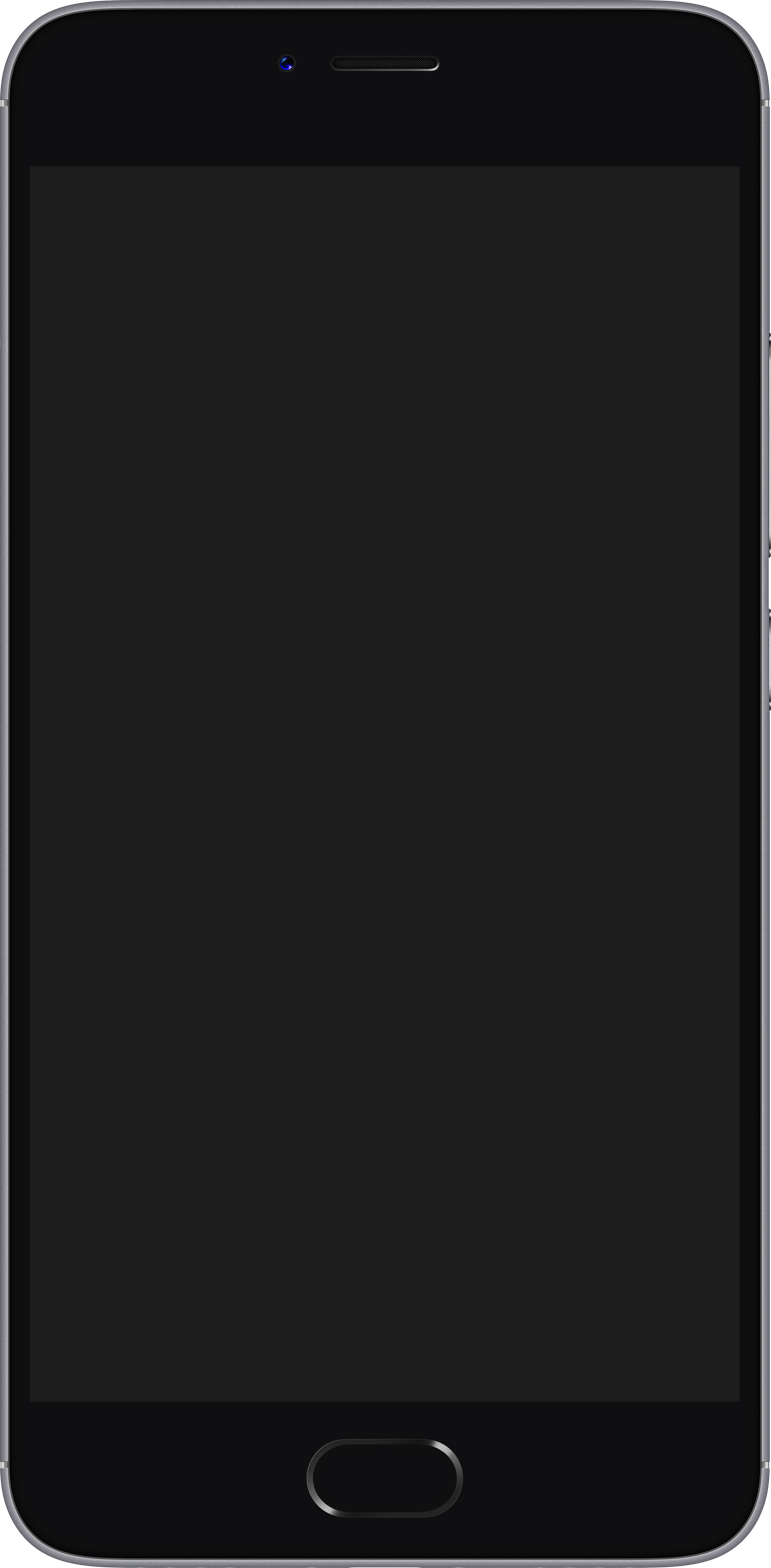
- Manufacturer: Meizu
- Type: Touchscreen smartphone
- Series: Meizu M Series
- First released: April 6, 2016; 10 years ago
- Predecessor: Meizu M2 Note
- Compatible networks: GSM, UMTS, HSPA, LTE
- Dimensions: 153.6 mm (6.05 in) H 75.5 mm (2.97 in) W 8.2 mm (0.32 in) D
- Weight: 163 g (5.7 oz)
- Operating system: Flyme OS 5.1.3.0G, based on Android 5.1 Lollipop, upgradeable to Flyme OS 6
- System-on-chip: MediaTek MT6755 Helio P10
- CPU: Octa-core (4x1.8GHz Cortex-A53, 4x1.0GHz Cortex-A53)
- GPU: ARM Mali-T860
- Memory: 2 GB or 3 GB LPDDR3
- Storage: 16 GB or 32 GB flash memory
- Removable storage: microSD slot (up to 256 GB)
- SIM: Dual SIM
- Battery: 4100 mAh Li-Ion rechargeable battery, not replaceable
- Rear camera: 13.0 MP, PDAF autofocus, ƒ/2.2 aperture, LED flash, 1080p30 recording
- Front camera: 5.0 MP, ƒ/2.0 aperture
- Display: 5.5 inch diagonal LTPS; 1080x1920 px (403 ppi) with MiraVision 2.0 technology
- Connectivity: 3.5 mm TRS connector, Bluetooth 4.0 with BLE, Dual-band WiFi (802.11 a/b/g/n)
- Data inputs: Multi-touch capacitive touchscreen, GPS, A-GPS, GLONASS, Accelerometer, Gyroscope, IR proximity sensor, Digital compass, Ambient light sensor, Gravity sensor, mTouch 2.1 fingerprint sensor
- Other: Dual SIM support with dual standby mode

The Meizu M3 Note is a smartphone designed and produced by the Chinese manufacturer Meizu, which runs on Flyme OS, Meizu's modified Android operating system. It is the successor of the Meizu M2 Note. It was unveiled on April 6, 2016, in Beijing.

== History ==
Initial rumors appeared in March 2016 after a possible specification sheet had been leaked, stating that the upcoming device would most likely feature a MediaTek Helio P10 System on a chip, a Full HD display and a 4100 mAh battery.

On March 22, Meizu founder Jack Wong mentioned that the M3 Note was about to launch soon.

The following day, Meizu confirmed that the launch event for the Meizu M3 Note will take place in Beijing on April 6, 2016.

The new device was later sighted on the AnTuTu benchmark, confirming the speculations that it will be powered by a MediaTek Helio P10 SoC.

On April 4, 2016, Meizu released a teaser for the product launch, confirming that the coming device would feature an all-metal body.

=== Release ===
As announced, the M3 Note was released in Beijing on April 6, 2016.

Pre-orders for the M3 Note began after the launch event on April 6, 2016. Sales began on April 30, 2016, in mainland China and on May 11, 2016, in India.

== Features ==
=== Flyme ===
The Meizu M3 Note was released with Flyme OS 5.1.3.0G, a modified operating system based on Android 5.1 Lollipop. It features an alternative, flat design and improved one-handed usability. It can be updated to Flyme OS 6 based on Android 5.1 Lollipop.

=== Hardware and design ===
The Meizu M3 Note features a MediaTek Helio P10 system-on-a-chip with an array of eight ARM Cortex-A53 CPU cores, an ARM Mali-T860 GPU and 2 GB or 3 GB of RAM. The M3 Note reaches a score of 50,000 points on the AnTuTu benchmark and is therefore approximately 56% faster than its predecessor, the Meizu M2 Note.

The M3 Note is available in three different colors (grey, silver and champagne gold) and comes with either 2 GB of RAM and 16 GB of internal storage or 3 GB of RAM and 32 GB of internal storage.

Unlike its predecessor, the Meizu M3 Note has a full-metal body, which measures 153.6 mm (6.05 in) x 75.5 mm (2.97 in) x 8.2 mm (0.32 in) and weighs 163 g (5.7 oz). It has a slate form factor, being rectangular with rounded corners and has only one central physical button at the front. Unlike most other Android smartphones, the M3 Note doesn't have capacitive buttons nor on-screen buttons. The functionality of these keys is implemented using a technology called mBack, which makes use of gestures with the physical button. The M3 Note further extends this button by a fingerprint sensor called mTouch which is updated to mTouch 2.1.

The M3 Note features a fully laminated 5.5-inch LTPS multi-touch capacitive touchscreen display with a FHD resolution of 1080 by 1920 pixels. The pixel density of the display is 403 ppi.

In addition to the touchscreen input and the front key, the device has volume/zoom control buttons and the power/lock button on the right side, a 3.5mm TRS audio jack on the top and a microUSB (Micro-B type) port on the bottom for charging and connectivity.

The Meizu M3 Note has two cameras. The rear camera has a resolution of 13 MP, a ƒ/2.2 aperture, a 5-element lens, phase-detection autofocus and an LED flash. The front camera has a resolution of 5 MP, a ƒ/2.0 aperture and a 5-element lens.

=== Camera ===
The Meizu M3 Note has a 13 MP main camera featuring an f/2.2 aperture and Phase Detection Autofocus (PDAF). This camera can record video in 1080p resolution at 30 frames per second. The device has a 5 MP front-facing camera with an f/2.0 aperture, which also supports 1080p video recording at 30 fps.

== Reception ==
The M3 Note received generally positive reviews.

Android Authority gave the M3 Note a rating of 8.2 out of 10 possible points and concluded that "the Meizu M3 Note packs a very large punch for its price". Furthermore, the build quality, battery life and the good display were praised.

Huffington Post stated that the Meizu M3 Note is "[an] affordable and highly functional Android smartphone, with a large HD screen, great design and impressive battery life".

Android Headlines also reviewed the device and concluded that "[the] overall fantastic performance and just a great experience in general make the Meizu M3 Note an easy recommendation for sure".

TechSpot gave the M3 Note a rating of 7.5 out of 10 possible points and noted that "the M3 Note could be a great budget smartphone purchase".

== See also ==
- Meizu
- Meizu M2 Note
