= Indium gallium zinc oxide =

Semiconducting material

Indium gallium zinc oxide (IGZO) is a semiconducting material, consisting of indium (In), gallium (Ga), zinc (Zn) and oxygen (O), with a unique atomic arrangement that ensures stable performance. IGZO can describe a range of compositions within the complex (In_{2}O_{3})_{x}(Ga_{2}O_{3})_{y}(ZnO)_{1-x-y} ternary system. Industry standard IGZO compositions in terms of In:Ga:Zn cation ratios include 1:1:1 and 2:2:1. This unique structure enhances picture resolution and supports compatibility with diverse display technologies, contributing to higher efficiency, performance, and reliability. In its amorphous form, a-IGZO is a representative transparent amorphous oxide semiconductor (TAOS), a class of wide-band-gap oxide semiconductors that combine optical transparency with electron transport suitable for thin-film transistors.

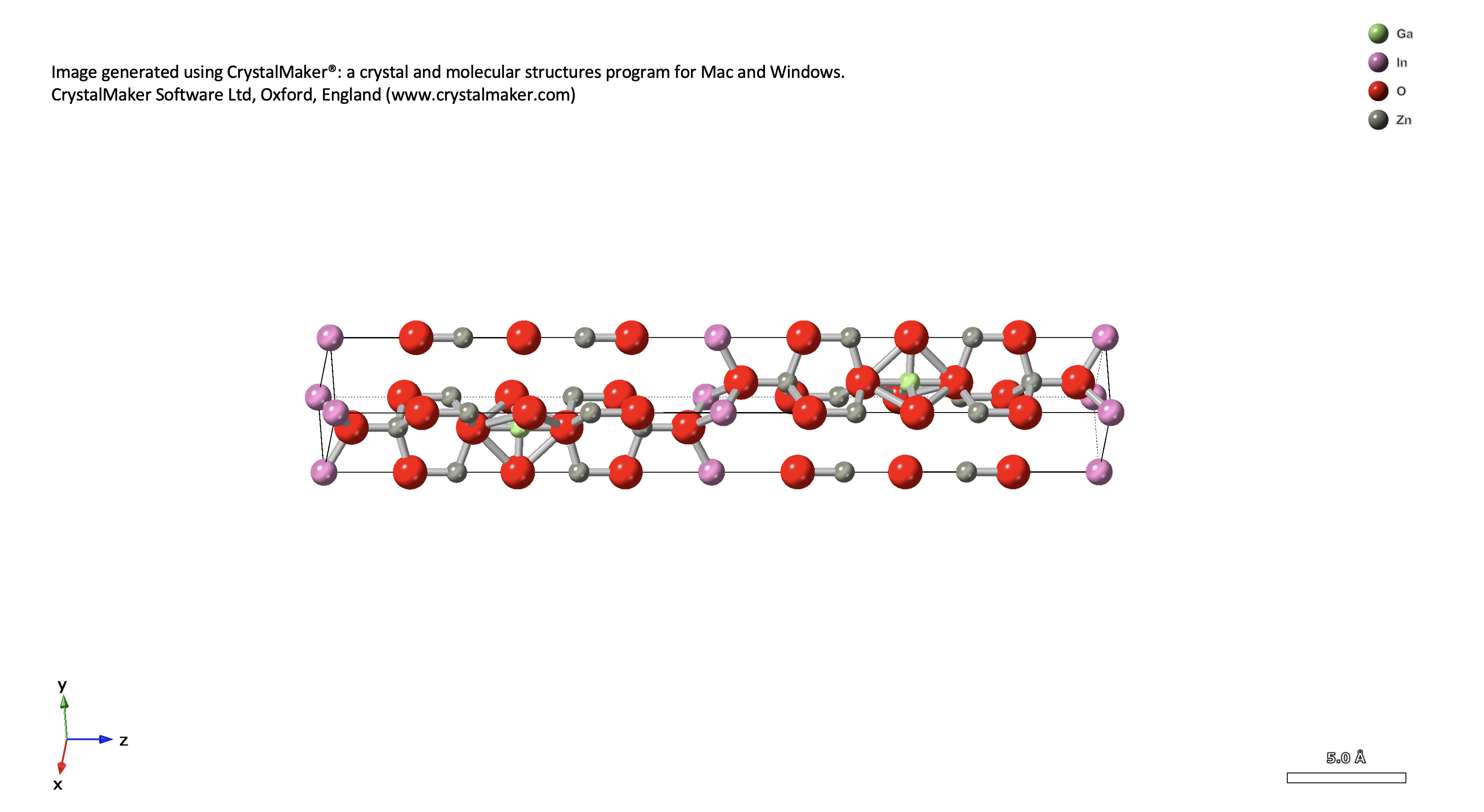
A ball and stick schematic of the hexagonal crystal structure of c-IGZO

The structure of crystalline IGZO (c-IGZO) can be characterized by a set of homologous structures described by the formula InGaO_{3}(ZnO)_{m}. For cases where m is an integer, the parity of m determines the crystal system and structure. When m is even the structure has a hexagonal symmetry (P6_{3}/mmc) and when m is odd the structure has a trigonal symmetry (R-3m). IGZO can also exist in an amorphous form (a-IGZO).

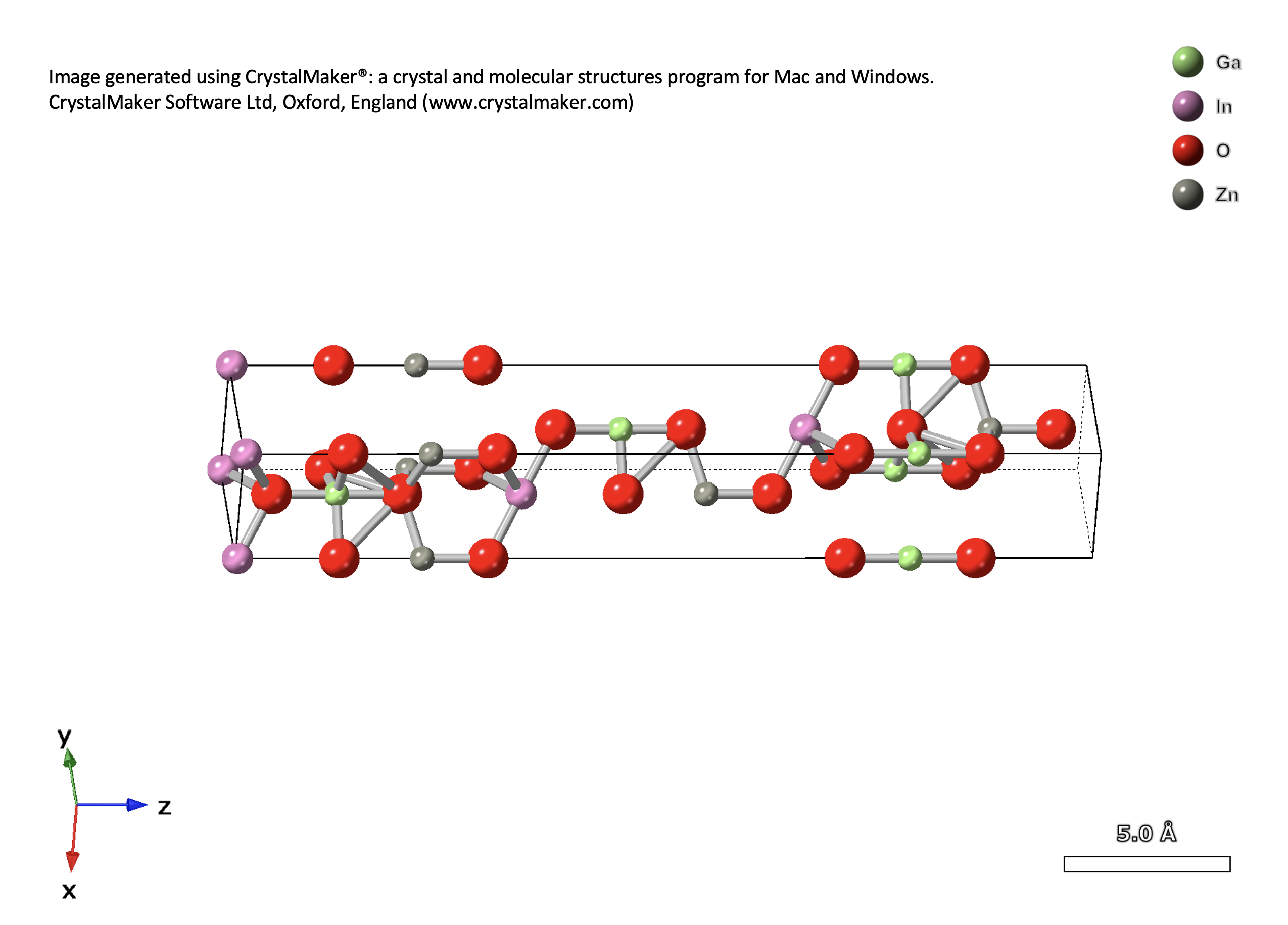
A ball and stick schematic of the trigonal crystal structure of c-IGZO

IGZO has a very low leakage current and an exceptionally high electron mobility, which is 20-50 times greater than that of amorphous silicon commonly used in liquid-crystal displays (LCDs) and e-papers. The high electron mobility facilitates the miniaturization of transistors and thinning of circuits, allowing for greater light transmission per pixel, effectively doubling the resolution without losing the brightness. This further results in fast response time or less processing delay. Additionally, IGZO is known for its low power consumption. Unlike conventional screens that require all pixels to be driven continuously, IGZO retains image information without refreshing. This reduces its power consumption to as little as one-fifth or even one-tenth that of traditional displays. This further leads to an extension in battery life of portable devices.

IGZO is widely used in thin-film transistors (TFT) for display applications, such as in the TFT backplane of flat-panel displays (FPDs). IGZO-TFT was developed by Hideo Hosono's group at Tokyo Institute of Technology and Japan Science and Technology Agency (JST) in 2003 (crystalline IGZO-TFT) and in 2004 (amorphous IGZO-TFT). Since IGZO-TFT has 20–50 times the electron mobility of amorphous silicon, IGZO-TFT can improve the speed, resolution and size of flat-panel displays. It is currently used as the thin-film transistors for use in organic light-emitting diode (OLED) TV displays. While polycrystalline silicon can also exhibit high electron mobilities, its performance is often inconsistent due to the grain boundaries and affect device reliability. In contrast, amorphous IGZO (a-IGZO) TFTs offers a more cost-effective and practical alternative, as it can be fabricated over large areas at low temperatures, ensuring greater uniformity and quality.

IGZO-TFT and its applications are patented by JST. They have been licensed to Samsung Electronics (in 2011) and Sharp (in 2012).

In 2012, Sharp was the first to start production of LCD panels incorporating IGZO-TFT. Sharp uses IGZO-TFT for smartphones, tablets, and 32" LCDs. In these, the aperture ratio of the LCD is improved by up to 20%. Power consumption is improved by LCD idling stop technology, which is possible due to the high mobility and low off current of IGZO-TFT. Sharp has started to release high pixel-density panels for notebook applications. IGZO-TFT is also employed in the 14" 3,200x1,800 LCD of an ultrabook PC supplied by Fujitsu, also used in the Razer Blade 14" (Touchscreen Variant) Gaming Laptop and a 55" OLED TV supplied by LG Electronics.

IGZO's advantage over zinc oxide is that it can be deposited as a uniform amorphous phase while retaining the high carrier mobility common to oxide semiconductors. Reviews of amorphous In-Ga-Zn-O thin-film transistors describe this combination of amorphous uniformity and carrier mobility as a central reason for their display applications. The transistors are slightly photo-sensitive, but the effect becomes significant only in the deep violet to ultra-violet (photon energy above 3 eV) range, offering the possibility of a fully transparent transistor.

== Fabrication process ==
The current impediment to large-scale IGZO manufacturing is the synthesis method. The most widely used technique for transparent conducting oxide (TCO) synthesis is pulsed laser deposition (PLD). In PLD, a laser is used to focus on nano-sized spots on solid elemental targets. Laser pulse frequencies are varied between the targets in ratios to control the composition of the film. IGZO can be deposited onto substrates such as quartz, single-crystal silicon, or even plastic due to its ability for low-temperature deposition. The substrates are placed in a PLD vacuum chamber, which controls oxygen pressure in order to ensure favorable electrical properties. After synthesis, the film is annealed, or gradually exposed to air to adjust to the atmosphere.

While PLD is a useful and versatile synthesis technique, it requires expensive equipment and plenty of time for each sample to adjust to regular atmospheric conditions. This is not ideal for industrial manufacturing.

An alternative method to fabricate IGZO thin films with higher precision and scalability is the plasma-enhanced atomic layer deposition (PEALD) process. ALD is a precisely controlled chemical vapor deposition technique that deposits thin films layer by layer using gas precursors. In PEALD, the addition of a remote plasma source allows the precursor molecules to break down in the plasma, reducing reliance on thermal energy from the heated substrate and allowing for greater process flexibility.

Solution processing is a more cost effective alternative. Specifically, combustion synthesis techniques can be used. Kim et al. used a metal nitrate solution with an oxidizer to create an exothermic reaction. One common type of combustion synthesis is spin coating, which involves depositing In and Ga solution layers onto a hot plate and annealing at temperatures roughly between 200 and 400 degrees C, depending on the target composition. The films can be annealed in air, which is a large advantage over PLD.
