= Meizu M3 Max =

Smartphone

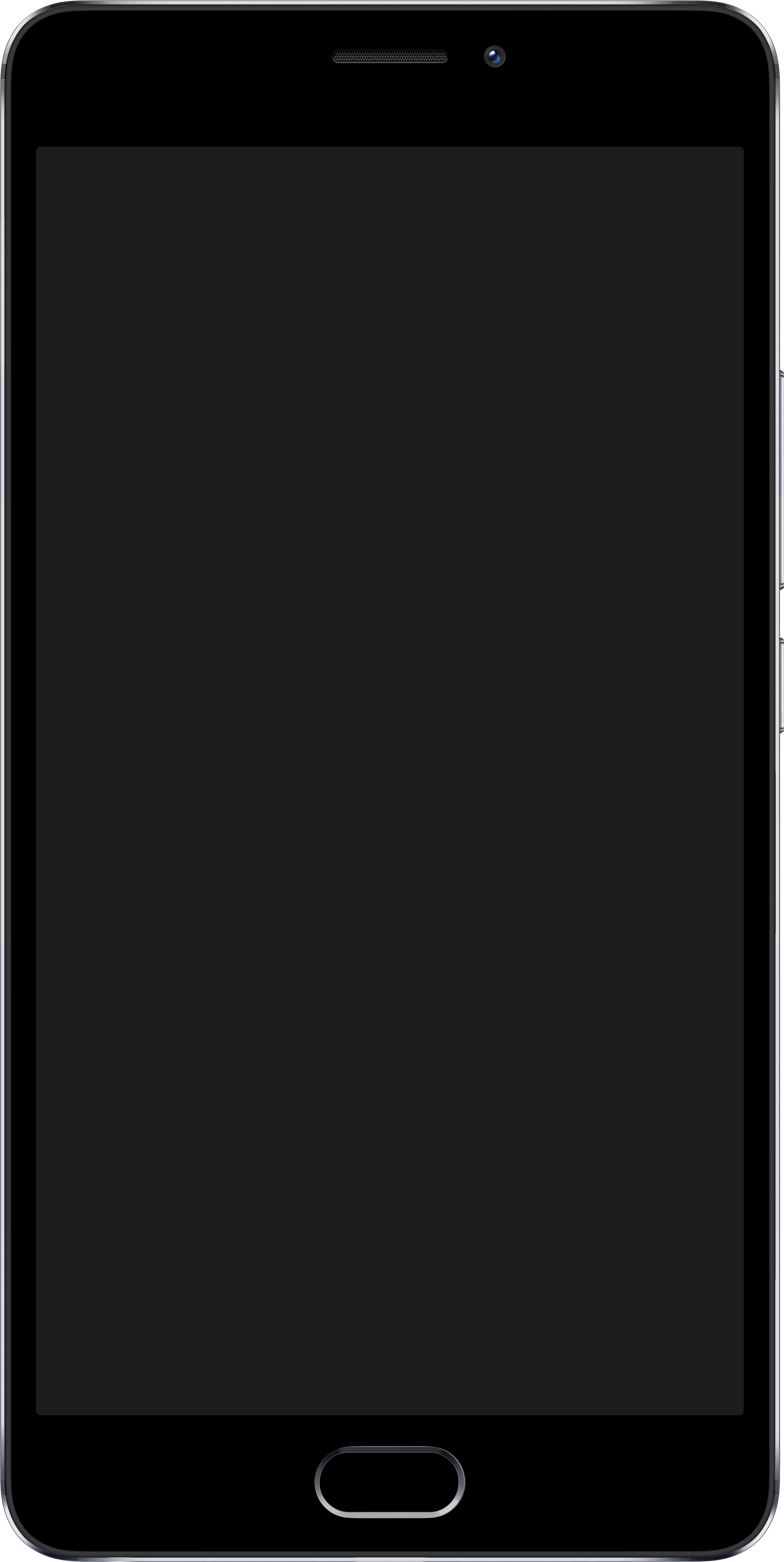
- Manufacturer: Meizu
- Type: Touchscreen smartphone
- Series: Meizu M Series
- First released: September 5, 2016; 9 years ago
- Compatible networks: GSM, UMTS, HSPA, LTE
- Dimensions: 163.4 mm (6.43 in) H 81.6 mm (3.21 in) W 7.9 mm (0.31 in) D
- Weight: 189 g (6.7 oz)
- Operating system: Flyme OS, based on Android 6.0 Marshmallow
- System-on-chip: MediaTek Helio P10
- CPU: Octa-core (4x1.5GHz Cortex-A53, 4x1.0GHz Cortex-A53)
- GPU: ARM Mali-T860 MP2
- Memory: 3 GB LPDDR3
- Storage: 64 GB flash memory
- Removable storage: microSD slot (up to 128 GB)
- Battery: 4100 mAh Li-Ion rechargeable battery, not replaceable
- Rear camera: 13.0 MP, PDAF autofocus, ƒ/2.2 aperture, LED flash, 1080p30 recording
- Front camera: 5.0 MP, ƒ/2.0 aperture
- Display: 6-inch diagonal IPS; 1080x1920 px (296 ppi)
- Connectivity: 3.5 mm TRS connector, Bluetooth 4.1 with BLE, Dual-band WiFi (802.11 a/b/g/n/ac)
- Data inputs: Multi-touch capacitive touchscreen, A-GPS, GLONASS, Accelerometer, Gyroscope, Proximity sensor, Digital compass, Ambient light sensor
- Other: Dual SIM support with dual standby mode

The Meizu M3 Max is a smartphone designed and produced by the Chinese manufacturer Meizu, which runs on Flyme OS, Meizu's modified Android operating system. It is a current phablet model of the M series. It was unveiled on September 5, 2016, in Beijing.

== History ==
In August, rumors about a new phablet Meizu device appeared after the company released some teasers for a new device mentioning that it will be a device containing "Max" in the product name. At the same point, invitations containing a Nokia device for a Meizu launch event on September 5, 2016, had been sent out.

On August 26, 2016, several leaked photos of the upcoming phablet device had been released.

=== Release ===
As announced, the M3 Max was released in Beijing on August 10, 2016.

Pre-orders for the M3 Max began after the launch event on August 10, 2016.

== Features ==
=== Flyme ===
The Meizu M3 Max was released with an updated version of Flyme OS, a modified operating system based on Android Marshmallow. It features an alternative, flat design and improved one-handed usability.

=== Hardware and design ===
The Meizu M3 Max features a MediaTek Helio P10 system-on-a-chip with an array of eight ARM Cortex-A53 CPU cores, an ARM Mali-T860 MP2 GPU and 3 GB of RAM.

The M3 Max is available in four different colors (grey, silver, champagne gold and rose gold) and comes with 3 GB of RAM and 32 GB of internal storage.

The Meizu M3 Max has a full-metal body, which measures 163.4 mm (6.43 in) x 81.6 mm (3.21 in) x 7.9 mm (0.31 in) and weighs 189 g (6.7 oz). It has a slate form factor, being rectangular with rounded corners and has only one central physical button at the front. Unlike most other Android smartphones, the M3 Max doesn't have capacitive buttons nor on-screen buttons. The functionality of these keys is implemented using a technology called mBack, which makes use of gestures with the physical button. The M3 Max further extends this button by a fingerprint sensor called mTouch.

The M3 Max features a fully laminated 6-inch IPS multi-touch capacitive touchscreen display with an FHD resolution of 1080 by 1920 pixels. The pixel density of the display is 296 ppi.

In addition to the touchscreen input and the front key, the device has volume/zoom control buttons and the power/lock button on the right side, a 3.5 mm TRS audio jack on the top and a microUSB (Micro-B type) port on the bottom for charging and connectivity.

The Meizu M3 Max has two cameras. The rear camera has a resolution of 13 MP, an ƒ/2.2 aperture, a 5-element lens, phase-detection autofocus, and an LED flash. The front camera has a resolution of 5 MP, an ƒ/2.0 aperture, and a 4-element lens.

=== Camera ===
The Meizu M3 Max features a 13 MP main camera with an f/2.2 aperture and phase detection autofocus (PDAF) and a dual-LED dual-tone flash. It is capable of recording video at 1080p resolution at 30 frames per second. The device is equipped with a 5 MP front-facing camera with an f/2.0 aperture.
