= Meizu M6T =

2018 4G LTE smartphone

Meizu M6T (Mblu 6T in China)
- Brand: Meizu/Mblu
- Manufacturer: Meizu
- Type: Smartphone
- Series: M series
- First released: May 29, 2018; 8 years ago
- Related: Meizu M6; Meizu M6s; Meizu M6 Note
- Compatible networks: GSM, 3G, 4G LTE
- Form factor: Slate
- Colors: Black, Champagne Gold, Coral Red, Blue
- Dimensions: 152.3×73×8.4 mm (6.00×2.87×0.33 in)
- Weight: 143 g (5 oz)
- Operating system: Android 7.0 Nougat with Flyme 6.3
- System-on-chip: MediaTek MT6750
- CPU: Octa-core (4×1.5 GHz Cortex-A53 & 4×1.0 GHz Cortex-A53)
- GPU: Mali-T860MP2
- Memory: 3/4 GB LPDDR3
- Storage: 32/64 GB eMMC 5.1
- Removable storage: microSDXC up to 128 GB
- SIM: 2× nanoSIM
- Battery: Non-removable Li-Ion 3300 mAh
- Charging: 10 W
- Rear camera: 13 MP OmniVision OV13855, f/2.2, 28mm (wide), 1/3.06", 1.12µm, PDAF + 2 MP Superpix SP2509, f/2.8 (depth); LED flash, panorama Video: 1080p@30fps
- Front camera: 8 MP Samsung S5K4H7, f/2.0 (wide), 1/4", 1.12µm Video: 1080p@30fps
- Display: 5.7-inch IPS LCD, 1440 × 720 pixels (HD+), 18:9 ratio, 282 ppi
- Sound: Mono
- Connectivity: microUSB 2.0, 3.5 mm jack, Bluetooth 4.1 (A2DP, LE), FM radio, Wi-Fi 802.11 a/b/g/n (dual-band, Wi-Fi Direct), GPS (A-GPS), GLONASS
- Data inputs: Touchscreen (Multi-touch), microphone, fingerprint sensor (rear-mounted), accelerometer, proximity, compass
- Codename: m1811

The Meizu M6T (Mblu 6T in China) is a smartphone developed by Meizu as part of the "M" series. It was unveiled on May 29, 2018 and December 5, 2018 in India.

== Specifications ==
=== Design & appearance ===
The front panel is made of glass, while the body is constructed from plastic.

The bottom houses a microUSB port along with the speaker and microphone grilles. The top features a 3.5 mm audio jack. On the left side is a hybrid tray with one slot for a SIM card and a second slot for either a SIM card or a microSD card up to 128 GB. The volume rocker and power button are located on the right. The fingerprint scanner is positioned on the back panel.

It features a 5.7-inch IPS LCD display with a resolution of 1440 × 720 (HD+), an 18:9 aspect ratio, and a pixel density of 282 ppi.

The Meizu M6T was sold in four colors: Black, Champagne Gold, Blue, and Red.

=== Hardware ===
The Meizu M6T is powered by a MediaTek MT6750 system-on-a-chip. The smartphone was available in 3/32 GB, 4/32 GB, and 4/64 GB configurations.

The device is equipped with a 3300 mAh battery.

The smartphone features a dual rear camera setup with a 13 MP wide-angle lens with an aperture of f/2.2 and phase-detection autofocus (PDAF) and a 2 MP depth sensor with an aperture of f/2.8. It also has an 8 MP front-facing camera with an f/2.0 aperture.

Both the rear and front cameras are capable of recording video at 1080p@30fps.

=== Software ===
The smartphone runs on Flyme 6.3 based on Android 7.0 Nougat.
