= 1:1 pixel mapping =

Video display technique

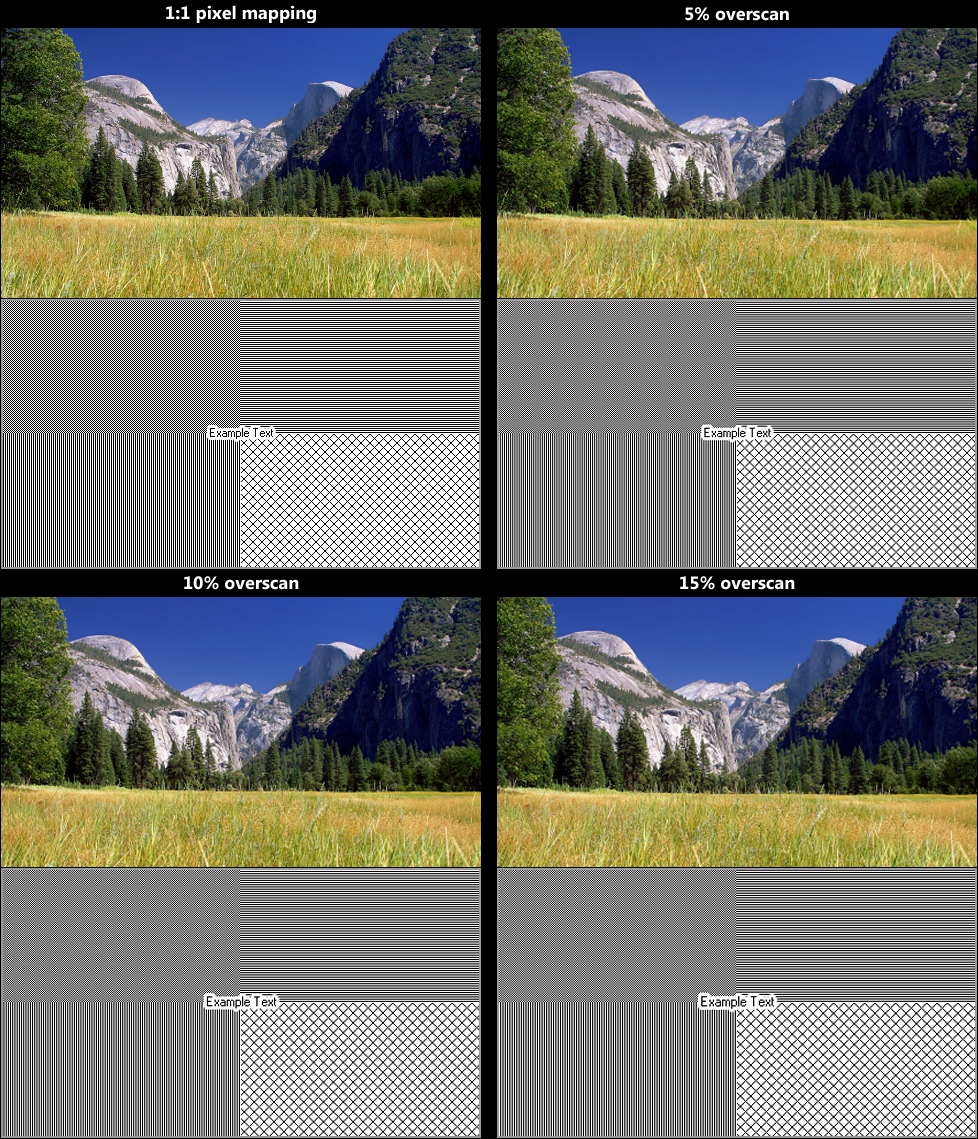
The effects of overscan on fixed-pixel displays (View image at full size in order to see the effects.)

An example of a 1x1 image.

1:1 pixel mapping is a video display technique applicable to devices with native fixed pixels, such as LCD monitors and plasma displays. A monitor that has been set to 1:1 pixel mapping will display an input source without scaling it, such that each pixel received is mapped to a single native pixel on the monitor. This technique avoids loss of sharpness due to scaling artifacts and normally (Note: Except the uncommon case where display and input differ in pixel aspect ratio such as when one doesn't use square pixels) avoids incorrect aspect ratio due to stretching. If the input resolution is less than the monitor's native resolution, this will result in black borders around the image (e.g. letterboxing or windowboxing).

== See also ==
- Overscan
- HD ready 1080p
