= Meizu X8 =

- Brand: Meizu
- Manufacturer: Meizu
- Type: Smartphone
- First released: September 19, 2018; 7 years ago
- Related: Meizu Note 8 Meizu 16X
- Compatible networks: GSM, 3G 4G (LTE)
- Form factor: Monoblock
- Colors: Black, Blue, White
- Dimensions: 151.2×74.6×7.8 mm (5.95×2.94×0.31 in)
- Weight: 160 g (6 oz)
- Operating system: Initial: Android 8.1 Oreo + Flyme 7.1.7.0G; Current: Android 9 Pie + Flyme 8.1
- System-on-chip: Qualcomm SDM710 Snapdragon 710 (10 nm)
- CPU: Octa-core (2×2.2 GHz 360 Gold & 6×1.7 GHz Kryo 360 Silver)
- GPU: Adreno 616
- Memory: 4 GB, LPDDR4X (64 GB version), 6 GB LPDDRX (128 GB version)
- Storage: 64/128 GB UFS 2.0
- SIM: Dual SIM (Nano-SIM, dual stand-by)
- Battery: Non-removable Li-Ion 3210 mAh battery
- Charging: mCharge 4 24W fast charging
- Rear camera: 12 MP Samsung S5K2L7/Sony IMX362, f/1.9 (wide-angle lens), 1/2.55", 1.4 μm, Dual Pixel PDAF + 5 MP, f/2.4 (depth sensor); 2-LED dual-tone flash, HDR, panorama Video: 1080p@30fps
- Front camera: 20 MP Sony IMX376, f/2.0 (wide-angle lens), 1/2.8", 1.0 μm, PDAF; 1080p@30fps
- Display: IPS LCD, 6.15", 2220 × 1080, 18.5:9, 401 ppi
- Connectivity: WLAN: Wi-Fi 802.11 b/g/n/ac, dual-band, Wi-Fi Direct, hotspot Bluetooth: 5.0, A2DP, LE

The Meizu X8 is a mid-range smartphone developed and manufactured by Meizu. It was released on September 19, 2018, alongside the Meizu 16X, Meizu V8, and V8 Pro.

== Design ==
The back panel and screen are made of glass. The sides of the smartphone are made of aluminum.

At the bottom, there is a USB-C connector, a speaker, and a microphone stylized as a speaker. At the top, there is a 3.5mm audio jack. On the left side of the smartphone, there is a slot for two SIM cards. On the right side, there are volume control buttons and a power button. The fingerprint scanner is located on the back panel.

The Meizu X8 was available in 3 colors: Black, Blue, and White.

== Technical specifications ==
=== Processor ===
The smartphone is powered by a Qualcomm Snapdragon 710 processor and an Adreno 616 graphics processor.

=== Battery ===
The battery has a capacity of 3210 mAh and supports 24W fast charging using mCharge 4 technology.

=== Camera ===
The smartphone features a dual rear camera system consisting of a 12MP, f/1.9 wide-angle lens and a 5MP depth sensor with Dual Pixel phase detection autofocus. It can record video in 1080p at 30fps. The front-facing camera has a 20MP wide-angle lens with an aperture of f/2.0 and can record video in 1080p at 30fps.

=== Display ===
The phone's display has an IPS LCD screen, sizing about 6.15 inches, a 2220 x 1080 resolution (Full HD+) with an aspect ratio of 18.5:9 with a pixel density of 401 ppi, and a notch for the proximity sensor, speaker, and front camera.

=== Storage ===
The smartphone was sold in configurations of 4/64 and 6/128 GB.

=== Software ===
The smartphone was initially released with Flyme 7.1.7.0G, which was based on Android 8.1 Oreo. It was later updated to Flyme 8.1, built on Android 9 Pie. There were plans to upgrade the smartphone to Android 10, but due to a significant number of bugs, the update was canceled.
