= NFL on television in the 2010s =

Overview of NFL TV in the 2010s

Until the broadcast contract ended in 2013, the terrestrial television networks CBS, NBC, and Fox, as well as cable television's ESPN, paid a combined total of US$20.4 billion to broadcast NFL games. From 2014 to 2022, the same networks will pay $39.6 billion for exactly the same broadcast rights. The NFL thus holds broadcast contracts with four companies (Paramount Global, Comcast, Fox Corporation and The Walt Disney Company/Hearst Corporation, respectively) that control a combined vast majority of the country's television product. League-owned NFL Network, on cable television, also broadcasts a selected number of games nationally. In 2017, the NFL games attracted the top three rates for a 30-second advertisement: $699,602 for NBC Sunday Night Football, $550,709 for Thursday Night Football (NBC), and $549,791 for Thursday Night Football (CBS).

Under the current contracts, regionally shown games on Sunday afternoons are televised on CBS and Fox, which primarily carry games of AFC and NFC teams respectively (the conference of the away team determines the broadcaster of an inter-conference game). Nationally televised regular season games on Sunday and Monday nights are aired on NBC and ESPN, respectively, while NBC, FOX and NFL Network share Thursday night games during the regular season. During the postseason, ESPN airs one game, NBC airs two, while CBS and Fox air the rest of the AFC and NFC games, respectively. The Super Bowl has rotated annually among CBS, Fox, and NBC since the 2006 season.

NFL preseason telecasts are more in line with the other major sports leagues' regular-season telecasts: preseason telecasts are more locally produced, usually by a local affiliate of one of the above terrestrial television networks. Some preseason games will air nationally, however. Under the NFL's anti-siphoning rules for cable games, these stations usually will air simulcasts of ESPN and/or NFL Network games in their local markets if the local team is playing.

== Year-by-year breakdown ==
=== 2010 ===
With an average U.S. audience of 106.5 million viewers, Super Bowl XLIV on CBS was, at the time, the most-watched Super Bowl telecast in the championship game's history as well as the most-watched program of any kind in American television history, beating the record previously set 27 years earlier by the final episode of M*A*S*H, which was watched by 105.97 million viewers. The game telecast drew an overnight national Nielsen rating of 46.4 with a 68 share, the highest for a Super Bowl since Super Bowl XX in 1986; and drew a 56.3 rating in New Orleans and a 54.2 rating in Indianapolis, first and fourth respectively among local markets. Super Bowl XLV surpassed the record a year later and was itself topped by Super Bowl XLVI in 2012.

The 2010 schedule, released on April 20, placed a Sunday night game (Pittsburgh Steelers at New Orleans Saints) against a World Series game for the first time since the NBC Sunday night contract began. It also continued the previous practice of scheduling a Sunday night game during every week of the season, and declaring the games in Weeks 11 through 16 (November 21 through December 26) as "flex games", meaning they reverted to Sunday afternoon if a more attractive matchup arose.

A new graphics package for Fox's NFL telecasts debuted during an August 19, 2010 pre-season game, as the network began to broadcast its sports programming with graphics optimized for 16:9 displays rather than the 4:3 safe area, resulting in the network asking cable and satellite providers to comply and use the #10 Active Format Description code to send out over Fox programming, which displays 16:9 content in a letterboxed format on 4:3 screens (largely on the analog affiliate feed carried by the provider), in concert with Fox News Channel and its related news productions for the Fox network also switching to full widescreen presentation. This was promoted during that first game by the Fox broadcast team as giving a "widescreen viewing experience" to standard definition viewers, using the usual examples of more video information on the screen to demonstrate the new presentation (such as two cheerleaders off to the side displayed in a widescreen shot, but cut out of a 4:3 shot).

The graphics package is an upgraded version of the 2006 design with a "much more colorful 3D look", implemented using a new infrastructure using products developed by Vizrt, which was also rolled out to other Fox Sports networks in subsequent months. The score banner previously used was replaced by an unconventional FoxBox-styled layout, positioned in the top left corner of the screen, with team logos and scores on either side, lights indicating timeouts on the side rims, with the play clock and quarter positioned in the center. Initially, the play clock also appeared within the center area with 10 seconds remaining, sliding the time remaining in the quarter upward. However, the play clock indicator was soon moved to the bar sliding out of the bottom to show downage.

Due to issues with some cable providers and Fox affiliates (particularly those carried by digital subchannels or low-power analog television stations) in implementing the AFD #10 widescreen mode, or for other broadcasters that still broadcast with content framed for 4:3 displays instead of defaulting to 16:9 like Fox (such as CBS and NBC, along with ESPN and NFL Network until they also switched to 16:9 with letterboxed SD feeds), feeds of Fox's NFL games have been offered with graphics positioned for 4:3 displays instead of 16:9, and in most cases, only one game per week was broadcast with 16:9 graphics.

On November 15, 2010, the Eagles visited the Redskins, in what was Donovan McNabb's second game against the Eagles since being traded on April 4 of that year. The Redskins won the first meeting that season by a score of 17–12; however, in the first half of the game, Eagles star quarterback Michael Vick suffered a rib injury knocking him out of the game, resulting in Kevin Kolb taking over. After the game, McNabb gave a post-game speech in the locker room in which he stated the Eagles made a mistake by trading him. Before the game, McNabb signed a five-year contract extension worth $78 million, after being benched in the fourth quarter just a week earlier. The very first play of the game Vick threw an 88-yard touchdown pass to DeSean Jackson.

The Redskins were criticized for their lack of coverage because the Eagles were known for going deep on the first play; the Eagles' next two possessions led to touchdowns. The very first play of the second quarter, with Philadelphia up 28–0, saw Vick throw a 48-yard touchdown to Jeremy Maclin. With Philadelphia up 45–21 at halftime, Vick threw a three-yard touchdown to Jason Avant in the third quarter to make the score 52–21. During the play, Vick scrambled, waiting for someone to get open when Albert Haynesworth (who signed a six-year $100 million contract with the Redskins the year prior) had fallen down and continued to lie on the field as Vick continued to scramble. The very next Redskins possession had McNabb throw a pick six to Dimitri Patterson, helping the Eagles score seven points.

The Redskins went on to score one more touchdown, however their seven-point run was not able to stop Philadelphia, which defeated Washington 59–28. McNabb finished the game with 295 yards on 17 for 31, along with two touchdowns and three interceptions. The Eagles finished with 593 offense yards (setting a new team record); Vick went 20 of 28 for 333 yards throwing four touchdowns, and also ran for 80 yards and two touchdowns on eight carries. He became the first player with at least 300 yards passing, 50 yards rushing four passing touchdowns and two rushing touchdowns in a game. Vick's performance in the game also moved him past Steve Young for second place on the all-time list for rushing yards by a quarterback.

On November 28, 2010, CBS broadcast its 5,000th NFL game. The game in question involved the Miami Dolphins visiting the Oakland Raiders, with Gus Johnson and Steve Tasker calling play-by-play.

Fox presented a limited Monday night game between the New York Giants and Minnesota Vikings on December 13, 2010. The game had been originally scheduled to be played on the afternoon on December 12, but due to the collapse of the roof of the Metrodome early that morning due to weight from heavy snowpack, the game was moved on short notice to Ford Field in Detroit, as that facility already had their full television setup still in place after a Packers–Lions game. Fox Sports had kept their cameras on in the Metrodome overnight before the originally scheduled game day and recorded the stadium roof collapse in full detail; their video, captured at multiple angles, aired on that day's edition of Fox NFL Sunday and quickly went viral.

The game was only made available on the main Fox stations in the New York and Twin Cities media markets; owned-and-operated station WNYW and affiliate WXXA-TV aired the game in the New York City and Albany television markets, while Minneapolis–St. Paul owned-and-operated station KMSP-TV, and affiliates KXLT-TV in Rochester and KQDS-TV in Duluth, Minnesota carried the game for the Vikings' markets. The game was also carried on satellite provider DirecTV through its NFL Sunday Ticket package.

In December 2010, Fox experimented with using an in-game soundtrack during a regional game between the Arizona Cardinals and Carolina Panthers. The following week on December 16, Fox publicly announced that it would also feature it during a game on December 20 between the San Francisco 49ers and Seattle Seahawks. Fox Sports president Eric Shanks revealed that CSI: Miami composer Jeff Cardoni had contributed music for the experiment, and saw potential in the concept, explaining that "just like music in movies, you have to use it at the right times. And imagine trying to score a movie the first time you're seeing it." The concept was met with mixed reaction; sports blogger Michael David Smith believed that the music was "goofy", distracting and added nothing to the game.

The Week 16 game, between the Minnesota Vikings and Philadelphia Eagles, originally scheduled for December 26, was moved to December 28 due to a major blizzard that affected most of the Eastern United States. The NFL postponed the game after Philadelphia Mayor Michael Nutter declared a snow emergency for the city. It was the 23rd NFL game to be played on a Tuesday, but the first since 1946. This was the only game, outside of the final Sunday night, to be "flexed" in the 2010 season; the original schedule called for the San Diego Chargers to play the Bengals in Cincinnati (the game was moved to CBS, and was indeed blacked out in Cincinnati). Because of this, a full 90-minute edition of Football Night aired on December 26, with a short five-minute pre-game leading into the game on the 28th, while Faith Hill's introduction was not played due to time constraints before kickoff.

For the Week 17 matchup, NBC featured the 7–8 St. Louis Rams playing the 6–9 Seattle Seahawks in a win-and-in game, where the winner of the game would qualify for the playoffs as the NFC West Division Champion while the loser would be eliminated. The Seahawks defeated the Rams 16-6, thus advancing to the playoffs.

=== 2011 ===
On January 23, 2011, Fox NFL Sunday also broadcast an on-location edition at Soldier Field in Chicago for the 2010 NFC Championship; the program held its Super Bowl XLV pregame show in Arlington, Texas on February 6, 2011.

The 2011 schedule, released on April 19, once again placed a Sunday night game (Indianapolis Colts at New Orleans Saints on October 23, the fourth straight time these teams played each other on national television) opposite a World Series game. Sunday night games between November 13 and December 18 (inclusive) were "flex games", which could have reverted to Sunday afternoon if a more competitive matchup arose (one was; see below). The final Sunday night of the season – January 1, 2012 – was likewise a "flex game"; the slot, vacant when the schedule was released, was filled by the game between the Dallas Cowboys and the New York Giants (see below). The Hall of Fame Game scheduled for August 7, and to be shown on NBC, was canceled due to the lockout that offseason; it was the only game to be affected.

For the second consecutive season, and third overall, the last Sunday night game that was flexed in featured a contest in which the winner would become the division champions and earn a home game in the playoffs while the loser would be eliminated. This particular matchup was for the NFC East between the New York Giants and the Dallas Cowboys at MetLife Stadium, a rematch of Week 14's Sunday night broadcast. This was the first time NBC had shown both meetings of division rivals during a regular season.

Starting with the 2011 NFL season, Fox NFL Sunday introduced a new feature called "Fox :45", which is usually formatted a sing-along parody of a famous song, or as a comedic sketch. The parodies and sketches usually relate to current events occurring during the football season. The program also introduced the "Twitter Tracker", which scrolls tweets from NFL players and coaches.

Small tweaks were also made by Fox for the 2011 season, including the timeout indicators counting upward instead of downward, and the possession indicator now appearing alongside the team that currently is in possession of the ball. Additionally, the scoreboard next to the Fox Sports bug for other ongoing NFL games was replaced by a traditional ticker first seen on Fox Major League Baseball broadcasts; the bug was made slightly smaller and rounder as well. Special holiday animations also appeared with the banner package; digitally animated leaves fell on top of the FoxBox on Thanksgiving, while falling snow piles on top during the last two weeks of December in observance of the Christmas and holiday season, with the timeout indicators being changed in the latter instance to resemble strings of Christmas lights.

ESPN renewed its contract with the NFL in 2011 which extends to ESPN the NFL broadcast rights through the 2021–22 season. ESPN increased the purchase price for the eighteen-game package, which will include in 2015 the Pro Bowl. Cable television operators condemned the contract, noting that ESPN has the highest retransmission consent fees of any national cable television channel, nearly five times higher than the nearest competitor (TNT), and raises fees on an annual basis. Nevertheless, the other networks had intended to follow suit by renewing their contracts through 2021–22, increasing their price to over $1 billion per year. The remaining networks announced they had indeed renewed with the NFL on December 14, 2011. Both the new ESPN and broadcast deals take effect in 2014-15 and will continue through Super Bowl LVI in 2022.

On October 3, 2011, Hank Williams Jr. made controversial remarks during an interview on Fox News Channel's Fox & Friends, when talking about a golf outing he went on that summer with Barack Obama, John Boehner, Joe Biden and John Kasich. Williams compared President Obama and Speaker of the House Boehner golfing together to "Hitler playing golf with [Israeli prime minister] Netanyahu", stressing their philosophical and political differences. On October 6, 2011, ESPN subsequently announced that it would stop using "All My Rowdy Friends" as its theme song (as the song is still owned by Williams) and drop Williams from the show's opening. Williams commented on the matter: "After reading hundreds of e-mails, I have made my decision... By pulling my opening October 3, [ESPN] stepped on the toes of the First Amendment Freedom of Speech, so therefore me, my song, and All My Rowdy Friends are out of here. It's been a great run." MNF was absent an opening sequence from Week 4 through the end of that season.

In 2017, ESPN re-hired Hank Williams Jr. for the intro.

The NFL announced on November 8 that the Week 13 rivalry game between the Indianapolis Colts and New England Patriots would be moved to 1:00 p.m. Eastern on CBS, while a replacement game would be announced by November 22. This was due to the Colts struggling without their star quarterback Peyton Manning (without him, the Colts lost 62–7 to the New Orleans Saints in a Sunday night game on October 23). This also marked the first time the NFL announced that a Sunday night game was being moved to the afternoon without simultaneously announcing a replacement. On November 21, the matchup between the Detroit Lions and New Orleans Saints was flexed into the Sunday night slot. As compensation to Fox because they only had two other games in the early time slot, the league gave them the Denver Broncos–Minnesota Vikings game that was originally to air on CBS. This was the first time that the league moved an interconference telecast to the home team's Sunday afternoon regional broadcaster.

On November 14, the NFL decided to keep the Week 12 matchup between the Pittsburgh Steelers and Kansas City Chiefs on November 27 in place after the league considered flexing it out for other matchups, particularly the AFC East showdown between the Buffalo Bills and the New York Jets and the interconference matchup between the Tampa Bay Buccaneers and the Tennessee Titans, due to the AFC West (of which the Chiefs are a member) being a weak division for 2011.

On December 7, the NFL ended up keeping the Week 15 matchup between the Baltimore Ravens and the San Diego Chargers on December 18, a decision that came a day late due to the NFL Committees meetings that took place on the day before. NBC wanted the game between the New England Patriots and the Denver Broncos as it featured a matchup between Tom Brady and Tim Tebow, two players with high popularity. While CBS did not protect that game, the network was fighting to keep the game since they had lost the aforementioned Week 13 Broncos-Vikings game to Fox, denying the network the earlier chance to capitalize on Tebow's marketability.

On December 14, 2011, the NFL, along with Fox, NBC and CBS, announced a nine-year extension of the league's rights deal with all three networks to the end of the 2022 season. The extended contract includes the continued rotation of the Super Bowl yearly among the three networks, meaning CBS would air Super Bowls XLVII (2013), 50 (2016), LIII (2019), and LVI (2022).

The 2011 Sunday Night Football season ended with an average of 20.7 million viewers and was the highest-rated program of the 2011–12 television season, dethroning American Idol, which was the highest-rated program for eight consecutive seasons. As a further result, Sunday Night Football became the first-ever television sports series of any kind to finish a television season as the most-watched show.

=== 2012 ===
NBC's broadcast of Super Bowl XLVI at the end of the 2011 season became the most-watched program in the history of United States television, with 111.3 million US viewers, according to Nielsen. The game was the first Super Bowl telecast to be streamed live online legally in the U.S., both to computers (via NFL.com and NBCSports.com) and mobile devices (via Verizon Wireless's NFL Mobile app). The game marked Al Michaels' eighth time conducting play-by-play for a Super Bowl (Michaels had previously done play-by-play for Super Bowls XXII, XXV, XXIX, XXXIV, XXXVII and XL for ABC, and Super Bowl XLIII for NBC).

The 2012 schedule, released on April 17, once again placed a Sunday night game (New Orleans Saints at Denver Broncos) against a World Series game. This was the third straight year a World Series game competed against a Sunday night game. During the halftime of that game, NBC News aired a brief special report regarding Superstorm Sandy, anchored by Brian Williams. Sunday night games between November 18 and December 23 (inclusive) were "flex games"; they would revert to Sunday afternoon if a more competitive matchup arose.

After two years of using the unconventional layout, for 2012, a more traditional FoxBox was introduced; team abbreviations (in the team's primary color) are stacked on the left side of the box, with timeout lights positioned underneath each team abbreviation, and a possession indicator to the left of it. The clock/quarter indicator is on the right side. Down and distance pops out of the bottom, while the timeout/penalty/touchdown animation is the same as in the unconventional design of the previous two seasons. Also for the 2012 season, Fox began providing play-by-play commentary of all games in Spanish on its second audio program channel. In 2013, in observance of the holiday season, Christmas lights returned to the FoxBox along the sides of the graphic, but they no longer corresponded to timeouts. When a team scores, calls a timeout or gets called on a penalty, the lights change from red, green and blue to the corresponding team's color for the duration of the graphic, before returning to the normal colors.

For the 2012 NFL season, CBS began providing Spanish play-by-play commentary of all game broadcasts via a secondary audio program feed. Also in 2012, to further prevent issues surrounding late games from delaying primetime programming on the east coast (also influenced by other recent changes slowing the pace of games, such as video reviews and the kickoff for late games being moved from 4:15 to 4:25 p.m. Eastern Time), CBS began to move the start of its primetime schedule to 7:30 p.m. on weeks that the network carries a 4:25 p.m. game.

The only flexed game of the season that displaced a scheduled game took place on December 23; the San Diego Chargers at New York Jets game reverted to the afternoon, and the San Francisco 49ers played in Seattle that night. This resulted in the 49ers playing on consecutive Sunday nights, both on the road (the team played in New England the previous Sunday night, December 16). A portion of the San Francisco-New England game aired on the NBC Sports Network and CNBC due to NBC News' live coverage of Barack Obama's speech following the Sandy Hook Elementary School shooting.

The final Sunday night of the season – December 30, 2012 – likewise was a "flex game"; the slot was left vacant when the schedule was released, as has been the practice of the past four seasons. It was filled by the game between the Dallas Cowboys and the Washington Redskins. Usually announced on the Tuesday before game day (but sometimes before), the game typically highlights a situation in which the winner advances to the playoffs while the loser does not; the winner of this flex game would win its division, although the Redskins would still advance to the playoffs as a wild card team – even if the team lost – if certain other teams lost. After the first 15 games were played that day, which included the Minnesota Vikings clinching the #6 seed in the NFC with a win, the game would turn out to be a winner-take-all, in which the winner would clinch the No. 4 seed in the NFC and the loser would be eliminated regardless. The Redskins would eventually defeat the Cowboys 28–18 and clinch their first NFC East crown since 1999.

Sunday Night Football ranked the most-watched program in the United States during the 2011–12 season. This feat was repeated during the 2013–14 season; in that case, NBC finished the season as the No. 1 network among adults aged 18–49 for the first time since 2004 and #2 in total viewership (behind longtime leader CBS).

=== 2013 ===
Super Bowl XLVII was broadcast for free on the internet on the host network's website, in this case CBSSports.com. CBS charged an average of $4 million for a 30-second commercial during the game, the highest rate for any Super Bowl. According to Nielsen, Super Bowl XLVII was watched by an estimated average total audience of 108.69 million U.S. viewers, with a record 164.1 million tuning into at least six minutes of the game.

CBS also debuted a new graphics package starting with the network's coverage of Super Bowl XLVII. The package was used for all CBS game telecasts beginning with the 2013 season. Originally optimized for a 4:3 display, the elements are now optimized for the 16:9 format as a result of the network's incorporation of the AFD #10 broadcast tag.

The lower third graphics adopt the column layout for player info graphics used by several other sports broadcasters. The portion containing the player's name is stacked on the left, with the team's primary color in the background of the name panel. Other statistics are shown on a gray background on panels to the right. The score banner is gray with team abbreviations listed over their primary color and next to their logo. For Sunday game broadcasts, the NFL on CBS logo is placed on the left; the "NFL" portion disappears and is replaced by the down and distance, "Flag", or "Official Review". Also for the Sunday broadcasts, challenges and statistics drop down from the bar. The only scoring play which used an animation is a touchdown, which involves the team logo and the word "Touchdown" appearing in place of the banner. Timeout indicators are located above the team abbreviations for Sunday broadcasts, and a possession indicator is located to the right of the abbreviation.

The 2013 schedule, released on April 18, once again placed a Sunday night game (Green Bay Packers at Minnesota Vikings) against a World Series game. This was the fourth straight year that a World series game competed against a Sunday night game. Sunday night games between November 17 and December 22 (inclusive) were "flex games", they would revert to Sunday afternoon if a more competitive matchup arose. The final Sunday night of the season – December 29, 2013 – likewise was a "flex game"; the slot was left vacant when the schedule was released, as has been the practice of the past five seasons. The game site (and, by extension, its teams) was determined after the completion of most Week 16 games. It was filled by the game between the Philadelphia Eagles and the Dallas Cowboys.

Beginning with the 2013 season, The NFL Today, along with all other CBS Sports presentations, switched to a 16:9 widescreen presentation that extended or placed graphics outside of the 4:3 safe area, with the network requiring cable television providers to use the #10 Active Format Description tag to present the broadcasts in a letterboxed format for viewers watching a CBS station's standard definition feed.

The league announced on November 1, 2013, that the Week 11 Kansas City Chiefs–Denver Broncos game, originally scheduled as CBS's only late 4:05 p.m. Eastern Time singleheader game, was flexed into the Sunday Night Football, replacing the originally scheduled Green Bay Packers–New York Giants game. CBS originally selected the Chiefs–Broncos matchup as one of their "protected games" from flex-scheduling, but later allowed the league to flex it so it could be seen by a national audience. This would be one of two cases of a team playing on consecutive Sunday nights due to one of the games being moved into the Sunday night slot (as the Broncos would play the New England Patriots the following Sunday night); the Philadelphia Eagles, the other team to play on consecutive Sunday nights, played at home against the Chicago Bears on December 22 and played in Dallas on December 29.

The late-afternoon regional games held on December 1, 2013 (Denver–Kansas City and Cincinnati–San Diego) drew a 16.7 household rating, a 29 share, and 28.106 million viewers from 4:25 to 7:47 p.m. Eastern Time.

On December 2, 2013, the Pittsburgh Tribune-Review reported (via Twitter) that the Week 15 rivalry game between the Steelers and the Cincinnati Bengals for December 15 would remain in the Sunday night slot, a report later confirmed by the NFL. The league had considered flexing the game out due to the Steelers starting the season 0–4, which included a 20–10 loss to the Bengals on Monday Night Football earlier in the season that was more of a blowout than the final score indicated. Ultimately, it was decided to keep the rematch in the Sunday night slot due to the Steelers making a late playoff push, the team's fanbase that provides high ratings regardless of how well the Steelers are doing, as well as a lack of compelling matchups for the week, with only two other pairings that did not have a team with a losing record by the flex deadline (Patriots at Miami Dolphins and Baltimore Ravens at Detroit Lions, the latter being a Monday night game which could not be flexed out of its slot).

On December 10, 2013, the NFL decided to flex the Week 16 Chicago Bears-Philadelphia Eagles matchup into the Sunday night slot, replacing the New England Patriots-Baltimore Ravens matchup, which moved to the late afternoon slot on CBS. The move surprised many in the television industry, as all four teams were strong playoff contenders. Some have speculated that since the Patriots had an opportunity to lock up the AFC East before their game in Baltimore (the Patriots were ultimately upset by the Dolphins 24–20), while the other three teams would not be able to clinch playoff spots (nor would they be eliminated) prior to Week 16, that the Bears-Eagles matchup might be more compelling. There was also speculation that moving the Patriots-Ravens game to the late afternoon slot on CBS gives that network a more compelling matchup in their week to have a doubleheader, as the other two matchups scheduled to air on CBS in the late afternoon slot featured teams that were having down years (Steelers-Packers) or weren't expected to contend for the playoffs and only appealed to their home markets (Raiders-Chargers); the Patriots-Ravens matchup ultimately received CBS's primary broadcasting crew (Jim Nantz and Phil Simms) and national coverage outside the local markets and blacked out markets of the other late games. John Ourand of SportsBusiness Journal reported that the league wanted to keep the total number of games taken from CBS and Fox, dating back to the start of the current television contracts, roughly equal. Otherwise, an obscure rule in the broadcast contracts would have prevented the league from possibly flexing a Week 17 AFC game, originally scheduled to be televised on CBS, to the final Sunday night slot.

No Sunday night Game was originally scheduled for Week 17 of the NFL season, thus allowing the ability to move the most intriguing and playoff-relevant matchup of the week to the Sunday night time slot. The final game of the 2013 NFL regular season was played on December 29, 2013, between the Philadelphia Eagles and Dallas Cowboys to determine the NFC East division champion. The Eagles won by a score of 24–22, thus advancing to the playoffs.

=== 2014 ===
On February 5, 2014, the league announced it had sold off eight weeks of the NFL Network's Thursday Night Football package to CBS, who outbid competitors ABC, Fox, NBC, and Turner Sports. NFL Network would simulcast CBS' Thursday night games from weeks 2 through 8, will continue to carry the Thursday night games from Week 9 onward, and would also carry two Saturday night games (Week 16 doubleheader) for the first time since 2011, with one of those games being simulcast on CBS. All of these games (except for the one NFL Network-only Saturday night game) would be announced by CBS' lead commentating team of Jim Nantz (play-by-play) and Phil Simms (color analyst). The deal with CBS was initially only for the 2014 season, with the league having the option to extend it for an additional season. CBS is paying an additional $275 million for the package. Local CBS affiliates automatically get the local simulcast rights to any game carried only on NFL Network. The league exercised the option to extend its agreement with CBS through the 2015 season.

On February 5, 2014, the NFL announced that a deal with CBS to broadcast Thursday night games during the first eight weeks of the NFL season games beginning the following season in simulcast with NFL Network, with the remainder airing on NFL Network exclusively. With the addition of the package, CBS announced an additional NFL Today broadcast for the games, to be broadcast from the site of each week's game; with James Brown and Bill Cowher to be featured on both the Thursday and Sunday broadcasts, Deion Sanders returning to the program as an analyst for the Thursday editions.

On February 18, 2014, CBS Sports announced that Shannon Sharpe and Dan Marino were being relieved of their duties as on-air commentators, to be replaced by Tony Gonzalez and Bart Scott.

When the 2014 NFL schedule was released on April 23, it placed a Sunday night game (Green Bay Packers at New Orleans Saints) against a World Series game for the fifth straight year. Starting with this season, NBC was permitted to begin flexing games as soon as Week 5, with the restriction that no more than two games may be flexed between Weeks 5 and 10. The final Sunday night of the season – December 28, 2014 – likewise was a flex game; the slot was left vacant when the schedule was released, as had been the practice of the past six seasons. The game's teams (and, by extension, its location) was announced after most week 16 games it was filled by the Cincinnati Bengals and Pittsburgh Steelers. Country/pop superstar Carrie Underwood continued her role as the performer of the Sunday Night Football opener.

This was also the first season of "cross-flexing", enabling CBS to air several NFC away games and Fox to broadcast some AFC away games. The first game that was cross-flexed was the Week One Buffalo Bills at Chicago Bears contest, which aired on Fox instead of CBS.

Sprint Right was retired as the NFL presentation fanfare and was replaced with a newer fanfare.

During the first Thursday edition of The NFL Today on September 11, 2014, in the wake of the domestic violence controversy involving Baltimore Ravens running back Ray Rice, Brown spoke via satellite to CBS News anchor Scott Pelley and spoke face-to-face with CBS News correspondent Norah O'Donnell, who had interviewed NFL Commissioner Roger Goodell days before. Baltimore Ravens owner Steve Bisciotti also appeared in a taped interview with Brown. During the pre-game, Brown updated his 2012 digression about domestic violence, wondering why nothing had been done to change the problem in the two years since his initial commentary and how the problem had actually become worse.

For the 2014 season, Fox's graphics were changed to match those that had previously been introduced on Fox Sports's Major League Baseball and NASCAR coverage. The graphics package is similar to the previous look, however with a more boxy appearance, and the fonts used are rounder and have less of an athletic appearance than previous packages used by Fox. The layout of the score box is essentially a mirror image of the already-introduced MLB graphic, except that the NFL version is on the top-left of the screen, while the baseball version was originally on the bottom-left (it was moved to the bottom-right beginning in 2016). Like the MLB graphic, the box has two components: a main box and a dynamic strip. The main box contains the team abbreviations, stacked on top of the team scores. The possession indicator is a line above the team holding the ball; timeout indicators, which are counting downward, are stacked next to the scores. This unconventional layout of displaying the scores (also used in 2010 and 2011) is only used for NFL coverage; college football and MLB coverage use the traditional layout with the team abbreviations to the left of the scores.

The dynamic strip normally shows the next down that will occur, such as "3rd Down". It changes to show down and distance and the play clock, and turns yellow if a flag is thrown. When a score occurs, the dynamic strip disappears and the main box changes to show the logo of the team scoring, along with the type of score ("TOUCHDOWN", "FIELD GOAL", "SAFETY"). For a penalty, the main box shows the logo of the offending team, while the dynamic strip turns yellow and displays the type of penalty. When a timeout is called, the dynamic strip turns to the color of the team taking the timeout and displays "Timeout", while the main box displays the team's logo over a neutral gray background. After a few seconds, the main box returns to the scores and a small gray box with the team logo appears next to the word "Timeout" in the dynamic strip.

For a review or a challenge, the dynamic strip moves from the bottom to the right side of the main box and turns red, displaying whether it is a challenge, an official review, or a scoring review. When the decision is announced, the strip expands to show the result of the review on a yellow background. After a few seconds, the strip shifts back to the bottom of the main box and if a timeout is charged on a lost challenge, the strip shows the team charged with the timeout.

On November 11, 2014, the NFL announced that the November 23 game between the Dallas Cowboys and New York Giants game would air as scheduled, even though the Detroit Lions–New England Patriots game was considered to be a better matchup, citing that the Cowboys are one of the most popular NFL teams playing in the country's largest media market.

For the first time since flexed scheduling went into effect, no Sunday night games were flexed during the season other than Week 17 (where the matchup is usually determined as late as six days prior to the Sunday of Week 17).

On December 21, 2014, the NFL announced that the rivalry game between the Pittsburgh Steelers and Cincinnati Bengals would be flexed into the Week 17 Sunday Night Football slot, with the winner clinching the AFC North. The league considered flexing the Atlanta Falcons–Carolina Panthers game into the Sunday night slot as it decided the NFC South while the loser would be eliminated, but the division being historically weak (it was assured to have a division winner with a losing record by the end of Week 16), combined with the Steelers being a major draw, led to the league's decision. With the Steelers and Bengals clinching a playoff spot in Week 16, it also marked the first time since the NFL scheduled all-intradivisional matchups in Week 17 in 2010 that a game flexed to the Week 17 slot featured at least one team (in this case both) that was already in the playoffs. It was later reported by Sports Illustrated columnist Peter King that the league chose to flex the Steelers-Bengals game because CBS has not had a game flexed in the Week 17 slot since 2009; the aforementioned Falcons-Panthers matchup was later cross-flexed to CBS.

=== 2015 ===
NBC's broadcast of Super Bowl XLIX at the end of 2014 season became the most-watched program in the history of United States Television, with 114.4 million US viewers, according to Nielsen. The game was the fourth overall telecast to be streamed live online legally in the U.S. both to computers (via NFL.com and NBCSports.com) for the second time and mobile devices (via Verizon Wireless's NFL Mobile app). The game marked Al Michaels ninth time conducting play-by-play for a Super Bowl (Michaels had previously done play-by-play for Super Bowls XXII, XXV, XXIX, XXXIV, XXXVII and XL for ABC and XLIII and XLVI for NBC).

For the game live-streamed on Yahoo in 2015, all silver "CBS" marks in the graphics package were replaced by purple "Yahoo" logos. The game used the top-screen version of the scoring banner.

The 2015 schedule was released on April 21, 2015. The defending Super Bowl champions the New England Patriots faced the Pittsburgh Steelers during the NFL Kickoff Game on Thursday, September 10, 2015. Other notable games included the Seattle Seahawks versus the Green Bay Packers (Week 2) and the New England Patriots versus the Indianapolis Colts (Week 6) in a rematch of their respective conference championship games. It also placed a Sunday night game (Green Bay Packers at Denver Broncos) against a World Series game for the sixth straight year. The final Sunday night game of the season – January 3, 2016 – likewise was a flex game; the slot was left vacant when the schedule came out as has been the practice over the past seven seasons. The game's teams (and by extension, its location) was announced after most Week 16 games. It was filled by the Minnesota Vikings at Green Bay Packers. The Arizona Cardinals wound up playing on consecutive Sunday nights — at the Seattle Seahawks in Week 10 and then, at home against the Cincinnati Bengals in Week 11 (Cardinals won both of those games), with the latter being flexed into the Sunday night slot.

In November 2015, The Hollywood Reporter reported that in response to the success of the package under CBS, the NFL was planning to negotiate a long-term contract for Thursday Night Football, with CBS, Fox, NBC, and Turner Sports showing interest. The New York Post reported that this deal would also include the sale of a stake in NFL Network itself.

On December 16, 2015, it was reported that the NFL was shopping the Thursday Night Football package as a one-year deal with an option for a second year, similarly to the current arrangement with CBS; the league also requested that bidders outline goals for "growing" NFL Network. The league was also reportedly interested in selling non-exclusive digital rights to simulcast the games to another partner, such as Amazon.com, Apple Inc., Google, or Yahoo! (which exclusively streamed an International Series as part of a trial during the 2015 season, but would shut down its original video content service in January 2016). In January 2016, it was reported that the NFL was considering splitting the Thursday Night Football package across multiple broadcasters in tandem with the possibility of expanding the overall package to 17 games. It was also reported that ESPN and Turner Sports were not interested in the package due to its short-term nature, and that Fox was attempting to outbid CBS.

The December 20 game (Cincinnati Bengals at San Francisco 49ers) reverted to the afternoon, replaced by the Arizona Cardinals-Philadelphia Eagles game. The Minnesota Vikings also wound up playing on consecutive Sunday nights beginning in Week 16 at home against the New York Giants and on the road in Week 17 against the Green Bay Packers.

=== 2016 ===
The NFL copyright warning was slightly updated to "This broadcast is copyrighted by NFL Productions for the private use of our audience. Any other use of this telecast, or any pictures, descriptions or accounts of the game without the consent of NFL Productions is prohibited." The copyright disclaimer was read by Scott Graham, who replaced Earl Mann after eighteen years.

On February 1, 2016, the league announced that NBC had won a partial share of Thursday Night Football rights for the 2016 season; as a result, five additional Thursday night games (in addition the kickoff and Thanksgiving contests) in the later part of the season had been added to NBC's schedule. NBC Sports was also responsible for producing five games that was exclusive to NFL Network. After the 2017 season, NBC insisted on a reduced rights fee in order to continue carrying Thursday Night Football, which the NFL rejected; Fox was then awarded the rights to Thursday Night Football for the remainder of the time left on the league's broadcast contracts. NBC will continue to carry the kickoff and Thanksgiving night games on Thursdays.

Beginning with the network's February 7, 2016 broadcast of Super Bowl 50, and continuing with the network's broadcast of Super Bowl LIII, CBS Sports debuted a new logo along with a new on-air graphics package that is optimized for the 16:9 format. The new graphics were rolled out on all of CBS Sports' other properties (including the network's joint production of NCAA March Madness with Turner Sports) in subsequent months.

The score bar is now located at the bottom of the screen for all broadcasts, no matter what day they take place on. The CBS eye logo is at the far left. If there is no down and distance displayed, the word "NFL" accompanies the logo. The down-and-distance display, which was previously shown on the left side of the bar, is now shown on the right side of the bar. When it appears, the "NFL" on the other side of the bar disappears. Possession of the ball is indicated by the background color in the down-and-distance display. The play clock is now located to the right of the game clock. The timeout indicators, which are now shown as white dash marks, are located below the team's abbreviation, both placed against the team's main color. The team logo is to the left of the abbreviation. The score is in a darker shade of the team's color to the right. Whenever a team scores a touchdown, the graphic displays the team's wordmark, followed by "TOUCHDOWN" before the graphic returns to normal. Beginning with Week 6 of the 2017 NFL season, the records for each team were displayed to the right of the timeout indicators. During the playoffs and Week 1 of the 2018 season, the records are not displayed.

The new "NFL on CBS" logo reversed the order, now reading "CBS NFL", and is constantly present in the upper-right corner of the screen.

However, the new package was not implemented for CBS's reduced schedule of early-season Thursday Night Football broadcasts, which continued to use the previous set (with CBS logos continuing to be replaced by generic TNF logos). The 2013 graphics continued to be used on 2017 TNF broadcasts. Also in 2017, for CBS-produced games airing only on NFLN, the 2013 graphics continued to be used, but with the "CBS TNF" logo modified to "NFL TNF," using the NFL shield in place of the CBS eye logo and the word "CBS". CBS ceased airing the Thursday games after 2017.

A version of this package was used during all games of the short lived Alliance of American Football league in the Spring of 2019, with all CBS branding replaced with AAF branding for non-CBS games (the AAF was also broadcast on Turner Sports and the NFL Network).

The 2016 schedule was released on April 14, 2016. NBC's first telecast of the season featured a rematch of Super Bowl 50 when the Denver Broncos played host to the Carolina Panthers, the first time the Super Bowl participants faced each other in Week 1 of the subsequent year since 1970. It also placed a Sunday night game (Philadelphia Eagles at Dallas Cowboys) against a World Series game for the seventh straight year. The Thanksgiving night match-up featured the Pittsburgh Steelers against the Indianapolis Colts, and for the first time since 2011, NBC carried a Christmas Day game as the Broncos traveled to play the Kansas City Chiefs, a rematch of the Week 12 game in Denver that was flexed into that week's Sunday night slot. In addition, NBC carried five late season Thursday Night Football games in conjunction with NFL Network in a similar arrangement to the one NFLN has with CBS. As before, flexible scheduling rules went into effect in Week 5, with Week 16 excluded because the majority of the schedule was played on Christmas Eve. The final Sunday night game of the season – Sunday, January 1, 2017 – likewise was a flex game; the slot was left vacant when the schedule came out as has been the practice over the past eight seasons. The game's teams (and by extension, its location) was announced after most Week 16 games. It was filled by the Green Bay Packers at Detroit Lions.

Also this season, NBC was home to two Super Bowl rematches. As previously mentioned, the Carolina vs. Denver game was a rematch of Super Bowl 50. Then, 9 weeks later on a Sunday night, the Patriots hosted the Seattle Seahawks in a rematch of Super Bowl XLIX, a game that was also seen on NBC, on February 1, 2015.

On September 11, 2016, The NFL Today debuted a new program logo, replacing a variation of the previous logo used since the 2006 NFL season.

Also on September 11, 2016, Fox NFL Sunday was broadcast on location in Houston (the host city of Super Bowl LI) for the start of the 2016 NFL season. This also marked Curt Menefee's tenth season as full-time host of the pregame show. While the crew did the pregame, halftime and post-game shows, Charissa Thompson (host of Fox NFL Kickoff) served as the studio host and anchored the in-game highlights.

For Fox's regular season games only, beginning with Week 3 of 2016, the record for each team was added to the box, making the team abbreviations of each team smaller.

Fox gradually worked elements of a new square-edged graphics package with thinner fonts into secondary situations during the 2016 season. This package (in white instead of black) was used for Fox's Super Bowl LI pregame, halftime, and post game shows, but the game broadcast itself continued to use the 2014 package. However, the translucent shading around the scoreboard was removed for the Super Bowl.

The Week 5 game between the New York Giants and the Green Bay Packers was placed against the second presidential debate. The debate did not air on NBC due to contractual obligations but was carried by several other channels including sister networks CNBC and MSNBC.

The Week 7 game between the Seattle Seahawks and the Arizona Cardinals ended in a 6–6 tie following a missed field goal from each team in the last minutes of overtime. This became not only the first tie to be featured on Sunday Night Football, but also the first tie not to see a touchdown since 1972, as well as the lowest scoring tie, and the second lowest score in the prime time slot.

For 2016 and 2017, the league split a ten-game package of Thursday night games between NBC and CBS, with each paying an estimated $225 million per season for five games; CBS's games would be in the early part of the season as before, while NBC's would cover later in the season. Under the terms of NFL Network's retransmission agreements with cable providers, the NFL has included a stipulation requiring seven games in the Thursday Night Football package to be carried solely on NFL Network; for the 2018 season, potential bidders were free to place a bid on a package ranging from anywhere between four and eleven games. Fox, the winning bidder, bought all eleven games that were up for bids. As the eighteen total games involve more time slots than can be accommodated with the fourteen Thursday night time slots (excluding the kickoff, Thanksgiving, and the last week of the season when no Thursday game is played), four of the games are played on days other than Thursdays (usually this involves at least one game in London in a Sunday morning time slot and the remainder on Saturdays, all NFL Network exclusives), or if Christmas lands on a Monday, either a Christmas Eve or Christmas Day game.

The first game produced by NBC Sports was broadcast exclusively on NFL Network on November 3, 2016, while the first game simulcast nationally on NBC aired on November 17. A cappella group Pentatonix recorded a reworked version of their song "Sing" ("Weekend Go") to serve as the opening theme song for NBC's Thursday Night Football telecasts; NBC also commissioned new instrumental theme music by Jimmy Greco, "Can't Hold Us Down", which was performed by members of the orchestra from the Broadway musical Hamilton. Both were retained for NBC's games in 2017.

After the addition of Thursday Night Football to NBC's rights holdings, the network elected to give Al Michaels time off. Mike Tirico, who left ESPN to become the heir apparent to Michaels at NBC, called select telecasts in his place.

On December 4, 2016, the NFL announced that it had flexed the Tampa Bay Buccaneers-Dallas Cowboys game into the Sunday night slot for Week 15, replacing the originally-scheduled Pittsburgh Steelers-Cincinnati Bengals game, which was moved to the 1:00 p.m. ET slot as the early game on CBS. As a result, the Cowboys wound up playing on consecutive Sunday nights — on the road against the New York Giants in Week 14 (which they lost, 10–7) & then at home against the Buccaneers in Week 15 (which they won, 26–20), and as a result, the Cowboys wound up playing back-to-back-to-back games on NBC, beginning with their post-Thanksgiving Thursday Night Game against Minnesota, their scheduled Week 14 game against the Giants, as mentioned, and their Week 15 Game against Tampa Bay, which was also previously mentioned.

Bart Scott and Tony Gonzalez both left The NFL Today prior to the 2017 season, with Gonzalez switching networks to join Fox's pregame coverage. Phil Simms, who had been demoted from CBS's lead color commentator position when the network hired Tony Romo for that post, and Nate Burleson, who comes over from NFL Network, replaced Scott and Gonzalez.

=== 2017 ===
On January 15, 2017, NBC was scheduled to carry an AFC divisional playoff game with the Chiefs at home against the Steelers in the afternoon; on January 13, the NFL announced that game would move to primetime on NBC the same day due to an ice storm affecting the Kansas City area which would cause perilous travel for fans if the game went on as regularly scheduled, and thus becoming an unexpected bonus Sunday Night Football broadcast in its regular timeslot. NBC filled the vacated afternoon timeslot with an NHL game between the Philadelphia Flyers and Washington Capitals.

On April 4, 2017, it was announced that Amazon.com had acquired non-exclusive streaming rights to the 10 broadcast television games for the 2017 season over their Amazon Prime Video service, under a deal valued at $50 million, a five-fold increase over the $10 million paid by Twitter. The streams will be exclusive to paid Prime subscribers. The deal includes $30 million worth of promotion. Amazon planned several special features for its inaugural game, including broadcasting alternate feeds with Spanish, Portuguese and British English commentary (the last of which being intended for those unfamiliar with the rules and terminology of American football), and a pre-show hosted by Tiki Barber and Curtis Stone that featured presentations of NFL merchandise available for purchase on Amazon.

Starting on August 27, 2017, after three years of using the unconventional layout from the previous graphics package, a new, traditional score bar was introduced. The score bug was moved from the top left to across the bottom of the screen and is now horizontal. Additionally, team names are displayed instead of their abbreviations and the clock is located towards the right of the bug and the down and distance is displayed on the far right. Also, timeout indicators are shown below the team names and the possession indicator, which was originally shown below the team's score (through Week 4 of the 2017 NFL season), is now shown above the team's score. When showing stats or player info, the score bug briefly moves to the bottom left of the screen then returns to its previous position. With this, all five of the NFL's broadcast partners (CBS, ESPN, Fox, NBC and NFL Network) now have score bars across the bottom of the screen, with Fox being the last of the five to make the switch.

The graphics package itself is an upgraded version of the 2014 design and was eventually rolled out on almost all of Fox Sports' properties, including Fox's college football and basketball coverage on Fox and FS1, the 2017 MLB postseason and in February 2018, NASCAR on Fox.

Following his retirement from the NFL, Tony Romo was hired by CBS Sports to be the lead color analyst for the network's NFL telecasts, working in the booth alongside play-by-play announcer Jim Nantz, replacing Phil Simms, who was moved to the studio for The NFL Today.

While there was no controversy of Romo deciding to retire and move on to broadcasting, some critics questioned Romo being immediately hired for the number one position ahead of broadcasting veterans Dan Fouts, Trent Green, or Rich Gannon, all of whom served in the number 2–4 positions respectively for CBS, with Fouts having once been the color commentator on Monday Night Football. While some critics had speculated that Romo was handed the top position so quickly because he wore a star on his helmet, other reports cited CBS having grown tired of Simms in the role, which was a mutual feeling by Simms himself. Nonetheless, none of the ex-players and coaches in a lead position on other networks at the time of Romo's hiring (Troy Aikman, Cris Collinsworth, and Jon Gruden) started their broadcasting career in the lead position. Simms jokingly asked Romo "How does that seat feel?" during Week 1 of The NFL Today.

Once the 2017 NFL season got underway, Romo received critical praise for his work as a recent ex-player, most notably for his ability to predict offensive plays and read defensive formations from the booth, and "adding an enthusiasm that had been lacking with Simms".

The November 16, 2017 telecast between the Pittsburgh Steelers and Tennessee Titans was the first NFL broadcast to intentionally use the Skycam as its primary camera angle, as opposed to the usual sideline camera that has been used since telecasts of NFL games began in 1939. NBC Sports had previously switched to a skycam-only presentation for portions of two Sunday night games earlier that season because of fog and smoke (and, sixteen years prior, during its coverage of the XFL); positive reaction to the impromptu change prompted NBC to experiment with using the strategy for the full game. The Skycam Angle was also used for the December 14 telecast between the Denver Broncos and the Indianapolis Colts.

=== 2018 ===
On January 31, 2018, the NFL announced that Fox had acquired the broadcast television rights to the Thursday Night Football package from 2018 through 2022. Fox will air eleven games per season in simulcast with NFL Network, replacing CBS and NBC. Fox will reportedly pay an average of $660 million per season for this package.

NBC debuted a new graphics package specifically for Sunday Night Football during Super Bowl LII. Producer Fred Gaudelli stated that the network wanted SNF to have a more distinctive presentation to set them apart from other NBC Sports telecasts. For the 2018 season, NBC also debuted a new on-air feature known as the "green zone"; on third downs, the distance from the line of scrimmage to the first down line is digitally shaded on the field to be a darker shade of green. The feature received mixed reviews from critics and viewers, who considered it distracting and redundant to the existing yellow first down line that had historically been a standard feature of U.S. football telecasts. The Ringer's Rodger Sherman considered it "the ultimate conclusion of graphics creep". Gaudelli stated that the green zone was developed for when Skycam is used as a primary camera angle, but it was decided to use the effect on all games.

With TNF moving to Fox in 2018, the network announced that its top team of Joe Buck and Troy Aikman will call the games this year. The duo will be joined by Erin Andrews, who normally works with Buck and Aikman on Sundays, and Kristina Pink, who normally works with the #3 team for Fox, which consists of Kenny Albert, son of former NFL commentator Marv Albert, and Super Bowl Champion Ronde Barber, and Mike Pereira, who is one of two rule analysts for Fox.

For Thursday Night Football, the yellow-and-black "Fox NFL" logo on-screen and on graphics and transitions is replaced by a blue-and-white "Fox NFL Network" logo. In some transitions, it is instead replaced by the full "TNF presented by Bud Light" logo. Fox also produces NFL Network exclusives on non-Fox/NBC Thursdays, on some Sunday mornings, and on late-season Saturdays; these games replace the "Fox NFL" logo with an NFL Network logo on a black square, the size of the "Fox NFL" logo.

NBC's first telecast of the season was on September 6, 2018, featured the Super Bowl Champion Philadelphia Eagles defeating the Atlanta Falcons.

For the ninth season in a row, the NFL placed a game against a World Series game, with the (New Orleans Saints at Minnesota Vikings), going up against the fifth (and final) game of the Fall Classic, between the Los Angeles Dodgers against the Boston Red Sox.

This was also the first season since 2015, that Thursday Night Football was not on NBC, as it moved to fellow NFL broadcaster Fox for the next five years. Despite the loss of TNF, NBC still broadcast the Kickoff Game and the Thanksgiving prime time games (both on a Thursday night) as they fall under the current NBC contract.

This marked the seventh year in the Sunday night package that a prime time Thanksgiving game was shown on NBC which featured the Atlanta Falcons against the New Orleans Saints. However, the studio team of Mike Tirico, Tony Dungy and Rodney Harrison called the game in place of Michaels and Collinsworth.

Flexible scheduling rules went into effect Week 5. If a more compelling matchup arose as the season progressed, the previously scheduled Sunday Night matchup could be swapped with the more competitive game's time slot.

On October 14, 2018, the NFL announced via press release, that the NFL GameDay Morning studio team of Rich Eisen, Steve Mariucci, Kurt Warner, and Michael Irvin, would be calling the Eagles-Jaguars London Game on October 28. They will be joined by Melissa Stark, who is making her first appearance as a sideline reporter since ABC's coverage of Super Bowl XXXVII, and Peter Schrager, from Fox Sports, and NFL Network's Good Morning Football.

=== 2019 ===
To accommodate the NFL's 100th Anniversary, a special NFL presentation fanfare by David Robidioux was used. The copyright disclaimer music is changed to only include drums and is now read by Jeffery Ryan.

Tony Romo and Jim Nantz received further acclaim for their broadcasting of the 2018 AFC Championship Game between the Kansas City Chiefs and New England Patriots, as "Nantz continually set Romo up to make his predictions and analysis prior to the snap", and some suggested that Chiefs head coach "Andy Reid could have used Romo on his defensive staff, because the former quarterback knew just about every play the Patriots were going to run down the stretch". According to British daily newspaper The Guardian, the "beauty of Romo’s analysis is that it feels like he’s in on the fun with you." Romo and Nantz called Super Bowl LIII in Atlanta.

CBS's coverage of Super Bowl LIII utilized a total of 115 cameras, including 8K resolution cameras (for the first time in a U.S. network sports telecast) in the end zones, as well as field-level and "up close" augmented reality graphics (with the latter generated from a wireless, handheld camera). Initial overnight Nielsen Ratings measured a 44.9 rating for the game, down 5% from the previous year and the lowest rating for a Super Bowl since Super Bowl XLIII ten years prior. 98.2 million viewers were measured, the fewest since Super Bowl XLII. Jemele Hill of The Atlantic attributed the low ratings "to the game being the lowest-scoring Super Bowl ever, moderate national interest in the Los Angeles Rams, the lingering bad taste from New Orleans Saints fans regarding the huge blown call in the NFC Championship Game, and Patriots fatigue".

The 2019 schedule was released on April 17. However, on March 25, the NFL announced that, in a break from tradition, the Kickoff Game would not be hosted by the reigning Super Bowl champions and would instead feature the Chicago Bears hosting the Green Bay Packers at Soldier Field on September 5, with that game airing on NBC. The New England Patriots however, hosted the first Sunday Night Football game of the season against the Pittsburgh Steelers during Week 1 on NBC. It also placed a World Series game against a Sunday night game for the tenth year in a row with the Green Bay Packers against the Kansas City Chiefs. Thanksgiving featured a rematch of the previous season's Primetime Thanksgiving Game between the New Orleans Saints and the Atlanta Falcons. It was the eighth time that the Thanksgiving game was part of the Sunday Night Football package shown on NBC.

Flexible scheduling rules went into effect in Week 5; the scheduled game reverted to the afternoon if a more compelling matchup arose. The scheduled Sunday Night Football matchup could have been swapped with the more competitive game's time slot. The final Sunday night game of the season Sunday December 29, 2019 likewise was a flex game; the slot was left blank when the schedule came out. The game's teams (and, by extension, its location) were announced after most Week 16 games. The games and times were announced at a later date.

== See also ==
- NFL on television
- History of the NFL on television
- List of NFL Championship Game broadcasters
- List of Super Bowl broadcasters
- History of Monday Night Football
