= Meizu M10 =

2019 smartphone model

- Manufacturer: Meizu
- Type: Smartphone
- Series: M
- First released: September 2019; 6 years ago
- Predecessor: Meizu M8
- Compatible networks: GSM, 3G, 4G (LTE)
- Form factor: Slate
- Colors: Phantom Black, Sea Blue, Purplish Red
- Dimensions: 164.87×76.33×8.45 mm (6.491×3.005×0.333 in)
- Weight: 184 g (6 oz)
- Operating system: Android 9 Pie
- System-on-chip: MediaTek MT6757T Helio P25 (16 nm)
- CPU: 8 cores (4×2.5 GHz Cortex-A53 & 4×1.6 GHz Cortex-A53)
- GPU: Mali-T880 MP2
- Memory: 2/3 GB LPDDR4X
- Storage: 32 GB eMMC 5.1
- Removable storage: microSDXC up to 128 GB
- SIM: Hybrid Dual SIM (Nano-SIM)
- Battery: Non-removable, Li-Po 4000 mAh
- Charging: 10 W
- Rear camera: 13 MP, f/2.0 (wide-angle), PDAF + 2 MP, f/2.2 (macro) + 2 MP, f/2.2 (depth sensor); LED flash, HDR, panorama Video: 1080p@30fps
- Front camera: 8 MP, f/2.0 HDR; Video: 1080p@30fps
- Display: IPS LCD, 6.5", 1600 × 720 (HD+), 19.5:9, 270 ppi
- Sound: Mono speaker
- Connectivity: MicroUSB 2.0, 3.5 mm Audio, Bluetooth 4.2 (A2DP, LE), Wi-Fi 802.11 b/g/n (hotspot), GPS, A-GPS, GLONASS, BeiDou
- Other: Fingerprint scanner (rear-mounted), accelerometer, proximity sensor, compass

Meizu M10 is a smartphone developed by Meizu, part of the "M" series of budget smartphones. It was unveiled in September 2019. In Ukraine, the device was presented on October 12, 2019, along with the Meizu Note 9.

== Design ==
The screen is made of glass, while the back panel and frame are made of glossy plastic.

Below are the microUSB port, speaker, microphone, and 3.5 mm audio jack. On the left side of the smartphone, there is a hybrid slot for 2 SIM cards or 1 SIM card and a microSD memory card up to 128 GB. On the right side are the volume buttons and the lock button. The fingerprint scanner is located on the back panel.

In Ukraine, the Meizu M10 was sold in 3 colors: Phantom Black (black), Sea Blue (blue), and Purplish Red (purplish-red).

== Technical specifications ==
=== Processor ===
The smartphone is equipped by the MediaTek Helio P25 processor and Mali-T880 MP2 graphics processor.

=== Battery ===
The battery capacity of the phone is 4000 mAh.

=== Camera ===
The smartphone features a 13 MP triple main camera module, f/1.7 (wide-angle) with phase autofocus + 2 MP, f/2.2 (macro) + 2 MP, f/2.2 (depth sensor), and an 8 MP front camera (wide-angle), f/2.0. Both cameras can record video at 1080p@30fps.

=== Display ===
The phone's display is an IPS LCD, 6.5", 1600 × 720 (HD+) with a 19.5:9 aspect ratio, 270 ppi pixel density, and a waterdrop notch for the front camera.

=== Storage ===
The smartphone was sold in 2/32 and 3/32 GB configurations. In Ukraine, the smartphone was only available in the 3/32 GB configuration.

=== Software ===
The smartphone was released with "clean" Android 9 Pie with some pre-installed Meizu applications.

== See also ==
- Meizu Note 9
