= Meizu M6s =

2018 smartphone by Meizu

Meizu M6s (Mblu S6/ Meizu S 2018 in China)
- Brand: Meizu/Mblu
- Manufacturer: Meizu
- Type: Smartphone
- Series: M
- First released: January 17, 2018; 8 years ago
- Availability by region: Worldwide: M6s; China: Blue Charm S6
- Predecessor: Meizu M5s
- Related: Meizu M6; Meizu M6T; Meizu M6 Note
- Compatible networks: GSM, 3G, 4G (LTE)
- Form factor: Monoblock
- Colors: Black, Silver, Gold, Blue
- Dimensions: 152×72.5×8 mm (5.98×2.85×0.31 in)
- Weight: 160 g (6 oz)
- Operating system: Initial: Android 7.0 Nougat + Flyme 6.2 (China) or Flyme 6.3.1.0G (Global); Current: Android 7.0 Nougat + Flyme 8.0.5.0A/Flyme 8.19.12.17A beta (China) or Flyme 7.1.6.0G (Global)
- CPU: Samsung Exynos 7872 (14 nm), 6 cores (4×1.6 GHz Cortex-A53 & 2×2.0 GHz Cortex-A73)
- GPU: Mali-G71 MP1
- Memory: 3 GB, LPDDR3
- Storage: 32/64 GB, eMMC 5.1
- Removable storage: MicroSDXC up to 128 GB
- Battery: Non-removable, Li-Ion 3000 mAh
- Charging: Fast charging mCharge at 18 W
- Rear camera: 16 MP Samsung S5K2P7, f/2.0, 1/2.8", 1.12 μm, PDAF; 2-LED dual-tone flash Video: 1080p@30fps
- Front camera: 8 MP Samsung S5K4H7, f/2.0 (wide-angle), 1/4.0", 1.12 μm Video: 1080p@30fps
- Display: IPS LCD, 5.7", 1440 × 720 (HD+), 18:9, 282 ppi
- Connectivity: microUSB 2.0, 3.5 mm Audio, Bluetooth 4.2 (A2DP, LE), Wi-Fi 802.11 a/b/g/n (dual-band, Wi-Fi Direct, hotspot), GPS, A-GPS, GLONASS
- Other: Fingerprint scanner (side-mounted), accelerometer, gyroscope, proximity sensor, compass

The Meizu M6s (Mblu S6/ Meizu S 2018 in China) is an Android smartphone developed by Meizu, which is part of the M series. It was introduced on January 17, 2018. This is the first Meizu smartphone with an 18:9 aspect ratio. It is the successor to the Meizu M5s.

== Design ==
The screen is made of glass. The smartphone body is made of aluminum.

At the bottom there is a microUSB connector, a speaker, a microphone and a 3.5 mm audio jack. On the left side there are volume control buttons and a hybrid slot for 2 SIM cards, or 1 SIM card and a microSD memory card up to 128 GB. On the right side there is a smartphone lock button and a fingerprint scanner.

The Meizu M6s was sold in 4 colors: Black, Silver, Gold and Blue.

== Technical specifications ==
=== Platform ===
The smartphone received a Samsung Exynos 7872 processor and a Mali-G71 MP1 graphics processor.

=== Battery ===
The battery received a capacity of 3000 mAh and support for fast charging mCharge at 18 W.

=== Camera ===
The smartphone received a main 16 MP, f/2.0 camera with phase autofocus and the ability to record video in 1080p@30fps resolution. The front camera received a resolution of 8 MP (wide-angle), an aperture of f/2.0 and the ability to record video in 1080p@30fps resolution.

=== Display ===
IPS LCD screen, 5.7'', 1440 x 720 (HD+) with an aspect ratio of 18:9 and a pixel density of 282 ppi.

=== Memory ===
The smartphone was sold in configurations of 3/32 and 3/64 GB.

=== Software ===
The smartphone was released on Flyme 6.2 (China version) or Flyme 6.3.1.0G (Global version), which was based on Android 7.0 Nougat. It was updated to Flyme 8.0.5.0A/Flyme 8.19.12.17A beta (China version) or Flyme 7.1.6.0G (Global version) which both still based on Android 7.0 Nougat.

==== Control ====
In order to reduce the bezels around the display and to follow up the trending 18:9 display type which was in 2017-2018, Meizu had to remove the mechanical mBack button. There are three ways to navigate the device: the on-screen Super mBack button in the form of a ring and the standard 3 Android navigation buttons, or the swiping gesture later added in future Flyme versions (similar to the iPhone X).

The area where the Super mBack ring is located was made pressure-sensitive (something similar to 3D Touch technology). It is controlled similarly to the mechanical mBack.

== Reception ==
A reviewer from the information portal ITC.ua gave the Meizu M6s a score of 4 out of 5. He attributed the lack of NFC and Type-C, display color rendering and nuances of Flyme OS to the disadvantages. The reviewer attributed the design, screen with a 2 to 1 aspect ratio, original control scheme, fast fingerprint scanner, updated platform, decent cameras and fast charging to the advantages.

A reviewer from Pingvin.Pro gave the smartphone a score of 5.7 out of 10. He attributed the metal body, appearance, processor, dimensions, screen, cameras and battery life to the advantages of the smartphone. He attributed the power button, fingerprint scanner placement, microUSB, firmware, memory speed and graphics to the disadvantages.
