= Native resolution =

Fixed resolution of a flat-panel display

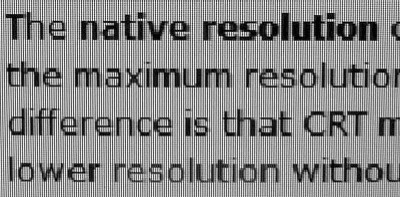
Example of non-native display (video driver setting of 800x600 as displayed through a native 1024x768 LCD)

The native resolution of a liquid crystal display (LCD), liquid crystal on silicon (LCoS) or other flat panel display refers to its single fixed resolution. As an LCD consists of a fixed raster, it cannot change the resolution to match the signal being displayed as a cathode-ray tube (CRT) monitor can, meaning that optimal display quality can be reached only when the signal input matches the native resolution. An image where the number of pixels is the same as in the image source and where the pixels are perfectly aligned to the pixels in the source is said to be pixel perfect.

While CRT monitors can usually display images at various resolutions, an LCD monitor has to rely on interpolation (scaling of the image), which causes a loss of image quality. An LCD has to scale up a smaller image to fit into the area of the native resolution. This is the same principle as taking a smaller image in an image editing program and enlarging it; the smaller image loses its sharpness when it is expanded. This is especially problematic as most resolutions are in a 4:3 aspect ratio (640×480, 800×600, 1024×768, 1280×960, 1600×1200) but there are odd resolutions that are not, notably 1280×1024. If a user were to map 1024×768 to a 1280×1024 screen there would be distortion as well as some image errors, as there is not a one-to-one mapping with regard to pixels. This results in noticeable quality loss and the image is much less sharp.

In theory, some resolutions could work well, if they are exact multiples of smaller image sizes. For example, a 1600×1200 LCD could display an 800×600 image well, as each of the pixels in the image could be represented by a block of four on the larger display, without interpolation. Since 800×600 is an integer factor of 1600×1200, scaling should not adversely affect the image. But in practice, most monitors apply a smoothing algorithm to all smaller resolutions, so the quality still suffers for these "half" modes.

Most LCD monitors are able to inform the PC of their native resolution using Extended display identification data (EDID); however, some LCD TVs, especially those with 1366x768 pixels, fail to provide their native resolution and only provide a set of lower resolutions, resulting in a less than pixel perfect output.

Some widescreen LCD monitors optionally display lower resolutions without scaling or stretching an image, so the image will always be in full sharpness. However, it will not occupy the full screen. This is most often recognizable upon close inspection, as there will typically be black edges visible on either side of the panel horizon.

== See also ==
- 1:1 pixel mapping
- Resolution independence
