= Nominal analogue blanking =

Outermost part of the overscan of a standard definition digital television image

Nominal analogue blanking is the outermost part of the overscan of a standard definition digital television image. It consists of a gap of black (or nearly black) pixels at the left and right sides, which correspond to the end and start of the horizontal blanking interval: the front porch at the right side (the end of a line, before the sync pulse), and the back porch at the left side (the start of a line, after the sync pulse and before drawing the next line). Digital television ordinarily contains 720 pixels per line, but only 702 (PAL) to 704 (NTSC) of them contain picture content. The location is variable, since analogue equipment may shift the picture sideways in an unexpected amount or direction.

The exact width is determined by taking the definition of the time required for an active line in PAL or NTSC, and multiplying it by the pixel clock of 13.5 MHz of Digital SDTV. PAL is exactly 52 μs, so it will equate to exactly 702 pixels.

Notably, screen shapes and aspect ratios were defined in an era of purely analogue broadcasting for TV. This means that any picture with nominal analogue blanking, whether it be 702, around 704, or less, will be — by definition — a 4:3 picture. Therefore, when cross-converting into a square-pixel environment (like MPEG-4 and its variants), this width must always scale to 768 (PAL) or 640 (NTSC). This has the outcome of causing a full picture of 720x576 or 720x480 to be wider than 4:3. In fact, a purely digitally sourced SDTV image, with no analogue blanking, will be close to 788 × 576 or 655 × 480 once stretched to square pixels.

Standard definition widescreen pictures were also defined in an analogue environment and must also be treated as such. This means that a purely digitally sourced widescreen SDTV image, with no analogue blanking, will be close to 1050 × 576 or 873 × 480.

For details, see the technical specifications of overscan amounts.

== See also ==
- Safe area
- Vertical blanking interval
