= Meizu 16X =

- Brand: Meizu
- Manufacturer: Meizu
- Type: Smartphone
- First released: September 19, 2018; 7 years ago
- Predecessor: Meizu 15 Lite
- Successor: Meizu 16Xs
- Related: Meizu 16th Meizu X8
- Compatible networks: GSM, 3G, 4G (LTE)
- Form factor: Slate
- Colors: Black, White, Gold
- Dimensions: 151×73.5×7.5 mm (5.94×2.89×0.30 in)
- Weight: 154 g (5 oz)
- Operating system: Original: Android 8.0 Oreo + Flyme 7.1; Current: Android 10 + Flyme 8.1
- CPU: Qualcomm SDM710 Snapdragon 710 (10 nm), Octa-core (2x2.2 GHz 360 Gold & 6x1.7 GHz Kryo 360 Silver)
- GPU: Adreno 616
- Memory: 6 GB, LPDDR4X
- Storage: 64/128 GB, UFS 2.1
- Battery: Non-removable, Li-Ion 3100 mAh
- Charging: 18W mCharge 4 fast charging
- Rear camera: 12 MP Sony IMX380, f/1.8 (wide), 1/2.3", 1.55 µm, dual pixel PDAF, Laser AF, 4-axis OIS + 20 MP, f/2.6 (telephoto), 1/2.6", 1.0 µm, AF; 6-LED dual-tone flash, Auto-HDR, panorama Video: 4K@30fps, 1080p@30fps; gyro-EIS
- Front camera: 20 MP Sony IMX376, f/2.0 (wide), 1/2.8", 1.0 µm, PDAF; 1080p@30fps
- Display: Super AMOLED, 6.0", 2160 × 1080 (FullHD+), 18:9, 402 ppi
- Connectivity: USB-C 2.0, 3.5 mm Audio, Bluetooth 5.0 (A2DP, LE), Wi-Fi 802.11 a/b/g/n/ac (dual-band, Wi-Fi Direct, hotspot), GPS, A-GPS, GLONASS, BeiDou
- Other: Fingerprint scanner (under display, optical), accelerometer, gyroscope, proximity sensor, compass

Meizu 16X is a mid-range smartphone developed by Meizu. It was introduced on September 19, 2018, alongside the Meizu X8 and Meizu V8 and V8 Pro.

== Design ==
The screen is made of glass. In white, the smartphone body is made of ceramic, while in all other colors, it is made of aluminum.

The USB-C port, speaker, microphone, and 3.5 mm audio jack are located at the bottom. The second microphone is located at the top. On the left side, there is a slot for 2 SIM cards. On the right side, there are the volume buttons and the power button.

The Meizu 16X was sold in 3 colors: Black, White and Gold.

== Technical specifications ==
=== Hardware ===
The smartphone is powered by a Qualcomm Snapdragon 710 processor and an Adreno 616 GPU.

=== Battery ===
The battery has a capacity of 3100 mAh and supports 18W mCharge 4 fast charging.

=== Camera ===
The smartphone received a dual rear camera setup featuring a main 12 MP, f/1.8 (wide) and a 20 MP, f/2.6 (telephoto) with Dual Pixel laser and phase detection autofocus, optical image stabilization (OIS), and the ability to record video in 4K@30fps. The front camera has a resolution of 20 MP (wide), an f/2.0 aperture, and can record video in 1080p@30fps.

=== Display ===
The 16X features a 6.0" Super AMOLED with a resolution of 2160 × 1080 (FullHD+), an 18:9 aspect ratio, and a pixel density of 402 ppi. A fingerprint scanner is also built under the display.

=== Memory ===
The smartphone was sold in 6/64 GB and 6/128 GB configurations.

=== Software ===
The smartphone was released with Flyme 7.1, based on Android 8.0 Oreo. It was later updated to Flyme 8.1 based on Android 10.
