= Meizu M6 =

2017 Android smartphone by Meizu

- Brand: Meizu
- Manufacturer: Meizu
- Type: Smartphone
- Series: Meizu M Series
- First released: September 22, 2017; 8 years ago
- Predecessor: Meizu M5
- Successor: Meizu M8
- Related: Meizu M6s; Meizu M6T; Meizu M6 Note
- Compatible networks: GSM, 3G 4G (LTE)
- Form factor: Monoblock
- Colors: Moonlight Silver, Champagne Gold, Matte Black, Electric Light Blue
- Dimensions: 148.2×72.8×8.3 mm (5.83×2.87×0.33 in)
- Weight: 143 g (5 oz)
- Operating system: Initial: Android 7.0 Nougat + Flyme 6.2 (China variant)/ Flyme 6.2.0.3G (International variant); Current: Android 7.0 Nougat + Flyme 7.1.2.0G (International)/ Flyme 8.0.5.0A (Chinese variant(
- System-on-chip: MediaTek MT6750 (28 nm)
- CPU: Octa-core (4×1.5 GHz Cortex-A53 & 4×1.0 GHz Cortex-A53)
- GPU: Mali-T860
- Storage: 16/32 GB, eMMC 5.1
- SIM: Dual SIM
- Battery: Li-Ion 3070 mAh, non-removable
- Charging: Fast charging 24W mCharge
- Rear camera: 13 MP Sony IMX278, f/2.2, 28 mm (wide angle), 1/3.06", 1.12 μm, PDAF; 2-LED dual-tone flash Video: 1080p@30fps
- Front camera: 8 MP OmniVision OV8856, f/2.0 (Wide-angle), 1/4.0", 1.12 μm 1080p@30fps
- Display: IPS LCD, 5.2", 1280 × 720 (HD), 16:9, 282 ppi
- Connectivity: microUSB 2.0, 3.5 mm Audio, Bluetooth 4.1 (A2DP, LE), Wi-Fi 802.11 a/b/g/n (dual-band, hotspot), GPS, A-GPS, GLONASS, Digital compass

The Meizu M6 is an Android-based smartphone developed by Meizu and is part of the M series. It was unveiled on September 22, 2017. It is the successor to the Meizu M5.

== Design ==
The screen is made of glass. The phone's body is made of plastic with a metallic coating.

At the bottom, there's a microUSB connector, a speaker, and a microphone stylized to look like a speaker. At the top, there's a 3.5 mm audio jack. On the left side of the smartphone, there's a hybrid slot for either two SIM cards or one SIM card and a microSD memory card up to 128 GB. On the right side are the volume buttons and the power button. The fingerprint scanner is embedded in the mTouch navigation button.

The Meizu M6 was sold in four colors: Matte Black, Moonlight Silver, Champagne Gold, and Electric Light Blue.

== Technical specifications ==
=== Processor ===
The smartphone is powered with the MediaTek MT6750 processor, which was previously found in the Meizu M5 and Meizu M3s models, and a Mali-T860 graphics processor.

=== Battery ===
The phone's battery has a capacity of 3070 mAh and supports 24 W mCharge 4 fast charging.

=== Camera ===
The smartphone has a 13 MP main camera with an f/2.2 aperture (wide-angle) and phase-detection autofocus, capable of recording video in 1080p resolution at 30 frames per second. The front camera has an 8 MP resolution (wide-angle), an f/2.0 aperture, and can record video in 1080p resolution at 30 frames per second.

=== Display ===
The display has a 5.2-inch IPS LCD display with a 1280x720 HD resolution, a 16:9 aspect ratio, and a pixel density of 282 ppi.

=== Storage ===
The smartphone was sold in configurations of 2/16 GB and 3/32 GB.

=== Software ===
The smartphone was launched with Flyme 6.2 (Chinese version)/ Flyme 6.2.0.3G (Global version), which was based on Android 7.0 Nougat. It was later updated to Flyme 8.0.5.0A (China variant)/ Flyme 7.1.2.0G (Global variant). Both still based on Android 7.0 Nougat.

== Reception ==
A reviewer from the information portal ITC.ua gave the Meizu M6 a rating of 3.5 out of 5. Among the cons, he mentioned the minimally changed design and low performance. The reviewer praised the affordable price, high-quality screen, and battery life of the device. In conclusion, he stated that it's a decent smartphone that doesn't look to its competitors. There's no point in replacing an old model with a new one, but it could be suitable as a first smartphone or a replacement for an old model, although there are more interesting options available.

The reviewer from Pingvin.Pro gave the smartphone a rating of 4.2 out of 10. The reviewer praised the phone's design and connectivity. However, they criticized the screen, plastic body, hardware platform, optimization, software, cameras, and battery life. In conclusion, the reviewer stated: "The Meizu M6 is a good budget phone from the company that you won't be ashamed to use. Yes, it's far from perfect, but it also doesn't have any significant flaws that would make you want to reject it."

The reviewer from Root-Nation criticized the smartphone for its overly boring design, screen, platform, camera, and battery. The reviewer named Flyme and high-quality software as the smartphone's main advantages. In conclusion, they said that the smartphone performs its basic functions well. However, there are competitors that offer better features for the same price.
