= Display resolution =

Width and height of a display in pixels

This chart shows the most common display resolutions, with the color of each resolution type indicating the display ratio (e.g., red indicates a 4:3 ratio). Printable variant is available here.

The display resolution or display modes of a digital television, computer monitor, or other display device is the number of distinct pixels in each dimension that can be displayed. It can be an ambiguous term, especially as the displayed resolution is controlled by different factors in cathode-ray tube (CRT) displays, flat-panel displays (including liquid-crystal displays) and projection displays using fixed picture-element (pixel) arrays.

It is usually quoted as width × height, with the units in pixels: for example, 1024 × 768 means the width is 1024 pixels and the height is 768 pixels. This example would normally be spoken as "ten twenty-four by seven sixty-eight" or "ten twenty-four by seven six eight".

One use of the term display resolution applies to fixed-pixel-array displays such as plasma display panels (PDP), liquid-crystal displays (LCD), Digital Light Processing (DLP) projectors, OLED displays, and similar technologies, and is simply the physical number of columns and rows of pixels creating the display (e.g. 1920 × 1080). A consequence of having a fixed-grid display is that, for multi-format video inputs, all displays need a "scaling engine" (a digital video processor that includes a memory array) to match the incoming picture format to the display.

For device displays such as phones, tablets, monitors and televisions, the use of the term display resolution as defined above is a misnomer, though common. The term display resolution is usually used to mean pixel dimensions, the maximum number of pixels in each dimension (e.g. 1920 × 1080), which does not tell anything about the pixel density of the display on which the image is actually formed: resolution properly refers to the pixel density, the number of pixels per unit distance or area, not the total number of pixels. In digital measurement, the display resolution would be given in pixels per inch (PPI). In analog measurement, if the screen is 10 inches high, then the horizontal resolution is measured across a square 10 inches wide. For television standards, this is typically stated as "lines horizontal resolution, per picture height"; for example, analog NTSC TVs can typically display about 340 lines of "per picture height" horizontal resolution from over-the-air sources, which is equivalent to about 440 total lines of actual picture information from left edge to right edge.

== Background ==
1080p progressive scan HDTV, which uses a 16:9 ratio

Some commentators also use display resolution to indicate a range of input formats that the display's input electronics will accept and often include formats greater than the screen's native grid size even though they have to be down-scaled to match the screen's parameters (e.g. accepting a 1920 × 1080 input on a display with a native 1366 × 768 pixel array). In the case of television inputs, many manufacturers will take the input and zoom it out to "overscan" the display by as much as 5% so input resolution is not necessarily display resolution.

The eye's perception of display resolution can be affected by a number of factors – see image resolution and optical resolution. One factor is the display screen's rectangular shape, which is expressed as the ratio of the physical picture width to the physical picture height. This is known as the aspect ratio. A screen's physical aspect ratio and the individual pixels' aspect ratio may not necessarily be the same. An array of 1280 × 720 on a 16:9 display has square pixels, but an array of 1024 × 768 on a 16:9 display has oblong pixels.

An example of pixel shape affecting "resolution" or perceived sharpness: displaying more information in a smaller area using a higher resolution makes the image much clearer or "sharper". However, most recent screen technologies are fixed at a certain resolution; making the resolution lower on these kinds of screens will greatly decrease sharpness, as an interpolation process is used to "fix" the non-native resolution input into the display's native resolution output.

While some CRT-based displays may use digital video processing that involves image scaling using memory arrays, ultimately "display resolution" in CRT-type displays is affected by different parameters such as spot size and focus, astigmatic effects in the display corners, the color phosphor pitch shadow mask (such as Trinitron) in color displays, and the video bandwidth.

== Aspects ==
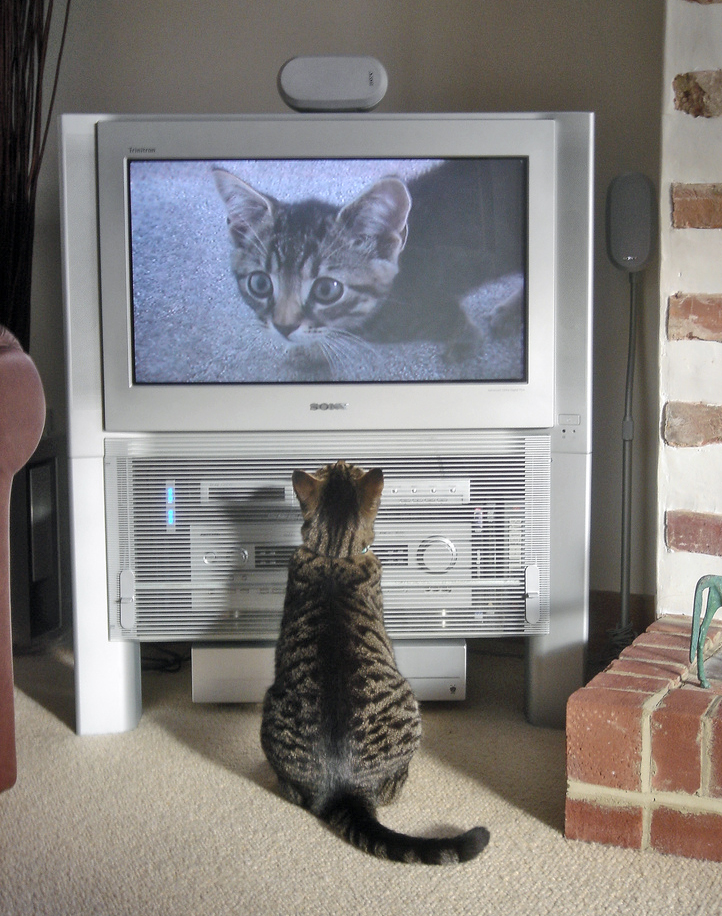
A 16:9-ratio television from October 2004 (In the back of the composition)

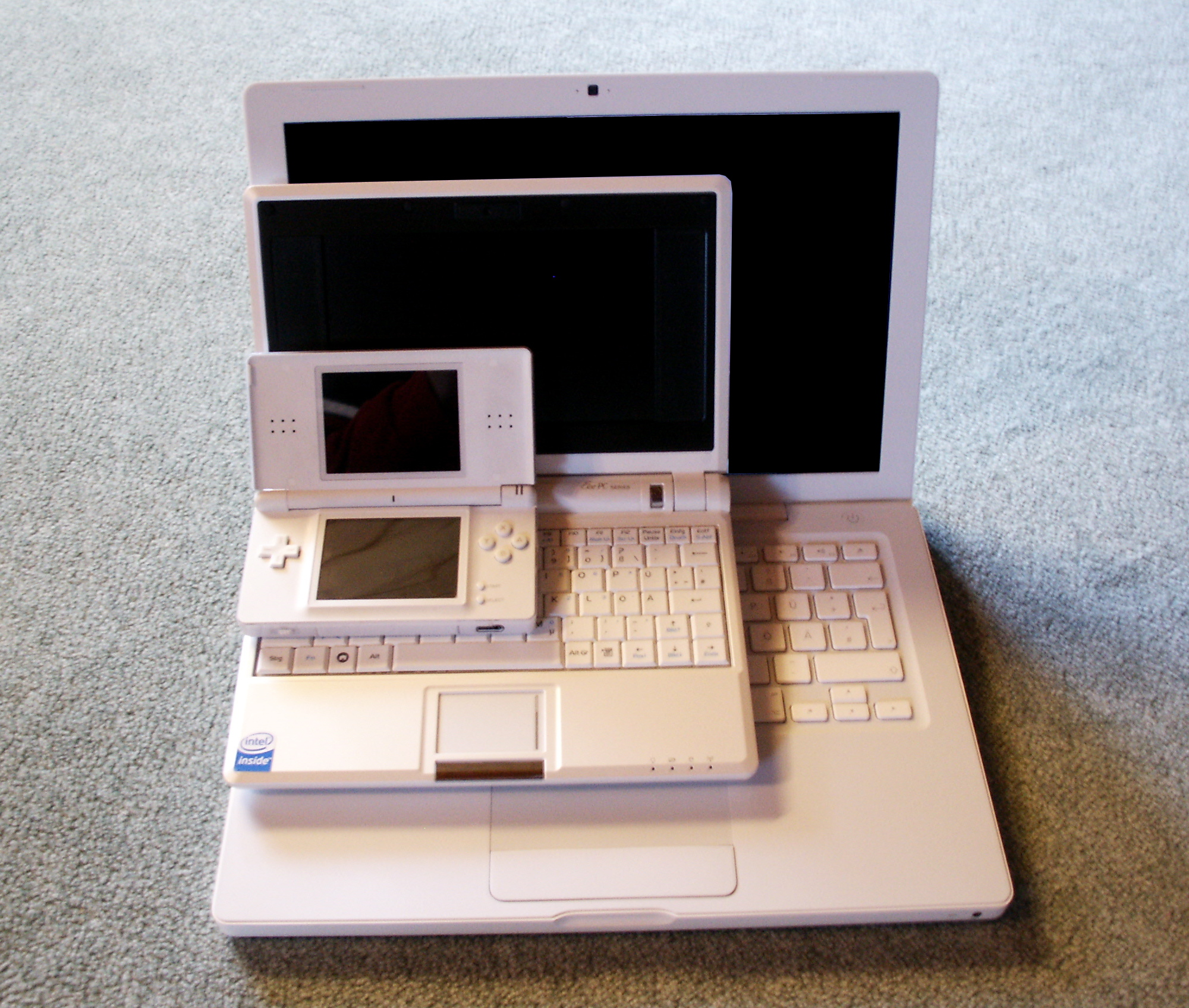
Difference between screen sizes in some common devices, specifically a Nintendo DS Lite, an Asus Eee PC, and an Apple MacBook

=== Overscan and underscan ===
Most television display manufacturers "overscan" the pictures on their displays (CRTs and PDPs, LCDs etc.), so that the effective on-screen picture may be reduced from 720 × 576 (480) to 680 × 550 (450), for example. The size of the invisible area somewhat depends on the display device. Some HD televisions do this as well, to a similar extent.

Computer displays including projectors generally do not overscan although many models (particularly CRT displays) allow it. CRT displays tend to be underscanned in stock configurations, to compensate for the increasing distortions at the corners.

=== Interlaced versus progressive scan ===
Interlaced video (also known as interlaced scan) is a technique for doubling the perceived frame rate of a video display without consuming extra bandwidth. The interlaced signal contains two fields of a video frame captured consecutively. This enhances motion perception to the viewer, and reduces flicker by taking advantage of the phi phenomenon.

The European Broadcasting Union has argued against interlaced video in production and broadcasting. The main argument is that no matter how complex the deinterlacing algorithm may be, the artifacts in the interlaced signal cannot be completely eliminated because some information is lost between frames. Despite arguments against it, television standards organizations continue to support interlacing. It is still included in digital video transmission formats such as DV, DVB, and ATSC. New video compression standards like High Efficiency Video Coding are optimized for progressive scan video, but sometimes do support interlaced video.

Progressive scanning (alternatively referred to as noninterlaced scanning) is a format of displaying, storing, or transmitting moving images in which all the lines of each frame are drawn in sequence. This is in contrast to interlaced video used in traditional analog television systems where only the odd lines, then the even lines of each frame (each image called a video field) are drawn alternately, so that only half the number of actual image frames are used to produce video.

== Televisions ==
=== Current standards ===
Televisions are of the following resolutions:

- Standard-definition television (SDTV):
  - 480i (NTSC-compatible digital standard employing two interlaced fields of 240 lines each)
  - 576i (PAL-compatible digital standard employing two interlaced fields of 288 lines each)
- Enhanced-definition television (EDTV):
  - 480p (720 × 480 progressive scan)
  - 576p (720 × 576 progressive scan)
- High-definition television (HDTV):
  - 720p (1280 × 720 progressive scan)
  - 1080i (1920 × 1080 split into two interlaced fields of 540 lines)
  - 1080p (1920 × 1080 progressive scan)
- Ultra-high-definition television (UHDTV):
  - 4K UHD (3840 × 2160 progressive scan)
  - 8K UHD (7680 × 4320 progressive scan)

== Film industry ==
As far as digital cinematography is concerned, video resolution standards depend first on the frames' aspect ratio in the film stock (which is usually scanned for digital intermediate post-production) and then on the actual points' count. Although there is not a unique set of standardized sizes, it is commonplace within the motion picture industry to refer to "nK" image "quality", where n is a (small, usually even) integer number which translates into a set of actual resolutions, depending on the film format. As a reference consider that, for a 4:3 (around 1.33:1) aspect ratio which a film frame (no matter what is its format) is expected to horizontally fit in, n is the multiplier of 1024 such that the horizontal resolution is exactly 1024•n points. For example, 2K reference resolution is 2048 × 1536 pixels, whereas 4K reference resolution is 4096 × 3072 pixels. Nevertheless, 2K may also refer to resolutions like 2048 × 1556 (full-aperture), 2048 × 1152 (HDTV, 16:9 aspect ratio) or 2048 × 872 pixels (Cinemascope, 2.35:1 aspect ratio). It is also worth noting that while a frame resolution may be, for example, 3:2 (720 × 480 NTSC), that is not what you will see on-screen (i.e. 4:3 or 16:9 depending on the intended aspect ratio of the original material).

== Computer monitors ==
Computer monitors have traditionally possessed higher resolutions than most televisions.

=== Evolution of standards ===
In this image of a Commodore 64 startup screen, the overscan region (the lighter-coloured border) would have been barely visible when shown on a normal television.

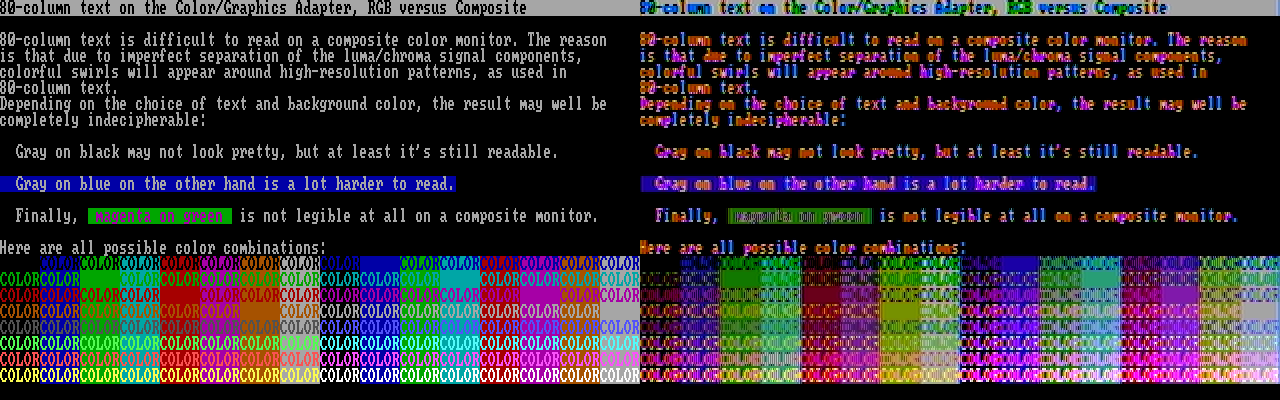
A 640 × 200 display as produced by a monitor (left) and television (right)

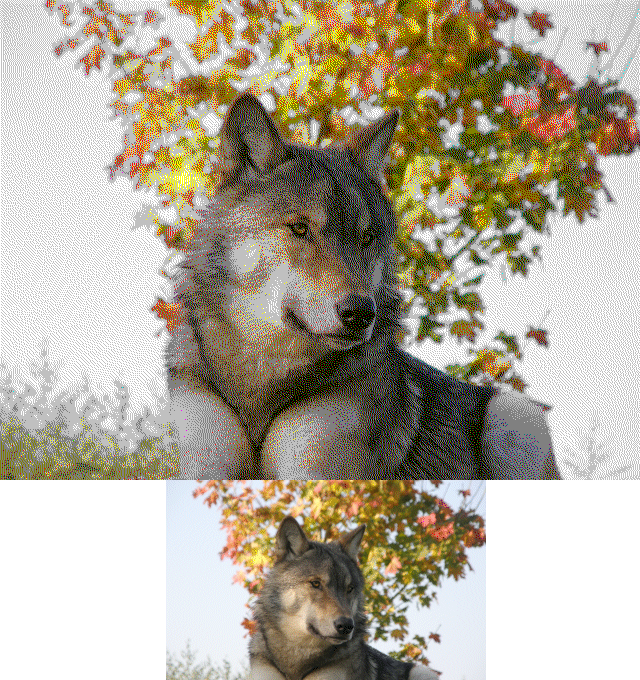
16-color (top) and 256-color (bottom) progressive images from a 1980s VGA card. Dithering is used to overcome color limitations.

Many personal computers introduced in the late 1970s and the 1980s were designed to use television receivers as their display devices, making the resolutions dependent on the television standards in use, including PAL and NTSC. Picture sizes were usually limited to ensure the visibility of all the pixels in the major television standards and the broad range of television sets with varying amounts of over scan. The actual drawable picture area was, therefore, somewhat smaller than the whole screen, and was usually surrounded by a static-colored border (see image below). Also, the interlace scanning was usually omitted in order to provide more stability to the picture, effectively halving the vertical resolution in progress. 160 × 200, 320 × 200 and 640 × 200 on NTSC were relatively common resolutions in the era (224, 240 or 256 scanlines were also common). In the IBM PC world, these resolutions came to be used by 16-color EGA video cards.

One of the drawbacks of using a classic television is that the computer display resolution is higher than the television could decode. Chroma resolution for NTSC/PAL televisions are bandwidth-limited to a maximum 1.5 MHz, or approximately 160 pixels wide, which led to blurring of the color for 320- or 640-wide signals, and made text difficult to read (see example image below). Many users upgraded to higher-quality televisions with S-Video or RGBI inputs that helped eliminate chroma blur and produce more legible displays. The earliest, lowest cost solution to the chroma problem was offered in the Atari 2600 Video Computer System and the Apple II+, both of which offered the option to disable the color and view a legacy black-and-white signal. On the Commodore 64, the GEOS mirrored the Mac OS method of using black-and-white to improve readability.

The 640 × 400i resolution (720 × 480i with borders disabled) was first introduced by home computers such as the Amiga and, later, Atari Falcon. These computers used interlace to boost the maximum vertical resolution. These modes were only suited to graphics or gaming, as the flickering interlace made reading text in word processor, database, or spreadsheet software difficult. (Modern game consoles solve this problem by pre-filtering the 480i video to a lower resolution. For example, Final Fantasy XII suffers from flicker when the filter is turned off, but stabilizes once filtering is restored. The computers of the 1980s lacked sufficient power to run similar filtering software.)

The advantage of a 720 × 480i overscanned computer was an easy interface with interlaced TV production, leading to the development of Newtek's Video Toaster. This device allowed Amigas to be used for CGI creation in various news departments (example: weather overlays), drama programs such as NBC's seaQuest and The WB's Babylon 5.

In the PC world, the IBM PS/2 VGA (multi-color) on-board graphics chips used a non-interlaced (progressive) 640 × 480 × 16 color resolution that was easier to read and thus more useful for office work. It was the standard resolution from 1990 to around 1996. The standard resolution was 800 × 600 until around 2000. Microsoft Windows XP, released in 2001, was designed to run at 800 × 600 minimum, although it is possible to select the original 640 × 480 in the Advanced Settings window.

Programs designed to mimic older hardware such as Atari, Sega, or Nintendo game consoles (emulators) when attached to multiscan CRTs, routinely use much lower resolutions, such as 160 × 200 or 320 × 400 for greater authenticity, though other emulators have taken advantage of pixelation recognition on circle, square, triangle and other geometric features on a lesser resolution for a more scaled vector rendering. Some emulators, at higher resolutions, can even mimic the aperture grille and shadow masks of CRT monitors.

In 2002, 1024 × 768 eXtended Graphics Array was the most common display resolution. Many web sites and multimedia products were re-designed from the previous 800 × 600 format to the layouts optimized for 1024 × 768.

The availability of inexpensive LCD monitors made the 5∶4 aspect ratio resolution of 1280 × 1024 more popular for desktop usage during the first decade of the 21st century. Many computer users including CAD users, graphic artists and video game players ran their computers at 1600 × 1200 resolution (UXGA) or higher such as 2048 × 1536 QXGA if they had the necessary equipment. Other available resolutions included oversize aspects like 1400 × 1050 SXGA+ and wide aspects like 1280 × 800 WXGA, 1440 × 900 WXGA+, 1680 × 1050 WSXGA+, and 1920 × 1200 WUXGA; monitors built to the 720p and 1080p standard were also not unusual among home media and video game players, due to the perfect screen compatibility with movie and video game releases. A new more-than-HD resolution of 2560 × 1600 WQXGA was released in 30-inch LCD monitors in 2007.

In 2010, 27-inch LCD monitors with the 2560 × 1440 resolution were released by multiple manufacturers, and in 2012, Apple introduced a 2880 × 1800 display on the MacBook Pro. Panels for professional environments, such as medical use and air traffic control, support resolutions up to 4096 × 2160 (or, more relevant for control rooms, 1∶1 2048 × 2048 pixels).

=== Common display resolutions ===
Common display resolutions (N/A = not applicable)
Standard	Aspect ratio	Width (px)	Height (px)	Megapixels	Steam (%)	StatCounter (%)
WXGA	16:9	1280	720	0.922	0.36	4.82
WXGA	16:10	1280	800	1.024	0.61	3.08
SXGA	5:4	1280	1024	1.311	1.24	2.47
HD	≈16:9	1360	768	1.044	1.55	1.38
HD	≈16:9	1366	768	1.049	10.22	23.26
WXGA+	16:10	1440	900	1.296	3.12	6.98
HD+	16:9	1600	900	1.440	2.59	4.14
UXGA	4:3	1600	1200	1.920	N/A	N/A
WSXGA+	16:10	1680	1050	1.764	1.97	2.23
FHD	16:9	1920	1080	2.074	64.81	20.41
WUXGA	16:10	1920	1200	2.304	0.81	0.93
UWFHD	≈21:9	2560	1080	2.765	1.13	N/A
QHD	16:9	2560	1440	3.686	6.23	2.15
WQXGA	16:10	2560	1600	4.096	<0.58	<2.4
UWQHD	≈21:9	3440	1440	4.954	0.87	N/A
4K UHD	16:9	3840	2160	8.294	2.12	N/A
Other					2.00	15.09

In recent years the 16:9 aspect ratio has become more common in notebook displays, and 1366 × 768 (HD) has become popular for most low-cost notebooks, while 1920 × 1080 (FHD) and higher resolutions are available for more premium notebooks.

When a computer display resolution is set higher than the physical screen resolution (native resolution), some video drivers make the virtual screen scrollable over the physical screen thus realizing a two dimensional virtual desktop with its viewport. Most LCD manufacturers do make note of the panel's native resolution as working in a non-native resolution on LCDs will result in a poorer image, due to dropping of pixels to make the image fit (when using DVI) or insufficient sampling of the analog signal (when using VGA connector). Few CRT manufacturers will quote the true native resolution, because CRTs are analog in nature and can vary their display from as low as 320 × 200 (emulation of older computers or game consoles) to as high as the internal board will allow, or the image becomes too detailed for the vacuum tube to recreate (i.e., analog blur). Thus, CRTs provide a variability in resolution that fixed resolution LCDs cannot provide.

== See also ==
- Display aspect ratio
- Display size
- List of common display resolutions
- Pixel density of computer displays – PPI (for example, a 20-inch 1680 × 1050 screen has a PPI of 99.06)
- Resolution independence
- Ultrawide formats
- Video scaler
- Widescreen
