= Meizu M6 Note =

Smartphone

- Manufacturer: Meizu
- Type: Touchscreen smartphone
- Series: Meizu M Series
- First released: 2017
- Predecessor: Meizu M5 Note
- Successor: Meizu Note 8
- Compatible networks: GSM, UMTS, HSPA, LTE
- Weight: 173 g (6.1 oz)
- Operating system: Before: Flyme OS 6.1.4.0G, based on Android 7.1.2 Nougat Now: Flyme OS 7.1.1.0G, based on Android 7.1.2 Nougat
- System-on-chip: Qualcomm MSM8953 Snapdragon 625
- CPU: Octa-core 2.0 GHz ARM Cortex-A53
- GPU: Adreno 506
- Memory: 3/4GB
- Storage: 16/32/64GB
- Removable storage: microSDXC, supports up to 128 GB
- SIM: Dual SIM
- Battery: 4000 mAh Li-Ion rechargeable battery, Non removable
- Rear camera: Dual 12 MP + 5 MP, f/1.9, phase detection autofocus, quad-LED (dual tone) flash
- Front camera: 16 MP, f/2.0, 1080p
- Display: 5.5 inch diagonal TDDI; 1920x1080 px
- Connectivity: 3.5 mm TRS connector, Bluetooth 4.0 with BLE, Dual-band WiFi
- Data inputs: Multi-touch IPS LCD capacitive touchscreen, A-GPS, GLONASS, BDS, Accelerometer, Gyroscope, Proximity sensor, Digital compass
- Other: Dual SIM support with dual standby mode, 3D Press force touch technology, Infrared proximity sensor, gyroscope

The Meizu M6 Note is a smartphone designed and produced by the Chinese manufacturer Meizu, which runs on Flyme OS, Meizu's modified Android operating system.

There is an improved variant, named M6s, with a 5.7-inch display (and more specs).

== See also ==
- Meizu
- Meizu M6
- Meizu M3 Max
- Meizu M5
