= Safe area (television) =

Visible portion of picture on TV screen

Safe areas on a PAL screen. Invisible area Action-safe area Title-safe area

Safe area is a term used in television production to describe the areas of the television picture that can be seen on television screens.

Older televisions can display less of the space outside of the safe area than ones made more recently. Flat panel screens, plasma displays and liquid crystal display (LCD) screens generally can show most of the picture outside the safe areas.

The use of safe areas in television production ensures that the most important parts of the picture are seen by the majority of viewers.

The size of the title-safe area is typically specified in pixels or percent. The NTSC and PAL analog television standards do not specify official overscan amounts, and producers of television programming use their own guidelines.

Some video editing software packages for non-linear editing systems (NLE) solutions have a setting which shows the safe areas while editing.

== Title-safe area ==
A simulation of text on a TV falling outside the title-safe area

The title-safe area or graphics-safe area is, in television broadcasting, a rectangular area which is far enough in from the four edges, such that text or graphics show neatly: with a margin and without distortion. This is applied against a worst case of on-screen location and display type. Typically corners would require more space from the edges, but due to increased quality of the average display this is no longer the concern it used to be, even on CRTs.

If the editor of the content does not take care to ensure that all titles are inside the title-safe area, some titles in the content could have their edges chopped off when viewed in some screens.

Video editing programs that can output video for either television or the Web can take the title-safe area into account. In Apple's consumer-grade NLE software iMovie, the user is advised to uncheck the QT Margins checkbox for content meant for television, and to check it for content meant only for QuickTime on a computer. Final Cut Pro can show two overlay rectangles in both its Viewer and Canvas; the inner rectangle is the title-safe area and the outer rectangle is the action-safe area.

In the illustration, the green area is referred to as the "title-safe" area (note that these colors are for illustration only and do not appear on the television screens). This area will be seen by all television screens, no matter when they were made, unless the user has modified the settings. The term "title-safe" originated from the fact this is where it is safe to display text such as lower thirds or full-screen graphics listing information such as telephone numbers.

== Action-safe area ==
Depending on how a television set is adjusted, viewers can see a larger area than the title-safe area. The action-safe area is a larger rectangle, consisting of the green title-safe area and a rectangle around it shown in yellow. As of 2007, most television stations and networks will place information within this area. This area can be considered the "margin" of the television screen in that picture elements are generally kept out of this area to create a buffer around the edge of the screen so elements don't pile up against the edge of the screen. If the station uses a permanent digital on-screen graphic, it is placed just near the corner of the yellow area.

However, the yellow area might be used if the television station wants the information to block against the edge of the screen. Many stations (e.g. BBC News) place tickers that run horizontally in some of the yellow area.

Action-safe area is applied against a worst case of on-screen location and display type.

== Overscan ==
The red border in the illustration represents the overscan, the area of the active picture outside the action-safe area. It is not shown on most consumer television screens, unless the user modifies the television's settings. It is generally considered safe to have elements that shouldn't be seen by the viewers placed in this area, such as the edge of the set or cables and other equipment. However, some television production personnel don't place anything in this area they don't want viewers to see because the red area is always transmitted and could potentially be seen by a viewer with the correct equipment. Television stations generally have professional-grade monitors that can be put into "underscan" mode. These monitors often include white lines showing where the title-safe and safe areas are located. In addition, TV tuner cards and DVD players for personal computers often show the entire picture.

The action-safe area (green + yellow) and overscan area (red) make up the entire transmitted image, or active picture.

In addition to active picture, analog broadcast signals contain blanking areas that provide timings and control. When applying digital compression such as MPEG-4, it is only sensible to compress picture that actually exists, and active picture is what is used — including areas not available in action-safe areas. Other formats such as MPEG-2 have many ties to analogue broadcasting, and employ only a few set sizes; thus always capturing nominal analogue blanking in addition to the active picture next to it.

Since there are such a wide variety of television screens that may display pictures slightly differently, programs produced in 4:3 aspect ratio are transmitted with picture information in the yellow and red areas to ensure the picture takes up the entire screen with no black area around the edges. Widescreen programs in 14:9 or 16:9 aspect ratio, on the other hand, are produced with zero overscan at the top and bottom of the picture, where the letterbox bars appear on a 4:3 television.
