= Meizu Note 8 =

Smartphone

- Brand: Meizu
- Manufacturer: Meizu
- Type: Smartphone
- Series: Note
- First released: October 25, 2018; 7 years ago
- Predecessor: Meizu M6 Note
- Successor: Meizu Note 9
- Related: Meizu M8; Meizu M8c
- Compatible networks: GSM, 3G, 4G (LTE)
- Form factor: Slate
- Colors: Black, Blue, Red, Pink
- Dimensions: 153.6×75.5×7.9 mm (6.05×2.97×0.31 in)
- Weight: 168 g (6 oz)
- Operating system: Initial: Android 8.1 Oreo + Flyme 7.1; Current: Android 8.1 Oreo + Flyme 8.1
- CPU: Qualcomm SDM632 Snapdragon 632 (14 nm), Octa-core (4×1.8 GHz Kryo 250 Gold & 4×1.8 GHz Kryo 250 Silver)
- GPU: Adreno 506
- Memory: 4 GB, LPDDR3
- Storage: 64 GB, eMMC 5.1
- Battery: Non-removable, Li-Ion 3600 mAh
- Charging: 24 W mCharge 4 fast charging
- Rear camera: 13 MP Samsung S5K2L7/Sony IMX362, f/1.9 (wide-angle), 1/2.55", 1.4 μm, Dual Pixel PDAF + 5 MP, f/2.4 (depth sensor); Dual-LED dual-tone flash, panorama Video: 1080p@30fps
- Front camera: 8 MP, f/2.0 (wide-angle); 1080p@30fps
- Display: IPS LCD, 6.0", 2160 × 1080, 18:9, 402 ppi
- Connectivity: microUSB 2.0, 3.5 mm Audio, Bluetooth 4.2 (A2DP, LE), Wi-Fi 802.11 a/b/g/n (dual-band, hotspot), GPS, A-GPS, GLONASS, BDS
- Data inputs: Fingerprint reader (rear-mounted), accelerometer, gyroscope, proximity sensor, compass, Hall sensor

Meizu Note 8 is a mid-range Android smartphone developed by Meizu, serving as the successor to the Meizu M6 Note. It was unveiled on October 25, 2018.

== Design ==
The screen display is made of glass and it has an aluminum back frame.

At the bottom, there's a microUSB connector, a speaker, a microphone, and a 3.5 mm audio jack. On the left side of the smartphone, there's a slot for 2 SIM cards. The fingerprint scanner is displayed on the rear frame in the middle. The flashlight is displayed above the camera module.

The Note 8 was available in 4 color options: Black, Blue, Red, and Pink.

== Technical specifications ==
=== Platform ===
The smartphone features a Qualcomm Snapdragon 632 central processor and an Adreno 502 GPU.

=== Battery ===
The battery has a capacity of 3600 mAh and supports 24 W mCharge 4 fast charging.

=== Camera ===
The smartphone is equipped with a dual main camera system: a 13 MP, f/1.9 (wide-angle) lens + a 5 MP, f/2.4 (depth sensor) lens, featuring Dual Pixel phase autofocus and 1080p@30fps video recording capabilities. The front camera is an 8 MP (wide-angle) lens with an f/2.0 aperture and supports 1080p@30fps video recording.

=== Display ===
The Note 8 features an IPS LCD display, sizing at 6.0'', 2160 × 1080 (FullHD+) with an 18:9 aspect ratio and a pixel density of 402 ppi.

=== Storage ===
The smartphone was only sold in 4/64 GB configuration.

=== Software ===
The smartphone was released with Flyme 7.1, based on Android 8.1 Oreo. While Android 10 was planned, the update was canceled due to a large number of bugs.

== See also ==
- Redmi 6A
- Huawei Y5 (2018)
- LG G7 ThinQ
