= Meizu V8 =

Android smartphone manufactured by Meizu

Meizu V8 (Meizu M8 lite on the global market) Meizu V8 Pro (Meizu M8 on the global market)
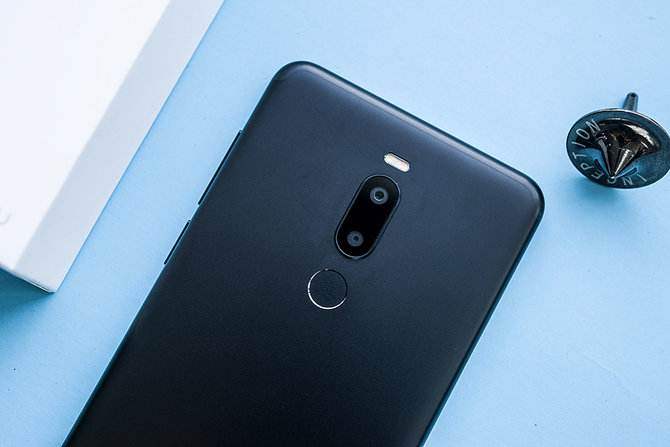
- Rear panel of the Meizu V8 Pro
- Manufacturer: Meizu
- Type: Smartphone
- Series: V/M
- First released: September 19, 2018; 7 years ago
- Predecessor: Meizu M6
- Successor: Meizu M10
- Related: Meizu M8c; Meizu Note 8
- Compatible networks: GSM, 3G, LTE (4G)
- Form factor: Slate
- Colors: V8: black, white V8 Pro: black, gold
- Dimensions: V8: 148 × 73 × 8.4 mm V8 Pro: 147.5 × 72.7 × 8.1 mm
- Weight: V8: 145 g V8 Pro: 159 g
- Operating system: Android 8.0 Oreo with Flyme 7.1
- System-on-chip: V8: MediaTek MT6739 (28 nm); V8 Pro: MediaTek MT6762 Helio P22 (12 nm)
- CPU: V8: 4×1.5 GHz Cortex-A53; V8 Pro: 8×2 GHz Cortex-A53
- GPU: V8: PowerVR GE8100; V8 Pro: PowerVR GE8320
- Memory: V8: 3 GB; V8 Pro: 4 GB; LPDDR3
- Storage: V8: 32 GB; V8 Pro: 64 GB eMMC 5.1
- Removable storage: MicroSDXC up to 128 GB
- SIM: Dual SIM (Nano-SIM)
- Battery: Both models: non-removable, Li-Ion; V8: 3200 mAh; V8 Pro: 3100 mAh
- Charging: 10 W
- Rear camera: V8: 13 MP, f/2.2 (wide), AF; V8 Pro: 12 MP, f/2.2 (wide), AF + 5 MP, f/2.2 (depth); Dual-LED dual-tone flash, panorama Video: 1080p@30fps
- Front camera: 5 MP, f/1.9 (wide); Video: 1080p@30fps
- Display: IPS LCD, 5.7", 1440 × 720 (HD+), 18:9 ratio, 282 ppi
- Sound: Mono speaker
- Connectivity: microUSB 2.0, 3.5 mm jack, Bluetooth 4.2 (V8) / 5.0 (V8 Pro) (A2DP, LE), Wi-Fi 802.11 a (V8 Pro)/b/g/n (dual-band (V8 Pro), Wi-Fi Direct), GPS, A-GPS, GLONASS
- Data inputs: Fingerprint scanner (rear-mounted), accelerometer, gyroscope, proximity, compass
- Model: V8: M816Q; M8 lite: M816H; V8 Pro: M813Q; M8: M813H
- Codename: V8: m1816 V8 Pro: m1813
- Made in: China

The Meizu V8 and Meizu V8 Pro are smartphones developed by Meizu. They were introduced on September 19, 2018, alongside the Meizu 16X. On the global market, they were sold under the names Meizu M8 lite and Meizu M8 respectively.

== Design ==
The screen is made of glass. The body of the Meizu V8 in black is made of matte plastic, and in white it is made of glossy plastic, while the V8 Pro body is constructed from aluminium.

The bottom features a micro-USB 2.0 port, loudspeaker, microphone, and a 3.5 mm jack. The left side houses a hybrid slot for 2 SIM cards, or 1 SIM card and a microSD memory card up to 128 GB. The right side contains the volume rocker and the power button. The fingerprint scanner is located on the back panel.

== Specifications ==
=== Hardware ===
The Meizu V8 is powered by a MediaTek MT6739 processor and a PowerVR GE8100 GPU. The Meizu V8 Pro features a MediaTek MT6762 Helio P22 processor and a PowerVR GE8320 GPU.

The Meizu V8 has a 3200 mAh battery, while the Meizu V8 Pro features a 3100 mAh battery. Both models feature 10 W charging.

=== Display ===
The devices feature a 5.7-inch IPS LCD display with a resolution of 1440 × 720 pixels (HD+), an 18:9 aspect ratio, and a pixel density of 282 ppi.

=== Cameras ===
The Meizu V8 features a 13 MP main camera with an f/2.2 aperture and autofocus. The Meizu V8 Pro upgraded to a dual rear camera system; a 12 MP main wide lens with autofocus and a 5 MP depth sensor, both featuring an f/2.2 aperture. Both models possess a 5 MP front-facing wide camera with an f/1.9 aperture. Both front and rear cameras can record video at 1080p@30fps.

=== Memory ===
The Meizu V8 was sold in a 3/32 GB configuration, while the V8 Pro came with 4/64 GB of internal storage. Both use LPDDR3 RAM and eMMC 5.1 storage layout.

=== Software ===
The smartphones launched with Flyme 7.1 overlay, which is based on the Android 8.1 Oreo operating system.

== See also ==
- Meizu
