= HD ready =

European certification label

HD ready logo for devices that are not 1080p

HD ready is a certification program introduced in 2005 by EICTA (European Information, Communications and Consumer Electronics Technology Industry Associations), now DIGITALEUROPE. HD ready minimum native resolution is 720 rows in widescreen ratio.

There are four different labels: "HD ready", "HD TV", "HD ready 1080p", "HD TV 1080p". The logos are assigned to television equipment capable of certain features.

In the United States, a similar "HD Ready" term usually refers to any display that is capable of accepting and displaying a high-definition signal at either 720p, 1080i or 1080p using a component video or digital input, but does not have a built-in HD-capable tuner.

== History ==
The "HD ready" certification program was introduced on January 19, 2005. The labels and relevant specifications are based on agreements between over 60 broadcasters and manufacturers of the European HDTV Forum at its second session in June 2004, held at the Betzdorf, Luxembourg headquarters of founding member SES Astra.

The "HD ready" logo is used on television equipment capable of displaying High Definition (HD) pictures from an external source. However, it does not have to feature a digital tuner to decode an HD signal; devices with tuners were certified under a separate "HD TV" logo, which does not require a "HD ready" display device.

Before the introduction of the "HD ready" certification, many TV sources and displays were being promoted as capable of displaying high definition pictures when they were in fact SDTV devices; according to Alexander Oudendijk, senior VP of marketing for Astra, in early 2005 there were 74 different devices being sold as ready for HD that were not. Devices advertised as HD-compatible or HD ready could take HDTV-signal as an input (via analog -YPbPr or digital DVI or HDMI), but they did not have enough pixels for true representation of even the lower HD resolution (1280 × 720) (plasma-based sets with 853 × 480 resolution, CRT based sets only capable of SDTV-resolution or VGA-resolution, 640×480 pixels), much less the higher HD resolution (1920 × 1080), and so were unable to display the HD picture without downscaling to a lower resolution. Industry-sponsored labels such as "Full HD" were misleading as well, as they can refer to devices which do not fulfil some essential requirements such as having 1:1 pixel mapping with no overscan or accepting a 1080p signal.

A UK BBC television programme found that separate labels for display devices and TV tuners/decoders confused purchasers, many of whom bought HD-ready equipment expecting to be able to receive HD with no additional equipment; they were sometimes actively misled by salespeople—a 2007 Ofcom survey found that 12% were told explicitly that they could view analog SDTV transmissions in HD, 7% that no extra equipment was needed, and 14% that HD-ready sets would receive existing digital SDTV transmissions in HD.

On August 30, 2007, 1080p versions of the logos and licensing agreements were introduced; as an improvement to the earlier scheme, "HD TV 1080p" logo now requires "HD ready 1080p" certification.

== Requirements and logos ==
Current logo for 1080p displays

Logo for 720p televisions and set-top boxes

HD ready and HD ready 1080p logos are assigned to displays (including integrated television sets, computer monitors and projectors) which have certain capabilities to process and display high-definition source video signal, outlined in a table below.

The HD TV logo is assigned to either integrated digital television sets (containing a display conforming to "HD ready" requirements) or standalone set-top boxes which are capable of receiving, decoding and outputting or displaying high-definition broadcasts (that is, include a DVB tuner for cable, terrestrial or satellite broadcasting, a video decoder which supports H.264/MPEG-4 AVC compression in 720p and 1080i signal formats, and either video outputs or an integrated display capable of handling such signals).

The HD TV 1080p logo is assigned to integrated digital television sets which have a display conforming to "HD ready 1080p" requirements, a DVB tuner and a decoder capable of processing 1080p signal.

In order to be labelled "HD ready 1080p" or "HD Ready" logo, a display device has to meet the following requirements:

Requirements	HD ready	HD ready 1080p
Minimum native resolution	720 horizontal lines (rows) in widescreen ratio	1920×1080
Analogue YPbPr HD input	Yes	Yes
Digital HDMI or DVI HD input	Yes	Yes
The HDMI or DVI input supports copy protection (HDCP)	Yes	Yes
720p HD (1280×720 progressive @50 & 60 Hz)	Yes	Yes
1080i HD (1920×1080 interlaced @50 & 60 Hz)	Yes	Yes
1080p HD (1920×1080 progressive @24, 50 & 60 Hz)	No	Yes
Accepted video formats are reproduced without distortion	No	Yes
Display 1080p and 1080i video without overscan (1:1 pixel mapping)	No	Yes
Display native video modes at the same, or higher, refresh rate	No	Yes
