= Fixed-pixel display =

Display technologies with an invariable matrix of pixels

Fixed vs. CRT pixels

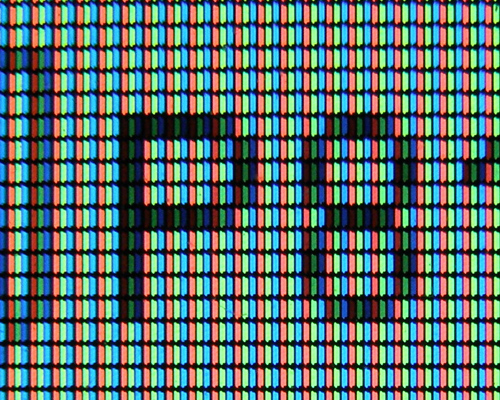
Closeup of a fixed pixel display: pixels consist of 3 colored subpixels, and are arranged in a matrix, aligned both horizontally and vertically.

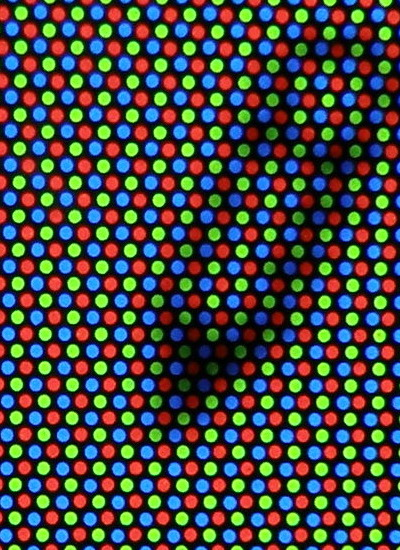
A CRT monitor that has no clear distinction of individual pixels; the image is formed based on the resolution set by the electron gun. The brightness of the image can vary within each phosphor dot.

Fixed-pixel displays are display technologies such as LCD and plasma that use an unfluctuating matrix of pixels with a set number of pixels in each row and column. With such displays, adjusting (scaling) to different aspect ratios because of different input signals requires complex processing.

In contrast, CRT-based displays "paint" the screen with the required number of pixels horizontally and vertically. CRTs can be designed to more easily accommodate a wide range of inputs (VGA, XVGA, NTSC, HDTV, etc.). Despite the phosphor dots on a color CRT superficially resembling pixels, they are not: the electron guns in the CRT do not control phosphor dots individually, and the brightness of an image can change within a dot.
