= Meizu MX4 =

Phone

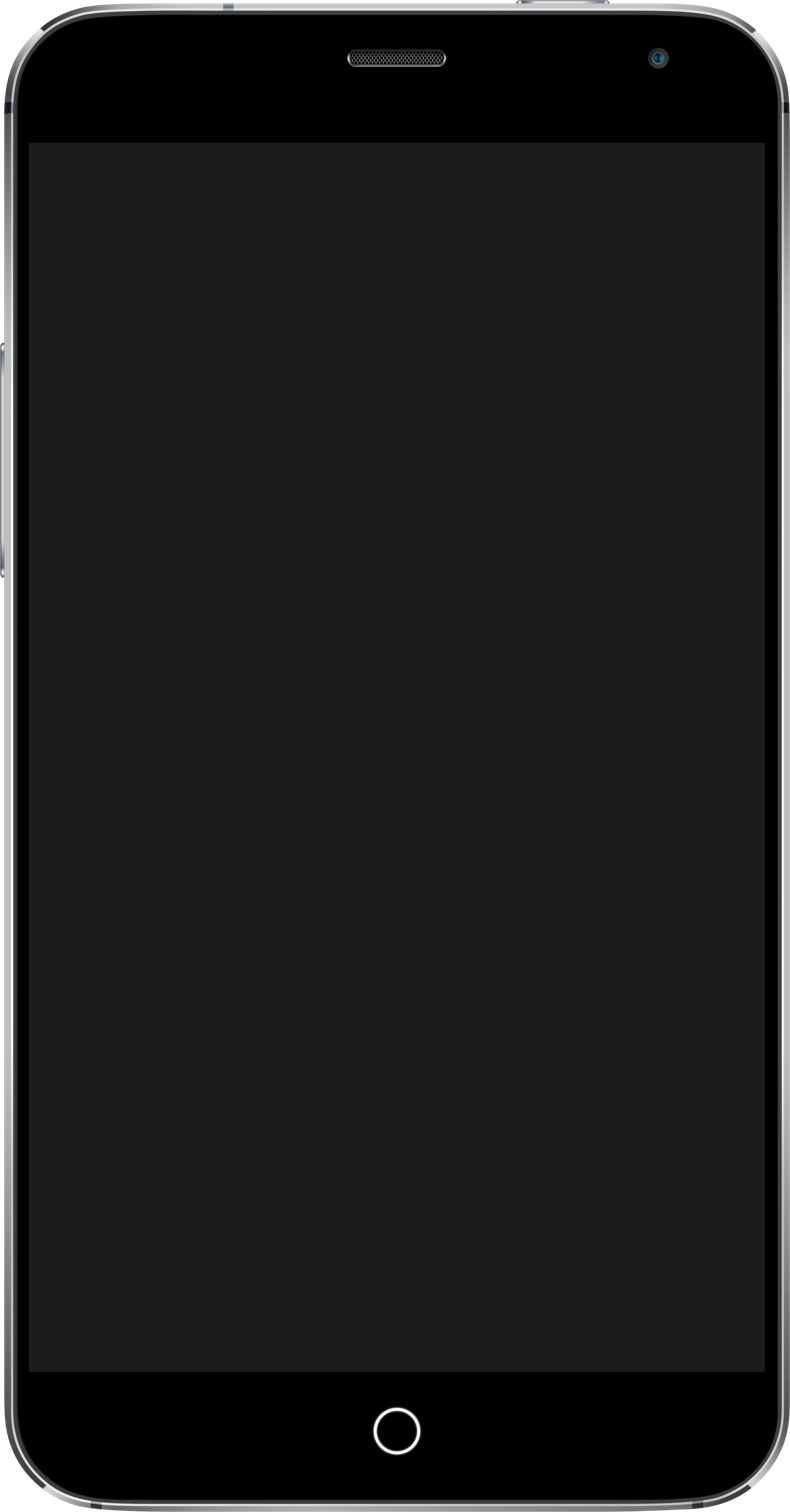
- Manufacturer: Meizu
- Type: Touchscreen smartphone
- Series: Meizu MX Series
- First released: September 2, 2014; 12 years ago
- Predecessor: Meizu MX3
- Successor: Meizu MX5
- Compatible networks: GSM, UMTS, HSPA, LTE
- Dimensions: 144.0 mm (5.67 in) H 75.2 mm (2.96 in) W 8.9 mm (0.35 in) D
- Weight: 147 g (5.2 oz)
- Operating system: Flyme OS, based on Android 4.4.2 KitKat
- System-on-chip: MediaTek MT6595
- CPU: Octa-core (4x2.2GHz Cortex-A17 4x1.7GHz Cortex-A7)
- GPU: PowerVR G6200
- Memory: 2 GB LPDDR3
- Storage: 16 GB, 32 GB or 64 GB flash memory
- Removable storage: Not supported
- Battery: 3100 mAh Li-Ion rechargeable battery, not replaceable
- Rear camera: 20.7 MP, PDAF autofocus, ƒ/2.2 aperture, LED flash, 4K recording
- Front camera: 2.0 MP, ƒ/2.0 aperture
- Display: 5.36 inch diagonal OGS; 1152x1920 px (418 ppi)
- Connectivity: 3.5 mm TRS connector, Bluetooth 4.0 with BLE, Dual-band WiFi (802.11 a/b/g/n/ac)
- Data inputs: Multi-touch capacitive touchscreen, A-GPS, GLONASS, Accelerometer, Gyroscope, Proximity sensor, Digital compass, Ambient light sensor
- Other: Dual SIM support with dual standby mode

The Meizu MX4 is a smartphone designed and produced by the Chinese manufacturer Meizu, which runs on Flyme OS, Meizu's modified Android operating system. It is a previous phablet model of the MX series, succeeding the Meizu MX3 and preceding the Meizu MX5. It was unveiled on September 2, 2014 in Beijing.

== History ==
Rumors appeared in April 2014, which stated that a successor of the Meizu MX3 was about to be released in August.

Meizu later confirmed that the launch event in Beijing was scheduled for September 2, 2014.

At the Mobile World Congress in March 2015, Meizu has presented the Meizu MX4 Ubuntu Edition, which is an alternative version of the MX4 running on Ubuntu Touch, becoming the second commercially available device on this platform.

As announced, the MX4 was released in Beijing on September 2, 2014. The MX4 was introduced to the Indian market on May 18, 2015.

== Features ==
=== Flyme ===
The Meizu MX4 was released with an updated version of Flyme OS, a modified operating system based on Android KitKat. It features an alternative, flat design and improved one-handed usability.

=== Hardware and design ===
The Meizu MX4 features a MediaTek MT6595 system-on-a-chip with an array of four ARM Cortex-A17 and four Cortex-A7 CPU cores, a PowerVR G6200 GPU and 2 GB of RAM. The MX4 reaches a score of 50,987 points on the AnTuTu benchmark and is therefore almost 106% faster than its predecessor, the Meizu MX3.

The MX4 is available in four different color variants (grey body with black front, champagne gold body with white front and white body with black or white front) and comes with 16 GB, 32 GB or 64 GB of internal storage.

The body of the MX4 features a metal frame and measures 144.0 mm (5.67 in) x 75.2 mm (2.96 in) x 8.9 mm (0.35 in) and weighs 147 g (5.2 oz). It has a slate form factor, being rectangular with rounded corners. The MX4 uses a single circular halo button on the front for navigation.

The MX4 features a 5.36-inch IPS multi-touch capacitive touchscreen display with a FHD resolution of 1152 by 1920 pixels. The pixel density of the display is 403 ppi.

In addition to the touchscreen input and the front key, the device has volume/zoom control buttons and the power/lock button on the right side, a 3.5mm TRS audio jack on the top and a microUSB (Micro-B type) port on the bottom for charging and connectivity.

The Meizu MX4 has two cameras. The rear camera has a resolution of 20.7 MP, a ƒ/2.2 aperture, a 5-element lens, laser-aided phase-detection autofocus and an LED flash. The front camera has a resolution of 2 MP, a ƒ/2.0 aperture and a 4-element lens.

== Reception ==
The MX4 received generally positive reviews.

Android Authority gave the MX4 a rating of 7.0 out of 10 possible points and mentioned that the device has "[a] great screen, super powerful processor and awesome build quality".

PhoneArena stated that "the Meizu MX4 is a great flagship for those of you on a smaller budget".

Android Headlines also reviewed the device and concluded that "[all] in all this is easily one of the best phones of the year". Furthermore, Android Headlines praised the display, build quality and camera.

== See also ==
- Meizu
- Meizu MX3
- Meizu MX4 Ubuntu Edition
- Meizu MX4 Pro
- Meizu MX5
