= Meizu MX4 Ubuntu Edition =

Smartphone

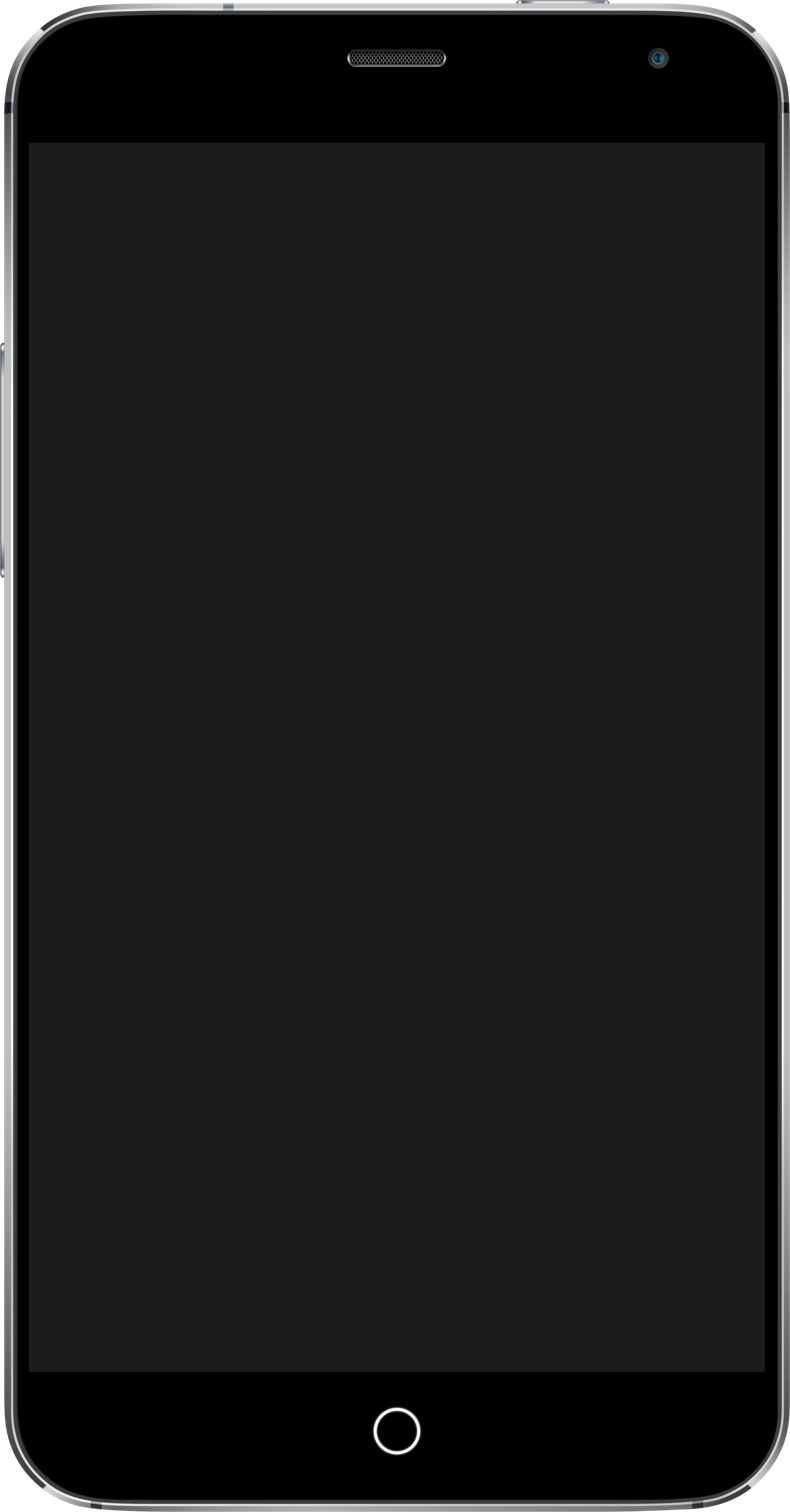
- Manufacturer: Meizu
- Type: Touchscreen smartphone
- Series: Meizu MX Series
- First released: June 25, 2015; 11 years ago
- Compatible networks: GSM, UMTS, HSPA, LTE
- Dimensions: 144.0 mm (5.67 in) H 75.2 mm (2.96 in) W 8.9 mm (0.35 in) D
- Weight: 147 g (5.2 oz)
- Operating system: Ubuntu Touch
- System-on-chip: MediaTek MT6595
- CPU: Octa-core (4x2.2GHz Cortex-A17 4x1.7GHz Cortex-A7)
- GPU: PowerVR G6200
- Memory: 2 GB LPDDR3
- Storage: 16 GB flash memory
- Removable storage: Not supported
- Battery: 3100 mAh Li-Ion rechargeable battery, not replaceable
- Rear camera: 20.7 MP, PDAF autofocus, ƒ/2.2 aperture, LED flash, 4K recording
- Front camera: 2.0 MP, ƒ/2.0 aperture
- Display: 5.36 inch diagonal OGS; 1152x1920 px (418 ppi)
- Connectivity: 3.5 mm TRS connector, Bluetooth 4.0 with BLE, Dual-band WiFi (802.11 a/b/g/n/ac)
- Data inputs: Multi-touch capacitive touchscreen, A-GPS, GLONASS, Accelerometer, Gyroscope, Proximity sensor, Digital compass, Ambient light sensor
- Other: Dual SIM support with dual standby mode

The Meizu MX4 Ubuntu Edition is a smartphone designed and produced by the Chinese manufacturer Meizu, which runs on Ubuntu Touch. It is a previous phablet model of the MX series, representing an alternative edition of the MX4. It is Meizu's first commercially available Ubuntu Touch device and the second commercially available phone with Ubuntu Touch overall. It was unveiled at the Mobile World Congress in March 2015.

== History ==
In November 2014, Meizu and Canonical signed a cooperation agreement, which set the starting point for Meizu to release devices running on Ubuntu Touch.

In February 2015, Meizu confirmed that there will be an Ubuntu Touch-based version of the Meizu MX4 and that it will be showcased at Mobile World Congress 2015.

At the Mobile World Congress in March 2015, Meizu has presented the Meizu MX4 Ubuntu Edition, which is an alternative version of the MX4 running on Ubuntu Touch, becoming the second commercially available device on this platform.

=== Release ===
The Meizu MX4 Ubuntu Edition was released through an invite-only system on the European market on June 25, 2015.

== Features ==
=== Ubuntu Touch ===
The MX4 Ubuntu Edition is running Ubuntu Touch, which is a mobile operating system based on the Ubuntu linux distribution developed by Canonical. Its goal is to provide a free and open-source mobile operating system and deliver a different approach to user experience by focusing on so-called “scopes” instead of traditional apps.

=== Hardware and design ===
The technical specifications and outer appearance of the MX4 Ubuntu Edition is identical with the Meizu MX4. The Meizu MX4 Ubuntu Edition features a MediaTek MT6595 system-on-a-chip with an array of four ARM Cortex-A17 and four Cortex-A7 CPU cores, a PowerVR G6200 GPU and 3 GB of RAM.

The MX4 Ubuntu Edition is only available in with 16 GB of internal storage and with a champagne gold body.

The body of the MX4 Ubuntu Edition features a metal frame and measures 144.0 mm (5.67 in) x 75.2 mm (2.96 in) x 8.9 mm (0.35 in) and weighs 147 g (5.2 oz). It has a slate form factor, being rectangular with rounded corners.

The MX4 Ubuntu Edition features a 5.36-inch AMOLED multi-touch capacitive touchscreen display with a FHD resolution of 1152 by 1920 pixels. The pixel density of the display is 403 ppi.

In addition to the touchscreen input and the front key, the device has volume/zoom control buttons and the power/lock button on the right side, a 3.5mm TRS audio jack on the top and a microUSB (Micro-B type) port on the bottom for charging and connectivity.

The Meizu MX4 Ubuntu Edition has two cameras. The rear camera has a resolution of 20.7 MP, a ƒ/2.2 aperture, a 5-element lens, laser-aided phase-detection autofocus and an LED flash. The front camera has a resolution of 2 MP, a ƒ/2.0 aperture and a 4-element lens.

== Reception ==
The MX4 Ubuntu Edition received generally positive reviews.

ZDNet gave the MX4 a rating of 8.0 out of 10 possible points and mentioned that "the Meizu MX4 Ubuntu Edition offers a number of high-end hardware features at relatively low cost".

TechRadar stated that "Ubuntu Phone has plenty of potential" and praised the build quality, design and powerful specifications of the device.

== See also ==
- Meizu
- Meizu MX4
- Meizu PRO 5 Ubuntu Edition
