= Meizu MX4 Pro =

Android smartphone

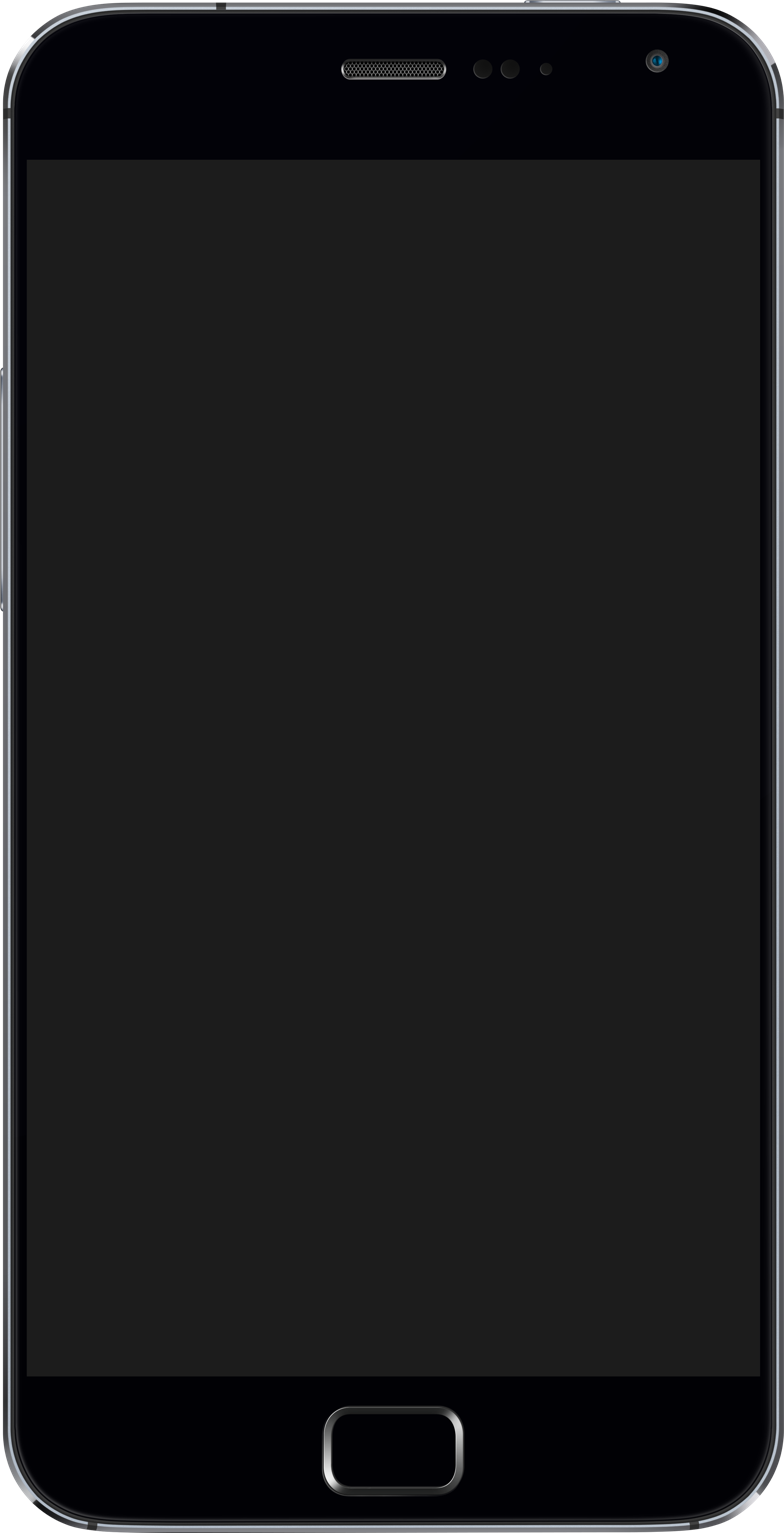
- Manufacturer: Meizu
- Type: Touchscreen smartphone
- Series: Meizu MX Series
- First released: 19 November 2014; 11 years ago
- Successor: Meizu PRO 5
- Related: Meizu MX4
- Compatible networks: GSM, UMTS, HSPA, LTE
- Dimensions: 150.1 mm (5.91 in) H 77.0 mm (3.03 in) W 9.0 mm (0.35 in) D
- Weight: 158 g (5.6 oz)
- Operating system: Flyme OS, based on Android 4.4 KitKat
- System-on-chip: Samsung Exynos 5430
- CPU: Octa-core (4x2.0 GHz Cortex-A15 & 4x1.5 GHz Cortex-A7)
- GPU: Mali-T628 MP6
- Memory: 3 GB LPDDR3
- Storage: 16 GB, 32 GB or 64 GB flash memory
- Removable storage: Not supported
- Battery: 3350 mAh Li-Ion rechargeable battery, not replaceable
- Rear camera: 20.7 MP, autofocus, ƒ/2.2 aperture, LED flash, 4K recording
- Front camera: 5.0 MP, ƒ/2.0 aperture
- Display: 5.5 inch diagonal JDI; 1536x2560 px (546 ppi)
- Connectivity: 3.5 mm TRS connector, Bluetooth 4.0 with BLE, Dual-band WiFi (802.11 a/b/g/n/ac)
- Data inputs: Multi-touch capacitive touchscreen, A-GPS, GLONASS, Accelerometer, Gyroscope, Proximity sensor, Digital compass, Ambient light sensor
- Other: Dual SIM support with dual standby mode

The Meizu MX4 Pro is a smartphone designed and produced by the Chinese manufacturer Meizu, which runs on Flyme OS, Meizu's modified Android operating system. It is a previous phablet model of the MX series, representing a more powerful version of the Meizu MX4. It was unveiled on 19 November 2014 in Beijing.

== History ==
Before the launch of the Meizu MX4, there was speculation that it would feature two different versions. Leaked information confirmed the rumors and suggested that the extended version would be called the MX4 Pro.

In October 2014, Meizu VP Li Nan confirmed on social media that Meizu would launch the Meizu MX4 Pro in November. This post also confirmed earlier speculations that the device would feature a 2K resolution screen.

On 31 October 2014, it was reported that the upcoming Meizu device was certified by the Chinese telecommunication authority TENAA, equivalent to the American Federal Communications Commission. According to the certification, the device would have a battery with a capacity of 3100 mAh. Furthermore, it reconfirmed that the display would support 2K resolution.

The launch event for the new device was officially scheduled for 19 November 2014 in Beijing.

=== Release ===
As announced at the launch, the MX4 Pro was released for purchase on 6 December 2014. Pre-order for the device began after the launch event and more than 6.7 million devices had been pre-ordered within two weeks after the launch.

== Features ==
=== Flyme ===
The Meizu MX4 Pro was released with an updated version of Flyme OS, a modified operating system based on Android KitKat. It features an alternative, flat design and improved one-handed usability.

=== Hardware and design ===
The Meizu MX4 Pro features a Samsung Exynos 5430 system-on-a-chip with an array of four ARM Cortex-A15 and four Cortex-A7 CPU cores, a Mali-T628 MP6 and 3 GB of RAM. The MX4 Pro reaches a score of 54,863 points on the AnTuTu benchmark and is therefore approximately 8% faster than the Meizu MX4.

The MX4 Pro is available in four different color variants (grey body with black front, champagne gold body with white front and white body with black or white front) and comes with 16 GB, 32 GB or 64 GB of internal storage.

The Meizu MX4 Pro is slightly bigger and heavier with measures of 149.9 mm (5.90 in) x 74.7 mm (2.94 in) x 7.6 mm (0.30 in) and a weight of 149 g (5.3 oz). It has a slate form factor, being rectangular with rounded corners and has only one central physical button at the front.

Unlike most other Android smartphones, the MX4 Pro doesn't have capacitive buttons nor on-screen buttons. The functionality of these keys is implemented using a technology called mBack, which makes use of gestures with the physical button. The MX4 Pro further extends this button by a fingerprint sensor called mTouch. The MX4 Pro was the first Meizu phone to implement these two technologies.

The MX4 Pro features a 5.5-inch multi-touch capacitive touchscreen display with a 2K resolution of 1536 by 2560 pixels. The pixel density of the display is 546 ppi.

In addition to the touchscreen input and the front key, the device has volume/zoom control buttons and the power/lock button on the right side, a 3.5mm TRS audio jack on the top and a microUSB (Micro-B type) port on the bottom for charging and connectivity.

The Meizu MX4 Pro has two cameras. The rear camera has a resolution of 20.7 MP, a ƒ/2.2 aperture, a 5-element lens and an LED flash. The front camera has a resolution of 5 MP, a ƒ/2.0 aperture and a 4-element lens.

== Reception ==
The MX4 Pro received positive reviews.

Android Authority gave the MX4 Pro a rating of 8.5 out of 10 possible points and praised "QuadHD display, good performance, an enjoyable sound stage, and an above average camera".

Android Headlines also reviewed the device and concluded that "build quality is excellent, software is well polished and exudes a unique style that feels very Meizu, and overall the MX4 Pro is one of the favorite phones of the year". Furthermore, Android Headlines praised the responsive OS and wide variety of camera options.

PhoneArena gave the MX4 Pro an overall rating of 9 out of 10 possible points and praised the high performance and excellent audio quality.

== See also ==
- Meizu MX5
