= Meizu MX3 =

Smartphone

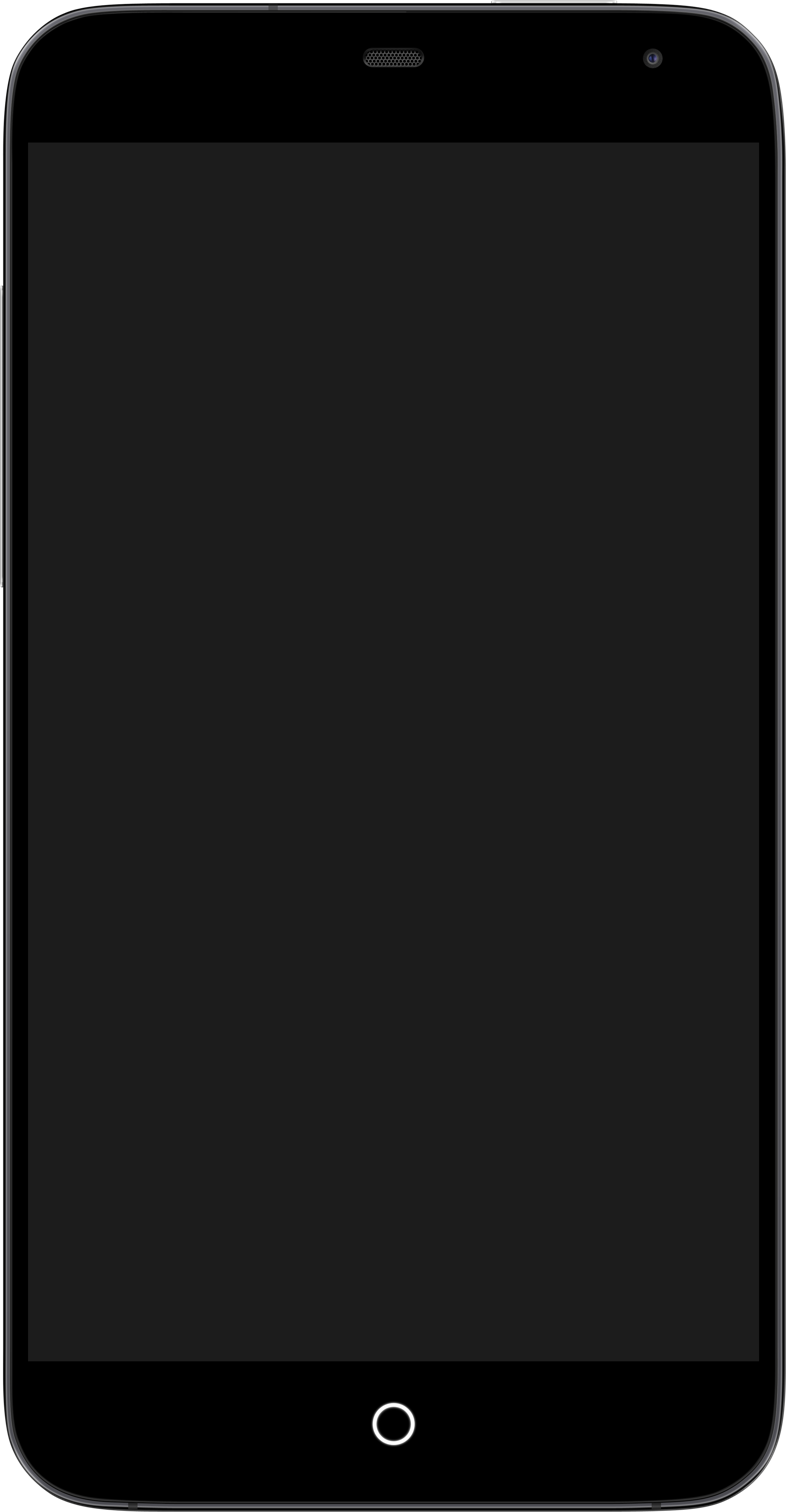
- Manufacturer: Meizu
- Type: Touchscreen smartphone
- Series: Meizu MX Series
- First released: September 2, 2013; 12 years ago
- Predecessor: Meizu MX2
- Successor: Meizu MX4
- Compatible networks: GSM, UMTS, HSPA
- Dimensions: 139.0 mm (5.47 in) H 71.9 mm (2.83 in) W 9.1 mm (0.36 in) D
- Weight: 149 g (5.3 oz)
- Operating system: Flyme OS, based on Android 4.2 Jelly Bean
- System-on-chip: Samsung Exynos 5410 Octa
- CPU: Quad-core (4x1.6 GHz Cortex-A15 & 4x1.2 GHz Cortex-A7)
- GPU: SGX 544MP3
- Memory: 2 GB LPDDR3
- Storage: 16 GB, 32 GB, 64 GB or 128 GB flash memory
- Removable storage: Not supported
- Battery: 2400 mAh Li-Ion rechargeable battery, not replaceable
- Rear camera: 8 MP, PDAF autofocus, ƒ/2.0 aperture, LED flash, 1080p30 recording
- Front camera: 2.0 MP, ƒ/2.0 aperture, 1080p30 recording
- Display: 5.1 inch diagonal OGS; 1080x1800 px (418 ppi)
- Connectivity: 3.5 mm TRS connector, Bluetooth 4.0, Dual-band WiFi (802.11 a/b/g/n
- Data inputs: Multi-touch capacitive touchscreen, A-GPS, GLONASS, Accelerometer, Gyroscope, Proximity sensor, Digital compass, Ambient light sensor

The Meizu MX3 is a smartphone designed and produced by the Chinese manufacturer Meizu, which runs on Flyme OS, Meizu's modified Android operating system. It is a previous phablet model of the MX series, succeeding the Meizu MX2 and preceding the Meizu MX4. It was the first smartphone with 128 GB of internal storage. It was unveiled on September 2, 2013, in Beijing.

== History ==
Rumors about Meizu releasing a new flagship device appeared after renders of the upcoming device had been leaked. According to these leaks, the MX3 was supposed to have a single circular “Home” key for navigation and a Full HD 5.1-inch display.

In August 2013, Meizu has sent out invitations for a launch event on September 2, 2013, in Beijing.

=== Release ===
As announced, the Meizu MX3 was released at the launch event in Beijing on September 2, 2013.

== Features ==
=== Flyme ===
The Meizu MX3 was released with an updated version of Flyme OS, a modified operating system based on Android Jelly Bean. It features an alternative, flat design and improved one-handed usability.

=== Hardware and design ===
The Meizu MX3 features a Samsung Exynos 5410 Octa system-on-a-chip with an array of four ARM Cortex-A15 and four Cortex-A7 CPU cores, a PowerVR SGX544MP3 GPU and 2 GB of RAM. The MX3 reaches a score of 24,780 points on the AnTuTu benchmark and is therefore almost 104% faster than its predecessor, the Meizu MX2.

The MX3 is available in five different colors (white, blue, pink, orange and green) and comes with 16 GB, 32 GB, 64 GB or 128 GB of internal storage. It was the first smartphone to feature 128 GB of internal storage at the time of the release.

The body of the MX3 measures 139.0 mm (5.47 in) x 71.9 mm (2.83 in) x 9.1 mm (0.36 in) and weighs 149 g (5.3 oz). It has a slate form factor, being rectangular with rounded corners. The MX3 uses a single circular halo button on the front for navigation.

The MX3 features a 5.1-inch OGS multi-touch capacitive touchscreen display with a FHD resolution of 1080 by 1800 pixels. The pixel density of the display is 412 ppi.

In addition to the touchscreen input and the front key, the device has volume/zoom control buttons and the power/lock button on the right side, a 3.5mm TRS audio jack on the top and a microUSB (Micro-B type) port on the bottom for charging and connectivity.

The Meizu MX3 has two cameras. The rear camera has a resolution of 8 MP, a ƒ/2.0 aperture, autofocus and an LED flash. The front camera has a resolution of 2 MP, a ƒ/2.0 aperture and just like the rear camera it is also capable of recording video with a resolution of up to 1080p30.

== Reception ==
The MX3 received positive reviews.

Android Authority reviewed the MX3 and praised good specifications, sharp display and the attractive price.

GSMArena stated that "Meizu has delivered a solid smartphone and an interesting alternative to the mainstream Android flagships" and praised the performance of the MX3.

Android Headlines also reviewed the device and concluded that "if you're looking for a somewhat cheaper flagship device and you have a way to get one of these, consider it, because it really is worth taking a look." Furthermore, Android Headlines praised the sleek body and powerful specifications of the device.

== See also ==
- Meizu
- Meizu MX2
- Meizu MX4
