= Meizu PRO 5 =

Smartphone model

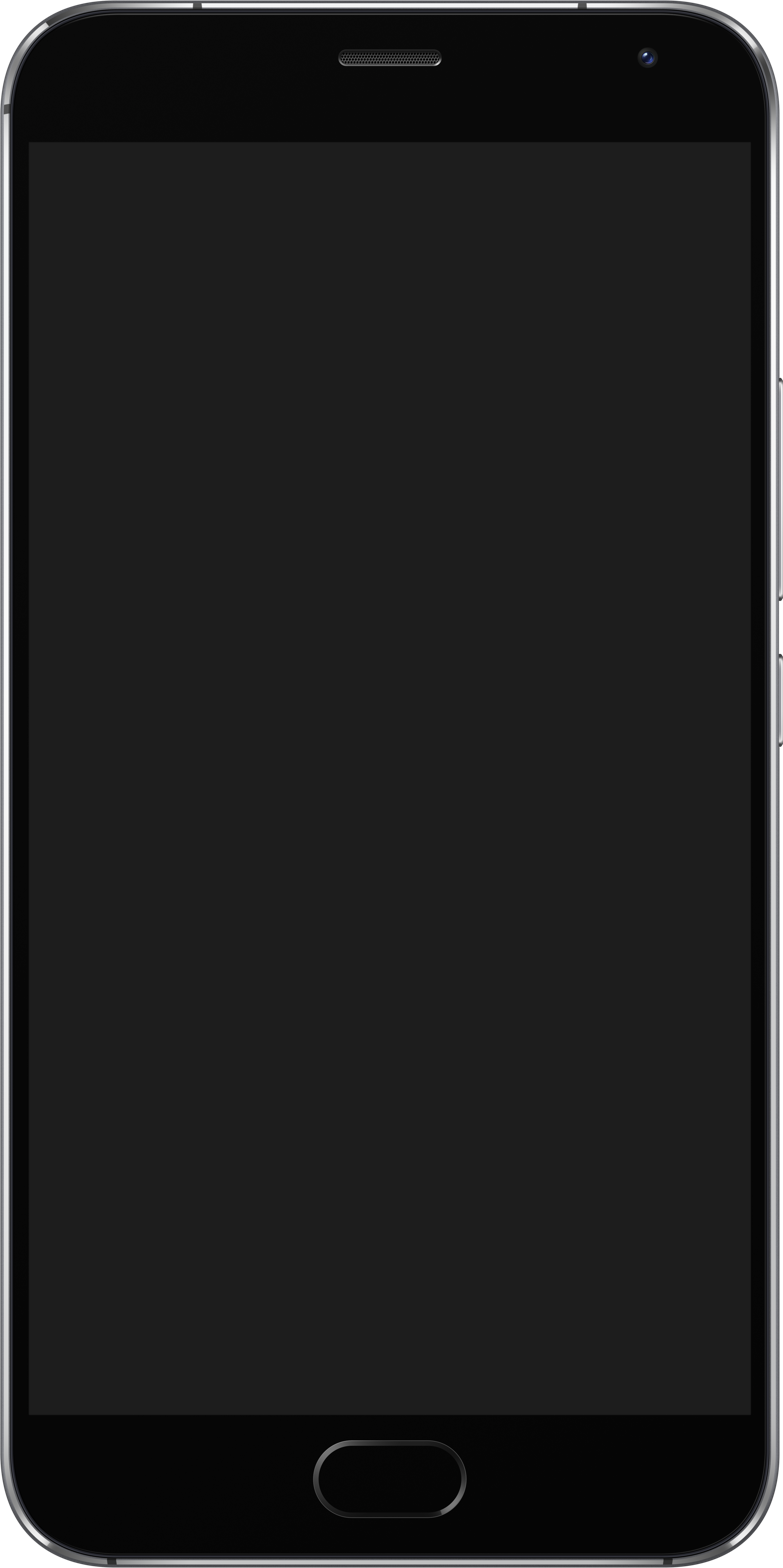
- Manufacturer: Meizu
- Type: Touchscreen smartphone
- Series: Meizu PRO Series
- First released: September 23, 2015; 10 years ago
- Predecessor: Meizu MX4 Pro
- Successor: Meizu PRO 6
- Related: Meizu PRO 5 Ubuntu Edition
- Compatible networks: GSM, UMTS, HSPA, LTE
- Dimensions: 156.7 mm (6.17 in) H 78.0 mm (3.07 in) W 7.5 mm (0.30 in) D
- Weight: 168 g (5.9 oz)
- Operating system: Flyme OS, based on Android 5.1 Lollipop
- System-on-chip: Samsung Exynos 7420 Octa
- CPU: 8-core (4x2.1 GHz Cortex-A57 & 4x1.5 GHz Cortex-A53)
- GPU: ARM Mali-T760 MP8
- Memory: 3 or 4 GB LPDDR3
- Storage: 32 or 64 GB flash memory
- Removable storage: Not supported
- Battery: 3050 mAh Li-Ion rechargeable battery, not replaceable
- Rear camera: 21.16 MP, PDAF laser autofocus, ƒ/2.2 aperture, LED flash, 4K video recording
- Front camera: 5.0 MP, ƒ/2.0 aperture
- Display: 5.7 inch diagonal AMOLED; 1080x1920 px (426.3 ppi)
- Connectivity: 3.5 mm TRS connector, Bluetooth 4.0 with BLE, Dual-band WiFi (802.11 a/b/g/n/ac), USB-C
- Data inputs: Multi-touch capacitive touchscreen, A-GPS, GLONASS, BDS, Accelerometer, Gyroscope, Proximity sensor, Digital compass, Ambient light sensor
- Other: Dual SIM support with dual standby mode, Hi-FI amplifier

The Meizu PRO 5 is a smartphone designed and produced by the Chinese manufacturer Meizu, which runs on Flyme OS, Meizu's modified Android operating system. It is the company's first model of the flagship PRO series. It was unveiled on September 23, 2015, in Beijing.

== History ==
First rumors about Meizu releasing a new flagship device featuring a Samsung Exynos SoC appeared in September 2015, after the device was listed on the AnTuTu benchmark, It was also mentioned that the upcoming flagship device would be called "Niux".

On September 9, 2015, Meizu officially announced that it would release a new flagship device on September 23, 2015.

On September 11, 2015, Meizu VP Li Nan announced that the name of the new flagship device will be PRO 5.

=== Release ===
Pre-orders for the PRO 5 began after the launch event on September 23, 2015. The release of the device was delayed until November due to flooding of the factory.

== Features ==
=== Flyme ===
The Meizu PRO 5 was released with an updated version of Flyme OS, a modified operating system based on Android Lollipop. It features an alternative, flat design and improved one-handed usability.

=== Hardware and design ===
The Meizu PRO 5 features a Samsung Exynos 7420 Octa with an array of eight ARM Cortex CPU cores, an ARM Mali-T760 MP8 GPU and 3 GB or 4 GB of RAM, which scores a result of 85,652 points on the AnTuTu benchmark. The PRO 5 was ranked first on the AnTuTu benchmark rating for Q3 2015. Meizu Global Brand Manager Ard Boudeling explained in November 2015 that Meizu decided to use the Samsung Exynos SoC because it is "currently [..] the only option if you want to build a genuine premium device".

The Meizu PRO 5 has a full-metal body, which measures 156.7 mm (6.17 in) x 78.0 mm (3.07 in) x 7.5 mm (0.30 in) and weighs 168 g (5.9 oz). It has a slate form factor, being rectangular with rounded corners and has only one central physical button at the front. Unlike most other Android smartphones, the PRO 5 doesn't have capacitive buttons nor on-screen buttons. The functionality of these keys is implemented using a technology called mBack, which makes use of gestures with the physical button. This button also includes a fingerprint sensor called mTouch.

The PRO 5 is available in four different color variants (grey body with black front, champagne gold body with white front and white body with black or white front) and comes with 32 GB or 64 GB of internal storage.

The PRO 5 features a 5.7-inch AMOLED multi-touch capacitive touchscreen display with a (FHD resolution of 1080 by 1920 pixels. The pixel density of the display is 387 ppi.

In addition to the touchscreen input and the front key, the device has a volume/zoom control and the power/lock button on the right side and a 3.5mm TRS audio jack, which is powered by a dedicated Hi-Fi amplifier supporting 32-bit audio with a frequency range of up to 192 kHz.

The PRO 5 uses a USB-C connector for both data connectivity and charging.

The Meizu PRO 5 has two cameras. The rear camera has a resolution of 21.16 MP, a ƒ/2.2 aperture and a 6-element lens. Furthermore, the phase-detection autofocus of the rear camera is laser-supported. The front camera has a resolution of 5 MP, a ƒ/2.0 aperture and a 5-element lens.

== Reception ==
The PRO 5 received mostly favorable reviews.

Android Authority gave an overall rating of 8.8 out of 10 points, concluding that the PRO 5 "is easily the best flagship Meizu has released to date [..] and should certainly not be overlooked".

Android Headlines noted that it "is significantly more affordable than other similarly specced offerings out there", concluding that the "Meizu PRO 5 is one of the best devices [..] reviewed to date".

== See also ==
- Meizu
- Meizu PRO 5 Ubuntu Edition
- Meizu PRO 6
