= Meizu PRO 6 =

Chinese smartphone unveiled in 2016

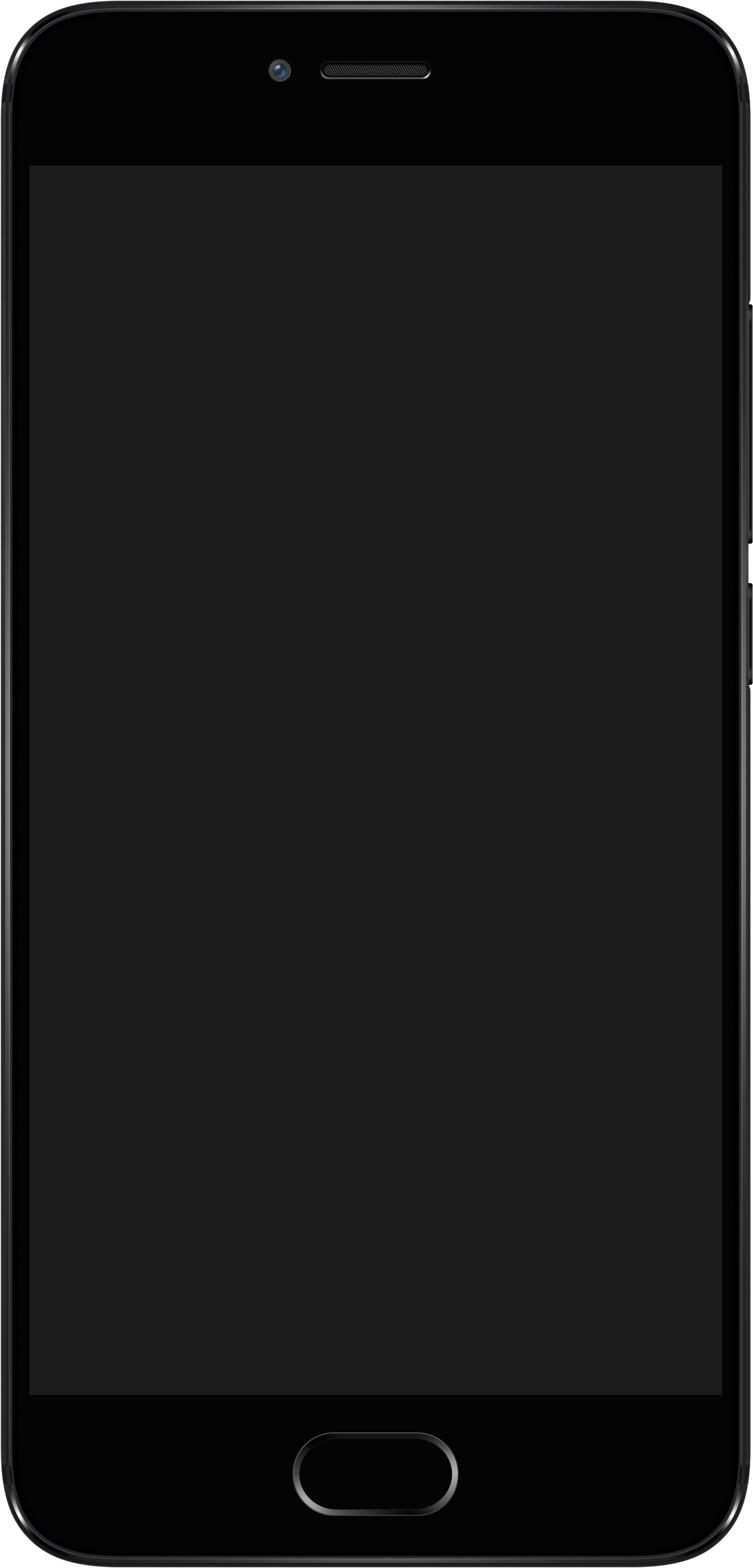
- Manufacturer: Meizu
- Type: Touchscreen smartphone
- Series: Meizu PRO Series
- First released: April 13, 2016; 10 years ago
- Predecessor: Meizu PRO 5
- Successor: Meizu PRO 7
- Compatible networks: GSM, UMTS, HSPA, LTE
- Dimensions: 147.7 mm (5.81 in) H 70.8 mm (2.79 in) W 7.25 mm (0.285 in) D
- Weight: 160 g (5.6 oz)
- Operating system: Flyme OS, based on Android 6.0 Marshmallow
- System-on-chip: MediaTek MT6797T Helio X25
- CPU: 10-core (2x2.5GHz Cortex-A72, 4x2.0GHz Cortex-A53, 4x1.4GHz Cortex-A53)
- GPU: ARM Mali-T880 MP4
- Memory: 4 GB LPDDR3
- Storage: 32 or 64 GB flash memory
- Removable storage: Not supported
- Battery: 2560 mAh Li-Ion rechargeable battery, not replaceable
- Rear camera: 21.16 MP, PDAF laser autofocus, ƒ/2.2 aperture, LED flash, 4K video recording
- Front camera: 5.0 MP, ƒ/2.0 aperture
- Display: 5.2 inch diagonal TDDI; 1080x1920 px (426.3 ppi)
- Connectivity: 3.5 mm TRS connector, Bluetooth 4.0 with BLE, Dual-band WiFi (802.11 a/b/g/n/ac), USB-C
- Data inputs: Multi-touch capacitive touchscreen, A-GPS, GLONASS, BDS, Accelerometer, Gyroscope, Proximity sensor, Digital compass, Ambient light sensor
- Other: Dual SIM support with dual standby mode, 3D Press force touch technology, Cirrus Logic CS43L36 Hi-FI amplifier

The Meizu PRO 6 is a smartphone designed and produced by the Chinese manufacturer Meizu, which runs on Flyme OS, Meizu's modified Android operating system. It is the company's latest model of the flagship PRO series, succeeding the Meizu PRO 5. It was unveiled on April 13, 2016, in Beijing.

== History ==
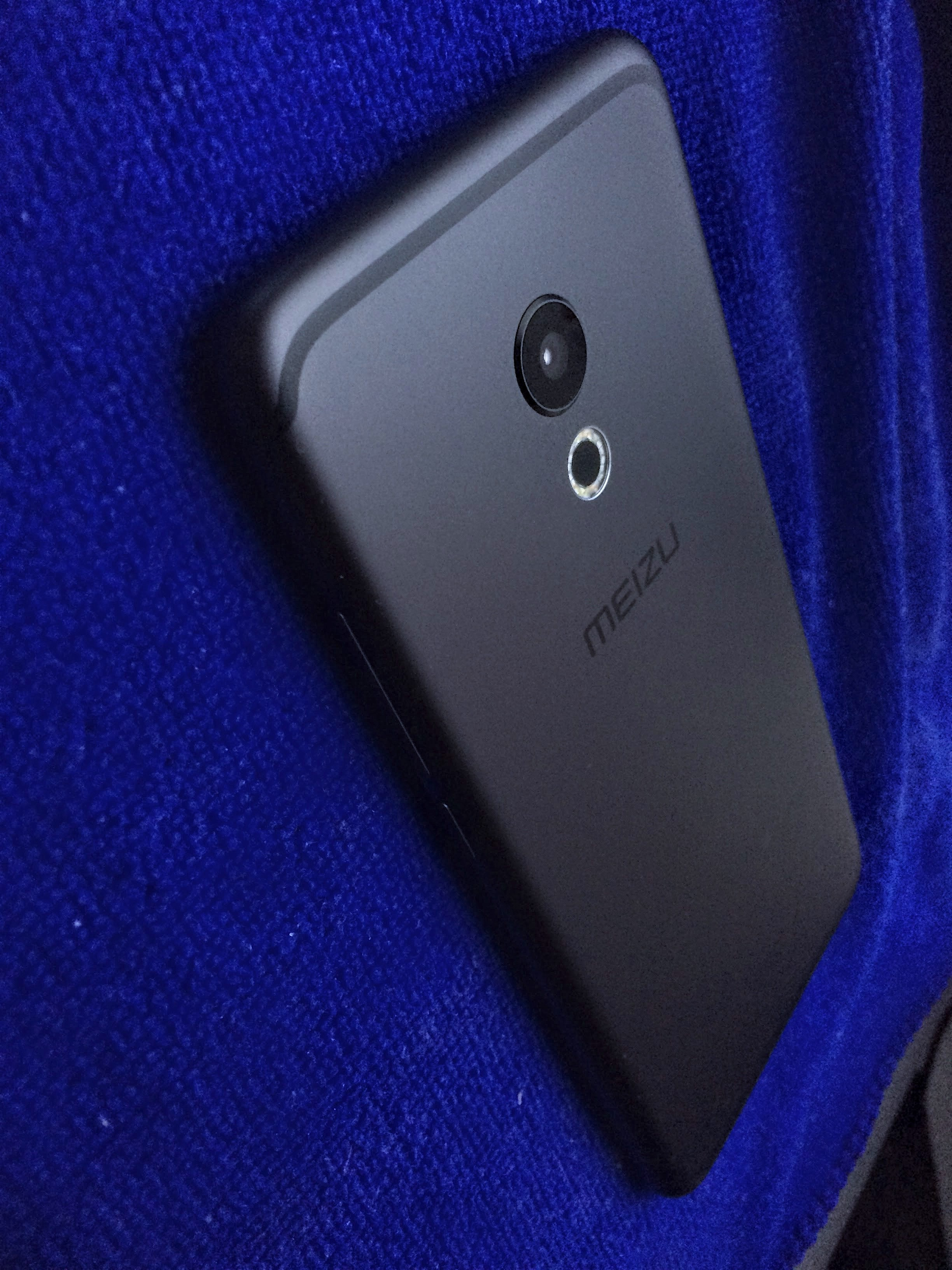
The Meizu Pro 6 in back

In March 2016, rumors about the PRO 6 possibly featuring force touch technology appeared after a screenshot had been posted on social media.

Later that month, MediaTek announced that the Helio X25 system-on-a-chip was co-developed together with Meizu and will be exclusively used in the PRO 6.

On April 7, 2016, Meizu officially confirmed the launch event of the PRO 6 in Beijing for April 13, 2016.

=== Release ===
Pre-orders for the PRO 6 began after the launch event on April 13, 2016. Sales in mainland China began on April 30, 2016.

== Features ==
=== Flyme ===
The Meizu PRO 6 was released with an updated version of Flyme OS, a modified operating system based on Android Marshmallow. It features an alternative, flat design and improved one-handed usability. For the PRO 6, it has been extended by features for the pressure-sensitive 3D Press technology.

=== Hardware and design ===
The Meizu PRO 6 features a MediaTek Helio X25 with an array of ten ARM Cortex CPU cores, an ARM Mali-T880 MP4 GPU and 4 GB of RAM, which scores a result of 96765 points on the AnTuTu benchmark. This represents an increase of 13% compared to its predecessor, the Meizu PRO 5.

The Meizu PRO 6 has a full-metal body, which measures 153.6 mm (6.05 in) x 75.2 mm (2.96 in) x 7.25 mm (0.285 in) and weighs 155 g (5.5 oz). It has a slate form factor, being rectangular with rounded corners and has only one central physical button at the front. Unlike most other Android smartphones, the PRO 6 doesn't have capacitive buttons nor on-screen buttons. The functionality of these keys is implemented using a technology called mBack, which makes use of gestures with the physical button. This button also includes a fingerprint sensor called mTouch.

Furthermore, a haptic technology called 3D Press has debuted on the PRO 6, which allows the user to perform a different action by pressing the touchscreen instead of tapping.

The PRO 6 is available in three different colors (grey, silver and champagne gold) and comes with either 32 or 64 GB of internal storage.

The PRO 6 features a 5.2-inch Super AMOLED multi-touch capacitive touchscreen display with a (FHD resolution of 1080 by 1920 pixels. The pixel density of the display is 426.3 ppi.

In addition to the touchscreen input and the front key, the device has a volume/zoom control and the power/lock button on the right side and a 3.5mm TRS audio jack, which is powered by a dedicated Cirrus Logic CS43L36 Hi-Fi amplifier.

Just like its predecessor, it uses USB-C for both data connectivity and charging.

The Meizu PRO 6 has two cameras. The rear camera has a resolution of 21.16 MP, a ƒ/2.2 aperture and a 6-element lens. Furthermore, the phase-detection autofocus of the rear camera is laser-supported. The front camera has a resolution of 5 MP, a ƒ/2.0 aperture and a 5-element lens.

== Reception ==
The PRO 6 received mostly favorable reviews. Android Authority gave an overall rating of 7.9 out of 10 points, concluding that the PRO 6 "gets a lot right, such as the build quality, the display [..], an extremely fast and accurate fingerprint scanner, and a great sounding speaker".

AndroidPit noted that the device offers good performance for an attractive price, concluding that "for $370 you get a phone with above average performance".

== See also ==
- Meizu
- Meizu PRO 5
