= MX2 (disambiguation) =

MX2 is a protein.

MX2 may also refer to:

- MX2 (aircraft), a carbon fiber two-seat tandem sport aircraft produced by MX Aircraft of North Carolina
- MX2 class in the Motocross World Championship
- MasterCook file extension
- Meizu MX2, a smartphone from Meizu
