= MX6 =

MX6 may refer to:

- Mazda MX-6, a car
- Meizu MX6, a smartphone
- Min'an Electric MX-6, a car
- Dongfeng Fengdu MX6, a car
