= Meizu MX2 =

Smartphone

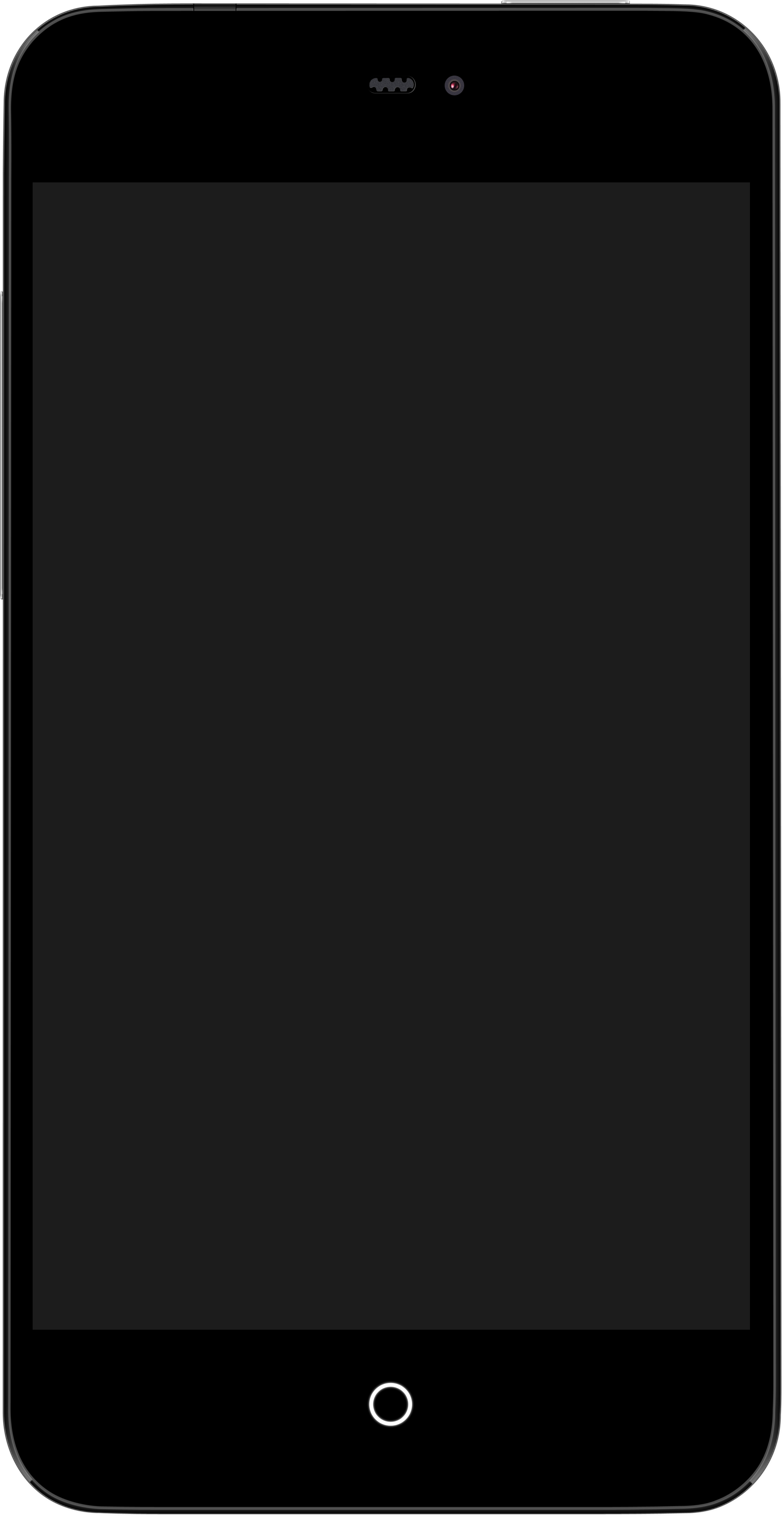
- Manufacturer: Meizu
- Type: Touchscreen smartphone
- Series: Meizu MX Series
- First released: November 27, 2012; 13 years ago
- Predecessor: Meizu MX
- Successor: Meizu MX3
- Compatible networks: GSM, UMTS, HSPA
- Dimensions: 124.9 mm (4.92 in) H 64.9 mm (2.56 in) W 10.2 mm (0.40 in) D
- Weight: 142 g (5.0 oz)
- Operating system: Flyme OS 2.0, based on Android 4.1.1 Jelly Bean
- System-on-chip: Samsung Exynos 4412 Quad
- CPU: Quad-core (4x1.6 GHz Cortex-A9)
- GPU: Mali-400 MP4
- Memory: 2 GB LPDDR2
- Storage: 16 GB, 32 GB or 64 GB flash memory
- Removable storage: Not supported
- Battery: 1800 mAh Li-Ion rechargeable battery, not replaceable
- Rear camera: 8 MP, PDAF autofocus, ƒ/2.4 aperture, LED flash, 1080p30 recording
- Front camera: 1.2 MP, ƒ/2.2 aperture, 720p30 recording
- Display: 4.4 inch diagonal IGZO; 800x1280 px (343 ppi)
- Connectivity: 3.5 mm TRS connector, Bluetooth 4.0, Dual-band WiFi (802.11 b/g/n)
- Data inputs: Multi-touch capacitive touchscreen, A-GPS, GLONASS, Accelerometer, Gyroscope, Proximity sensor, Digital compass, Ambient light sensor

The Meizu MX2 is a smartphone designed and produced by the Chinese manufacturer Meizu, which runs on Flyme OS, Meizu's modified Android operating system. It is a previous model of the MX series, succeeding the Meizu MX and preceding the Meizu MX3. It was unveiled on November 27, 2012 in Beijing.

== History ==
Images of the Meizu MX successor leaked on November 16, 2012. According to this leak, the MX2 no longer has the 3:2 display aspect ratio like the predecessor.

Further leaked images confirming the widescreen display aspect ratio and 4.4-inch display appeared on November 21.

=== Release ===
The Meizu MX2 was officially launched in Beijing on November 27, 2012. The MX2 became available on the China Unicom network on January 23, 2013.

== Features ==
=== Flyme ===
The Meizu MX2 was released with an updated version of Flyme OS, a modified operating system based on Android Jelly Bean. It features an alternative, flat design and improved one-handed usability.

=== Hardware and design ===
The Meizu MX2 features a Samsung Exynos 4412 Quad system-on-a-chip with an array of four ARM Cortex-A9 CPU cores, a Mali-400MP4 GPU and 2 GB of RAM. The Meizu MX2 reaches a score of 12,194 points on the AnTuTu benchmark.

The MX2 is available in two different colors (black with white and full-white) and comes with 16 GB, 32 GB or 64 GB of internal storage.

The body of the MX2 measures 124.9 mm (4.92 in) x 64.9 mm (2.56 in) x 10.2 mm (0.40 in) and weighs 142 g (5.0 oz). It has a slate form factor, being rectangular with rounded corners. The MX2 uses capacitive buttons for menu navigation.

The MX2 features a 4.4-inch IGZO multi-touch capacitive touchscreen display with an HD resolution of 800 by 1280 pixels. The pixel density of the display is 343 ppi.

In addition to the touchscreen input and the front key, the device has volume/zoom control buttons and the power/lock button on the right side, a 3.5mm TRS audio jack on the top and a microUSB (Micro-B type) port on the bottom for charging and connectivity.

The Meizu MX2 has two cameras. The rear camera has a resolution of 8 MP, a ƒ/2.4 aperture, autofocus and an LED flash. The front camera has a resolution of 1.2 MP and a ƒ/2.2 aperture.

== Reception ==
The MX2 received positive reviews.

FoneArena concluded that "the MX2 stands out from the crowd with a consistently beautiful hardware and software experience that you don't see on many Android devices these days" and praised the build quality as well as the superb performance of the device.

== See also ==
- Meizu
- Meizu MX
- Meizu MX3
- Meizu MX5
