= Meizu MX6 =

Smartphone

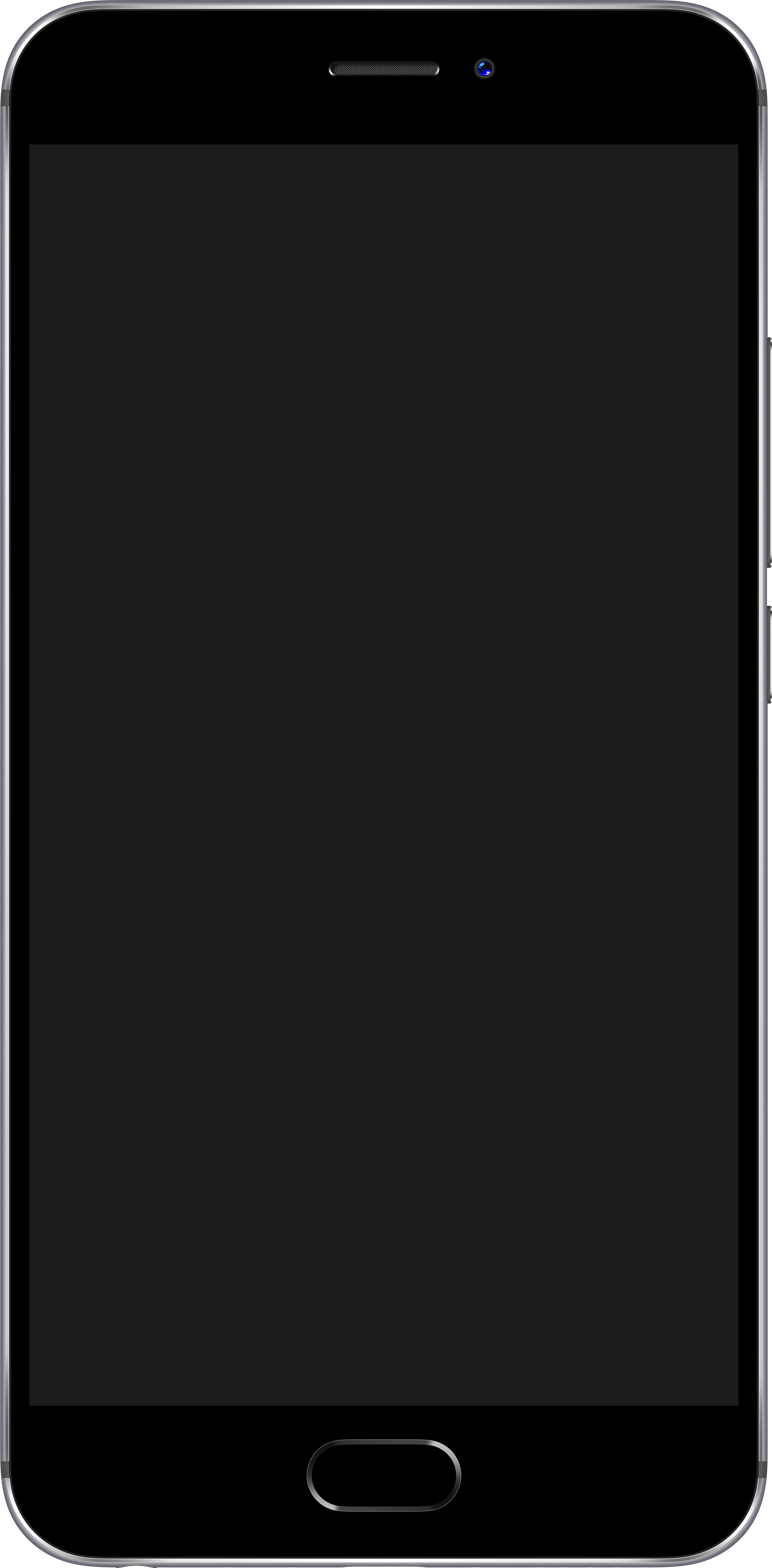
- Manufacturer: Meizu
- Type: Touchscreen smartphone
- Series: Meizu MX Series
- First released: July 19, 2016; 10 years ago
- Predecessor: Meizu MX5
- Compatible networks: GSM, UMTS, HSPA, LTE
- Dimensions: 153.6 mm (6.05 in) H 75.2 mm (2.96 in) W 7.3 mm (0.29 in)
- Weight: 155 g (5.5 oz)
- Operating system: Flyme OS, based on Android 6.0 Marshmallow
- System-on-chip: MediaTek MT6797 Helio X20
- CPU: 10-core, (2x2.3GHz Cortex-A72, 4x1.9GHz Cortex-A53, 4x1.4GHz Cortex-A53)
- GPU: ARM Mali-T880 MP4
- Memory: 4 GB LPDDR3
- Storage: 32 GB flash memory
- Removable storage: Not supported
- Battery: 3060 mAh Li-Ion rechargeable battery, not replaceable
- Rear camera: 12.0 MP, PDAF autofocus, ƒ/2.0 aperture, LED flash, 4K video recording
- Front camera: 5.0 MP, ƒ/2.0 aperture
- Display: 5.5 inch diagonal TDDI; 1080x1920 px (403 ppi)
- Connectivity: 3.5 mm TRS connector, Bluetooth 4.1 with BLE, Dual-band WiFi (802.11 a/b/g/n/ac), USB-C
- Data inputs: Multi-touch capacitive touchscreen, A-GPS, GLONASS, BDS, Accelerometer, Gyroscope, Proximity sensor, Digital compass, Ambient light sensor
- Other: Dual SIM support with dual standby mode

The Meizu MX6 is a smartphone designed and produced by the Chinese manufacturer Meizu, which runs on Flyme OS, Meizu's modified Android operating system. It is the company's latest model of the MX series, succeeding the Meizu MX5. It was unveiled on July 19, 2016, in Beijing.

== History ==
Initial rumors were released in January after AnTuTu benchmark results appeared online, stating that the upcoming device would feature a MediaTek Helio X20 System on a chip, 4 GB of RAM and a Full HD display. In July 2016, official invitations for the launch event on July 19, 2016, in Beijing were sent out.

Pre-orders for the MX6 began on July 19, 2016, and 3.2 million devices have been pre-registered for sale during the first day. Sales in mainland China began on July 30, 2016.

== Connectivity ==
The MX6 has a USB-C port.

== Reception ==
The MX6 received generally positive reviews. Forbes praised the device for its good value for money, high build quality due to its metal unibody frame and the gesture feature in Flyme OS, noting that "the Meizu MX6 is the best bargain on the market". Another review has stated that the rear camera represents a significant improvement in comparison to the previous generation.

== See also ==
- Meizu
- Meizu MX5
