= Force Touch =

Force-sensing touch technology developed by Apple Inc.

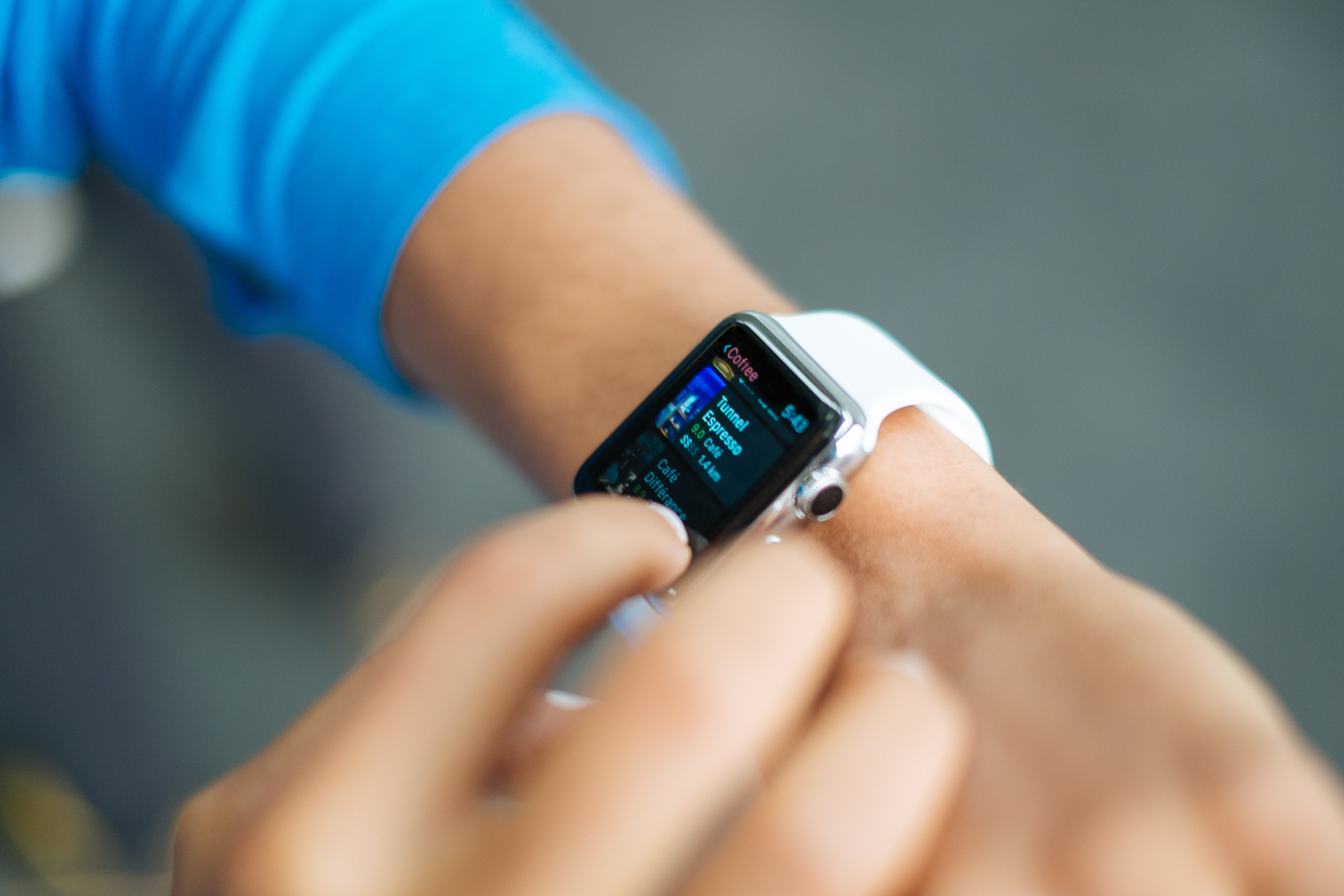
- Force Touch debuted on Apple Watch.
- Levels of input: Force Touch - 2; (Macbooks) - 3 (Continuous input for OS animations, and some inputs [drawing]); 3D Touch - 3 (continuous input for the OS animations); Haptic Touch - 1 (triggered by a long press)
- Design firm: Apple Inc.
- Introduced: September 9, 2014; 12 years ago

Force Touch is a haptic pressure-sensing technology developed by Apple Inc. that enables trackpads and touchscreens to sense the amount of force being applied to their surfaces. Software that uses Force Touch can distinguish between various levels of force for user interaction purposes. Force Touch was first unveiled on September 9, 2014, during the introduction of Apple Watch. Starting with the Apple Watch, Force Touch has been incorporated into many Apple products, including MacBooks and the Magic Trackpad 2.

Older iPhones have a similar technology known as 3D Touch. The technology brings usability enhancements to the software by offering a third dimension to accept input. Users can apply a force on the input surface to interact with the displayed content in a way that a normal touch would not. 3D Touch enables software features such as pressing hard to access a shortcut menu for an app, and pressing hard on a website link to show a preview of the web page.

3D Touch has three settings for input sensitivity. This enables users to customize a preference of light, medium, or firm press on the iPhone's screen. 3D Touch gives a continuous pressure reading to software that is running on the phone. Force Touch on the other hand, gives only two layers of interaction: A normal click and a force click. Apple's haptic engine called the Taptic Engine resides in these devices, which houses a linear actuator producing vibratory effects as feedback. Apple enabled application developers to leverage the pressure sensitivity of trackpads and touchscreens into their own apps. 3D Touch was discontinued with the iPhone 11 and onwards.

Haptic Touch is a software feature on the iPhone XR (but not the iPhone XS) and later iPhone models that serves to replace the functionality that 3D Touch had. The touchscreen no longer has a pressure sensitive layer, so the software waits for a long-press to activate certain features instead (for elements that don't already have a long press action assigned). This feature was added to the iPhone SE (1st generation) and iPod Touch (7th generation) with the iOS 13 update and to any iPad capable of running iPadOS 13.

As of watchOS 7, Force Touch is discontinued on all subsequent Apple Watches, and only Haptic Touch is recognized.

== User functionality ==
Force Touch on Macs is used to access a variety of features. A few notable ones are:

- Look up text to show more information from Dictionary, Wikipedia, etc.
- Show an Apple Maps preview of an address location.
- Add dates and events to Calendar.
- Preview details of website links, flight numbers, tracking numbers and events.
- Accelerate fast-forwarding and rewinding on QuickTime and iMovie using variable pressure.

3D Touch on iPhones was used to access features such as:

- Quick Actions allow users to access shortcuts, many right from the Home screen.
- Peek and Pop allows users to preview content and take actions on it, without having to open it. Pressing further, the user can pop into the content in the app.
- Pressure Sensitivity allows creative apps to take advantage of the pressure-sensing display, for varying line thickness or giving a brush a changing style.
- Holding down to: preview Live Photos; open the App Switcher (iPhone 6s, 6s Plus, 7, 7 Plus, 8, and 8 Plus only); etc.
- Pressing down on the keyboard displays a cursor which can be moved in two dimensions. Pressing again enters selection mode.

Force Touch on Apple Watch was used to access some significant features, such as:

- See alternate watch faces from the current watch face.
- Get the analog, digital, graph, and hybrid modes on the stopwatch app.
- Toggle between day, list, or today view on the calendar app.
- See weather, rain predictions and temperature on the weather app.

== Software ==
Apple enables application developers to integrate the force touch functionality into their applications. The APIs facilitate the following interactions:

- Apps respond to a press of stronger pressure, providing a shortcut as an additional functionality.
- Pressure sensitivity for drawing and creative apps to make lines thicker or give brushes a changing style.
- Accelerators allow receiving pressure sensitivity, to give users greater control. Say, fast-forward in media playback can speed up as pressure increases.
- Drag and drop to allow users react to a force gesture amidst the hold, to immediately open a new target for the drop.

== Hardware ==
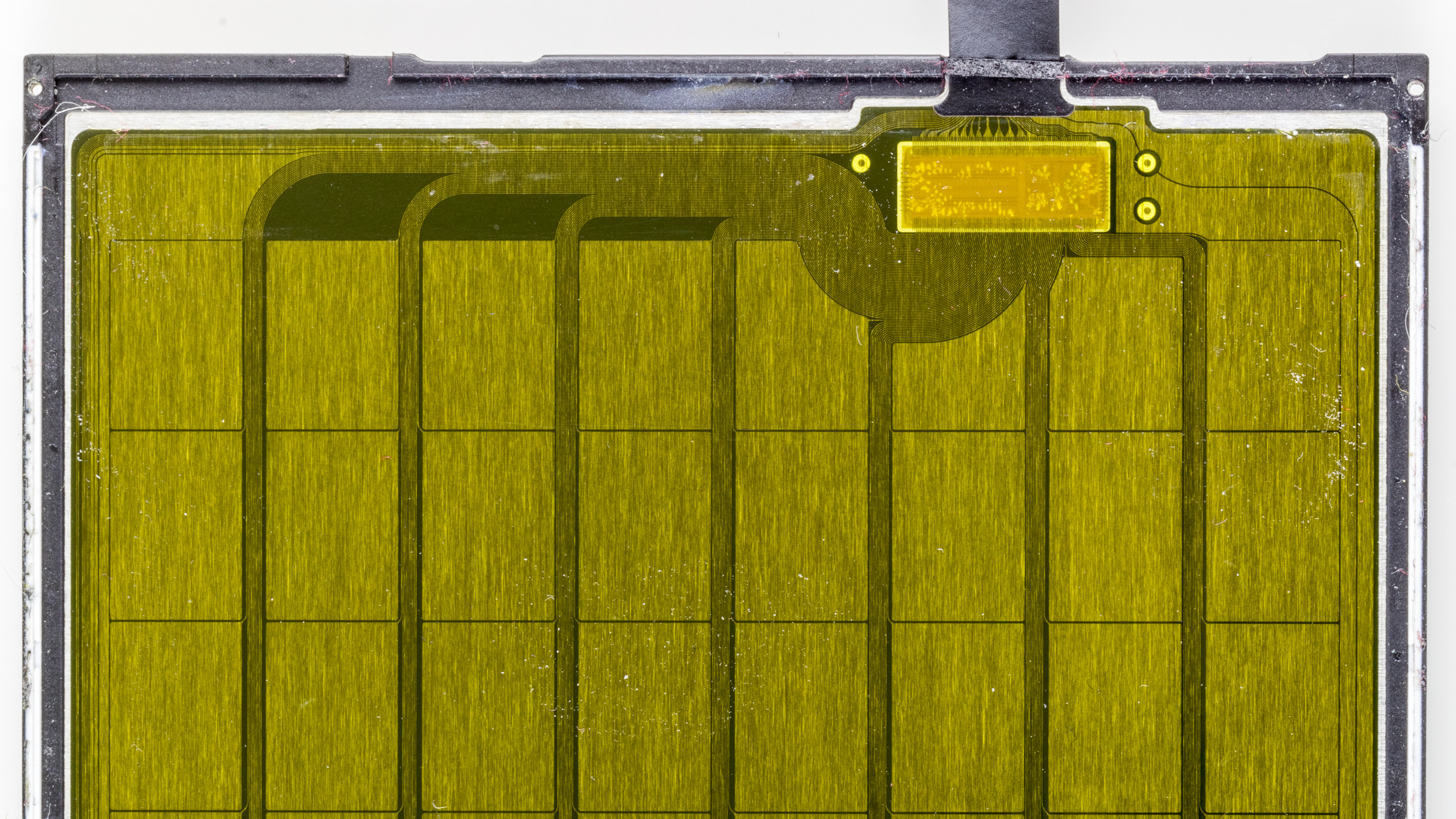
Capacitive sensors behind the display of an iPhone 6s

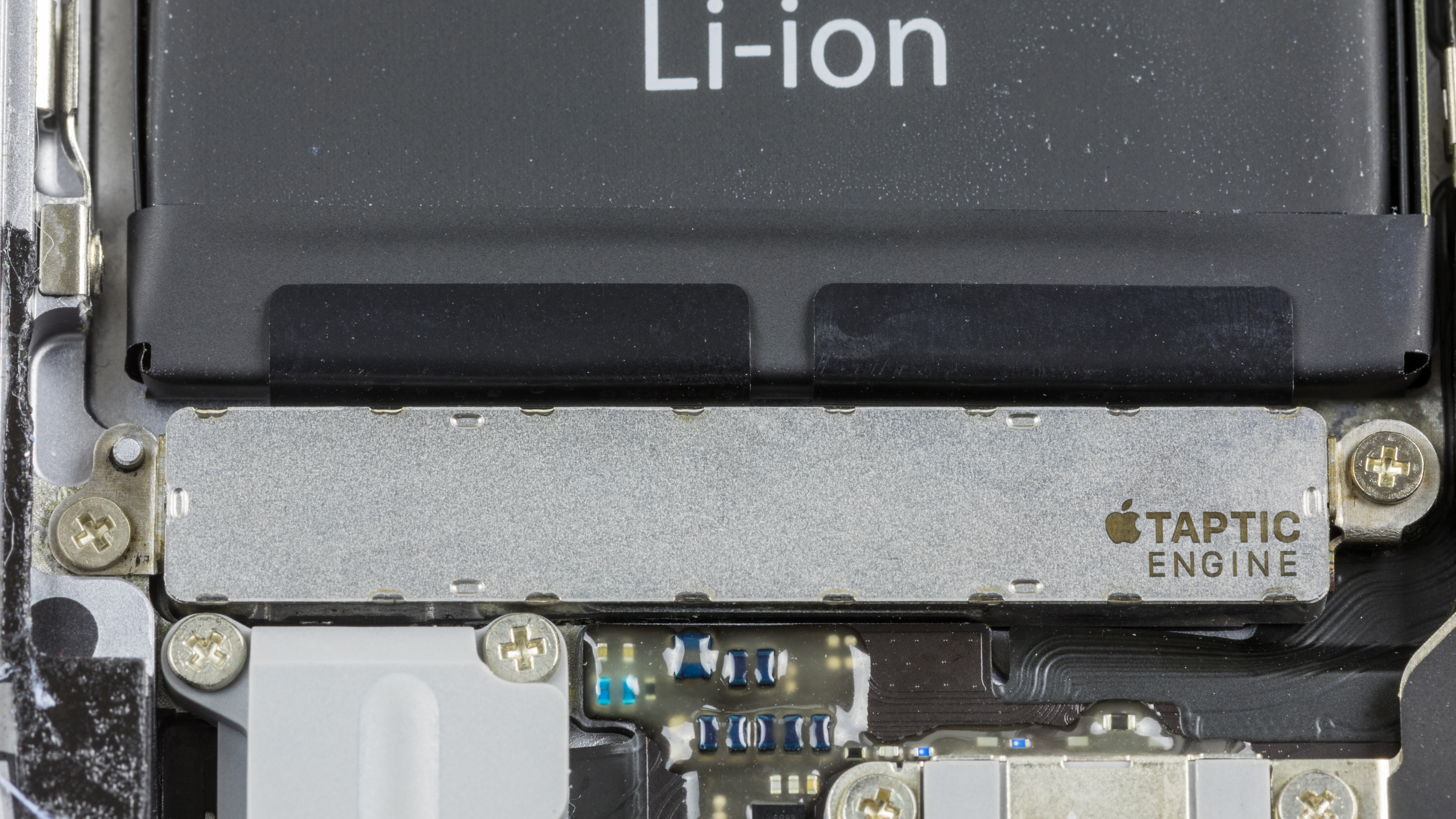
Taptic Engine embedded into the iPhone 6s

On iPhones with 3D Touch, the capacitive sensors are directly integrated into the display. When a press is detected, these capacitive sensors measure microscopic changes in the distance between the backlight and the cover glass. On the Apple Watch, a series of electrodes line the curvature of the screen. When a press is detected, these electrodes determine the pressure applied. The trackpads deploy a similar mechanism, although sensory information is determined by a series of four sensors that align with the corners of the trackpad. The detected pressure is then relayed to the Taptic Engine, which is Apple's haptic feedback engine. The electromagnetic linear actuator within the Taptic engine is capable of reaching its peak output in just one cycle and producing vibrations that last 10 milliseconds. Unlike typical motors, the linear actuator does not rotate but oscillates back and forth. The Taptic Engine produces immediate haptic feedback, without the need to offset the balance of mass. The haptic feedback produced may be accompanied by an audible tone. This helps in gaining the user's attention in order to convey an important information such as a success, warning or a failure. Each haptic type is defined for a specific purpose, to convey a specific meaning.

== Mechanics ==
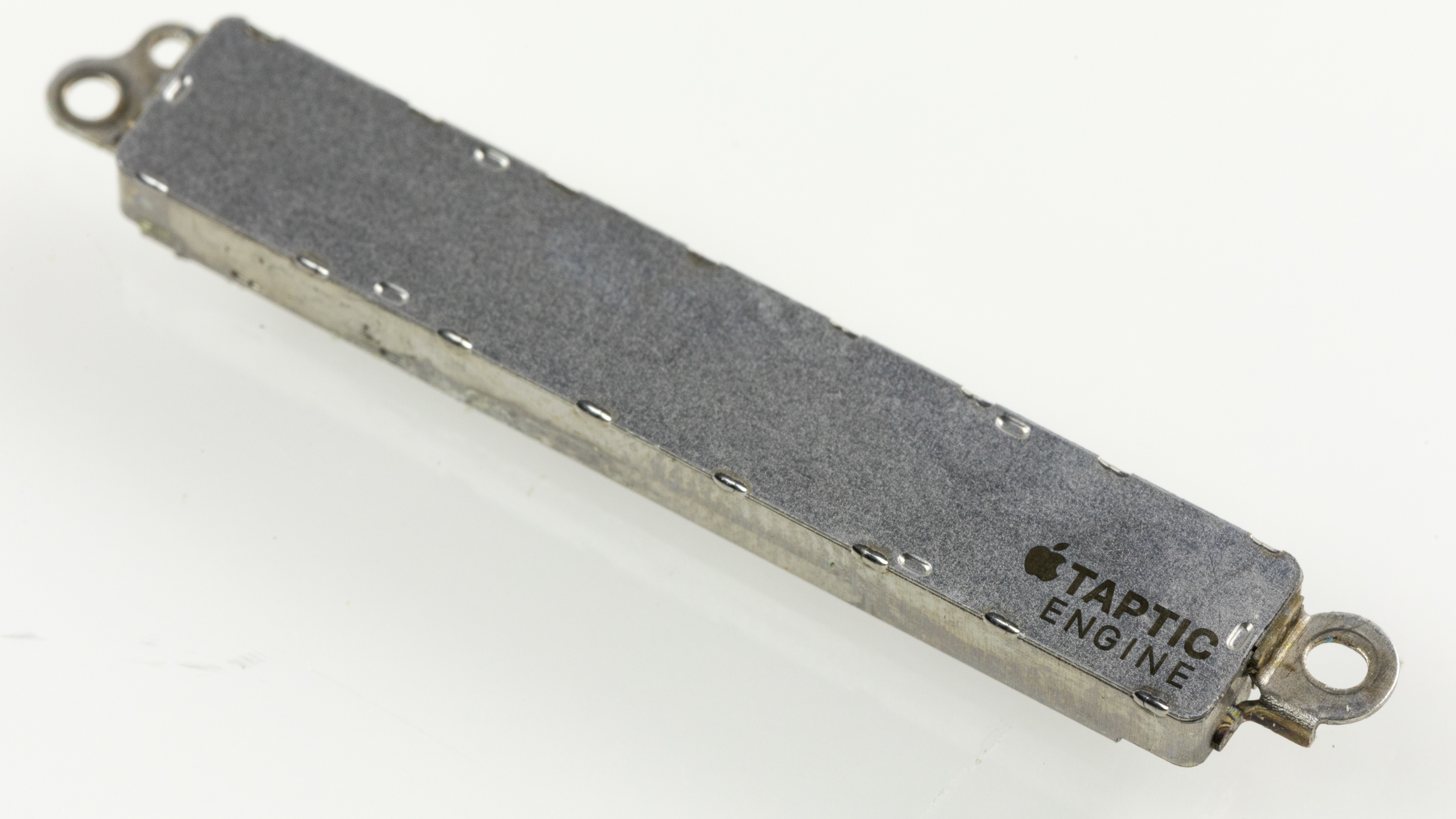
Taptic Engine module used in the iPhone 6s

The touch sensitive surface is either a trackpad or a touch screen. Multiple actuators are mechanically connected to the back of the input surface. The actuators are distributed along the surface, each at a separate contact location, to provide localized haptic feedback to the user. Piezoelectricity is used by actuators to convert the physically-induced vibration or the input displacement into an electrical signal. A controller is configured to activate the actuators in and around the point of contact. The actuators at the point of contact induces waveforms to produce vibration. However, since there are multiple actuators around the point of contact, the vibration can propagate to other locations, thus limiting the localization effect. This is why a second set of actuators induce waveforms to suppress the vibratory cross-talk produced by the first set of actuators. This may be achieved by producing waveforms that provides interference in terms of amplitude, frequency or both. The masking waveforms could also alter the vibration at contact locations by providing a user experience other than just suppressing the propagated vibrations.

== Products ==
Force Touch or Haptic Touch technology is built into the following Apple devices:

Force Touch	MacBook generations: Retina · Air from 2018 onwards · Pro from early 2015 onwards Apple Watch generations: Original to 5 Magic Trackpad 2
Haptic Touch	iPhone: Any model that supports iOS 13 and later except for those supporting 3D Touch (see below) iPod Touch (7th) since iOS 13 iPad: Any model that supports iPadOS 13 and later

3D Touch technology is built into the following Apple devices:

3D Touch	iPhone: 6S / 6S Plus · 7 / 7 Plus · 8 / 8 Plus · X (Note: Applies to iPhone X. Works on iOS 11 and iOS 12 only.) · XS / XS Max (Note: Applies to iPhone XS and iPhone XS Max. Works on iOS 12 only.)

== Litigation ==
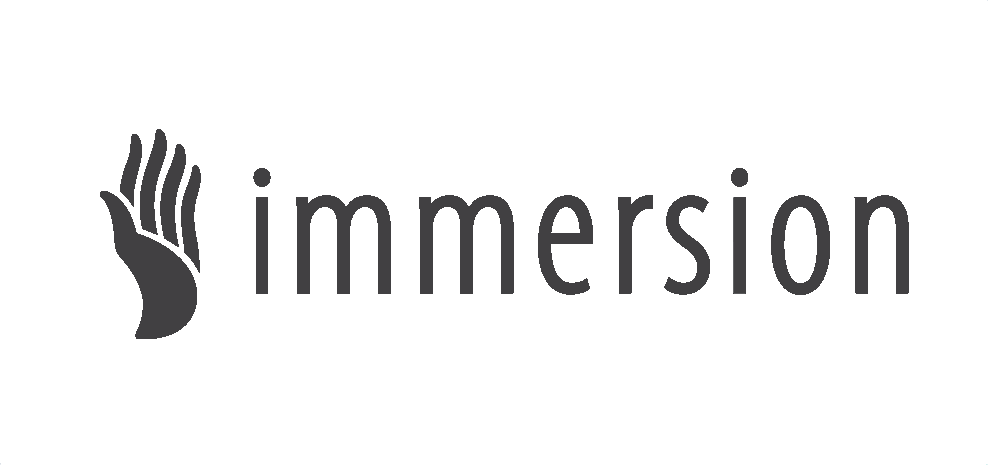
Immersion Corp. filed the lawsuit in 2016, which was settled by 2018.

Apple Inc. was subjected to a lawsuit by Immersion Corporation on February 11, 2016, due to allegations of infringing patents owned by Immersion on 3D Touch technology. According to the complaint, the asserted patents generally related to the apparatus and methods used in the implementation of pressure-enabled haptics to enhance the user experience on electronic devices. The violated patents with their corresponding description are as follows:

1. U.S. Patent Nos. 8,619,051: Relates to a haptic feedback system including a controller, an associated memory, actuator drive and the drive's circuit. The memory stores at least one haptic effect that is executed by the controller.
2. U.S. Patent Nos. 8,773,356: Relates to systems and methods for providing tactile sensations which are disclosed, such as the steps of outputting a display signal configured to preview a graphical object on a touch-sensitive input device.
3. U.S. Patent Nos. 8,659,571: Relates to a system that produces a dynamic haptic effect and generates a drive signal that includes a gesture signal and a real or virtual device sensor signal.

In May 2016, a second lawsuit in the same District of Delaware court made the claim that Apple had knowingly infringed on four patents in the iPhone 6s and models of the MacBook and MacBook Pro lines. In June, the United States International Trade Commission confirmed it would launch an investigation into Immersion's claims. The violated patents from the second lawsuit, with their corresponding description are as follows:

1. U.S. Patent Nos. 8,749,507: Relates to systems and methods in which the mobile electronic device determines a pressure and a change in pressure based on contact data.
2. U.S. Patent Nos. 7,808,488: Relates to systems and methods for generating an actuator signal to output a haptic effect based on the user's interaction with a graphical object on a touchscreen.
3. U.S. Patent Nos. 7,336,260: Relates to systems in which the electronic device detects different levels of pressure on the device and providing a tactile sensation in response.
4. U.S. Patent Nos. 8,581,710: Relates to systems and methods for generating an actuator signal to output a haptic effect indicating whether the user's input is recognised or unrecognised and that a corresponding command was or was not found.

On January 29, 2018, Immersion released a brief statement confirming that the company had reached global settlement and license agreements with Apple, the terms of which would be kept confidential.

== Similar and related technologies ==
Phones including the ZTE Axon mini, Meizu Pro 6, Huawei Mate S, and the Huawei P9 Plus feature a pressure sensitive display, and the Google Pixel 4 features a software-based technology called Firm Press, which tries to guess the force of pressure using machine learning.

The API of Android OS added support for pressure-sensitive touching in 2009 with Android 2.0 Éclair, even though no according hardware existed at that time.

Nokia had a development project called 'Goldfinger' in 2013, which used a completely different type of 3D touch interface, which required the user to hover their finger above the screen. It would have been a Lumia smartphone if released. It was later renamed to Nokia Lumia McLaren and was under development by Microsoft Mobile. It was eventually cancelled in June 2013.

== See also ==
- MacBook
- iPhone
- Apple Watch
- Haptic technology
