= Meizu PRO 7 =

Android smartphone

Meizu PRO 7 Meizu PRO 7 Plus
- Manufacturer: Meizu
- Type: Smartphone
- Series: PRO
- First released: July 26, 2017; 9 years ago
- Predecessor: Meizu PRO 6
- Successor: Meizu 15
- Compatible networks: GSM, 3G, 4G (LTE)
- Form factor: Slate
- Colors: PRO 7: Black, Gold, Red; PRO 7 Plus: Black, Gold, Silver, Space Black
- Dimensions: PRO 7: 147.6 mm (5.81 in) H 70.7 mm (2.78 in) W 7.3 mm (0.29 in) D PRO 7 Plus: 157.3 mm (6.19 in) H 77.2 mm (3.04 in) W 7.3 mm (0.29 in) D
- Weight: PRO 7: 163 g (5.7 oz); PRO 7 Plus: 170 g (6.0 oz)
- Operating system: Original: Android 7.0 Nougat + Flyme 6 Current: Android 7.0 Nougat + Flyme 8
- System-on-chip: PRO 7 Standard: MediaTek MT6757T Helio P25 (16 nm); PRO 7 High/Plus: MediaTek MT6799 Helio X30 (10 nm)
- CPU: PRO 7 Standard: Octa-core (4×2.4 GHz Cortex-A53 & 4×1.6 GHz Cortex-A53); PRO 7 High/Plus: Deca-core (2×2.6 GHz Cortex-A73 & 4×1.9 GHz Cortex-A35 & 4×2.2 GHz Cortex-A53)
- GPU: PRO 7 Standard: Mali-T880MP2; PRO 7 High/Plus: PowerVR 7XTP
- Memory: PRO 7: 4 GB; PRO 7 Plus: 6 GB; LPDDR4X
- Storage: 64/128 GB; PRO 7: eMMC 5.1; PRO 7 High/Plus: UFS 2.1
- SIM: Dual SIM (Nano-SIM)
- Battery: Both models: Non-removable Li-Ion; PRO 7: 3000 mAh; PRO 7 Plus: 3500 mAh
- Charging: Both models: 24W fast charging PRO 7: mCharge 3 PRO 7 Plus: mCharge 4, 45% in 30 min (advertised)
- Rear camera: 12 MP Sony IMX386, f/2.0, 26mm (wide), 1/2.9", 1.25 µm, PDAF + 12 MP Sony IMX386, f/2.0, 26mm (monochrome), 1/2.9", 1.25 µm, PDAF; Dual-LED dual-tone flash, HDR, panorama Video: 4K@30fps, 1080p@30fps
- Front camera: 16 MP, f/2.0, 26mm (wide), 1/3.06", 1 µm 1080p@30fps
- Display: PRO 7: 5.2 in, 1920 × 1080 (Full HD), 423 ppi PRO 7 Plus: 5.7 in, 2560 × 1440 (2K), 494 ppi Both models: Super AMOLED, 16:9 ratio Secondary display: AMOLED, 1.9 in, 240 × 536, 20.1:9 ratio, 307 ppi
- Model: PRO 7 Standard: m1792L (M792H, M792C-L, M792M-L, M792Q-L); PRO 7 High: m1792 (M792C, M792Q); PRO 7 Plus: m1793 (M793H, M793Q)
- Website: www.meizu.com/en/pro7/summary/

The Meizu PRO 7 and Meizu PRO 7 Plus are Android smartphones developed by Meizu, notable for featuring a secondary display on the rear panel. They were officially unveiled on July 26, 2017 and released on August 5, 2017.

== Design ==
The front screen is made of Corning Gorilla Glass 5. The body is constructed from aluminum.

On the bottom, there is a USB-C port, speaker, primary microphone, and a 3.5 mm audio jack. The top houses a secondary microphone. The left side features a dual SIM card slot. The right side contains the volume rocker and power/lock button.

The Meizu PRO 7 was sold in three colors: Black, Gold, and Red.

The 64 GB version of the Meizu PRO 7 Plus was sold in three colors: Black, Gold, and Silver. The 128 GB version was sold in two colors: Black and Space Black.

== Technical specifications ==
=== Platform ===
The standard version of the Meizu PRO 7 features a MediaTek Helio P25 processor paired with a Mali-T880MP2 GPU, while the advanced version of the Meizu PRO 7 and the PRO 7 Plus feature the MediaTek MT6799 Helio X30 paired with a PowerVR 7XTP GPU.

=== Battery ===
The Meizu PRO 7 includes a 3000 mAh battery with support for 24W mCharge 3 fast charging, whereas the PRO 7 Plus includes a 3500 mAh battery with support for 24W mCharge 4 fast charging.

=== Camera ===
Both smartphones feature a dual rear camera system: a 12 MP f/2.0 wide lens alongside a 12 MP f/2.0 monochrome lens with phase-detection autofocus (PDAF) and support for 4K video recording at 30 fps. The front-facing camera has a 16 MP resolution with an f/2.0 wide aperture, capable of recording 1080p video at 30 fps.

=== Display ===
The Meizu PRO 7 features a 5.2-inch Super AMOLED "mBack" display with a resolution of 1920 × 1080 (Full HD), a 16:9 aspect ratio, and a pixel density of 423 ppi.

The Meizu PRO 7 Plus features a 5.7-inch Super AMOLED display with a resolution of 2560 × 1440 (2K), a 16:9 aspect ratio, and a pixel density of 494 ppi.

Additionally, both models feature a rear-facing Super AMOLED secondary display with a 1.9-inch diagonal, 240 × 536 resolution, 20.1:9 aspect ratio, and a pixel density of 307 ppi.

=== Memory ===
The Meizu PRO 7 was sold in 4/64 GB and 4/128 GB configurations, while the Meizu PRO 7 Plus came in 6/64 GB and 6/128 GB configurations.

The standard version utilizes eMMC 5.1 storage, whereas the advanced PRO 7 and PRO 7 Plus models utilize faster UFS 2.1 storage.

=== Software ===
The smartphones were released running Flyme 6 based on Android 7.0 Nougat, and were later updated to Flyme 8.
