= Meizu 15 =

Smartphone series manufactured by Meizu

Meizu 15 Meizu 15 Plus Meizu 15 Lite (Meizu M15 in China)
- Manufacturer: Meizu
- Type: 15/Lite: smartphone 15 Plus: phablet
- Series: Meizu/M
- First released: April 22, 2018; 8 years ago
- Predecessor: Meizu PRO 7
- Successor: Meizu 16th Meizu 16X
- Compatible networks: GSM, 3G, 4G (LTE)
- Form factor: Slate
- Colors: 15: Black, Blue, White, Gold; 15 Plus: Black, Gray, Gold; 15 Lite: Black, Gold, Red.
- Dimensions: 15: 143 × 72 × 7.3 mm 15 Plus: 153.8 × 78.3 × 7.3 mm 15 Lite: 143.62 × 72.38 × 7.45 mm
- Weight: 15: 152 g 15 Plus: 177 g 15 Lite: 145 g
- Operating system: Initial: Android 7.1.2 Nougat + Flyme 7 Current: Android 7.1.2 Nougat + Flyme 8
- System-on-chip: 15: Qualcomm SDM660 Snapdragon 660 (14 nm); 15 Plus: Exynos 8895 (10 nm); 15 Lite: Qualcomm MSM8953-Pro Snapdragon 626 (14 nm)
- CPU: 15: Octa-core (4×2.2 GHz Kryo 260 Gold & 4×1.8 GHz Kryo 260 Silver); 15 Plus: Octa-core (4×2.5 GHz Mongoose M2 & 4×1.7 GHz Cortex-A53); 15 Lite: 8×2.2 GHz Cortex-A53
- GPU: 15: Adreno 512; 15 Plus: Mali-G71 MP20; 15 Lite: Adreno 506
- Memory: 15: 4 GB LPDDR4X; 15 Plus: 6 GB LPDDR4X; 15 Lite: 4 GB LPDDR3/LPDDR4X
- Storage: 15: 64/128 GB eMMC 5.1; 15 Plus: 64/128 GB UFS 2.1; 15 Lite: 64 GB eMMC 5.1
- Removable storage: 15/Plus: None; 15 Lite: microSDXC up to 512 GB
- SIM: 15/Plus: Dual SIM (Nano-SIM); 15 Lite: Hybrid Dual SIM (Nano-SIM)
- Battery: All models: Non-removable, Li-Ion; 15/Lite: 3000 mAh; 15 Plus: 3500 mAh
- Charging: 15/Plus: 24 W mCharge 4 fast charging 15 Lite: 18 W fast charging
- Rear camera: 15/Plus: 12 MP Sony IMX380, f/1.8, 1/2.3", 1.55 µm, dual pixel PDAF, laser AF, 4-axis OIS + 20 MP, 1/2.8", 1 µm, AF, portraits only Video: 4K@30fps, 1080p@30fps, gyro-EIS (15 Plus); 15 Lite: 12 MP Sony IMX362, f/1.9, 1.4 µm, dual pixel PDAF; Video: 1080p@30fps All models: 6-LED dual-tone flash, HDR, panorama
- Front camera: 20 MP, f/2.0 (wide-angle), 1/2.8", 1 µm Video: 1080p@30fps
- Display: 15: Super AMOLED, 5.46", 1920 × 1080 (FHD), 403 ppi 15 Plus: Super AMOLED 5.95", 2560 × 1440 (QHD), 494 ppi 15 Lite: LTPS IPS LCD, 5.46", 1920 × 1080 (FHD), 403 ppi All models: 16:9 aspect ratio
- Sound: 15/Plus: Stereo sound 15 Lite: Mono sound
- Media: Video: MP4, 3GP, MOV, MKV, AVI, FLV, MPEG, M2TS, TS; Audio: FLAC, APE, AAC, MKA, Ogg, MP3, MIDI, M4A, AMR, WAV; Images: JPEG, PNG, GIF, BMP
- Connectivity: USB-C 2.0, 3.5 mm Audio, Bluetooth 4.2 (A2DP, LE); Wi-Fi: 15/Plus: 802.11 b/g/n/ac (dual-band, Wi-Fi Direct), 15 Lite: 802.11 a/b/g/n (Wi-Fi Direct); Satellite navigation: 15/Lite: GPS, A-GPS, GLONASS, BeiDou; 15 Plus: GPS, A-GPS, GLONASS, BeiDou, Galileo, SBAS, QZSS
- Codename: 15: m1881 15 Plus: m1891 15 Lite: m1871
- Other: Fingerprint scanner (built into the mTouch button), accelerometer, gyroscope, proximity sensor, compass, barometer (except 15 Lite)

The Meizu 15 is a line of Android smartphones developed by Meizu, released to mark the company's 15th anniversary. It was unveiled on April 22, 2018, and consists of the base Meizu 15, the upgraded and larger Meizu 15 Plus, and the simplified Meizu 15 Lite (known in China as the Meizu M15). The Meizu 15 line is the successor to the Meizu PRO 7 series.

== Design ==
The front panel is made of glass. The body is primarily made of aluminum, but the white version of the Meizu 15 features a material supposed to felt "ceramic".

The design of the smartphones was unusual. The devices featured displays with a 16:9 aspect ratio at a time when most phones had begun transitionining to narrower 18:9 displays.

On the bottom, there is a USB-C port, speaker, microphone, and a 3.5 mm audio jack. On the top is a second microphone. The left side houses the volume buttons, while the right side contains the power button and the SIM slot. The Meizu 15 and Meizu 15 Plus feature a dual SIM card slot, while the Meizu 15 Lite uses a hybrid slot for either two SIM cards or one SIM card and a microSD card up to 512 GB. On the bezel below the screen, there is a circular capacitive "mTouch" button with an integrated fingerprint scanner.

The Meizu 15 was sold in Black, Blue, White, and Gold. The Meizu 15 Plus was available in Black, Gray, and Gold, while the Meizu 15 Lite came in Black, Gold, and Red.

== Specifications ==
=== Platform ===
The Meizu 15 is powered by a Qualcomm Snapdragon 660 processor with an Adreno 512 GPU. On the other hand, the Meizu 15 Plus features a Samsung Exynos 8895 with a Mali-G71 MP20 GPU, and the Meizu 15 Lite uses a Qualcomm Snapdragon 626 with an Adreno 506.

=== Battery ===
The Meizu 15 and Meizu 15 Lite are equipped with a 3000 mAh battery, while the 15 Plus has a 3500 mAh battery. The Meizu 15 and Meizu 15 Plus support mCharge 4 fast charging up to 24 W, while the Meizu 15 Lite supports fast charging up to 18 W.

=== Camera (Main & Front) ===
The Meizu 15 and Meizu 15 Plus feature a dual main camera setup consisting of a 12 MP Sony IMX380 primary lens with an aperture of f/1.8, dual pixel phase-detection autofocus (PDAF), laser autofocus, and 4-axis optical image stabilization (OIS), paired with a 20 MP portrait lens with autofocus. In contrast, the Meizu 15 Lite has a single 12 MP Sony IMX362 main camera with an aperture of f/1.9 and dual pixel PDAF. All models feature a 20 MP wide-angle front-facing camera with an aperture of f/2.0.

The main cameras of the Meizu 15 and Meizu 15 Plus can record video at 4K@30fps, while the main camera of the Meizu 15 Lite and the front cameras of all models record at 1080p@30fps.

=== Display ===
All models feature displays with a 16:9 aspect ratio. The base and Plus models use Super AMOLED technology, while the Lite model uses an LTPS IPS LCD. The Meizu 15 and Meizu 15 Lite have 5.46" displays with Full HD (1920 × 1080) resolution and a pixel density of 403 ppi. The Meizu 15 Plus features a 5.95" QHD (2560 × 1440) display with a pixel density of 494 ppi.

=== Audio ===
The Meizu 15 and Meizu 15 Plus feature stereo speakers, with the earpiece serving as the second speaker. The Meizu 15 Lite has only a single multimedia speaker.

=== Memory ===
The Meizu 15 was sold in 4/64 GB and 4/128 GB configurations. The Meizu 15 Plus was available in 6/64 GB and 6/128 GB, while the Meizu 15 Lite was offered in a 4/64 GB or 4/128 GB configuration.

=== Software ===
The smartphones were launched with FlymeOS 7 based on Android 7.1.2 Nougat and were subsequently updated to Flyme 8.
