= Meizu PRO 5 Ubuntu Edition =

Smartphone

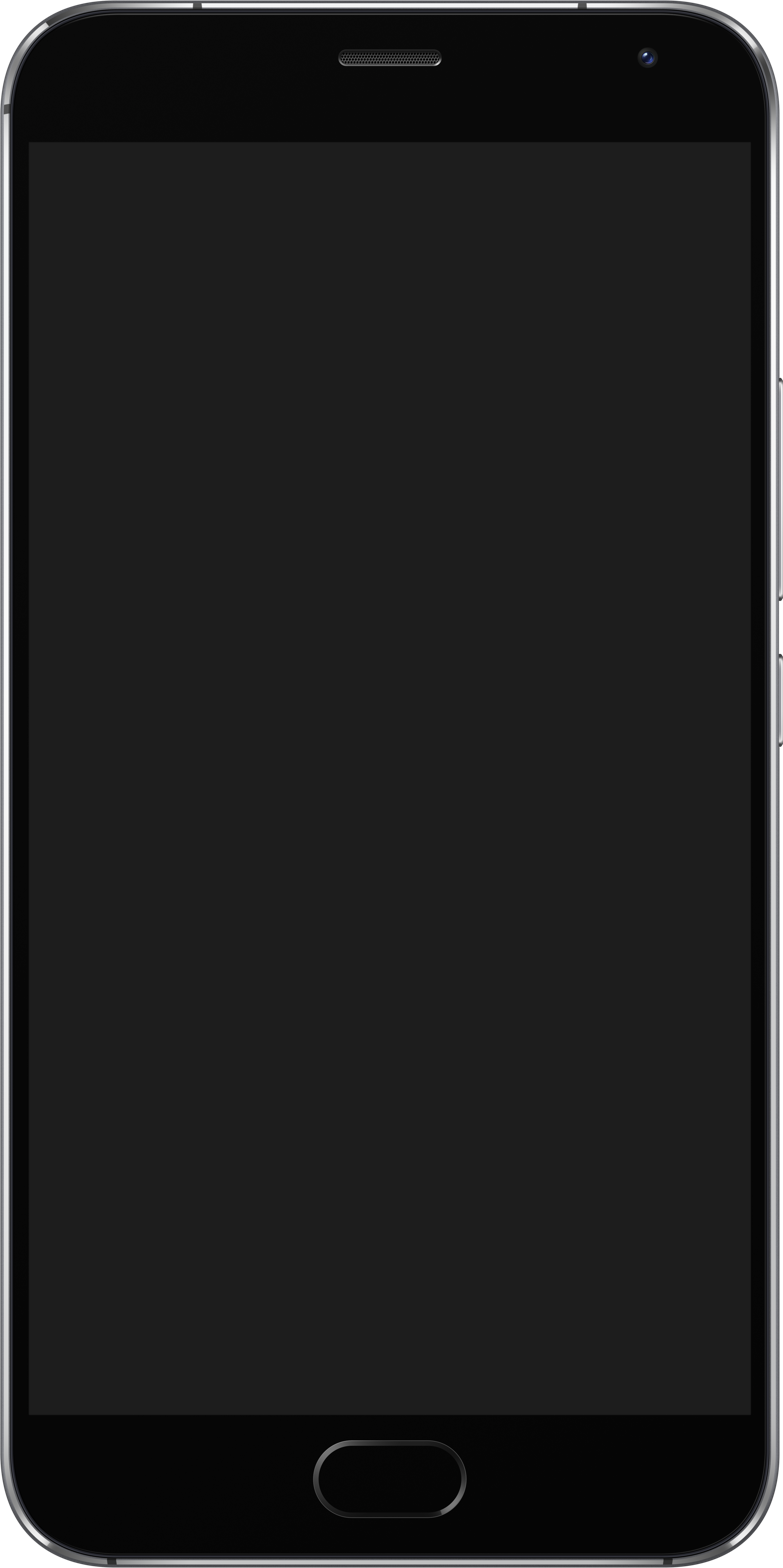
- Manufacturer: Meizu
- Type: Touchscreen smartphone
- Series: Meizu PRO Series
- First released: February 17, 2016; 10 years ago
- Compatible networks: GSM, UMTS, HSPA, LTE
- Dimensions: 156.7 mm (6.17 in) H 78.0 mm (3.07 in) W 7.5 mm (0.30 in) D
- Weight: 168 g (5.9 oz)
- Operating system: Ubuntu Touch
- System-on-chip: Samsung Exynos 7420 Octa
- CPU: 8-core (4x2.1 GHz Cortex-A57 & 4x1.5 GHz Cortex-A53)
- GPU: ARM Mali-T760 MP8
- Memory: 3 GB LPDDR3
- Storage: 32 GB flash memory
- Removable storage: Not supported
- Battery: 3050 mAh Li-Ion rechargeable battery, not replaceable
- Rear camera: 21.16 MP, PDAF laser autofocus, ƒ/2.2 aperture, LED flash, 4K video recording
- Front camera: 5.0 MP, ƒ/2.0 aperture
- Display: 5.7 inch diagonal AMOLED; 1080x1920 px (426.3 ppi)
- Connectivity: 3.5 mm TRS connector, Bluetooth 4.0 with BLE, Dual-band WiFi (802.11 a/b/g/n/ac), USB-C
- Data inputs: Multi-touch capacitive touchscreen, A-GPS, GLONASS, BDS, Accelerometer, Gyroscope, Proximity sensor, Digital compass, Ambient light sensor
- Other: Dual SIM support with dual standby mode, Hi-FI amplifier

The Meizu PRO 5 Ubuntu Edition is a smartphone designed and produced by the Chinese manufacturer Meizu, which runs on Ubuntu Touch. It is an alternative version of the Meizu PRO 5. It was unveiled on February 17, 2016.

== History ==
Rumors about an Ubuntu-powered edition of the Meizu PRO 5 appeared after photos of a Meizu PRO 5 running Ubuntu Touch 15.04 had been leaked. It was reported that this device would be showcased at the Mobile World Congress in April 2016.

=== Release ===
The Meizu PRO 5 Ubuntu was officially released on February 17, 2016. International pre-orders began on February 22, 2016, through online retailer JD.com.

== Features ==
=== Ubuntu Touch ===
The PRO 5 Ubuntu Edition is running Ubuntu Touch, which is a mobile operating system based on the Ubuntu linux distribution developed by Canonical. Its goal is to provide a free and open-source mobile operating system and deliver a different approach to user experience by focusing on so-called "scopes" instead of traditional apps.

=== Hardware and design ===
The technical specifications and outer appearance of the PRO 5 Ubuntu Edition is identical with the Meizu PRO 5. The Meizu PRO 5 features a Samsung Exynos 7420 Octa with an array of eight ARM Cortex CPU cores, an ARM Mali-T760 MP8 GPU and 3 GB of RAM. Meizu Global Brand Manager Ard Boudeling explained in November 2015 that Meizu decided to use the Samsung Exynos SoC because it is "currently [..] the only option if you want to build a genuine premium device".

The Meizu PRO 5 Ubuntu Edition has a full-metal body, which measures 156.7 mm (6.17 in) x 78.0 mm (3.07 in) x 7.5 mm (0.30 in) and weighs 168 g (5.9 oz). It has a slate form factor, being rectangular with rounded corners and has only one central physical button at the front.

The PRO 5 Ubuntu Edition is only available in with 32 GB of internal storage and with a champagne gold body.

The PRO 5 Ubuntu Edition features a 5.7-inch AMOLED multi-touch capacitive touchscreen display with a (FHD resolution of 1080 by 1920 pixels. The pixel density of the display is 387 ppi.

In addition to the touchscreen input and the front key, the device has a volume/zoom control and the power/lock button on the right side and a 3.5mm TRS audio jack, which is powered by a dedicated Hi-Fi amplifier supporting 32-bit audio with a frequency range of up to 192 kHz.

The PRO 5 Ubuntu Edition uses a USB-C connector for both data connectivity and charging.

The Meizu PRO 5 Ubuntu Edition has two cameras. The rear camera has a resolution of 21.16 MP, a ƒ/2.2 aperture and a 6-element lens. Furthermore, the phase-detection autofocus of the rear camera is laser-supported. The front camera has a resolution of 5 MP, a ƒ/2.0 aperture and a 5-element lens.

== Reception ==
While the device itself had been praised for its specifications and build quality, critics have criticized the Ubuntu Touch operating system.

GSMArena stated that "overall, all the bits and pieces that made the Meizu Pro 5 great are still present, but even on paper, we can already see quite a lot of compromises brought about by the new OS in the Ubuntu Edition at hand".

Softpedia gave the device a rating of 4 out of 5 stars, concluding that they "would recommend [the] Meizu PRO 5 Ubuntu Edition to those who like smartphones with big screens, Ubuntu Phone fans [..], as well as very curious people who get bored easily and always enjoy trying something new".

== See also ==
- Meizu
- Meizu PRO 5
- List of open-source mobile phones
