= Meizu MX5 =

Android smartphone

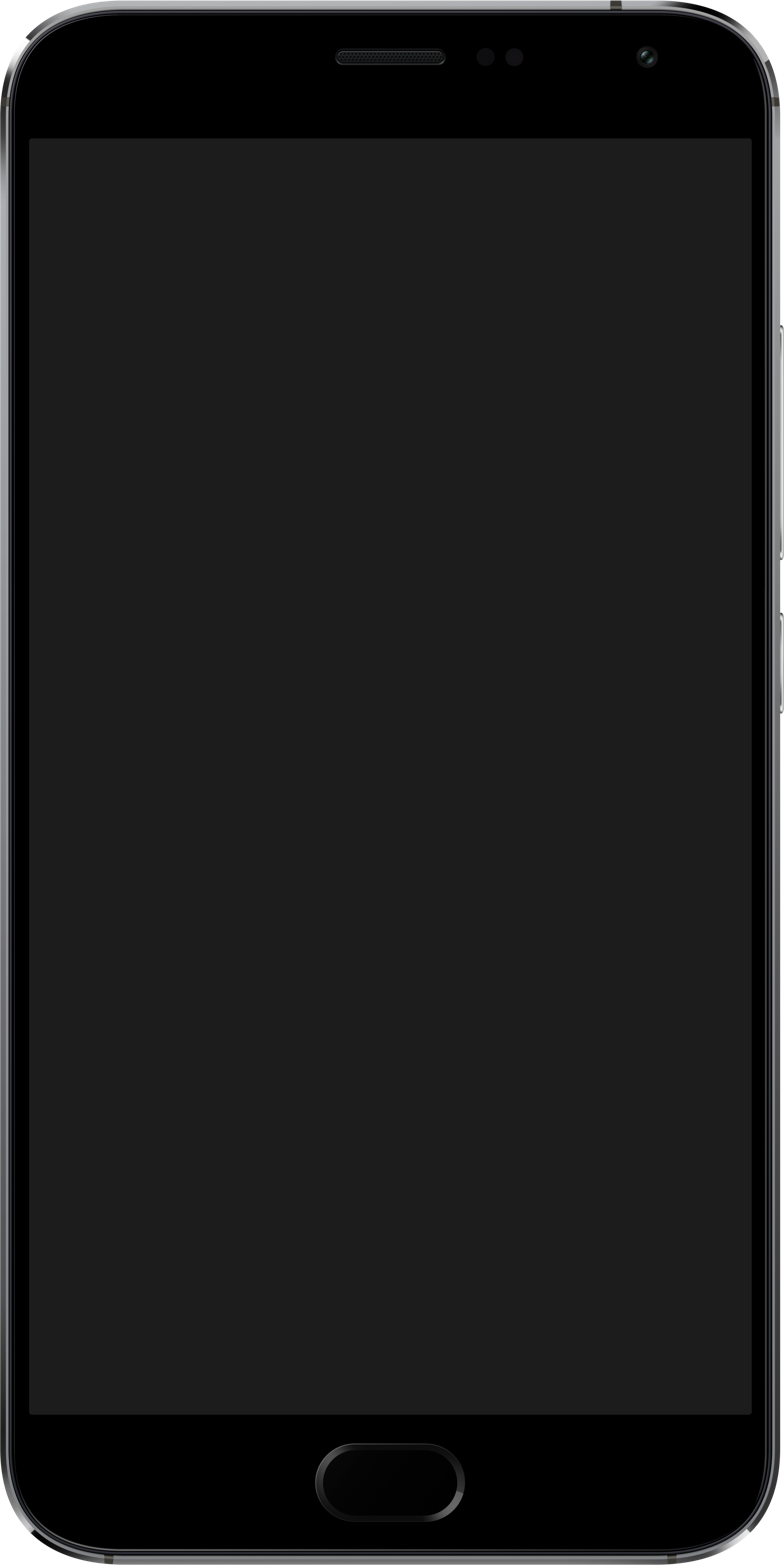
- Manufacturer: Meizu
- Type: Touchscreen smartphone
- Series: Meizu MX Series
- First released: June 30, 2015; 11 years ago
- Predecessor: Meizu MX4
- Successor: Meizu MX6
- Compatible networks: GSM, UMTS, HSPA, LTE
- Dimensions: 149.9 mm (5.90 in) H 74.7 mm (2.94 in) W 7.6 mm (0.30 in) D
- Weight: 149 g (5.3 oz)
- Operating system: Flyme OS, based on Android 5.1 Lollipop
- System-on-chip: MediaTek MT6795 Helio X10
- CPU: Octa-core (8x2.2GHz Cortex-A53)
- GPU: PowerVR G6200
- Memory: 3 GB LPDDR3
- Storage: 16 GB, 32 GB or 64 GB flash memory
- Removable storage: Not supported
- Battery: 3150 mAh Li-Ion rechargeable battery, not replaceable
- Rear camera: 20.7 MP, laser-aided PDAF autofocus, ƒ/2.2 aperture, LED flash, 4K recording
- Front camera: 5.0 MP, ƒ/2.0 aperture
- Display: 5.5 inch diagonal AMOLED; 1080x1920 px (403 ppi)
- Connectivity: 3.5 mm TRS connector, Bluetooth 4.0 with BLE, Dual-band WiFi (802.11 a/b/g/n/ac)
- Data inputs: Multi-touch capacitive touchscreen, A-GPS, GLONASS, Accelerometer, Gyroscope, Proximity sensor, Digital compass, Ambient light sensor
- Other: Dual SIM support with dual standby mode

The Meizu MX5 is a smartphone designed and produced by the Chinese manufacturer Meizu, which runs on Flyme OS, Meizu's modified Android operating system. It is a previous phablet model of the MX series, succeeding the Meizu MX4 and preceding the Meizu MX6. It was unveiled on June 30, 2015 in Beijing.

== History ==
Rumors appeared in May 2015, which stated that the upcoming device would most likely feature a MediaTek Helio X10 System on a chip, a Full HD display and a 3100 mAh battery. Furthermore, it was mentioned that the new device will be announced in June.

On June 4, 2015, it was reported that the upcoming Meizu device was certified by the Chinese telecommunication authority TENAA, the Chinese equivalent to the American Federal Communications Commission. According to this specification, the device should feature 3 GB of RAM and a 5.5-inch Full HD screen.

=== Release ===
As announced, the MX5 was released in Beijing on June 30, 2015. Pre-orders for the MX5 began after the launch event on June 30, 2015. Sales in India began on August 26, 2015.

== Features ==
=== Flyme ===
The Meizu MX5 was released with an updated version of Flyme OS, a modified operating system based on Android Lollipop. It features an alternative, flat design and improved one-handed usability.

=== Hardware and design ===
The Meizu MX5 features a MediaTek Helio X10 system-on-a-chip with an array of eight ARM Cortex-A53 CPU cores, a PowerVR G6200 GPU and 3 GB of RAM. The MX5 reaches a score of 53,330 points on the AnTuTu benchmark and is therefore approximately 12% faster than its predecessor, the Meizu MX4.

The MX5 is available in four different color variants (grey body with black front, champagne gold body with white front and silver body with black or white front) and comes with 16 GB, 32 GB or 64 GB of internal storage.

Unlike its predecessor, the Meizu MX5 has a full-metal body, which measures 149.9 mm (5.90 in) x 74.7 mm (2.94 in) x 7.6 mm (0.30 in) and weighs 149 g (5.3 oz). It has a slate form factor, being rectangular with rounded corners and has only one central physical button at the front. Unlike most other Android smartphones, the MX5 doesn't have capacitive buttons nor on-screen buttons. The functionality of these keys is implemented using a technology called mBack, which makes use of gestures with the physical button. The MX5 further extends this button by a fingerprint sensor called mTouch.

The MX5 features a 5.5-inch AMOLED multi-touch capacitive touchscreen display with a FHD resolution of 1080 by 1920 pixels. The pixel density of the display is 403 ppi.

In addition to the touchscreen input and the front key, the device has volume/zoom control buttons and the power/lock button on the right side, a 3.5 mm TRS audio jack on the top and a microUSB (Micro-B type) port on the bottom for charging and connectivity.

The Meizu MX5 has two cameras. The rear camera has a resolution of 20.7 MP, a ƒ/2.2 aperture, a 6-element lens, laser-aided phase-detection autofocus and an LED flash. The front camera has a resolution of 5 MP, a ƒ/2.0 aperture and a 5-element lens.

== Reception ==
The MX5 received generally positive reviews.

Android Authority gave the MX5 a rating of 7.4 out of 10 possible points and mentioned that "the performance is smooth, the display is beautiful, the battery life is impressive, the camera is reliable, the fingerprint scanner is fantastic and the overall build quality is actually very nice".

Fonearena stated that "the Meizu MX5 is truly a flagship device, despite the low price" and concluded that the device "is highly recommended".

Android Headlines also reviewed the device and concluded that "[Meizu] did a great job yet again, and if you're looking for a flagship, and are unwilling to spend $600-800 on one, Meizu MX5 is a great alternative which can compete with the best of them". Furthermore, Android Headlines praised the battery life, responsive OS and laser-aided focus.

Digit.in gave the MX5 an overall rating of 76 out of 100 possible points and praised the high performance and good display.

== See also ==
- Meizu
- Meizu MX4
- Meizu MX6
