= One Glass Solution =

Touchscreen technology

One Glass Solution (OGS) is a touchscreen technology which reduces the thickness of a display by removing one of the layers of glass from the traditional capacitive touchscreen stack. The basic idea is to replace the touch module glass with a thin layer of insulating material. In general, there are two ways to achieve this.

One approach to OGS is called "sensor-on-lens” (also known as “touch-on-lens” or “sensor-on-glass”), with the "lens" in this case referring to the cover glass layer. Next, a layer of indium tin oxide (ITO) is deposited onto the back of the cover glass in a pattern to create electrodes to sense touch. A thin insulator layer is applied before a second ITO layer is deposited in a pattern creating electrodes running at right angles to the first layer. The assembly is then laminated onto a standard LCD panel.

The second approach is called "on-cell" capacitive touchscreen, with the cell referring to the LCD. In this process, a conductive layer of ITO is deposited directly onto the top layer of glass in the LCD panel in an electrode pattern. A thin insulating layer is applied before a second ITO layer is deposited in a pattern creating electrodes running at right angles to the first layer. Finally, a polarizing layer is applied on top, and the display is completed by adding the cover glass.

For now, it appears that the sensor-on-lens approach has advantages over on-cell solutions. The on-cell approach means that LCD makers would have to make two separate models of each panel: one with touch and one without. This could add cost to an industry that is already running on thin margins. The on-cell touch method is also limited to the size of the LCD panel, whereas sensor-on-lens modules can be larger than the underlying LCD panel, providing room for dedicated touch points that are found on many smartphone designs. Due to how sensor-on-lens modules are manufactured, the sensors are very fragile in comparison to on-cell modules. Damage to the cover glass will also impair the functionality of the touchscreen.

== Successor ==
Its successor is "in-cell" touch panels, where one of the conductive layers actually shares the same layer as the thin film transistors (TFTs) used to switch the display's sub-pixels on and off. (These transistors are fabricated directly on the semiconductor backplane of the display). The first products using "in-cell" touch technology have already (As of November 2012) appeared on the market, such as the Apple iPhone 5, XOLO 8X-1000, vivo X3S.
