= AnTuTu =

Software benchmarking tool

- Developer: Beijing Antutu Technology Company Limited
Stable release
- Android: 12.0.3 / 23 October 2026; 9 days ago
- iOS: 11.0.2 / 22 May 2026; 5 months ago
- Windows: 2.0.0.1192 / 20 March 2026; 7 months ago
- Linux: 1.0.0.591 / 17 November 2022; 3 years ago
- Operating system: Android, iOS, Windows, Linux
- Platform: ARM, x86, x86-64
- Available in: English, Simplified Chinese
- Type: Benchmark (computing)
- Website: www.antutu.com

AnTuTu (Chinese: 安兔兔; pinyin: ĀnTùTu) is a software benchmarking tool commonly used to benchmark smartphones and other devices. It is developed by Beijing Antutu Technology Company Limited and owned by Chinese company.

== Operations ==
The company developing the software is based in Chaoyang District, Beijing, and was cofounded by Chinese entrepreneurs Shào Yīng (邵英) and Liáng Bīn (梁斌). They started multi-platform development, releasing an x86 Linux version in May 2021 and a Windows version with ray tracing support in August 2021.

== Circumvention ==
The AnTuTu benchmark is so common that some hardware manufacturers have cheated on the benchmark, which made the benchmark unreliable. In response to cheating, AnTuTu created a new benchmark, called AnTuTu X, which made it more difficult for manufacturers to cheat on the benchmark.

Despite the changes introduced by AnTuTu X, cheating continued to be rampant; for instance, in 2021, AnTuTu delisted (and for three months, banned) the Realme GT after evidence was discovered that the phone was found to have used delay tactics in multithreading performance tests, as well as modifying the reference JPEG image for image processing tests.

== Versions ==
Version	Date	Characteristics
1	2011?	CPU performance, 2D / 3D graphics, SD read / write and Database IO.
2	2011?	Support for double core. New 3D benchmark that better shows game performance. New OpenGL based 2D benchmark.
3	26-11-2012	Support for four cores and new graphics chips. Support OpenGL ES 2.0 3D benchmark for 3D game performance test. New 2D Benchmark for 2D Game Performance test. Add compare page to compare scores with hot devices. Support x86 and MIPS platforms.
4	04-09-2013	Benchmark to User Experience (UX):MultiTask and Dalvik. Support for octa-core. Support OpenGL ES 3.0. New scene in 3DRating Benchmark. Improved classification of Memory and I/O.
5	28-08-2014	CPU single-threaded performance testing New engines graphic performance: 2D(Cocos2D) - 3D(Havok). New test for 64-bit CPU. New test HTML 5. Support for Android Runtime (ART). Update algorithm of total score. Unify criteria of Antutu X(prevent fraud and cheating).
6	03-12-2015	New designed 3D Testing Scenes based on Unity3D 5.0: Garden and Marooned. Add new UX testing items and increase UX testing proportion. New CPU Testing Added (based on the majority use of a single core). New Score Proportion. Cross-platform.
7	01-02-2018	New designed 3D test scenes: Refinery and Coastline. Support OpenGL ES 3.1 + AEP. Support Tessellation and Shadow. New UX tests that better reflect real-world use cases (Scroll, WebView and QR code). New score proportion. One tap to verify your device. In-depth device info about battery temperature, battery level, and CPU load changes.
8	17-10-2019	Introduces new Vulkan test scene-Terracotta Warriors. Updates all the test items in Memory test. Includes the display of hardware details in benchmark results page. Includes CPU architecture info in My device section. Fully supports Android Q. Fixed incorrect display of camera parameters on some multi-camera devices. Other improvements and optimizations.
9	22-03-2021	Introduces new Vulkan test scene-Swordsman. algorithm has been greatly adjusted in the CPU part Reasonably and accurately express the performance difference between the L1, L2, L3 Cache that comes with the SoC and the memory LPDDR Added HEIF picture decoding performance test Added H264, H265, VP9, AV1 video codec performance test function Other improvements and optimizations.
10	25-05-2023	Introduces new 3D test scenes based on Unreal Engine 4: Season and Coastline. Updates CPU testing to better reflect multi-core distribution performance. Enhances UX testing for real-world scenarios including video editing and high refresh rate display tests. Optimizes memory testing for LPDDR5X and UFS 4.0 storage devices.
11	15-01-2026	Introduces dedicated AI workload benchmarks, including local LLM inference testing. Updated GPU test scenes emphasizing Vulkan API performance and ray tracing. New storage testing algorithm designed for modern high-speed flash memory degradation. UX test adjustments for multi-window multitasking and foldable display layouts.
12	10-09-2026	Added Vulkan Cooperative Matrix compute test scenes for hardware-accelerated AI. New high-stress 3D graphics scenes with dynamic soft shadows and mesh shading. Updates memory benchmarks to evaluate 16KB page size kernel support and memory fragmentation. Comprehensive score algorithm rebalance for modern flagships.

== Notes ==
AnTuTu maintains rankings for devices by parameters (CPU, GPU, RAM, UX, total), SoC (only Android; by CPU and GPU), and AI performance (only Android).

AnTuTu (mainland China) maintains rankings for Android devices total (standard version and lite version), SoC total, SoC AI total, positive rating and Android device cost effectiveness (¥4000 and above, ¥3000-¥3999, ¥2000-¥2999, ¥1000-¥1999 and below ¥999). Device total and positive rating for both iPhone and iPad. Vehicle total and SoC total for vehicle head unit. Clicking on any device name does not give extra details, instead it links to jd.com for easy purchase.

Scores obtained on Android and iOS cannot be compared directly due to differences in operating systems: core architecture, different programming languages, and graphical APIs.
