= Xin =

Xin may refer to:

- Xin dynasty (新朝), which ruled China from 9–23 AD
- Xincan languages (ISO 639: xin), a small extinct family of Mesoamerican languages

== People ==
- Xin (surname), Chinese surname
- Empress Xin (Zhang Zuo's wife) (辛皇后; died c. 761), wife of the Chinese state Former Liang's ruler Zhang Zuo
- Noble Consort Xin (1737–1764), consort of the Qianlong Emperor
- Yue Xin (activist) (born 1996), Chinese student activist

== Philosophy ==
- Xin (heart-mind), 心
- Xin (virtue), 信, one of the Three Fundamental Bonds and Five Constant Virtues

== Places ==
- Xinjiang Uyghur Autonomous Region, abbreviated as Xin, the northwestern region of China
- Xin County, Xinyang, Henan, China
- Xin River, a tributary to Poyang Lake in Jiangxi Province

== Popular culture ==
- Xin (comics), a comic book by Kevin Lau, or its main character
- Xin, the "Ember Spirit", a character in Defense of the Ancients and Dota 2
- "Xin", an episode of The Good Doctor

== Other uses ==
- .xin, a top-level internet domain, operated by the Alibaba Group; see List of Internet top-level domains § Chinese
- Xīn (心) or Heart, a Chinese constellation

== See also ==
- Shin (disambiguation)
- Xing (disambiguation)
