= Xin River =

River in People's Republic of China

Xin
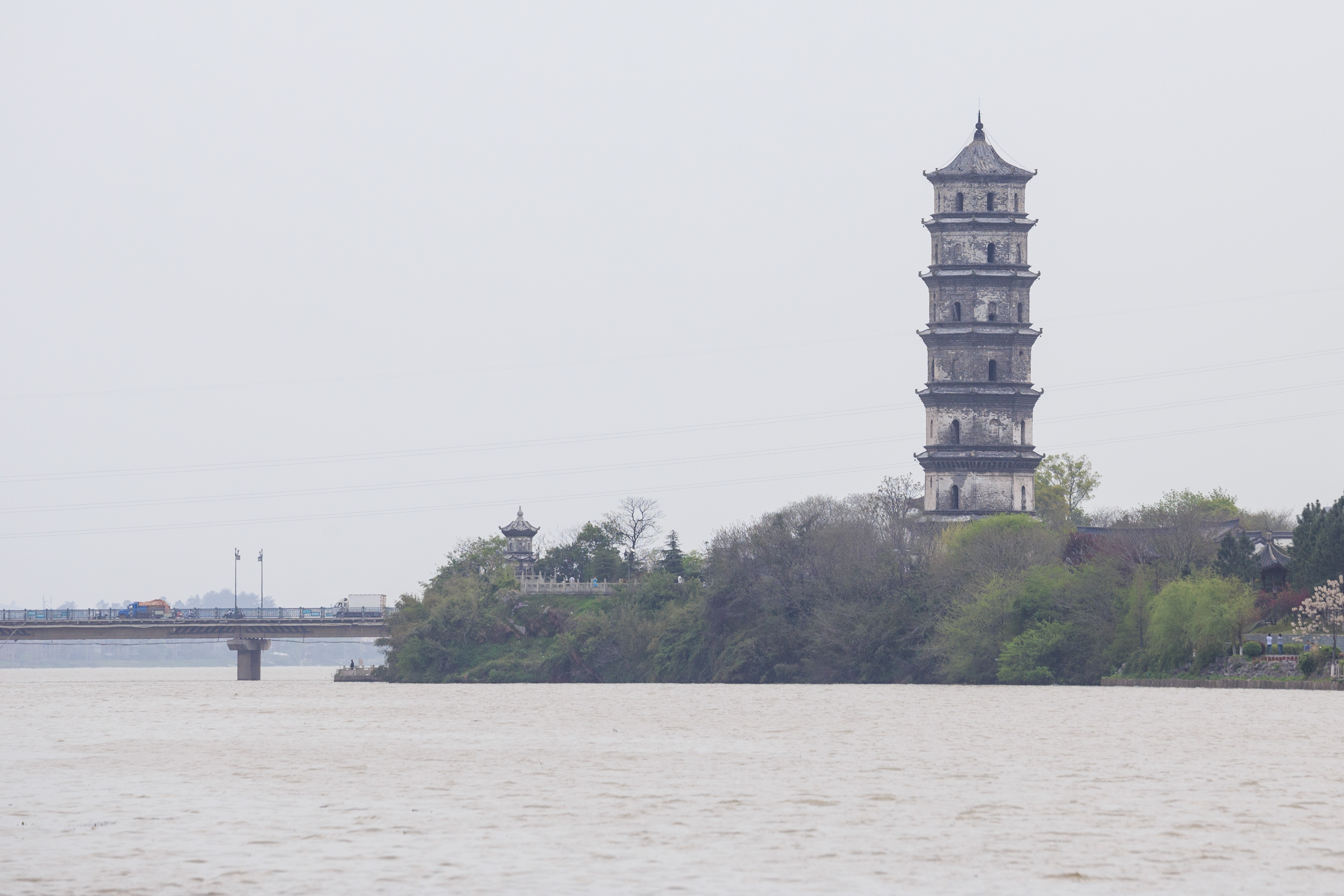
- Kuiwen Pagoda and Xin River in Shangrao
- Native name: 信江 (Chinese)

Location
- Country: China
- Region: Jiangxi Province
- City: Shangrao, Yingtan

Physical characteristics
- Source: Yushan River
  - location: Huaiyu Mountains, Sanqing, Yushan
  - coordinates: 28°59′N 118°05′E
- 2nd source: Feng River
  - location: Tongbo Mountain, Pucheng
- 3rd source
  - location: Xinzhou District, Shangrao
  - coordinates: 28°26′24″N 117°57′40″E
- Mouth
  - location: Yugan
  - coordinates: 28°36′40″N 116°40′35″E
- Length: 360.5 km (224.0 mi)
- Basin size: 17,600 km^{2} (6,800 sq mi)

Basin features
- River system: Yangtze River-Poyang Lake

The Xin River (Chinese: 信江; pinyin: Xīn Jiāng; Wade–Giles: Hsin Jiang) flows in Yushan County from the eastern edge of Jiangxi Province of central China into Poyang Lake. Some Wikipedia maps appear to call this the Xiao River.

== Geography ==
The headwaters at 28°59'N 118°05'E are in the Huai Shan mountains in the north and eastern boundaries of its watershed from which the river flows west. Tributaries include the Yu Ya River, Rao River North, Feng River, Stone River (Lu River), smaller mountain streams, the Ge River and the Baita River. The lower Xin River accepts the Le-an River which joins it as a tributary and both contribute water to Poyang Lake at 28°36'40"N 116°40'35"E and ultimately the Yangtze River. It is 360.5 km (580 miles) long and drains an area of 17,600 km^{2} (6,795 sq. mi.) with a heavy sediment load. The Xin River Basin is bounded by the Huaiyu Mountains to the north and east and by the Wuyi Shan to the south and east. Huanggang Shan is 2,158 m tall, the highest mountain in Jiangxi Province, on the southern edge of the basin. The mountain passes of Fenshui Guan and Fengling Guan are on the southeastern edge of the Xin River Basin. Shan (山) and guan (关) mean mountain and pass in Chinese, respectively.

The Xin River can be divided into upstream, midstream and downstream sections. The upper reaches of river are in mountainous, undulating terrain. The middle reaches of the river basin gradually reduce in slope as the river flows west. In the Poyang Lake area downstream the river enters a flat open alluvial plain. Likewise, 40% of the Xin River basin, in the east end, is mountainous and the rest of the area is hills (35%) and plains (25%).

== Climate ==
The Xin River Basin has a sub-tropical monsoon climate. Rainfall generally begins in April and gradually increases with some areas receiving up to 2000 mm or more annually. In July to September the weather is often controlled by a subtropical high, with local thunderstorms and rain, and eventually rain becomes scarce. The basin's average annual temperature in 18°C; annual average rainfall is 1845 mm with less in the eastern mountains than in the west.

== Economy ==
The area of Poyang Lake is a major rice growing area while wheat and tea are grown in the upper reaches of the Xin River. The Xin River basin has a human population of more than 4 million. About 83% of the arable land in the basin is used for paddy fields.

== Cities along the river ==
From its headwaters the Xin River flows south from the vicinity of the city of Yushan, east through or near towns of Shangrao, Yanshan, Yiyang, Guixi, and Yingtan, Yujiang, Yugan, and then northeast into Poyang Lake east of the city of Nanchang.

== Dams ==
The Xin River has three large reservoirs, the Jiepai Navigation and Hydropower Plant at Yingtan City and on its tributaries the Jin Shaxi Yushan Qiyi Reservoir, the largest of the Xin River Basin reservoirs, and the Luxi River Shangrao Da'ao Reservoir. A river diversion project has a flow of 19 cubic meters per second use to irrigate rice fields.

== Environmental protection ==
Local governments are working together to address significant environmental problems. The Xin River Basin has had industrial pollution including from the Kanayama Guixi Yongping Copper Mine as the largest source of pollution. In recent years, with the economic development of the basin, addressing the pollution of the river channel has become increasingly important. In 2005, Zhejiang Province ordered heavy polluters to clean up and worked with local officials providing incentives to resolve pollution issues. The enterprises of the watershed included mostly papermaking, metallurgy, chemical, and pharmaceutical companies, with the most serious hazardous chemicals being fluoride and fluorine. Many companies do not have sewage treatment facilities, so that sewage is discarded into the river without any treatment. In 2012, water pollution, low water levels, and human activities had been negatively impacting scaly-sided merganser, an endangered species which uses the river, although closure of a sand mine had had positive effects.

== Endangered species ==
Scaly-sided merganser, a species endemic to East Asia and listed as endangered by the IUCN, was first reported for Jiangxi Province in 1992, with a 2012 publication reports 3-32 birds in the winter of 2010-2011 in three sections of the Xin River.

== See also ==
- List of rivers in China
