= Cosun Group =

Cosun Group was incorporated in April 1992 as a traditional fixed-line telephone maker in China. Headquartered in Huizhou, the company has two US-listed arms: Qiao Xing Mobile Communication and Qiao Xing Universal Telephone, Inc. (Nasdaq: XING; NYSE: QXM).

In March 2002, Cosun Group spent CNY 316 million acquiring CECT.

In late 2016, the Cosun Group units Huizhou Cosun Telecommunication Industry Co. and Huizhou Cosun Telecommunications Industry Co. defaulted on corporate bonds scheduled to be repaid to investors. At the time, Cosun Group had been one of the top-500 Chinese companies for several years, with around 20 independent corporate entity subsidiaries. At the time, Cosun sold bonds through Zheshang Insurance, Zhao Cai Bao by Ant Financial Services Group, and the Guangdong Equity Exchange, and had bond issuance totals 1 billion yuan.

In January 2017, the phone maker Cosun Group defaulted on $166 million in bonds, "hitting investors who hadn't even bought the securities" in the investment marketplace. The Wall Street Journal described it as "one of the most high-profile failures to hit China's sprawling network of Internet-based financial firms."

Qiao Xing Mobile Communication was put into liquidation in the British Virgin Islands in 2015 by The Seiden Group, with local counsel at Applebys. It is currently being sold off on the China Beijing Equity Exchange ("CBEX") as per BVI court approval in 2019.
