= Sanqing =

Sanqing may refer to:

- Three Pure Ones, or Sanqing in Chinese, the three highest Taoist deities
- Mount Sanqing, mountain in Jiangxi, China
