= Xingzhou =

Xingzhou may refer to:

- Xing Prefecture (Hebei) (邢州), a prefecture between 6th and 13th centuries in modern Hebei, China
- Xing Prefecture (Shaanxi) (興州), a prefecture between 6th and 13th centuries in modern Shaanxi, China
- Xing Prefecture (Ningxia) (興州), a prefecture in 11th-century Western Xia in modern Ningxia, China
- Jinan Xingzhou F.C., a Chinese football club

== See also ==
- Singapore, a southeast Asian country sometimes called Xingzhou (星洲) in Chinese
- Seongju County, a county in North Gyeongsang Province, South Korea
- Xing (disambiguation)
