= CECT =

Chinese cellular phone brand

- Company type: Subsidiary of Shenzhen HuiTimes Technology
- Industry: Telecommunications
- Founded: 2004 (China)
- Headquarters: Shenzhen, Guangdong
- Products: Mobile phones Smartphones

CECT is one of the multiple brands of cellular phones manufactured in China. CECT offered unauthorized clones or replicas of the Apple Inc. iPhone and various Nokia cell phones manufactured in China and sold at a fraction of the price of the original. At least one reseller was subject to legal demands from Apple Inc. CECT also distributed Palm phones in China.

== iPhone clones ==
The CECT iPhone "clones" had been described as one of a growing number of MediaTek-powered iPhone clones. Two of the differences between the clones and the Apple iPhone are that the "clones" normally have smaller-resolution resistive touch screens (instead of capacitive) and dual SIM card slots. Newer models however, featured capacitive touch screens.

=== CECT ===
CECT is one of the largest China-based mobile phone manufacturers. While the origins of most of the phones listed below are unknown, they are believed to be produced by CECT. One of CECT's original phones was the CECT T689.

=== HiPhone ===
The HiPhone T32 is the only model in the Hiphone series to offer Wi-Fi. In a number of the clone models, the only difference is firmware versions. Not all HiPhones are labeled by the manufacturer; some are labeled only by the software version w006 or w009.

Please note the term "Sciphone" is often used to reference clone phones, because Sciphone is the manufacturer of the i68, i9, and more recently the i9+++.

- Hiphone P168
- Hiphone P168+
- Hiphone P168++
- Hiphone P168C
- Hiphone P168S
- Hiphone 4 (iPhone 4 clone)

==== Other ====
- Hiphone S688
- Hiphone T32
- Hiphone C-002 (also called Sciphone i32)
- Sciphone BB9B (the included battery, the back cover and the earphones are compatible with the i9 and the i68 models)
- Sciphone i68
- Sciphone i68+ (features a 1.3-megapixel camera, features a 3,5 headphone jack and the capacity to add up to 8 gigabytes of external storage)
- Sciphone i9+
- Sciphone i9+++ (Features WI-FI)
- Sciphone i999
- Sciphone i9 3GS+
- Sciphone 4G
- Sciphone KA08
- Ephone 4G
- Ephone 4GS
- J8
- AirPhone 4

==== A series ====
- Sciphone A88
- Sciphone A88+
- Sciphone A380i

==== N series ====
- Sciphone N19
- Sciphone N21 also known as X2 (a rebranded variant of General Mobile's DSTL1)
- Sciphone N12

== See also ==
- Meizu M8
