= Meizu MX =

Smartphone

- Manufacturer: Meizu
- Type: Touchscreen smartphone
- First released: China & Hong Kong only February 1, 2012; 14 years ago (First Dual-core model); June 30, 2012; 14 years ago (Quad-core model); July 14, 2012; 14 years ago (New Dual-core model)
- Predecessor: Meizu M9
- Successor: Meizu MX2
- Compatible networks: 2G GSM/GPRS/EDGE: 850, 900, 1800, 1900 MHz Class 12; 3G UMTS/HSPA+/W-CDMA: 850, 900, 1700, 1900, 2100 MHz; HSDPA: 21.6 Mbps; HSUPA: 5.76 Mbps
- Dimensions: 121.3 mm (4.78 in) H 63.3 mm (2.49 in) W 10.3 mm (0.41 in) D
- Weight: 139 g (4.9 oz)
- Operating system: Flyme OS, based on Android 2.3.5 Gingerbread upgradable to Android 4.1.2 Jellybean
- System-on-chip: Exynos 4 Dual 45 nm (First dual core model); Exynos 4 Quad 32 nm (Quad core model); Exynos 4 Dual 32 nm (new dual core model) or ARM Logic11 in Dual 32 nm (Texas Instruments in 4.1.2 jellybean mode)
- CPU: 1.4 GHz ARM Cortex-A9 or 1.2 GHz ARM Cortex-A9 + 400 MHz Logic11
- GPU: ARM Mali-400 MP (Quad-Core) or PowerVR SGX 540
- Memory: 1 GB DDR SDRAM
- Storage: 16 GB flash memory (Dual-core models); 32 or 64 GB flash memory (Quad-core model)
- Removable storage: Not supported
- Battery: 1600 mAh Li-Ion rechargeable battery, not replaceable (First dual core model); 1700 mAh Li-Ion rechargeable battery, not replaceable (New dual core model and Quad-core model) or 1800 mAh Rechargeable but not replaceable battery
- Rear camera: 8.0 MP, autofocus, LED flash, HD video recording
- Front camera: VGA resolution
- Display: 4.0 inch diagonal ASV; 640x960 px (288 ppi); 16M colours
- Connectivity: 3.5 mm TRS connector, Bluetooth 2.1 with A2DP and EDR, WiFi/WAPI (802.11 b/g/n), microUSB On-The-Go with MHL
- Data inputs: Multi-touch capacitive touchscreen, A-GPS, Accelerometer, Gyroscope, Proximity sensor, Digital compass, Ambient light sensor
- Other: microSIM only (adapter provided), Gorilla Glass display panel, active noise cancellation, no FM radio

The Meizu MX is a smartphone designed and produced by the Chinese manufacturer Meizu Technology, which runs on a modified Android operating system, dubbed as Flyme OS. It is the company's second Android-based smartphone, after the Meizu M9. The MX is Meizu's first smartphone to be released outside mainland China, as its launch also happened in Hong Kong at the same time, on January 1, 2012.

Since the development phase, Meizu announced that the MX would come in a dual-core and a quad-core model, the second being due to be released later than the first. This made Meizu the first company to announce a quad-core smartphone and, later, the first to announce an Exynos 4-based smartphone, beating the Samsung Galaxy S III in marketing time (even though the latter went on sale first).

The MX was the first Meizu phone to achieve extensive coverage on tech blogs and websites outside China because of its features comparable to the flagship phones of major mobile phone manufacturers. Thanks to the good reception, rumors stated the MX could arrive on Western markets.

== History ==
=== Design ===
The first rumors about a successor of the Meizu M9 leaked out in Q4 2010, even before M9's official launch itself, suggesting that a so-called M9II phone was in development, with a dual-core processor, 4-inch screen and 1 GB of RAM. Initially, this phone was supposed to look almost identical the M9, although with upgraded hardware, and some media thought it could have been a competitor in China to the iPhone 5, rumored to be in development, as happened with the Meizu M9.

In mid-April 2011 Meizu officially confirmed that the company was developing the phone, along with declaring that its name would be MX (M10, following the company's product name numeration). In this period the MX was attributed a Retina-like display resolution (1280×854 or 1200×900 pixels), which is not one of the production models' display.

The device's final design (Note: Initially, the MX design leaked from the Patent Office suggested a shape similar to that of the M9, but with a new back camera with and LED flash, a front camera and the SIM tray at the top. Nearer to the final launch new photos unveiled a new, rounded home button and two touch buttons with LEDs that rotate according to the phone's orientation.), price and release date (Note: The first announced release date was a vague "September 2011", then Meizu CEO delayed the date first to October 1 (Chinese National Day) and later to December. Most sources reported that both the dual-core and the quad-core models would be released at the same time, but the real announcement was referred only to the dual-core variant). were changed many times, as happened before with the M9.

=== Release ===
Pre-orders for the dual-core MX started on December 15, 2011, and granted a guarantee to receive the phone exactly on January 1, 2012, the day that official distribution started through the company's flagship stores (in China and Hong Kong). On launch day many customers waited for their turn outside the stores, forming queues (not as long as the ones for the M9 though); some reports claim that Meizu wanted to avoid attracting big crowds (for a matter of public order), so the customers who pre-ordered the devices were invited to arrive at the store only after receiving a phone confirmation. Even so, people started arriving the night before January 1.
Meizu assured that production and supplies would be able to meet customers' demand by 2012 Chinese New Year's Day (January 23), advising people to order the MX as soon as possible to receive it by that date. Meanwhile, the quad-core version was rumored to be going on sale around mid-2012 and on April 16, 2012, it was officially announced that it would start selling in June.

Meizu, in partnership with PCCW Mobile, held a launch party in Hong Kong on June 25, 2012, formalizing the release date of the MX 4-core: June 30. On that day many customers went to pick up their new phone at Meizu stores, resulting some cities running out of stock the same day.

On July 14 a new, improved dual-core model was released, replacing the old model in Meizu's product lineup. It features a 32 nm SoC, a bigger capacity battery and an improved Wi-Fi module.

== Features ==
=== Models ===
The Meizu MX is available in two variants, differing primarily for the system on a chip they use: one model uses an Exynos 4 Dual 32 nm with a dual-core 1.4 GHz ARM Cortex-A9 CPU, an ARM Mali 400 quad-core GPU and 1 GB of RAM, while the other model, named MX 4-core, uses the Exynos 4 Quad 32 nm with a quad-core 1.4 CPU (the other characteristics being equal). Meizu declares that the Exynos 4 Quad used by the MX 4-core model has a CPU 60% faster and a GPU 50% faster, compared to the previous model, while at the same time consuming 20% less battery. The dual-core model is equipped with a 16 GB flash memory for internal storage, while the quad-core model is available with either a 32 GB or a 64 GB memory.

The current dual-core model was preceded by another one, currently discontinued, which used a battery 100 mAh less powerful than the one mounted on the quad-core model, had a display with lower contrast and a Wi-Fi module with poorer reception. The present dual-core model has been updated with the corresponding components from the 4-core variant. (See the Launch and sale section for further information)

=== Hardware and design ===
The Meizu MX has a plastic body with a Gorilla Glass display cover; it measures 121.3 mm (4.78 in) x 63.3 mm (2.49 in) x 10.3 mm (0.41 in) and weighs 139 g (4.9 oz). It has a classic candybar shape, being rectangular with rounded corners, and presents only one central physical button at the front, like many modern touchscreen smartphones. The MX features also two situation aware capacitive keys (which are also haptic enabled), a technology patented by Meizu; these soft keys have different functions based on the device's orientation and functions.

The front of the phone, including the key and the metal border around it, is completely black, and so is the internal chassis, while the back cover is available in five different colors (pure white, ivory white, misty pink, lilac purple and milky lime). These covers are made from double-layer plastics: the bottom one is colored and the top one is transparent, giving the back a glossy finish, similarly to other smartphones like the Samsung Galaxy S III and the Huawei Honor.

The MX features a 4-inch diagonal, 960×640 pixel (DVGA resolution) ASV multi-touch capacitive touchscreen display, with an aspect ratio of 3:2, supporting up to 16 million colors and with a pixel density of 288 ppi.

In addition to the touchscreen input and the front keys, the device has a volume/zoom control on the right side and the power/lock button on the top. The MX doesn't have a camera shutter key, but it is possible to capture a photo using the volume key or by swiping a finger on the proximity sensor (via a software update).

The Meizu MX has a VGA front-facing camera and an 8.0 MP camera on the back. The main camera has a backside illuminated CMOS sensor with autofocus; the optics have an aperture of f/2.2 and the macro focus is capable of clearly capturing objects as close as 5–10 cm. The software settings includes support for geotagging, smile detection, panorama mode and wide dynamic range.

== Reception ==
The MX4 received generally positive reviews.

Engadget gave the MX a score of 74 out of 100 possible points and praised the sharp display, great audio quality and good build quality.

== See also ==
- Meizu
- Meizu M8
- Meizu M9
- Meizu MX3
