= Meizu M9 =

Chinese smartphone

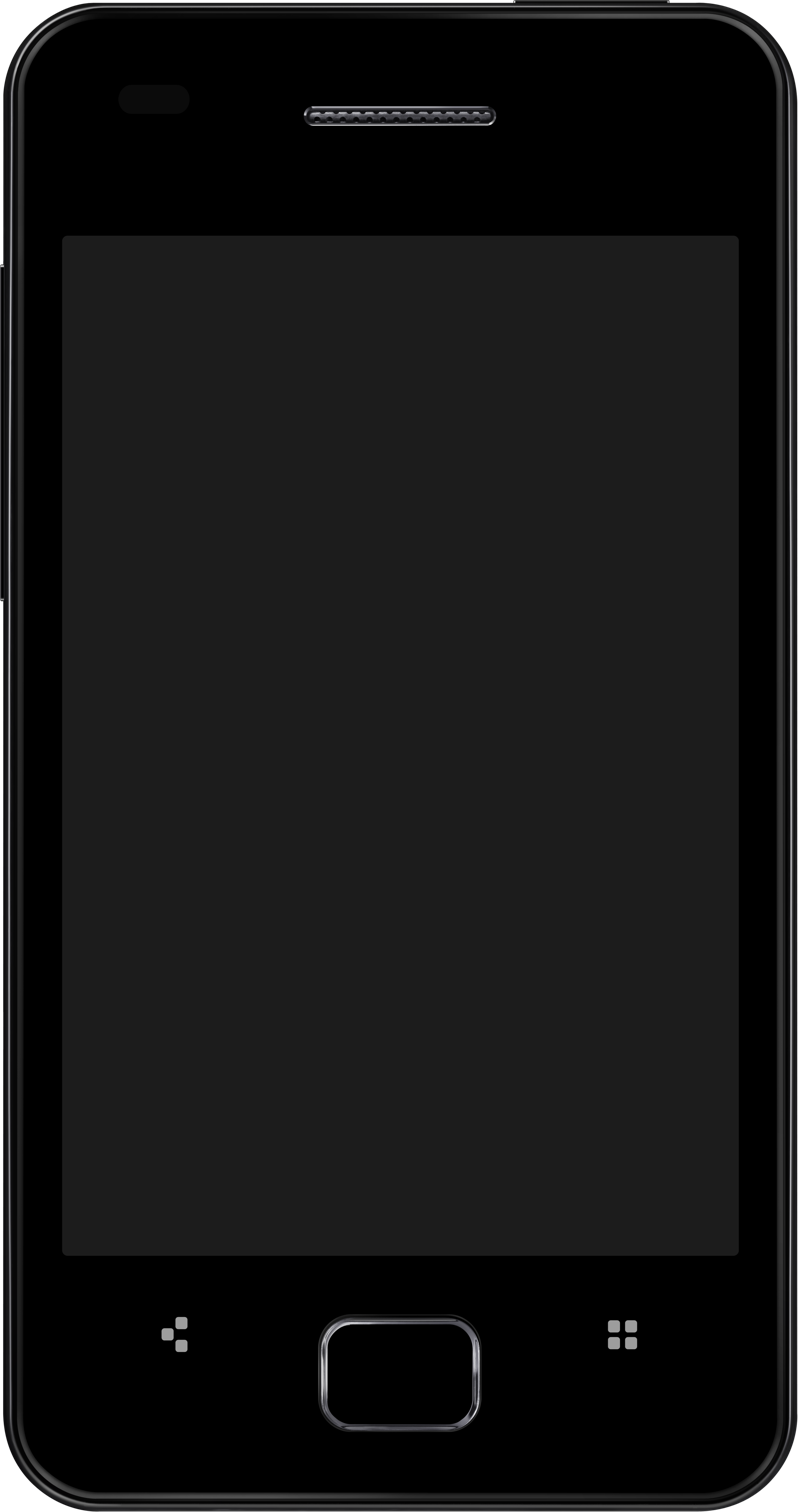
- Manufacturer: Meizu
- Type: Touchscreen smartphone
- Predecessor: Meizu M8
- Successor: Meizu MX
- Compatible networks: (GSM/GPRS/EDGE): 900 and 1,800 MHz; UMTS: 2,100 MHz; HSPA+: 21 Mbit/s; HSUPA: 5.76 Mbit/s
- Dimensions: 113.0 mm (4.45 in) H 59.8 mm (2.35 in) W 11.2 mm (0.44 in) D
- Weight: 123 g (4.3 oz)
- Operating system: Android 2.3.5 (Gingerbread); Android 4.0.3 (Flyme OS 1.1.5)
- CPU: Samsung Hummingbird S5PC110 (ARM Cortex A8), 1 GHz
- GPU: PowerVR SGX 540
- Memory: 512 MB RAM
- Storage: 8 & 16 GB (NAND flash memory)
- Removable storage: microSD (up to 128 GB)
- Battery: Li-ion 1.37 Ah
- Rear camera: 5 megapixel; 720p HD video;
- Display: 3.54 in (90 mm) 960x640 px
- Connectivity: Wi-Fi (802.11a/b/g/n); Wi-Fi Direct; Bluetooth 2.1+EDR;
- Data inputs: Multi-touch touch screen

The Meizu M9 (pronounced MAY-zoo M9) is a Chinese smartphone designed and promoted by the Meizu Technology Co., Ltd. which runs on Flyme OS. It was launched on January 1, 2011, resulting in buyers lining up overnight to enter stores to purchase the device.

== History ==
Jack Wong, at that time the CEO of Meizu, announced that the Meizu M9 would be released in late 2010. Only 300 copies of the phone were released on the first day of the phone's launch. It was only available in December 2010 if it was pre-ordered in October. The price of the Meizu M9 was set for 2,380 Yuan (350 dollars). The phone was originally slated for release in early November. Because of several delays, the phone's release date was delayed to late December. One of the delays in the release of the phone was the company's decision to brand the phone with an ancient Chinese character for a logo. Another delay was caused by the validation process of the phone by the China Academy of Telecommunication Research. The validation process took two months. Another delay was caused by the arrival of the IPhone 4 to China. Because Meizu Technology Co., ltd wanted to compete with Apple, the company had to use the same retina screen as the iPhone 4.

== Specifications ==
=== Internal hardware ===
The Meizu M9 features "Hummingbird" (S5PC110) SoC with 1 GHz ARM Cortex-A8 CPU and PowerVR 540 GPU along with 512 MB RAM, 8–16 GB internal flash memory, a 5-megapixel rear-facing camera and a 3.54-inch capacitive touchscreen display with 640x960 pixels resolution. The display resolution surpasses the resolution of previous Meizu M-series smartphones. The phone also has Bluetooth, Wi-Fi, and TV-out (HDMI 1.3) connectivity options. The Samsung S5PC110 SoC allows the Meizu M9 to play Full HD video.

The Meizu M9 is similar to the iPhone 4 in a number of ways. They both have similar CPUs which are ARM Cortex A8-based; however, the Meizu M9 has the Samsung S5PC1110 SoC while the iPhone 4 has the Apple A4 SoC. Even the clock speed and phone internals are similar between the Meizu M9 and the Apple iPhone 4.

==== Display ====
The Meizu M9 uses a 3.54 inch Sharp AVS display with a 640x960 pixels resolution. This offers a pixel density of 326 ppi, a substantial improvement over most Android phones and a pixel density identical to that of the Apple iPhone 4. Because of the improved pixel density, text in zoomed-out views of the web browser or other applications can be read, and graphics such as those of games appear sharper.

=== Android operating system and Meizu software ===
The Meizu M9 runs on Android 2.2, with an upgrade to 2.3 afterwards. With Android 2.2, there is some lag but that is fixed with the new 2.3 update with performance updates. The interface is designed by Eico. Eico is a Chinese design firm that has a good reputation because of its good work with Google, ASUS and Creative. Eico have designed a unique user interface for the Meizu M9. A lot of people that have HTC cell phones have started importing the Meizu M9 interface into their cell phones because of its layout. The Meizu also has its own apps that have been designed by Eic which are designed to work well with the interface. There is also an English version of the phone's software.

The Flyme OS from the new MX device was backported to M9 with a few features disabled; bringing Android 4.0 support, increased performance and a new UI.

== Usability ==
Meizu M9 has three physical buttons below the screen. The middle button is the "HOME" button; the "BACK" button is on the left and the "KEY" button on the right. On the top of the phone is the "LOCK SCREEN" key and on the left side is the "VOLUME" key. Meizu M9 does not have a physical button on the sides for taking pictures which leaves the right side of the phone without push buttons. The Meizu M9 screen will appear with 3 icons on its lockscreen after turning on the phone. There is a "LOCK" icon in the middle which opens the Home screen, a "PHONE" icon on the left, and a "SMS" icon (for text messages) on the right. These icons can be activated by dragging them upwards.

=== Phone calls ===
After dragging the phone icon up to unlock the phone, a dial pad will appear; this gives the user both the flexibility to dial and access contacts. After dialing one can choose to put the call on speaker, mute, hold, and record, check contacts list or end the call by pressing the orange box at the bottom. All this commands appear on the screen during the time of the phone call.

=== Text ===
To write a text message first press the "TYPE TO COMPOSE" button and the keyboard will appear. The main difference with Meizu M9 from most smartphones like iPhones is that the keyboard does not rotate to landscape mode when the phone is reoriented. Also it can easily switch from Chinese to English and vice versa simply by pushing the "EN" and "CH" buttons respectively.

=== Internet browsing ===
Upon pushing the "Home" button on the middle of the screen, the user is immediately connected to the default homepage of the Meizu web browser. The top left button on the screen allows the opening of more than one internet page at the same time. Also at the bottom of the page there are three icons: on the left is the "Refresh" icon on the middle "Bookmark" button and on the right is the "More Options" icon, which allows the user to download list, add to desktop, select text etc. The screen can scroll up, down, left, right and also zoom in and out with just the touch of the finger making it easier to read.

== Criticism ==
=== Functionality ===
The Meizu M9 uses a 5MP front-illuminated digital camera sensor which has poor low-light capability.

The sound quality is known to be quite cacophonic, especially when the volume is increased to its maximum. Critics have stated that the storage ROM for the phone isn't stable enough for full customer reliability.

=== Battery life ===
The battery life span of the Meizu M9 is comparable to that of most modern smartphones. When fully charged, it can last up to a day with normal usage, and it can last up to two days with minimal usage. There is speculation that the Android 2.3 update will improve the Meizu M9's battery life.

With the Android 2.3 beta firmware, battery life can last up to two days with normal usage and three days with minimal usage. These durations are expected to be higher for the final firmware version.

=== Marketability ===
The best way to purchase this phone is to get it from an online seller in China, with the downside to this being that a warranty is not always available and that the sellers may be unreliable.

The Meizu M9 was reported to have already hit its total sales target for 2011 in the first quarter. Consequently, the CEO Jack Wong refused to reduce the price of the phone. Its success could be as a result of low project target sales or unexpected popularity of the product. This phone is highly popular in China, and is starting to gain worldwide attention.

== See also ==
- Meizu
- Meizu M8
- Meizu MX
- Galaxy Nexus
