= Qiao Xing =

Chinese phone manufacturer

A Qiaoxing brand phone made in Huizhou

Qiao Xing (Chinese: 侨兴; pinyin: Qiáo Xīng) is the first Chinese telephone manufacturer listed on the NASDAQ. It is the American arm of Cosun Group.

== History ==
Cosun Group was incorporated in April 1992 as a traditional fixed-line telephone maker in China. Headquartered in Huizhou, the company has two US-listed arms: Qiao Xing Mobile Communication and Qiao Xing Universal Telephone, Inc. (Nasdaq: XING).

In March 2002, Cosun Group spent CNY 316 million acquiring CECT.
