= Yushan County =

Yushan 玉山县
- County
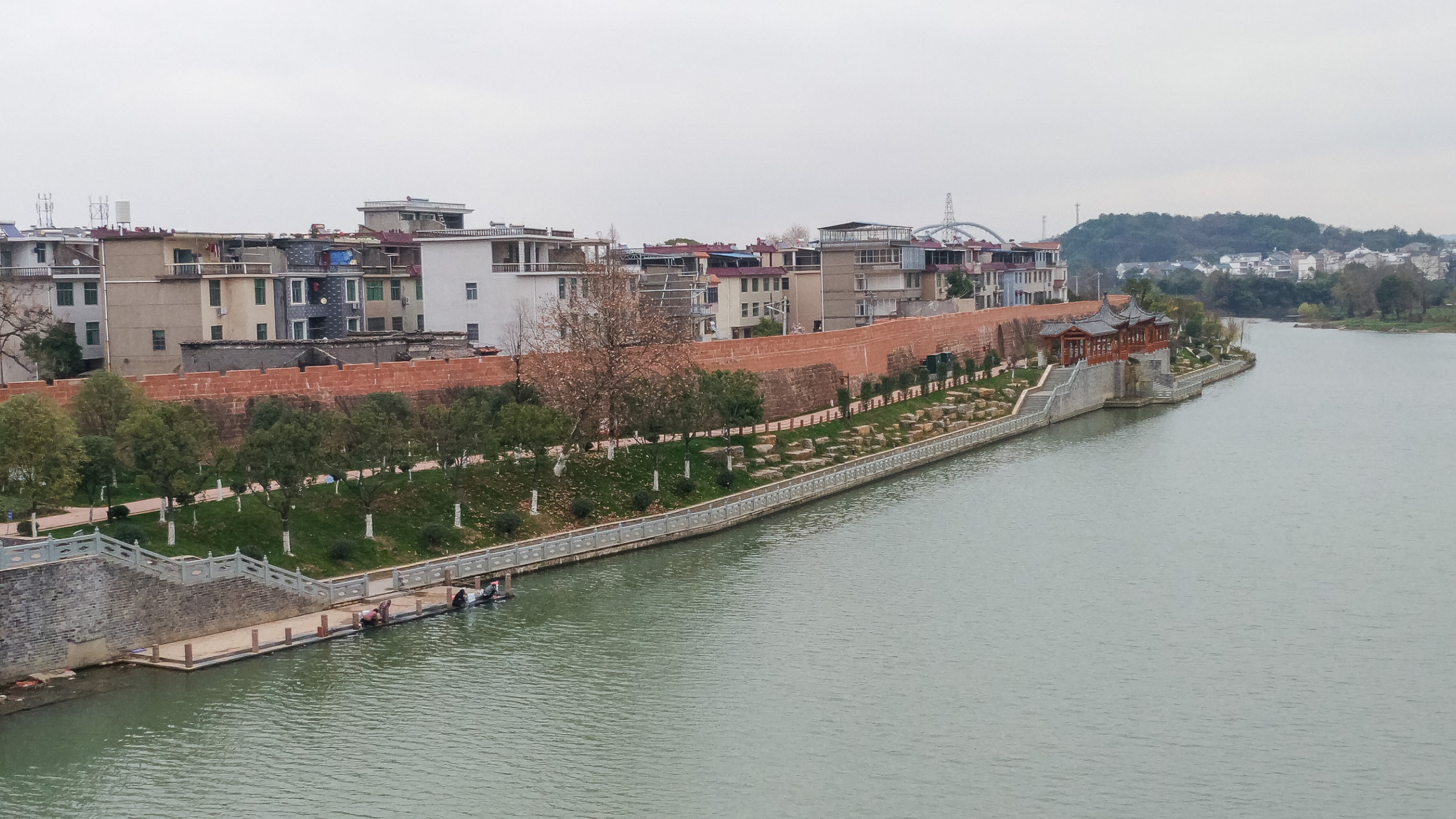

- Location in Jiangxi
- Country: People's Republic of China
- Province: Jiangxi
- Prefecture-level city: Shangrao
- Seat: Bingxi town

Area
  - Total: 1,728 km^{2} (667 sq mi)

Population (2018)
  - Total: 594,800
  - Density: 344.2/km^{2} (891.5/sq mi)
- Time zone: UTC+08:00 (China Standard)
- Postal code: 334700
- Area code: 0793
- Vehicle registration: 赣E
- Website: www.zgys.gov.cn

Yushan (Chinese: 玉山; pinyin: Yùshān; lit. 'Jade Mountain') is a county in the northeast of Jiangxi province, China. The county is Jiangxi's gateway to bordering Zhejiang province. It covers 1,731 km^{2} (668 sq mi) and the population now reaches 560,000.

The climate is temperate there with abundant rainfall in the monsoon season, and has clearly differentiated summers and winters.

== Administration ==
Yushan has been a county for over 1,300 years. Administratively the county is part of the prefecture-level city Shangrao. The county administers 21 townships.

At present, Yushan County has 1 subdistrict, 11 towns and 6 townships.

1 subdistrict

- Fenglin (枫林街道)

11 towns

- Bingxi (冰溪镇)
- Linhu (临湖镇)
- Bimu (必姆镇)
- Hengjie (横街镇)
- Wencheng (文成镇)
- Xiazhen (下镇镇)
- Yanrui (岩瑞镇)
- Shuangming (双明镇)
- Zihu (紫湖镇)
- Xianyan (仙岩镇)
- Zhangcun (樟村镇)

6 townships

- Nanshan (南山乡)
- Huaiyu (怀玉乡)
- Xiatang (下塘乡)
- Siguqiao (四股桥乡)
- Liudu (六都乡)
- Sanqing (三清乡)

== Climate ==
Climate data for Yushan, elevation 116 m (381 ft), (1991–2020 normals, extremes 1981–present)
Month	Jan	Feb	Mar	Apr	May	Jun	Jul	Aug	Sep	Oct	Nov	Dec	Year
Record high °C (°F)	26.0 (78.8)	28.4 (83.1)	34.2 (93.6)	34.9 (94.8)	36.3 (97.3)	37.4 (99.3)	40.9 (105.6)	41.0 (105.8)	39.1 (102.4)	37.5 (99.5)	31.8 (89.2)	24.5 (76.1)	41.0 (105.8)
Mean daily maximum °C (°F)	10.4 (50.7)	13.1 (55.6)	17.0 (62.6)	23.2 (73.8)	27.7 (81.9)	29.8 (85.6)	34.2 (93.6)	33.9 (93.0)	30.2 (86.4)	25.2 (77.4)	19.2 (66.6)	13.1 (55.6)	23.1 (73.6)
Daily mean °C (°F)	6.1 (43.0)	8.4 (47.1)	12.2 (54.0)	17.9 (64.2)	22.6 (72.7)	25.4 (77.7)	29.2 (84.6)	28.7 (83.7)	25.1 (77.2)	20.0 (68.0)	14.0 (57.2)	8.2 (46.8)	18.2 (64.7)
Mean daily minimum °C (°F)	3.1 (37.6)	5.1 (41.2)	8.6 (47.5)	14.0 (57.2)	18.8 (65.8)	22.2 (72.0)	25.2 (77.4)	24.9 (76.8)	21.4 (70.5)	16.0 (60.8)	10.2 (50.4)	4.6 (40.3)	14.5 (58.1)
Record low °C (°F)	−6.0 (21.2)	−4.6 (23.7)	−2.7 (27.1)	2.9 (37.2)	9.9 (49.8)	13.6 (56.5)	18.8 (65.8)	18.6 (65.5)	12.9 (55.2)	4.1 (39.4)	−2.1 (28.2)	−9.5 (14.9)	−9.5 (14.9)
Average precipitation mm (inches)	95.4 (3.76)	113.3 (4.46)	210.1 (8.27)	236.9 (9.33)	235.9 (9.29)	408.9 (16.10)	171.8 (6.76)	128.9 (5.07)	79.0 (3.11)	49.9 (1.96)	98.7 (3.89)	76.2 (3.00)	1,905 (75)
Average precipitation days (≥ 0.1 mm)	13.6	13.7	18.2	17.0	16.3	18.0	11.3	12.5	8.8	7.7	10.6	11.0	158.7
Average snowy days	2.6	1.8	0.4	0	0	0	0	0	0	0	0.2	0.8	5.8
Average relative humidity (%)	78	77	78	77	77	82	75	75	75	73	77	76	77
Mean monthly sunshine hours	83.4	84.5	94.5	117.2	133.8	119.1	220.0	208.6	171.8	160.7	125.9	114.7	1,634.2
Percentage possible sunshine	26	27	25	30	32	29	52	52	47	46	39	36	37
Source: China Meteorological Administration

== Economy ==
Over the last fifty years, the county has harnessed its eight major rivers for power. It has three large hydropower stations with installed capacity of about 1.2 megawatts.

The county is relatively a lagger in economic development. But it boasts affluent mining resources, like flagstones and limestones.

== Transportation ==
Yushan is a stop on the Zhe-Gan Railway, leading from Shanghai, Hangzhou to Nanchang and further south to Guangzhou and Hong Kong. At the end of 2002, the county was also incorporated into the national network of roads with the construction of a highway to Shanghai. Its closest airport is one in Quzhou, which flies to various domestic destinations.

== Sights ==
Every year, tens of thousands of domestic and foreign tourists flock to Yushan's picturesque Mount Sanqing (三清山), which has been officially designated as a National Scenic Area.

Huaiyu Mountains are also a tourist attraction. In the Song dynasty, the great neo-Confucianist Zhu Xi taught there. In Republican times, the area also hosted a guerrilla affiliated to the Chinese Communist Party, led by then legendary general Fang Zhimin.

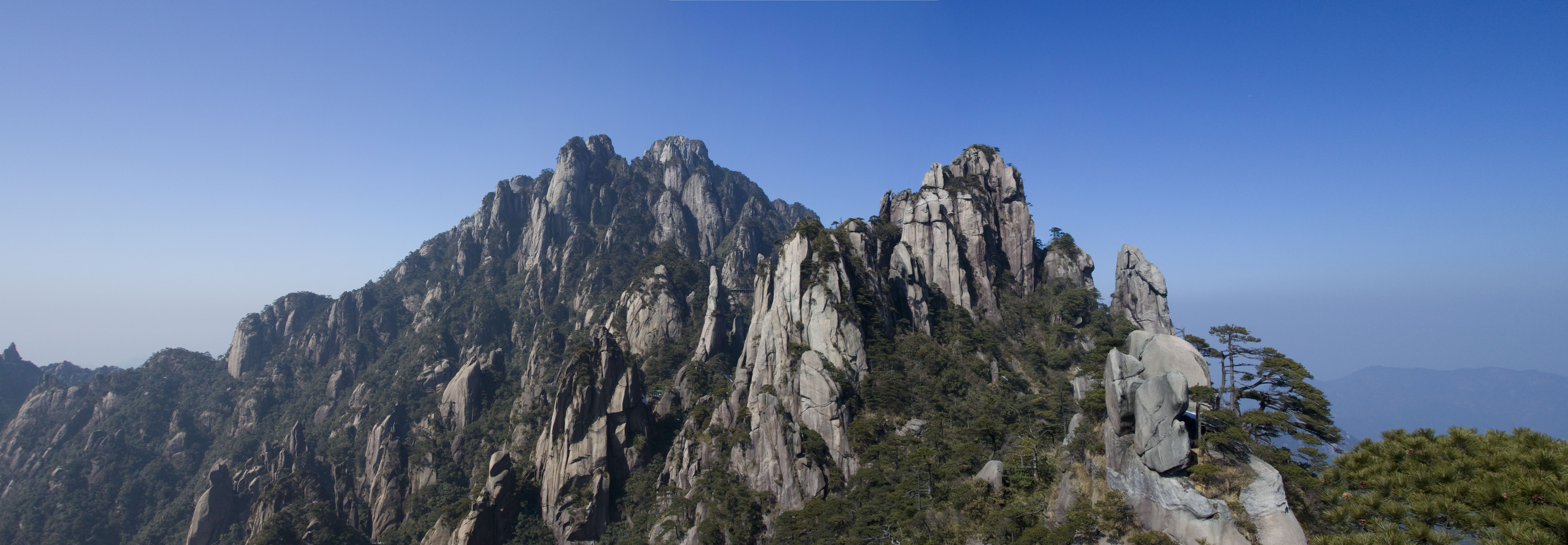
UNESCO World Heritage Site: Mount Sanqing
