= Mount Sanqing =

Mountain range in Jiangxi, China

Sanqingshan National Geopark
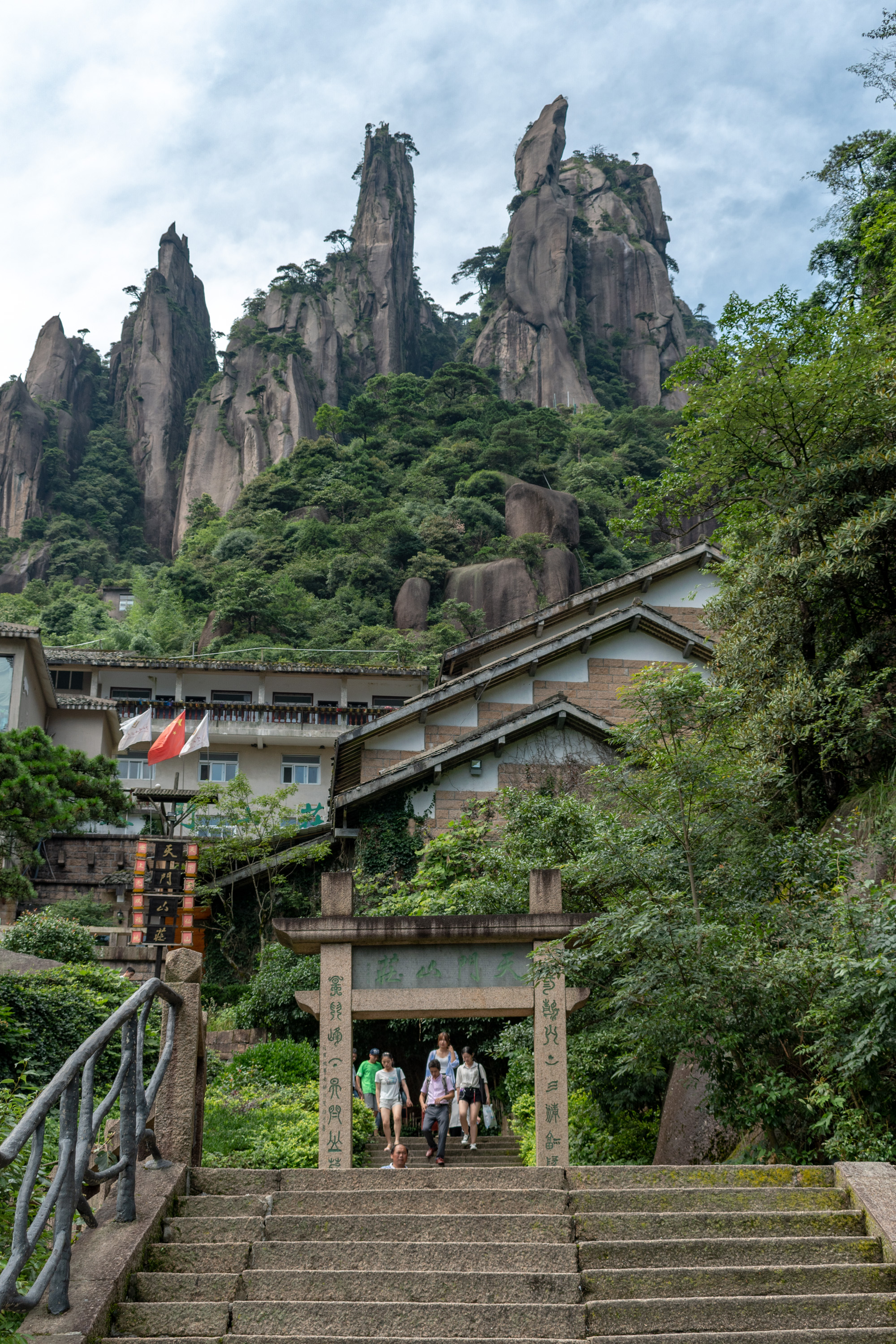

- Location within China
- Location: Jiangxi, China
- Nearest city: Shangrao
- Coordinates: 28°54′57″N 118°3′52″E
- Area: 229.5 km^{2} (88.6 sq mi)
- Established: 2005

UNESCO World Heritage Site
- Official name: Mount Sanqingshan National Park
- Criteria: Natural: (vii)
- Reference: 1292
- Inscription: 2008 (32nd Session)
- Area: 22,950 ha (56,700 acres)
- Buffer zone: 16,850 ha (41,600 acres)

Mount Sanqing (Chinese: 三清山; pinyin: Sānqīng Shān) is a renowned Taoist sacred mountain located 40 kilometres (25 mi) north of Yushan County in Jiangxi Province. Sanqing means the "Three Pure Ones" in Chinese as Mount Sanqing is made up of three main summits: Yujing, Yushui, and Yuhua, representing the Taoist trinity.

A Chinese phrase “三峰峻拔、如三清列坐其巅” ("Three steep peaks, like the Three Pure Ones sit the summits") explains why it was named San Qing. Amongst the three hills, the Yujing hill (1817 meters above sea level) is the highest.

Mount Sanqing is the highest of the Huaiyu Mountains and is known for its outstanding scenery and unique geological formations. The area became a National Geopark in 2005, and a UNESCO World Heritage Site in 2008. It is a famous tourist destination as well as a refuge for animals and plants. The national park contains more than 2,300 species of plants and 400 species of vertebrates. The total area of Mount Sanqing is 229 km^{2}.

== Geological History and Hydrology ==
Mount Sanqing is a granite mountain that forms a part of a crustal suture zone dating back to the Neoproterozoic Era, roughly 850 million years ago. However, the granite making up much of the mountain peaks dates from the Mesozoic. Faulting, weathering and erosion have shaped the mountains into intricate landforms. On Mount Sanqing, there are more than 23 gorges with more than 500 meters of elevation. The abundant yearly rainfall in the region allows for many waterfalls (some of which are over 60 meters in height), pools, and springs in the region.

== Biodiversity ==
Located in a humid subtropical climate zone, Mount Sanqing and the surrounding national park is relatively biodiverse. Over 2,300 plant and 400 vertebrate species have been described within the park boundaries, some of which are threatened with extinction.

=== Flora ===
There are many vegetation types in Mount Sanqing, including evergreen broad-leaved forests, warm temperate coniferous forests, warm temperate needle and broad-leaved mixed forests, bamboo forests, temperate needle and broad-leaved mixed forests, evergreen and deciduous broad-leaved mixed forests, coppice forests, and mountain top meadow coppice forests. This, coupled with the isolated topography of the region and its status as an Ice-Age refugium, has allowed high rates of floral biodiversity and endemism. Mount Sanqing protects many conifer species in particular, including rare varieties of Pseudotsuga sinensis var. gaussenii and Tsuga spp. 19 of the plants found in the park were listed on the IUCN Red List as of 2003.

=== Fauna ===
Because of the large elevational gradients on and around the mountain and the corresponding variation in habitat, the fauna of the region display clear niche differentiation along the mountainside. 61 mammal, 226 bird, 49 reptile, 23 amphibian, 36 fish, and 1327 insect species have been found within the park. 37 of these species are endemic to China, including the Tibetan macaque, Chinese hare, Yellow bittern, Cabot's tragopan, Yellow-bellied tit, and Chinese fire belly newt. Like much of Southern China, the mountain is rich in gallinaceous birds. It also protect a wide diversity of butterfly species. The critically-endangered Blue-crowned laughingthrush, of which fewer than 200 individuals likely remain, has been sighted in the park. Leopards, pangolins, and serow are common in the park.

== Gallery ==
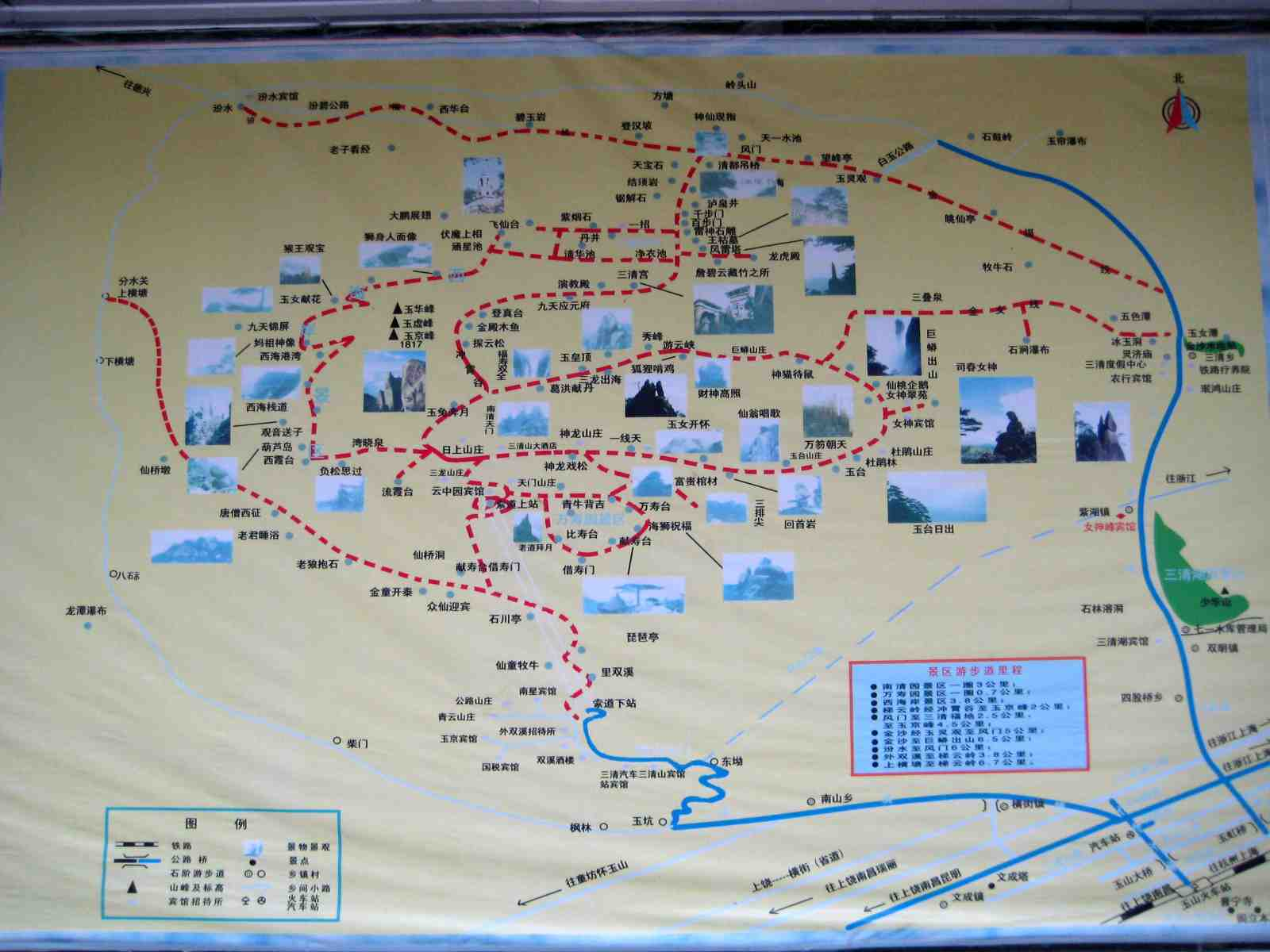
Map of the site

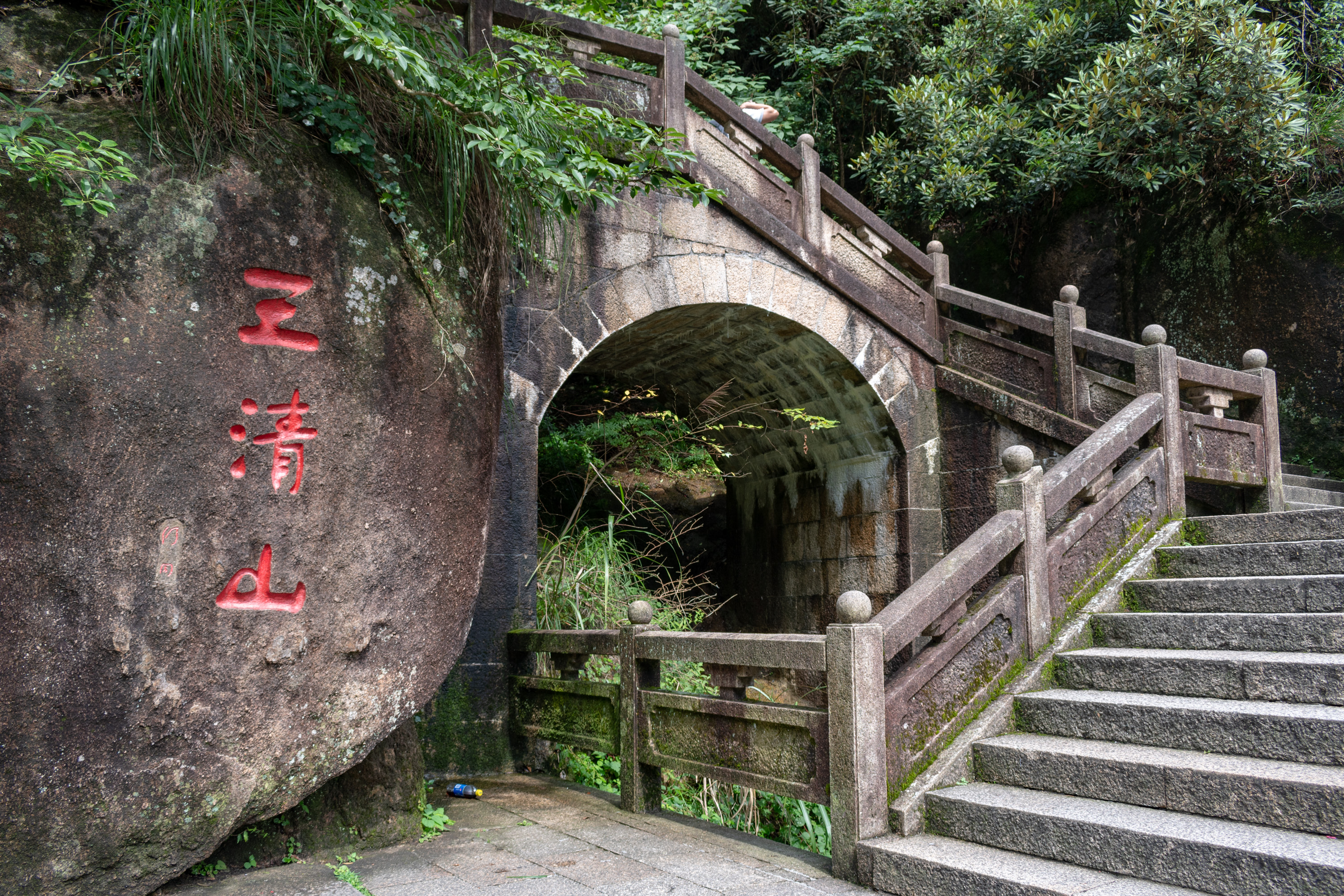

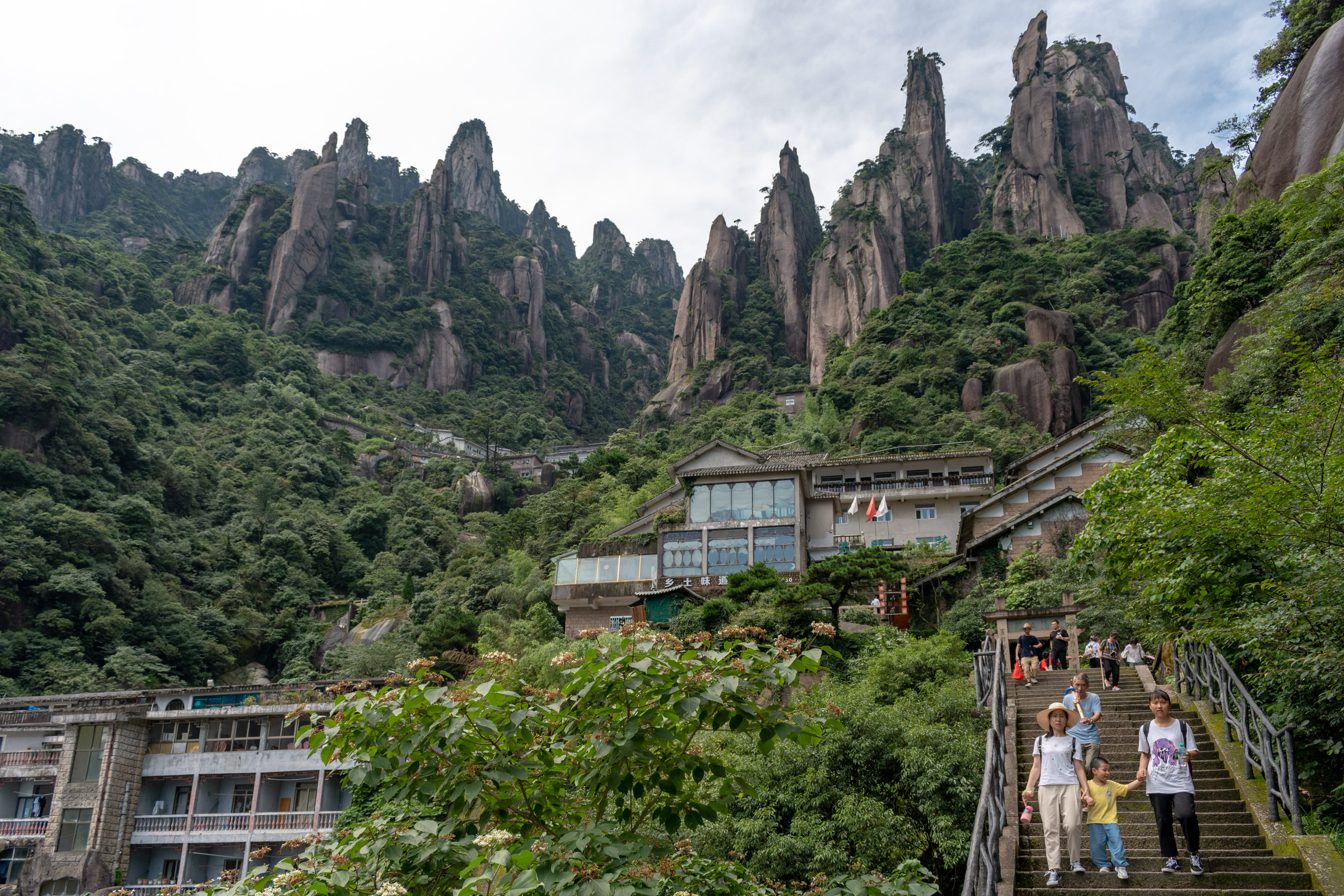

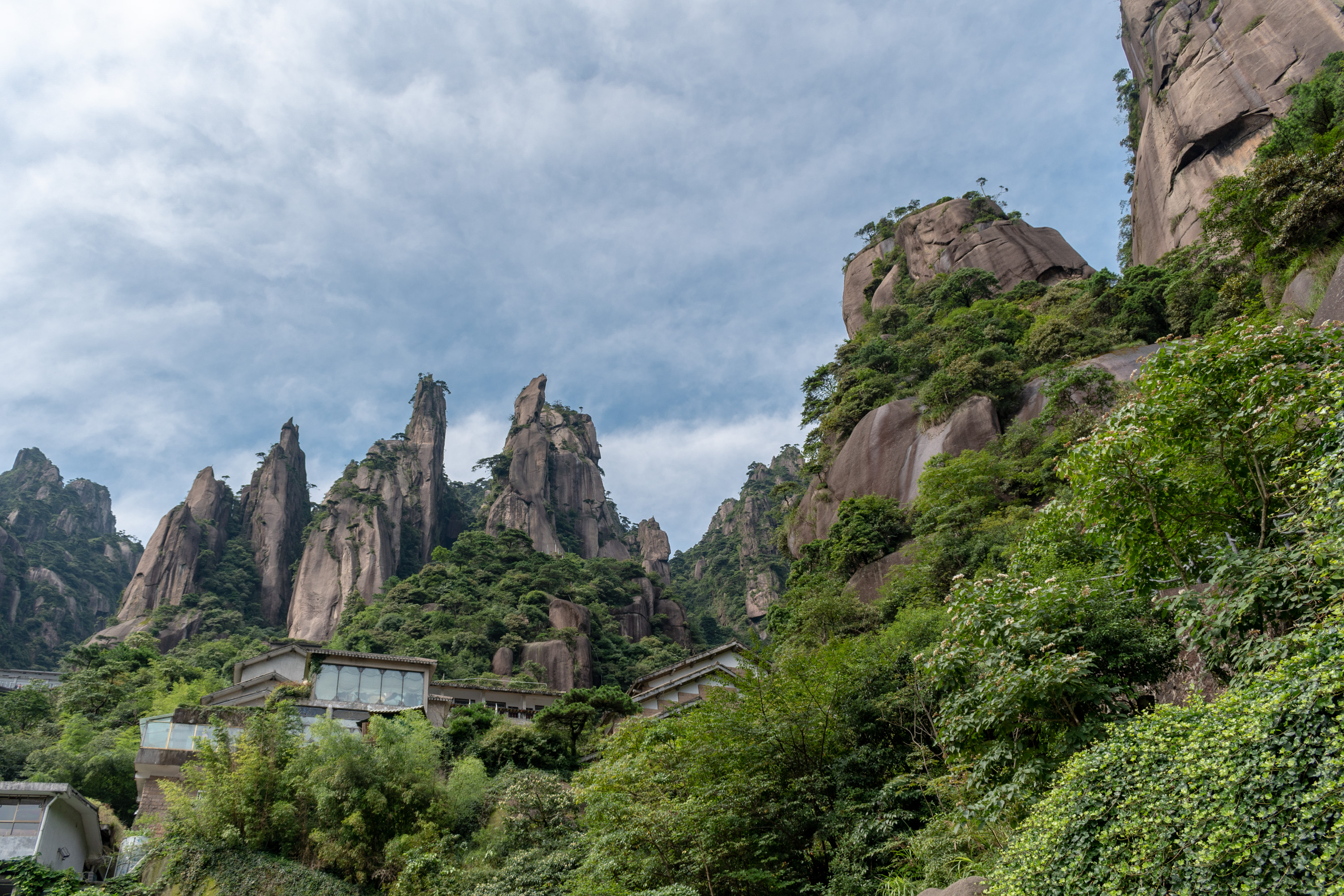

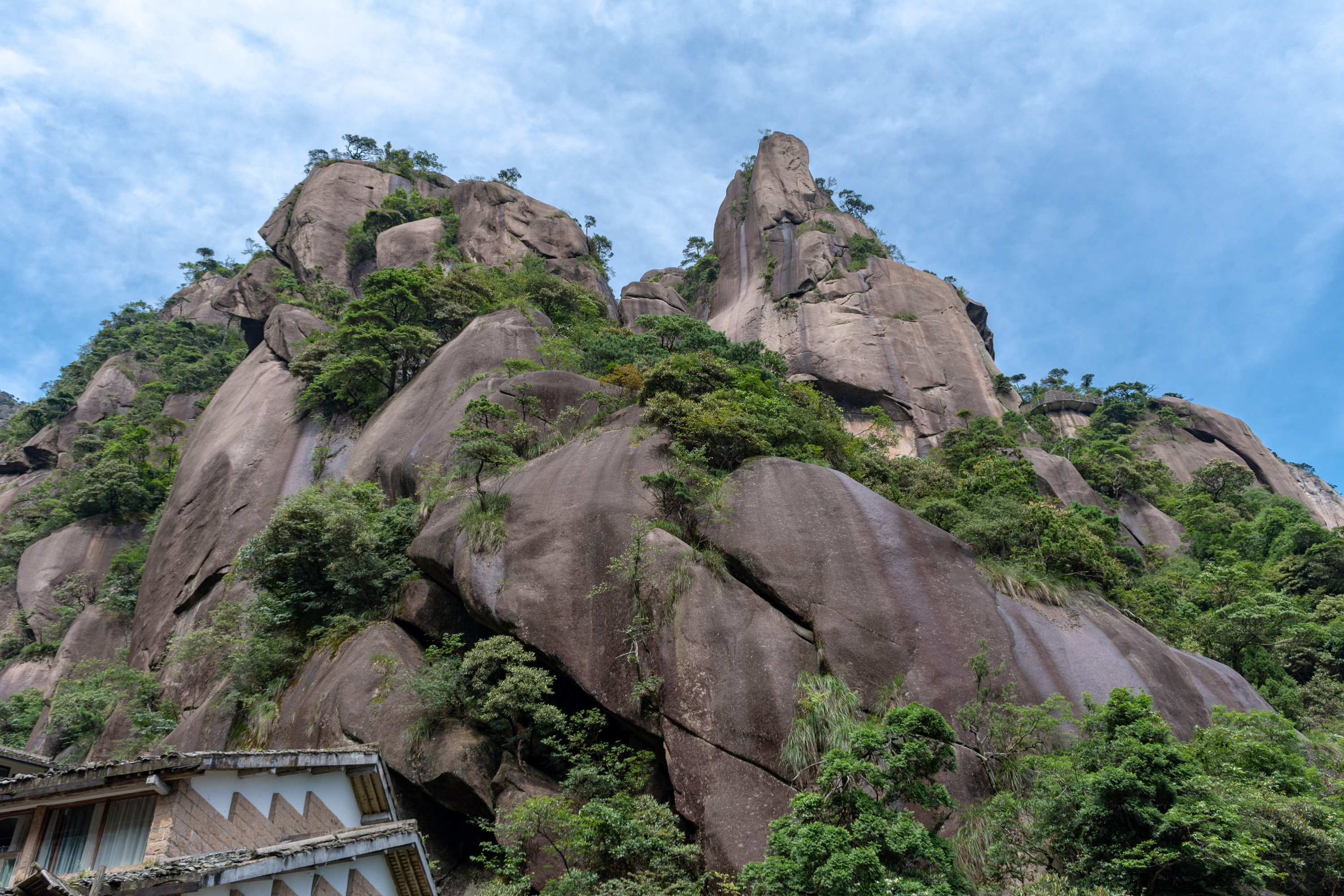

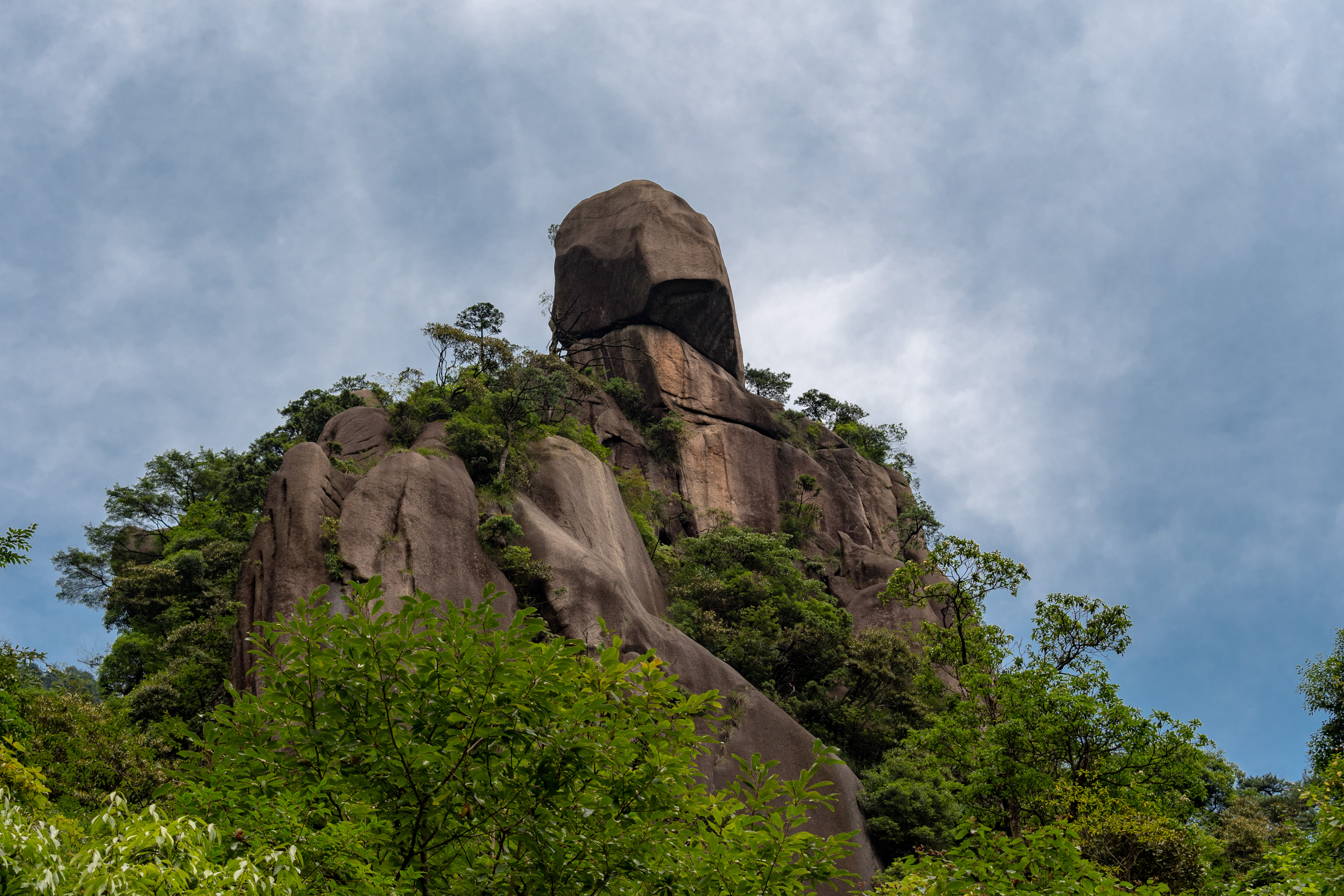

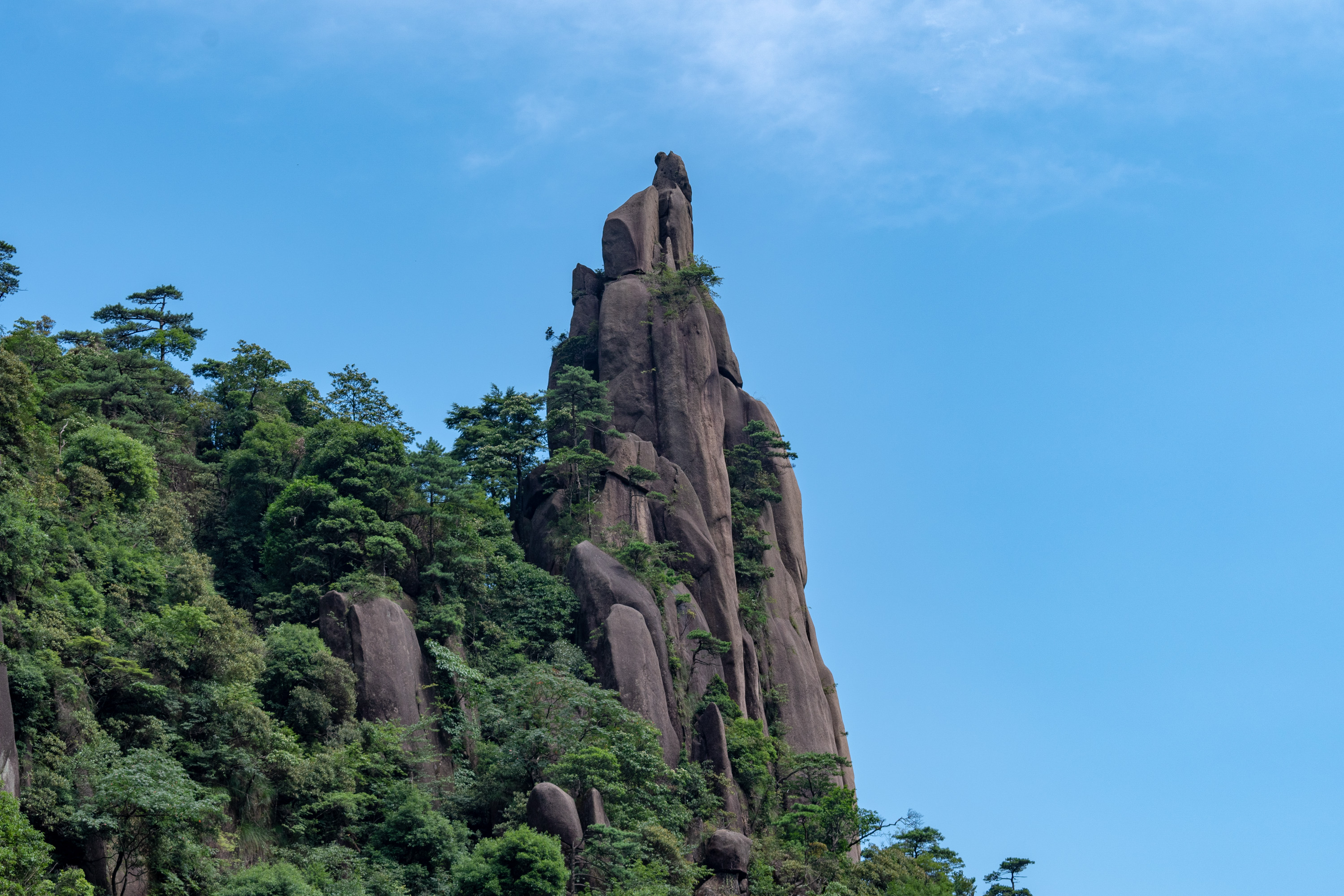

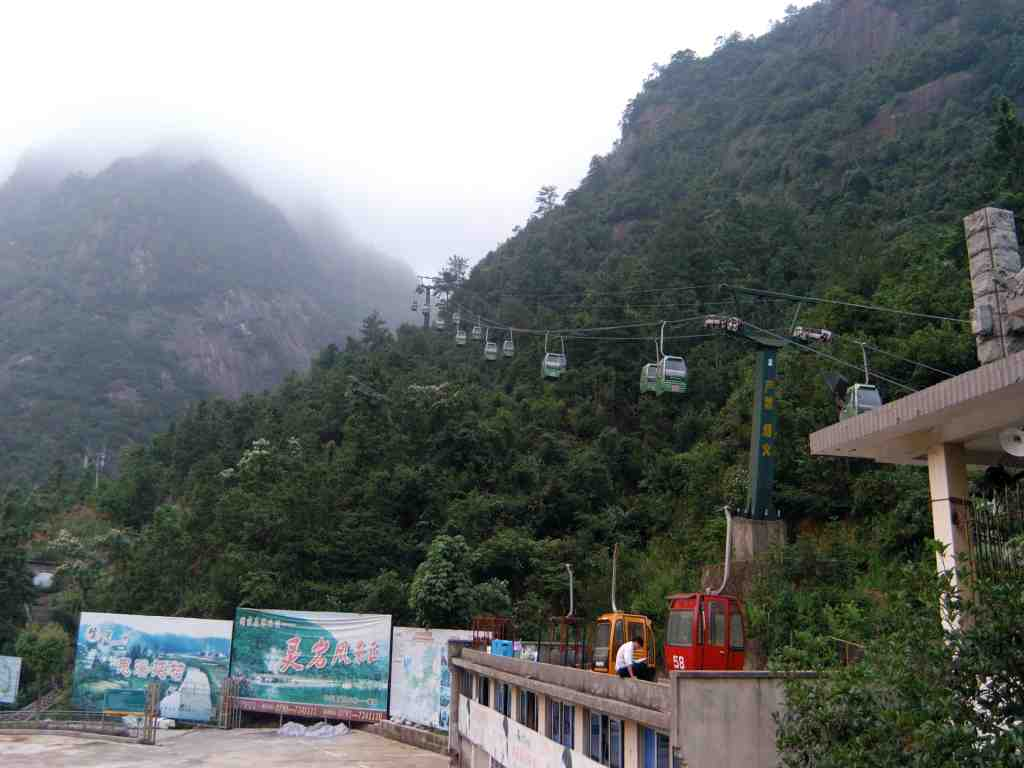
Cable car

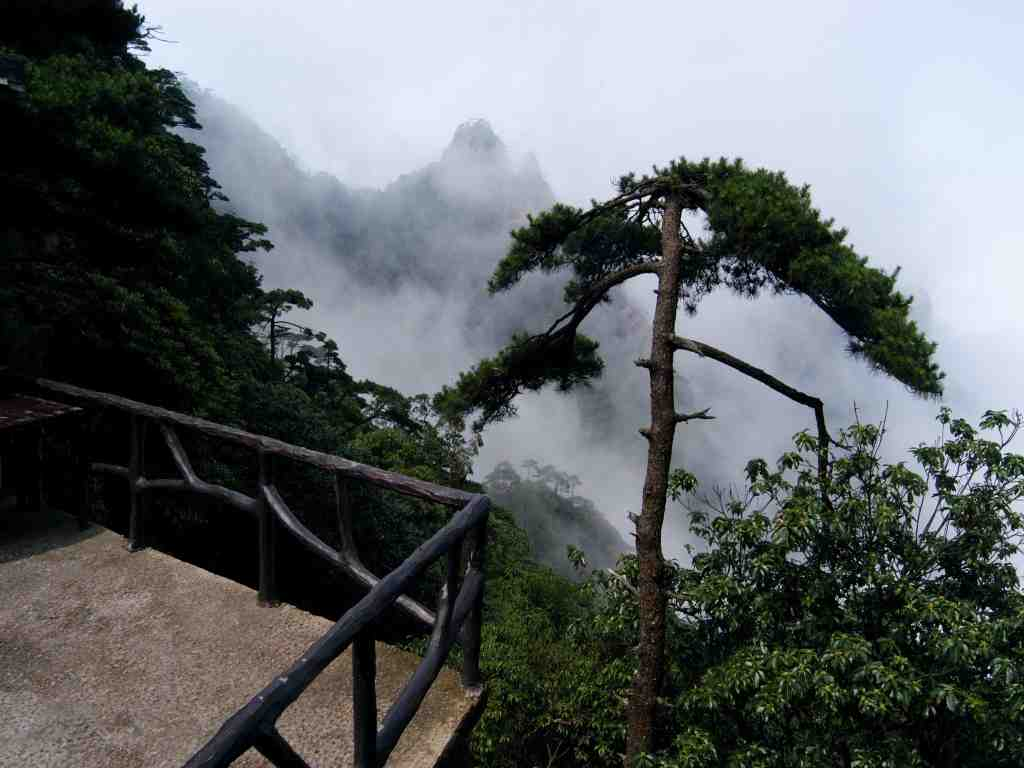
Pine tree on a mountain top

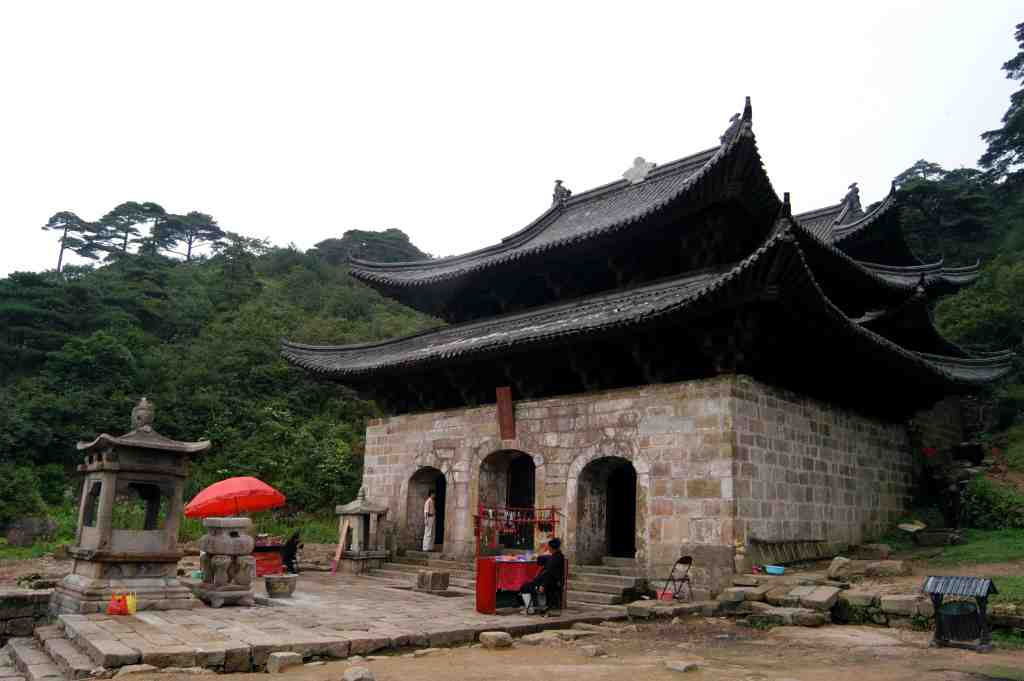
The San Qing temple

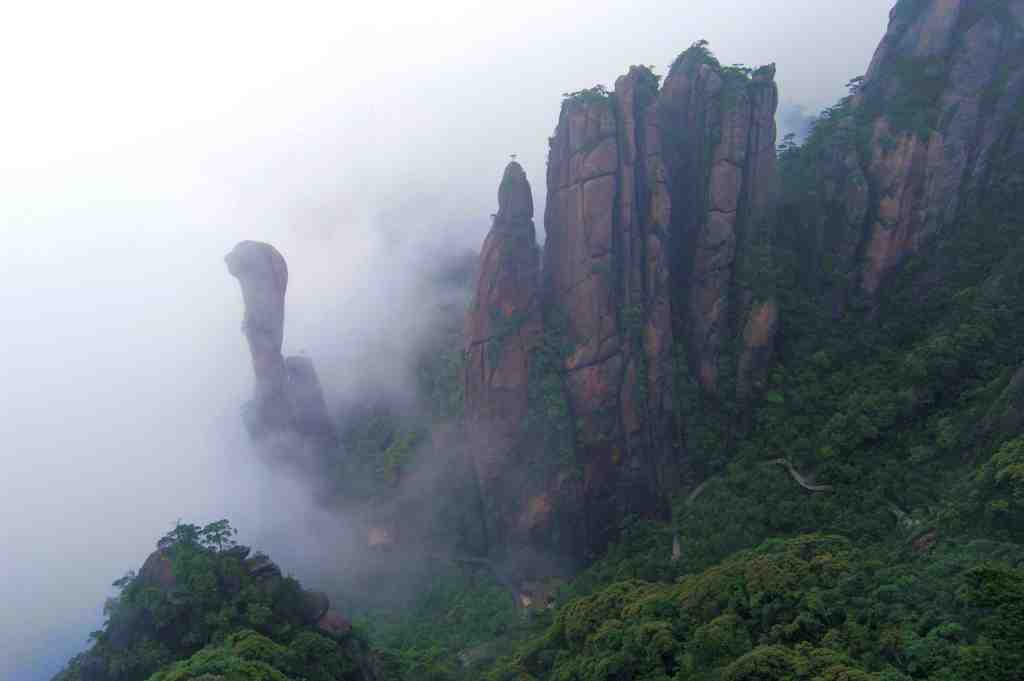
Snake rock

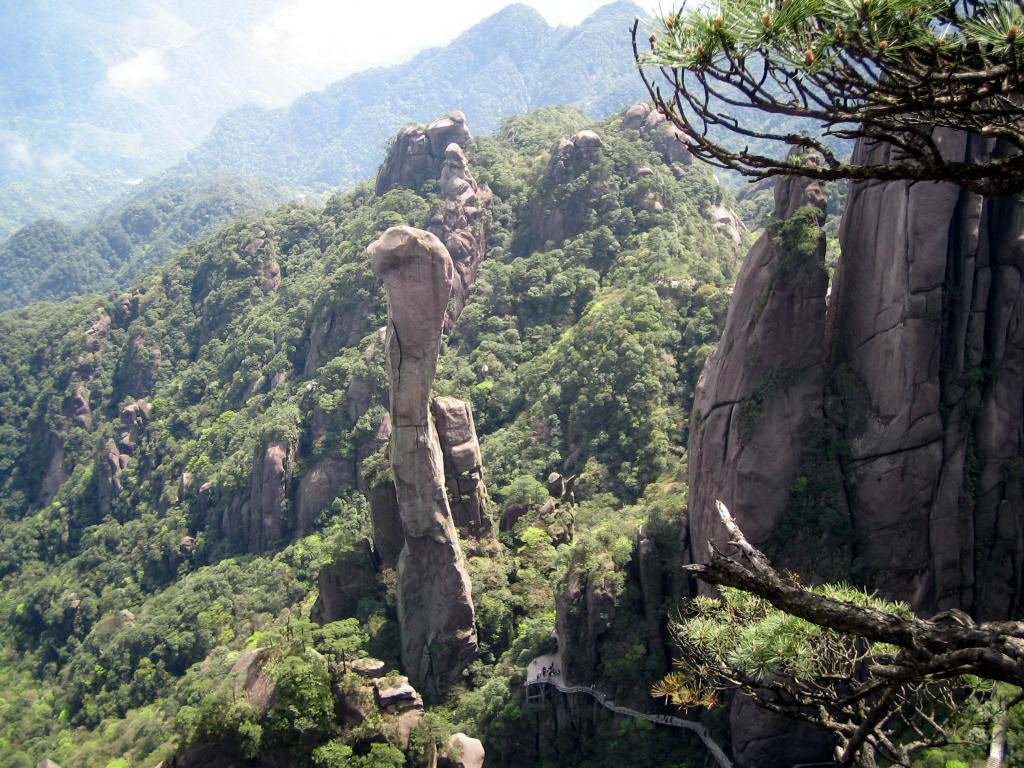

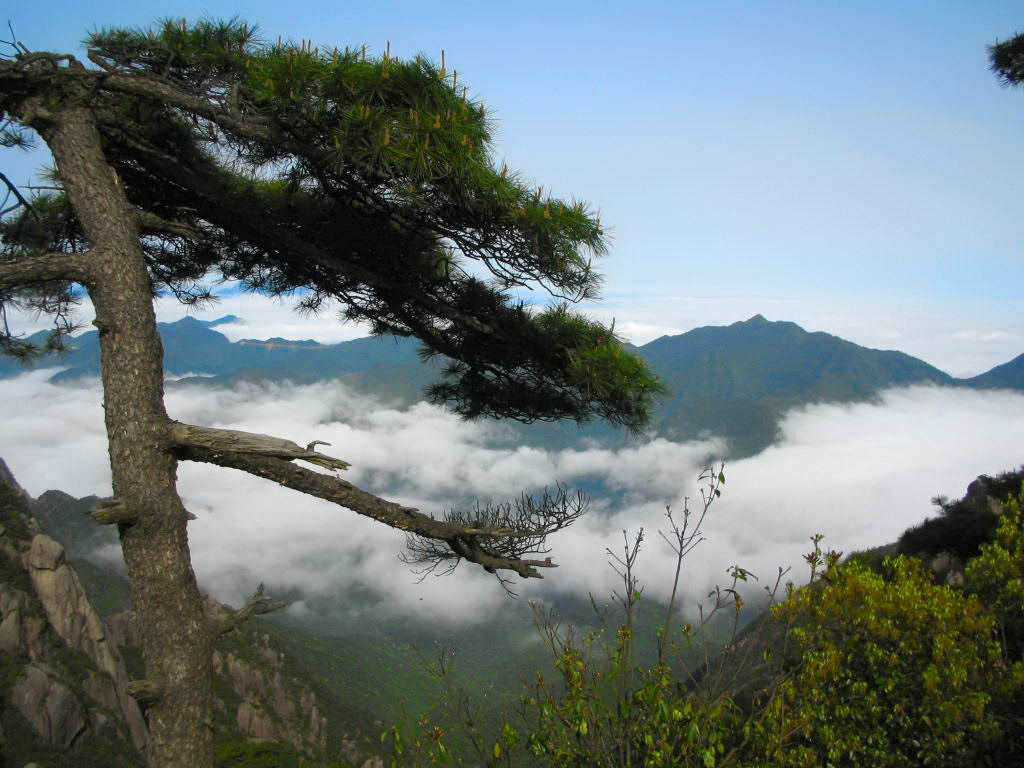

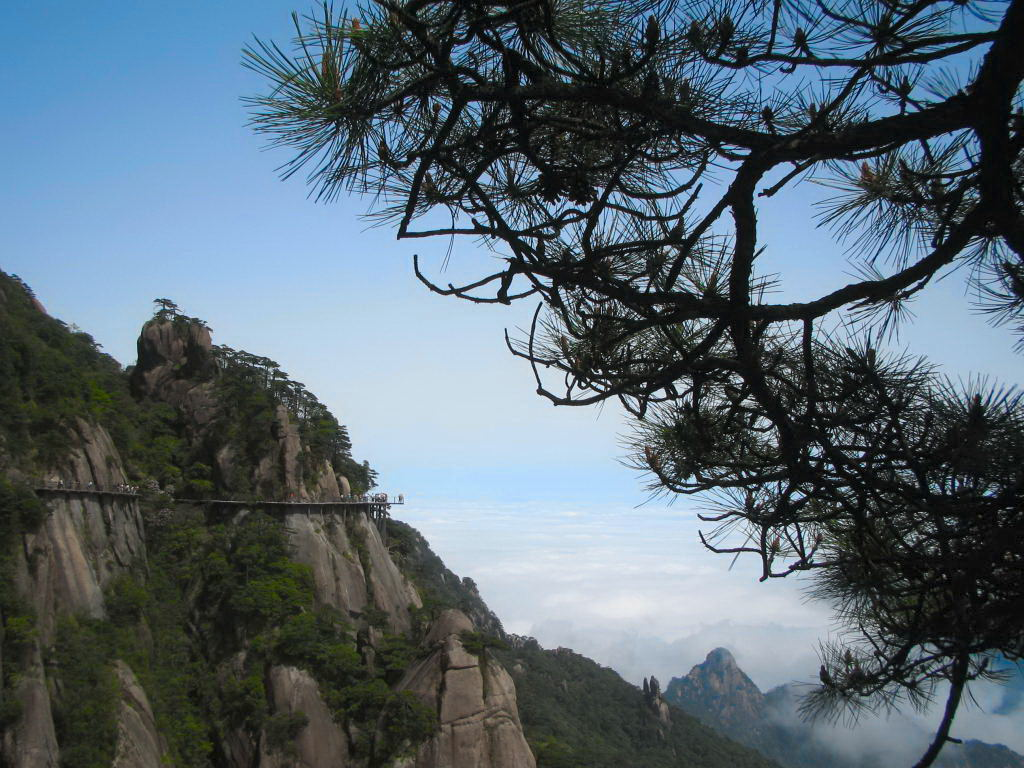

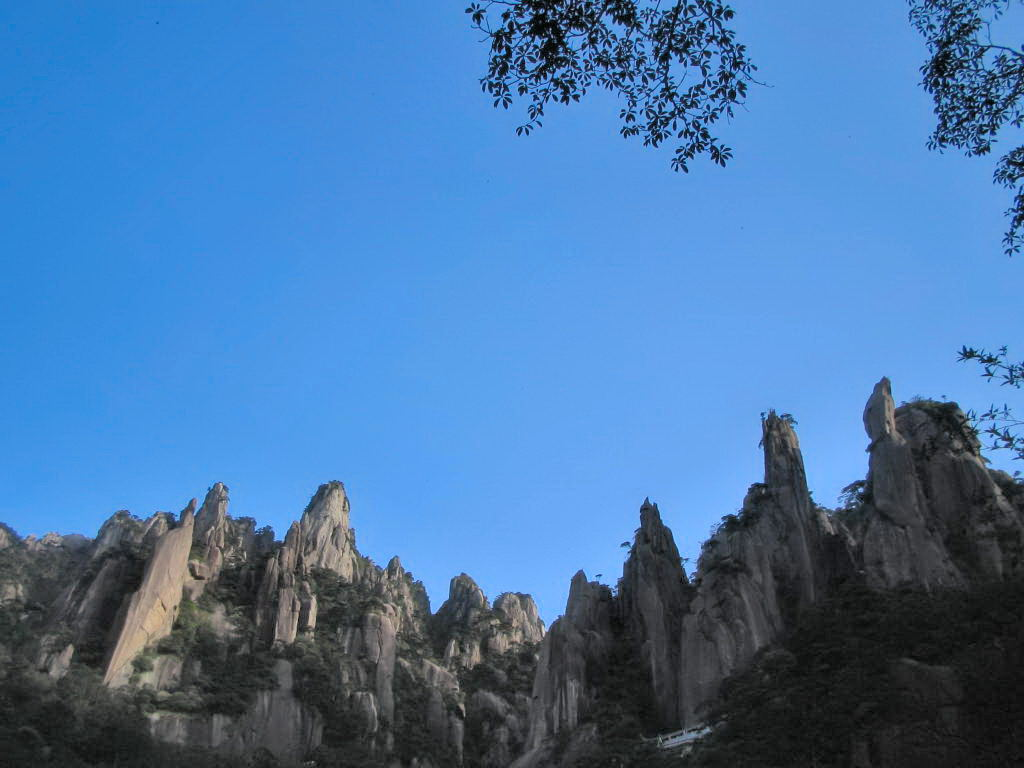

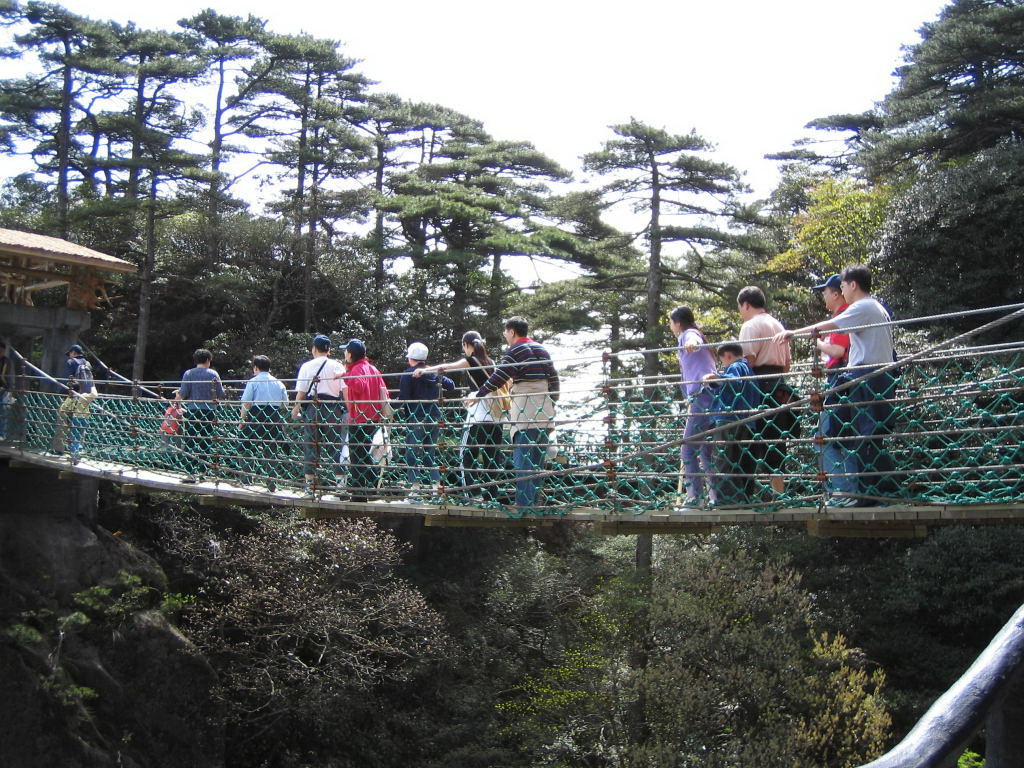

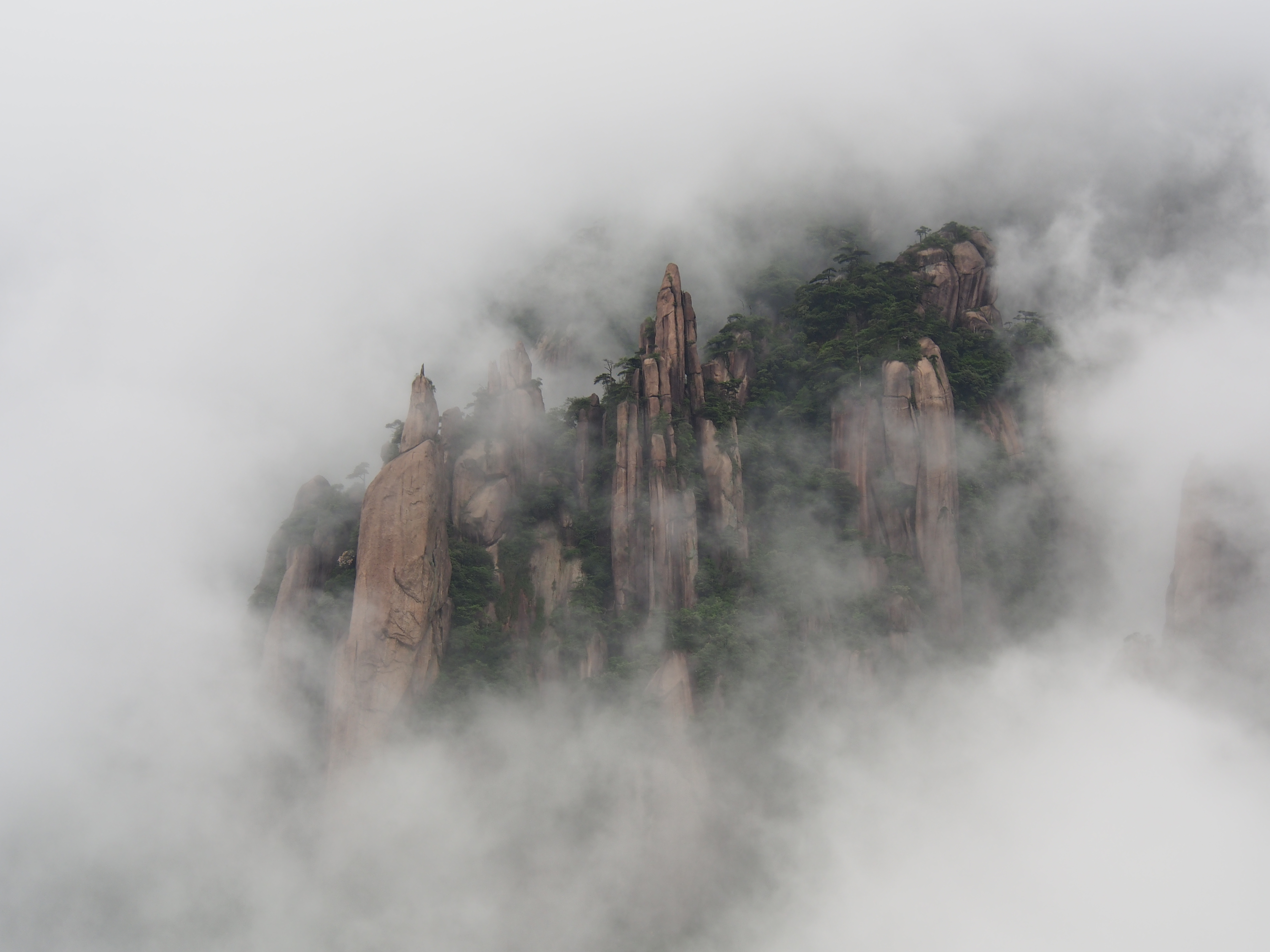
South slope of Sanqingshan in fog

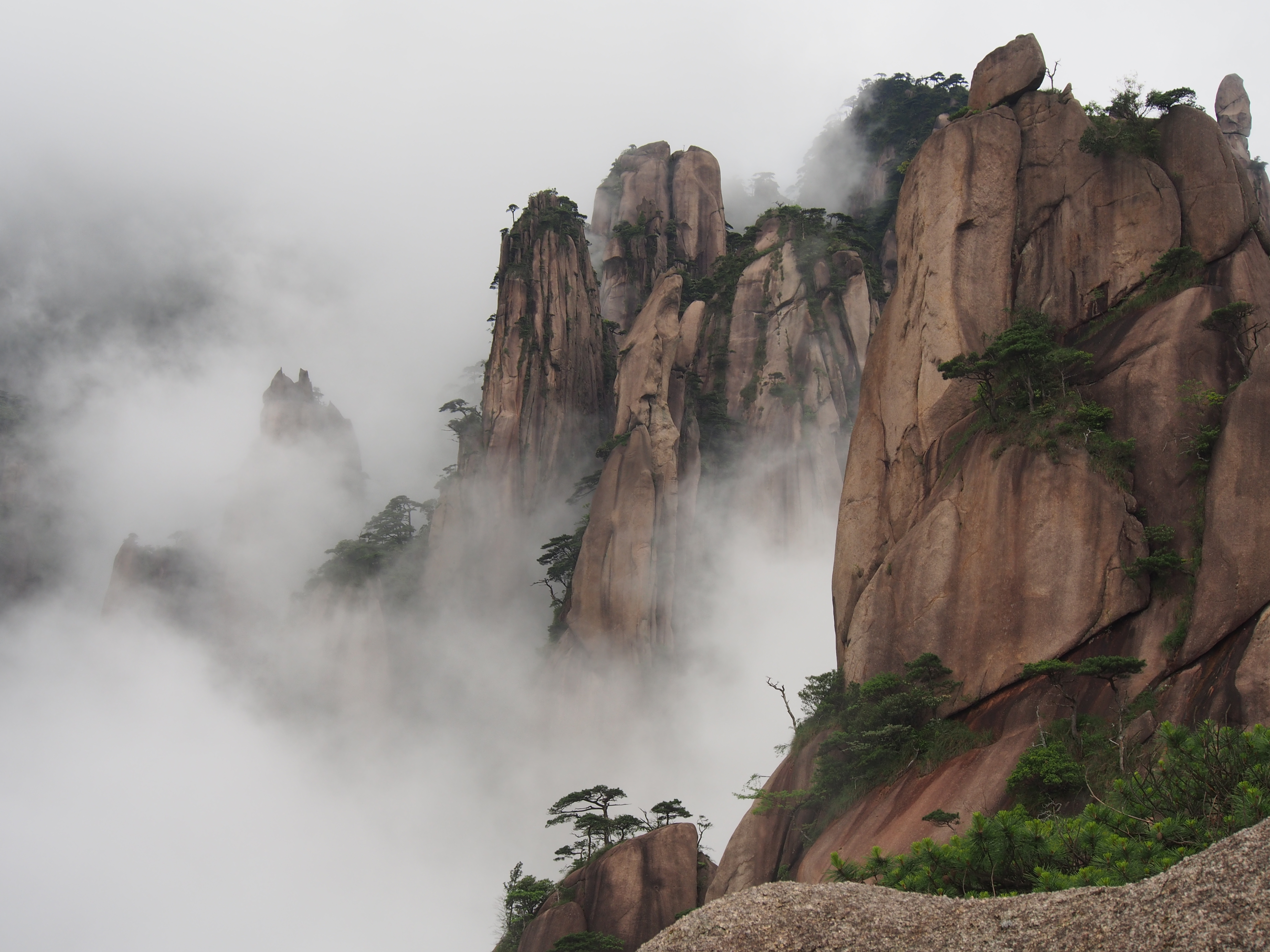
Sanqingshan's Longevity Garden in fog

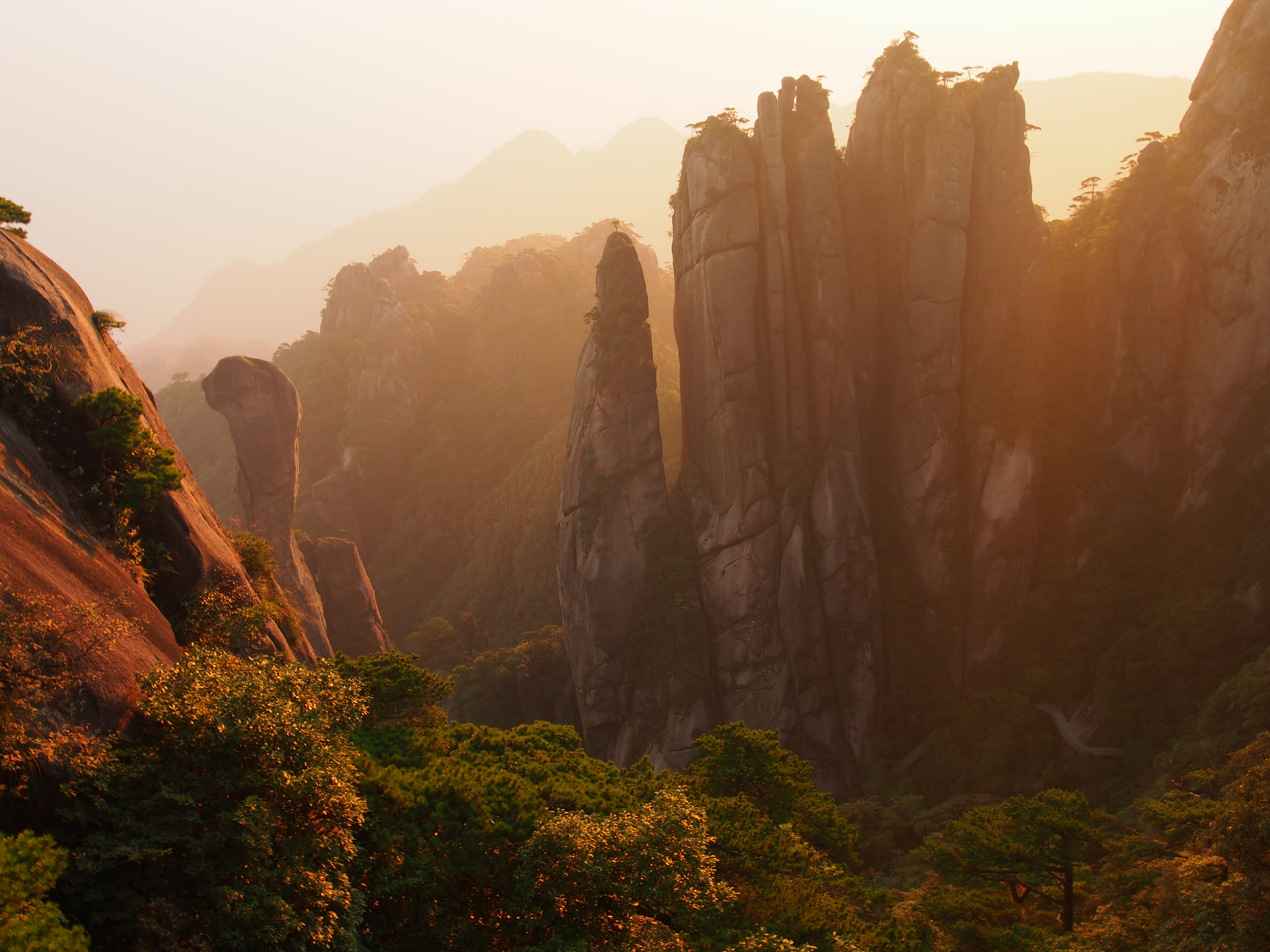
Sunrise at Sanqingshan, with the Giant Python Emerging from the Mountain
