= SciPhone =

Brand of Chinese cell phones

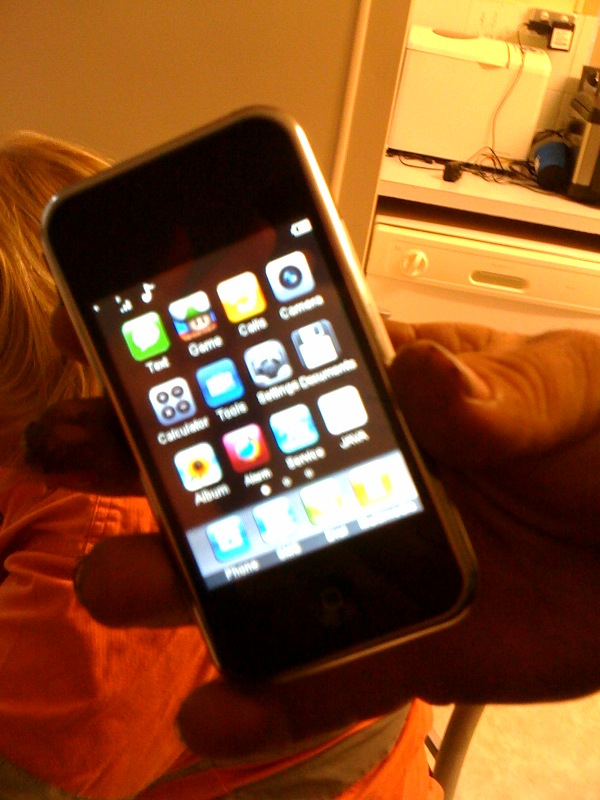
- A typical SciPhone. SciPhones usually imitate the designs of well-known products, such as the iPhone
- Type: Mobile phone brand
- Manufacturer: Bluelans Communications

SciPhone is a brand of Shanzhai cellular phone associated with a Chinese company called Bluelans Communications which produced imitation mobile phones using the designs of major brands of mobile phones. These phones were usually low priced. For example, it produced counterfeit devices that were very similar to Apple's iPhone and featured its basic functionalities.

The phones were available throughout the Internet, on major websites such as eBay and Alibaba, which were usually shipped from Hong Kong or Mainland China, while some had been known to ship from Singapore. In addition to being available online, the phones could commonly be found in Shanzhai-based marketplaces in China with various being rare to find. These marketplaces emerged as a culture in China, implying not only banditry but also a form of rebellion and the lack of state control. For some observers, SciPhone was part of the rip-off products that came to represent the people's resistance to the dominant cultural values in the country.

The phones have found repute and intrigue in major technology blogs, such as Gizmodo and Engadget, where they are usually labeled as KIRF or counterfeit. SciPhone devices are usually found running MediaTek's MAUI, however many newer models, such as the Sciphone N12, N16, N17, N19, and N21, are running Android 1.5.
