= Xing =

Xing may refer to:

- an abbreviation for crossing such as Pedestrian Xing or Wildlife Xing, primarily used in North America
- Xing (surname) (邢), a Chinese surname
- Xing (state), a state of ancient China during the Zhou Dynasty (1046–221 BCE)
- Xing County, in Shanxi, China
- Qiao Xing Universal Telephone Inc. (NASDAQ: XING)
- XING, a social network platform
- Xing Technology, known for the Xing Player
- Xing (cultural organization), cultural organization based in Bologna
- Xing, a fictional country mentioned in the manga and anime Fullmetal Alchemist, home of Ling Yao, Lan Fan, Fu, and May Chang.
- Xing, the Ancient Chinese conception of human nature
- Xīng (星) or Star, a Chinese constellation
