= Meizu M8 =

Smartphone

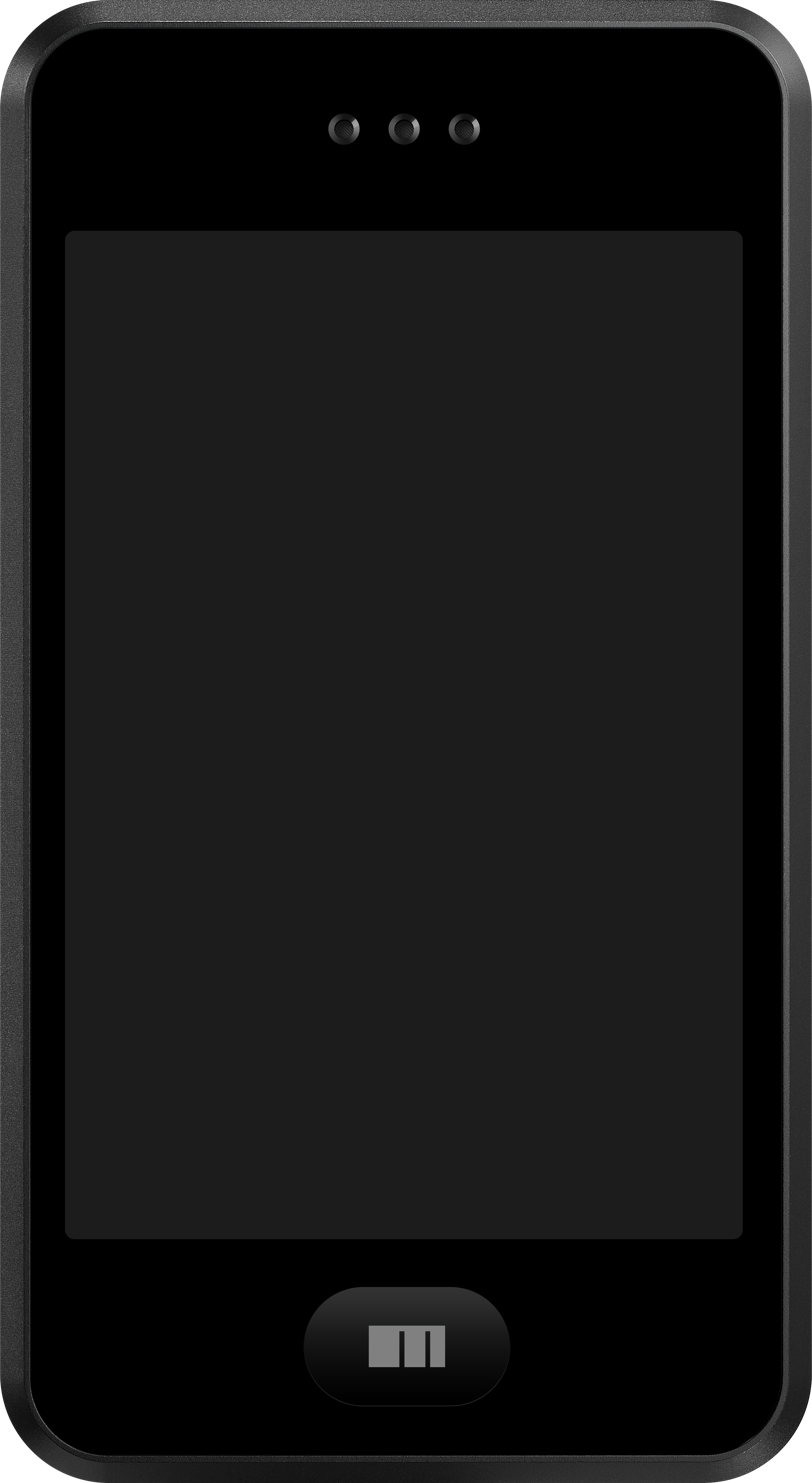
- Manufacturer: Meizu
- Type: Candybar Smartphone
- Released: April 2007; 19 years ago
- Operating system: Mymobile (Based on Windows CE 6.0) current version 0.9.8.22
- Memory: 256 MB
- Storage: Flash memory 8 or 16 GB
- Display: 720×480 px at 255 ppi, 3.4 in (86 mm), color LCD, 3:2 aspect ratio.
- Input: Headphone jack · Wi-Fi (Public testing version only)
- Camera: 3.2 megapixel
- Connectivity: Quad band GSM 900 1800 GPRS/EDGE
- Power: 3.7 V 1200 mAh Lithium-ion polymer battery
- Dimensions: 105×58×11.8mm
- Weight: 118 g (4.2 oz)
- Successor: Meizu M9

The Meizu M8 is a Windows CE-based 3.4" smartphone. It is often regarded as having a Chinese iPhone-like design, with similar features and UI, running a version of Microsoft Windows CE 6 with a modified GUI similar to the iPhone.

== Announcement dates ==
CEO Jack Wong announced the Meizu M8 four days after the announcement of the iPhone, as a direct competitor. The product was set for a November release but was later released for public testing in April 2007, in Shenzhen and Guangzhou, drawing positive reviews.

== Specifications ==
- Dimensions: 108 mm × 59 mm × 12 mm (H × W × T)
- Processor: Samsung ARM11 667 MHz CPU
- Display: 3.4-inch 16600K (OS 65536 colors), 720 × 480-pixel resolution, LTPS TFT LCD, with multi-touch (2 points)
- PC Interface: USB 2.0 Ultra-Fast Data Transfer
- Flash Memory: 8 or 16 GB of built-in basic Memory
- Operating System: Windows CE for Meizu M8 (Based on Windows CE 6.0) (Mymobile)
- Video Playback: AVI, MP4, RM, RMVB, 3GP, MOV, ASF, WMV, MPEG, MKV, FLV, MPEG-4/H.263/H.264 at 30fps

H.264 Baseline Profile :2.5 Mbit/s,720×480,30fps;
MPEG-4 Simple Profile :2 Mbit/s,720×480,30fps;
WMV 3 :3.2 Mbit/s,720×480,30fps;
H.263 :1.5 Mbit/s,720×480,30fps;
DivX :5Mbit/s,720×480,30fps;
Xvid :4Mbit/s,720×480,30fps;
DX50 :6Mbit/s,720×480,30fps;
MPEG-1 :1.5 Mbit/s,720×480,30fps;
FLV :500kbit/s,720×480,30fps

- Camera: 3.2 MP camera on the back. Supports auto-focus, and no flash.
- Battery: Removable 1200 mAh Li-ion

=== Support for ===
- GSM (850,900,1800, 1900 MHz), GPRS, EDGE, WiFi

=== Additional features ===
- The light sensor allows the phone to automatically adjust screen brightness in accordance with the lighting in the environment.
- Tilt and movement recognizing sensor that will allow it to auto-adjust screen orientation in accordance with tilting. It can also recognize movements (i.e. shaking), a feature that can be used for games.
- Proximity sensor for calling

== CeBIT Appearance ==
Meizu appeared at CeBIT on March 4, 2008, with a non-functional, plastic prototype of the M8 able to display three screenshots of the UI, and a development board running a partially working UI with most common phone functions. No fully working unit was shown, however.

On the second day of the exhibition, March 5, German police raided 51 booths including Meizu, where a newly developed MP3 player thought to infringe a Fraunhofer Society patent was confiscated.

== Production Halt ==
On October 9, 2010, it was reported that Meizu had shut down production of the M8 due to pressure from the Intellectual Property Offices and Apple Inc. because of its close similarities to the iPhone. Apple also was looking to ban all sales of the M8 as well, which some media outlets have speculated could bankrupt the company due to losses from unsold inventory, but no official word on this has been heard.

== See also ==
- Meizu M9
- Meizu MX
