= Huaiyu Mountains =

Mountain range in Jiangxi, China

- 怀玉山
- Location within Eastern China Location within China

Highest point
- Coordinates: 28°45′N 117°36′E

Geography
- Location: Yushan County, Jiangxi, China

The Huaiyu Mountains (simplified Chinese: 怀玉山; traditional Chinese: 懷玉山; pinyin: Huáiyù Shān) are a mountain range located in the prefecture of Yushan County, Jiangxi, China. One of its most famous mountains is Mount Sanqing.
