= Samsung Galaxy K Zoom =

2014 camera phone by Samsung Electronics

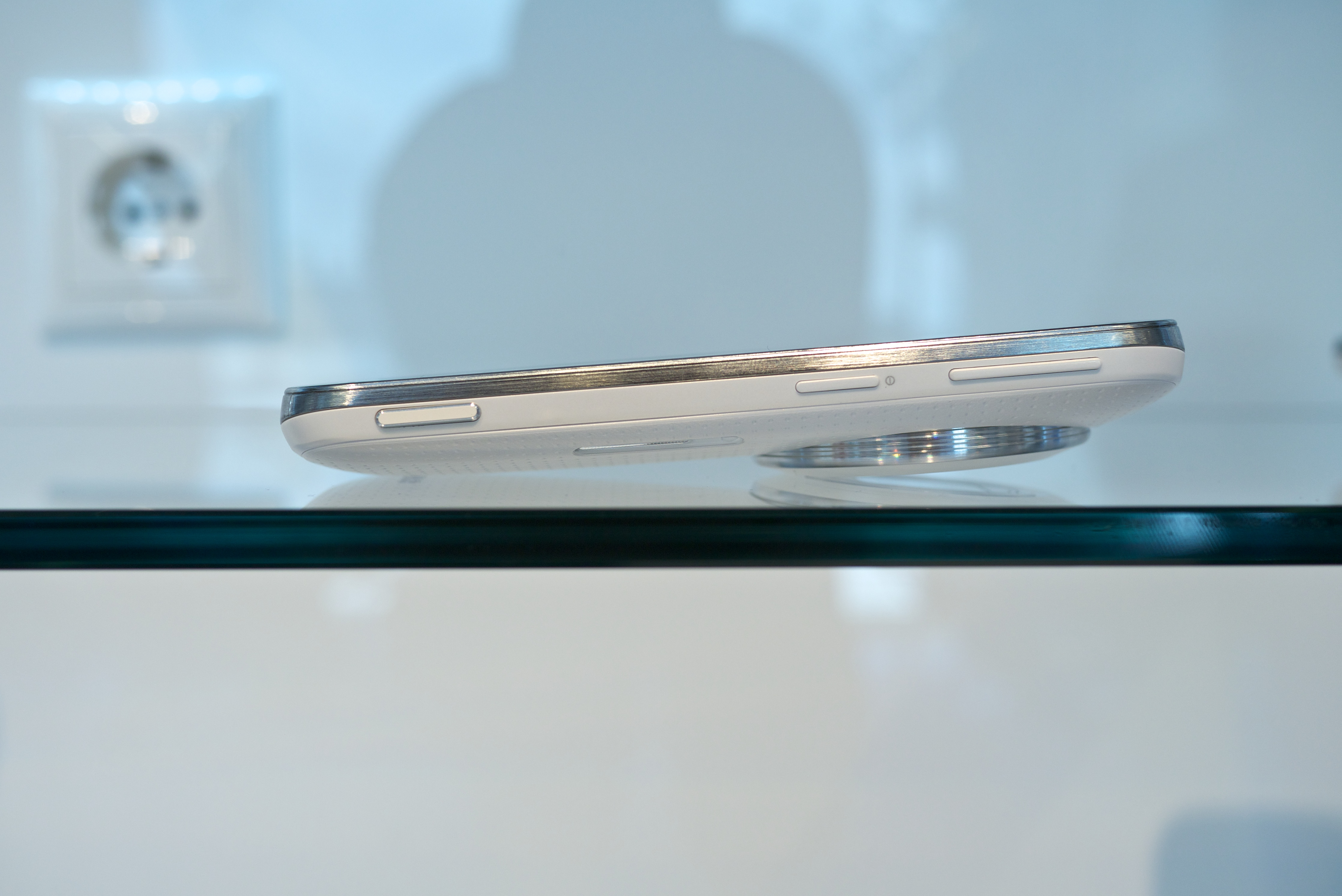
- White colour variant of the Samsung Galaxy K Zoom
- Also known as: Samsung Galaxy S5 Zoom (before release); Samsung Galaxy Zoom 2 (released in South Korea)
- Brand: Samsung
- Manufacturer: Samsung Electronics
- Type: Smartphone
- Series: Galaxy S
- Family: Samsung Galaxy
- First released: May 31, 2014; 12 years ago
- Availability by region: May 31, 2014; 12 years ago (UK and Singapore)
- Discontinued: March 1, 2015; 11 years ago
- Predecessor: Samsung Galaxy S4 Zoom
- Successor: Samsung Galaxy S6 Edge
- Related: Samsung Galaxy S5; Samsung Galaxy S5 Mini; Samsung Galaxy Alpha; Samsung Galaxy Note 4 Samsung Galaxy Note Edge; Samsung Galaxy A3 (2015); Samsung Galaxy A5 (2015); Samsung Galaxy A7 (2015); Samsung Galaxy A8 (2015)
- Compatible networks: List: C111 and General Wi-Fi IEEE 802.11 a/b/g/n (Frequency Band: 2.4/5 GHz Channel Bandwidth: 40 MHz Transmission Rate: 150 Mbps Download (2 x 2 MIMO) A-GPS GLONASS NFC DLNA Bluetooth 4.0 LE Infrared Communication 2G Quadruple Band GSM (8-band 850/10-band 900 MHz/13-band 1.8/14-band 1.9 GHz) Evolution of 2G GPRS 114 Kbps Download EDGE 384 Kbps Download 3G Quadruple Band UMTS (WCDMA) 1.9 Mbps Download/384 Kbps Upload (Band 5 850/Band 8 900 MHz/Band 2 1.9/Band 1 2.1 GHz) 3G Evolution HSDPA 14.4 Mbps Download/384 Kbps Upload HSUPA 14.4 Mbps Download/5.76 Mbps Upload HSPA+ 21.1 Mbps Download/5.76 Mbps Upload DC-HSDPA 42.2 Mbps Download C115 3G Evolution 6-Medium Band LTE-FDD 150 Mbps Download/50 Mbps Upload (Band 20 800/5 band 850/8 band 900 MHz/3 band 1.8/1 band 2.1/7 band 2.6 GHz)
- Form factor: Bar
- Dimensions: Width 70.8 mm Height 137.5 mm Thickness 16.6 (min)/20.2 (max) mm
- Weight: 200 g
- Operating system: Android 4.4.2 KitKat with TouchWiz Nature UX 3.0
- System-on-chip: Exynos 5 Hexa (5260)
- CPU: ARM Holdings Cortex-A15 1.7 GHz Dual Core + ARM Holdings Cortex-A7 1.3 GHz Quad Core
- GPU: ARM Holdings Mali-T624 (MP4) 533 MHz
- Memory: Type eMMC 4.5; Capacity 8 GB; 16 GB; MicroSD/SDHC/SDXC (Supports up to 64 GB)
- Storage: Capacity 2 GB; Type LPDDR3 SDRAM; Speed 12.8 GB/s (32-bit Dual Channel 800 MHz)
- SIM: MicroSIM
- Battery: Removable Lithium-ion battery 2,430 mAh; 3.8 V Approx. 9.23 Wh
- Rear camera: Sensor Information; Sensor Type; Samsung Electronics S5 BSI CMOS Image Sensor; Pixels; 20.7 million Sensor Size; 1/2.3; Aperture f/3.1~6.3 Shooting Performance; ISO 100~3,200; Focal Length 24 ~ 240 mm Up to 10x Optical Zoom; Optical Image Stabilization; Auto Focus/Manual Focus; Flash; Xenon Flash
- Front camera: Sensor Information; Sensor Type; Samsung Electronics S5K6B2 BSI CMOS Image Sensor; Pixels; 1.34 µm 2 million Sensor Size; 1/6 " Shooting Performance; Max 1080p HD quality video Shooting; Up to 30 fps video recording Fixed Focus
- Display: Approx. 4.8 " (12.19 cm) HD Super AMOLED (AM OLED); Resolution 720 x 1280 (720p HD, Pixel Density 306 ppi); 16777216 (2^{24}(24 bit)) Color; Gorilla Glass 3 HDMI
- Sound: Sound Chipset Wolfson WM1811; Audio Playback Capability 16 Bits; 44.1 kHz; Sound Field SoundAlive
- Connectivity: USB 2.0; USB On-the-Go; MHL 1.3; HDMI (Micro USB Type B/HDMI Type D integrated connector); 3.5 mm US TRRS (4-pole) Phone Connector
- Data inputs: Geomagnetic; Accelerometer; Gyroscope; Proximity; Ambient light
- Model: SM-C111 (Standard 3G Model); SM-C115 (Standard LTE Model)
- Website: Galaxy K Zoom

The Samsung Galaxy K Zoom (formerly known as the Samsung Galaxy S5 Zoom before being announced) is an Android-based smartphone manufactured, developed and designed by Samsung Electronics, and is the successor to the Galaxy S4 Zoom. It was unveiled on April 29, 2014, and released on May 31, 2014. It comes with a 10x zoom camera (24-240mm) with 20.7 megapixels, with Android 4.4.2. The Galaxy K Zoom also utilizes the letter "K" for "Kapture" or "Kamera". Its slogan is "Capture the Moment".

== History ==
Its removable polycarbonate rear cover has the same dotted pattern as the Galaxy S5, and it shares the same version of TouchWiz (Nature UX 3.0).

Although lacking 4K (2160p) video, it supports video recording with 1080p at 60 frames per second and slow motion 720p at 120 frames per second, the latter without audio.

Its camera software features a "Pro Suggest" mode that automatically suggests the appropriate camera modes for the current scene.

The K Zoom has 2 GB RAM, 8 GB built-in flash, microSD, NFC, Wi-Fi, Bluetooth 4.0, 4.8 inch 1280×720 px Super AMOLED (306 ppi), 6-core Exynos 5 Hexa (Exynos 5260) SoC, Mali-T624 GPU, 200 g and 20.2 millimeters at thickest point.

It has additional camera controls such as the ability to separate focus and exposure areas. A disadvantage in comparison to the S4 Zoom is that one can't use the Optical Zoom, while recording Slow Motion Videos. The new design of the K Zoom also removed the camera tripod screw thread and the rotary ring around the zoom lens.
