= Galaxy Edge =

Galaxy Edge may refer to:

- Samsung Galaxy Note Edge, an Android tablet with a single curved edge
- Samsung Galaxy S6 Edge, an Android smartphone with two curved edges
- Samsung Galaxy S6 Edge+, an Android phablet with two curved edges
- Samsung Galaxy S7 Edge, successor to the S6 Edge+
- Samsung Galaxy S25 Edge, teased on Samsung event, April 2025

== Other uses ==
- Star Wars: Galaxy's Edge, a Star Wars-themed area at Disneyland and Disney's Hollywood Studios
