= Samsung Galaxy Alpha =

2014 mid-range smartphone by Samsung Electronics

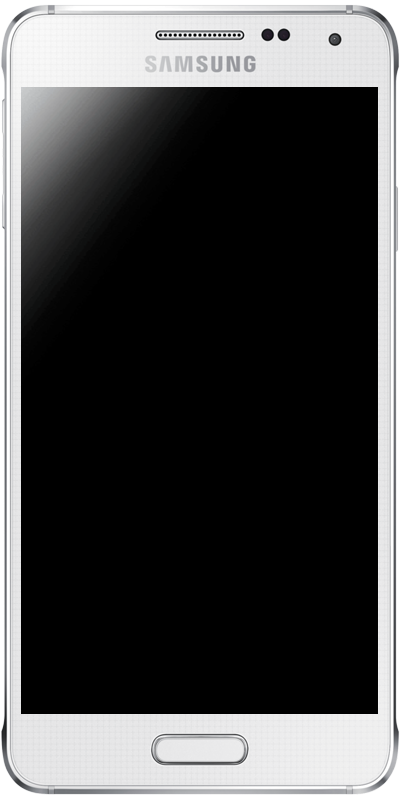
- Samsung Galaxy Alpha in White
- Brand: Samsung
- Manufacturer: Samsung Electronics
- Type: Smartphone
- Series: Samsung Galaxy
- Family: Samsung Galaxy
- First released: September 12, 2014; 12 years ago
- Availability by region: September 12, 2014; 12 years ago
- Predecessor: Samsung Galaxy S5 Mini
- Successor: Samsung Galaxy A3 (2015); Samsung Galaxy A5 (2015); Samsung Galaxy A7 (2015)
- Related: Samsung Galaxy S5; Samsung Galaxy K Zoom; Samsung Galaxy S5 Mini; Samsung Galaxy Note 4 Samsung Galaxy Note Edge
- Compatible networks: (GSM/GPRS/EDGE): 850, 900, 1,800 and 1,900 MHz; 3G (HSDPA 42.2 Mbit/s, HSUPA 5.76 Mbit/s): 850, 900, 1,900 and 2,100 MHz; LTE: 800, 850, 900, 1,800, 2,100 and 2,600 MHz; 3G TD-SCDMA 1900 / 2000 MHz; LTE-TDD
- Form factor: Slate
- Dimensions: 132.4 mm (5.21 in) H 65.5 mm (2.58 in) W 6.7 mm (0.26 in) D
- Weight: 115 g (4.1 oz)
- Operating system: Original: Android 4.4.4 "KitKat" with TouchWiz Nature UX 3.0; Current: Android 5.0.2 "Lollipop" with TouchWiz Nature UX 4.0
- System-on-chip: Exynos 5 Octa 5430 (Global); Qualcomm Snapdragon 801 MSM8974AC (U.S & China)
- CPU: ARM Big Little (ARM Cortex-A15 MP4 1.8 GHz CPU + ARM Cortex-A7 MP4 1.3 GHz CPU) (Global); Qualcomm Krait 400 MP4 2.5 GHz (U.S & China)
- GPU: ARM Mali T628MP6 (Global); Qualcomm Adreno 330 578 MHz (U.S & China)
- Memory: 2 GB
- Storage: 32 GB
- Battery: Replaceable 1860 mAh Li-ion-Battery
- Rear camera: 12 megapixels List: Back-illuminated sensor; LED flash; HD video (1080p) at 30 frames/s (fps) or 60 fps; UHD 4K (3840×2160 px) video recording 30 fps (max. 4 minutes); 720p@120fps (menial method)
- Front camera: 2.1 megapixels (1080p) HD video recording @ 30 fps back-illuminated sensor
- Display: 4.7 in (119 mm) 1280×720 px Super AMOLED (312 ppi)
- Connectivity: List: Wi-Fi :802.11 a/b/g/n/ac (2.4/5 GHz); Wi-Fi Direct; Wi-Fi hotspot; DLNA; GPS/GLONASS; NFC; Bluetooth 4.0 BLE; USB 2.0 (Micro-B port, USB charging) USB OTG (OTG USB support up to 256 GB); 3.50 mm (0.138 in) headphone jack GSM / HSPA / LTE
- Data inputs: List: Fingerprint recognition; Heart rate sensor; Motion coprocessor; Accelerometer; Gesture sensor; Gyroscope; Proximity sensor; Compass; Barometer; Hall-effect sensor; RGB ambient light
- Model: SM-G850x
- Development status: Discontinued

The Samsung Galaxy Alpha is a mid-range Android-based smartphone manufactured, developed and produced by Samsung Electronics. It was announced on August 13, 2014 and released on September 12, 2014. The Galaxy Alpha is the Samsung's first Android-powered smartphone to incorporate a metallic frame, although the remainder of its physical appearance still resembles previous models such as the Galaxy S5. It also incorporates Samsung's new Exynos 5430 system-on-chip, which is the first mobile system-on-chip to use a 20 nanometer manufacturing process.

The Galaxy Alpha received mixed reviews; although praised for its higher quality build and design in comparison to earlier products, the device was panned for its modest specifications in comparison to its flagship counterpart, the Galaxy S5, and for being priced too high for what they considered to be a "mid-range" smartphone.

== Development ==
In early-June 2014, images leaked of an upcoming Samsung phone tentatively known as the "Galaxy F", shown alongside a Galaxy S5: it incorporated a metallic frame, thinner bezels around the screen than the S5, and was to allegedly include a quad HD display, Snapdragon 805 system-on-chip, along with the heart rate sensor and water/dust-proofing from the S5. On June 18, 2014, Samsung would unveil an LTE-Advanced version of the S5 with a quad HD display, exclusively for release in South Korea. A Samsung representative stated it had "no plans" to release this device globally.

In late July 2014, further images leaked of the rumored device, now identified as the "Galaxy Alpha"; the device depicted was now a mid-range device positioned below the S5, incorporating a metallic frame, a 720p 4.7 in (119 mm) display similar to the Galaxy S III, and no expandable storage. On July 31, 2014, Kim Hyun-joon, senior vice president of Samsung's mobile business, told investors that the company was planning to release a major new device incorporating "new materials" by the end of 2014. Critics interpreted his statement as signs that the company was planning to make a metal smartphone, but that it could also be a new entry in the Galaxy Note series.

On August 13, 2014, Samsung officially unveiled the Galaxy Alpha. Samsung Electronics CEO JK Shin explained that the Alpha was "built and designed based on the specific desires of the consumer market." The company stated that the Galaxy Alpha would mark a "new design approach" for Samsung's products, and that elements from the Alpha could appear on future Samsung models. Later in 2014, Samsung would unveil the low-range Galaxy A3 and the mid-range Galaxy A5, which featured slim builds and a similar metal design. The Galaxy S6 would fully realize Samsung's new design direction, utilizing a unibody metal frame and glass backing.

== Specifications ==
=== Design ===
The Galaxy Alpha's overall design is an evolution upon that of the Galaxy S5, incorporating a chamfered metal frame and a dimpled, plastic rear cover. With a thickness of 6.7 mm (0.26 in)At the time, the Galaxy Alpha was the company's thinnest smartphone.

=== Chipsets ===
International models of the Alpha utilize an octa-core, Exynos 5430 system-on-chip; consisting of a bank of four 1.8 GHz Cortex-A15 cores, and four 1.3 GHz Cortex-A7 cores. The Exynos 5430 is the first ever mobile system-on-chip to use a 20 nanometer HKMG manufacturing process. The international model was the first device to incorporate Intel's XMM7260 modem for category 6 LTE Advanced support. U.S. models include a 2.5 GHz Snapdragon 801 processor instead; both models include 2 GB of RAM.

=== Display, battery and storage ===
The Galaxy Alpha features a PenTile 720p 4.7 in (120 mm) Super AMOLED display, and also incorporates a 12 megapixel rear-facing camera without optical image stabilization, fingerprint and heart rate sensors, and removable 1860 mAh battery. The device includes 32 GB of non-expandable storage, and runs Android 4.4.4 "KitKat" but can be upgraded to Android 5.0.2 "Lollipop" with Samsung's TouchWiz software suite.

The Galaxy Alpha is equipped with Samsung's Air View (using floating finger), air gesture controls (also known as "Motion Gestures") and Smart Screen functionality introduced on the Galaxy S4.

Air View is enabled using a self-capacitive touch screen layer that is also referred to by Samsung as "TSP Hovering".

=== Camera ===
The rear camera is able to record video footage at 2160p (4K) at 30 frames per second (fps), 1080p at 60fps, and 720p at 120fps.

This makes it the first smartphone by Samsung outside of the Galaxy S and Note series to feature 2160p (4K) video recording, and the second one after the Galaxy K Zoom to feature 1080p video recording at 60 frames per second and 720p at 120 frames per second. However, 2160p videos are limited to four minutes per video, after which the video recording has to be restarted. In addition, 720p at 120fps video footage is recorded without sound and encoded as slowed-down video.

== Reception ==
While praising Samsung's decision to begin manufacturing a smartphone that incorporates actual metal in its design, critics noted that despite its "premium" appearance, the internal specifications of the Galaxy Alpha were "mid-range" in comparison to the S5, with particular emphasis placed on the device's smaller, lower-resolution screen, the replacement of its USB 3.0 port with a USB 2.0 port, and its smaller battery. However, Ars Technica noted that the lower screen resolution could offset the lower capacity of the device's battery, and ExtremeTech also noted that the smaller battery would make the device lighter, and the lower resolution of the display could improve the responsiveness of Samsung's Android distribution. In conclusion, the Alpha was considered by ExtremeTech to be "a hedge against several troubling trends for the world’s largest smartphone maker", believing that its slimmer build and higher quality design were an attempt to compete against the then-upcoming iPhone 6, which features a 4.7 inch display.

Engadget described the Galaxy Alpha as Samsung's "most beautiful phone yet", praising its design for being "simple, yet elegant; minimal, yet profuse". Its overall performance was considered to be up to par with the Galaxy S5, and its display was described as being "acceptable" for its class. However, the Galaxy Alpha was criticized for being too expensive for its class, concluding that "the only reason you'd want to pick this over the Galaxy S5, which is available for a similar price, is that you prefer a smaller size or more solid build. But even then, this design isn't a one-and-done; you'll be able to get the same fit and finish on the Note 4 and Note Edge (albeit with larger screens)."
