= SGSV =

SGSV may refer to:

- Svalbard Global Seed Vault, a secure seedbank on the Norwegian island of Spitsbergen
- Samsung Galaxy S5, an Android smartphone produced by Samsung Electronics
