= Samsung Galaxy Note 4 =

2014 flagship smartphone by Samsung Electronics

Samsung Galaxy Note 4 Samsung Galaxy Note 4 S-LTE

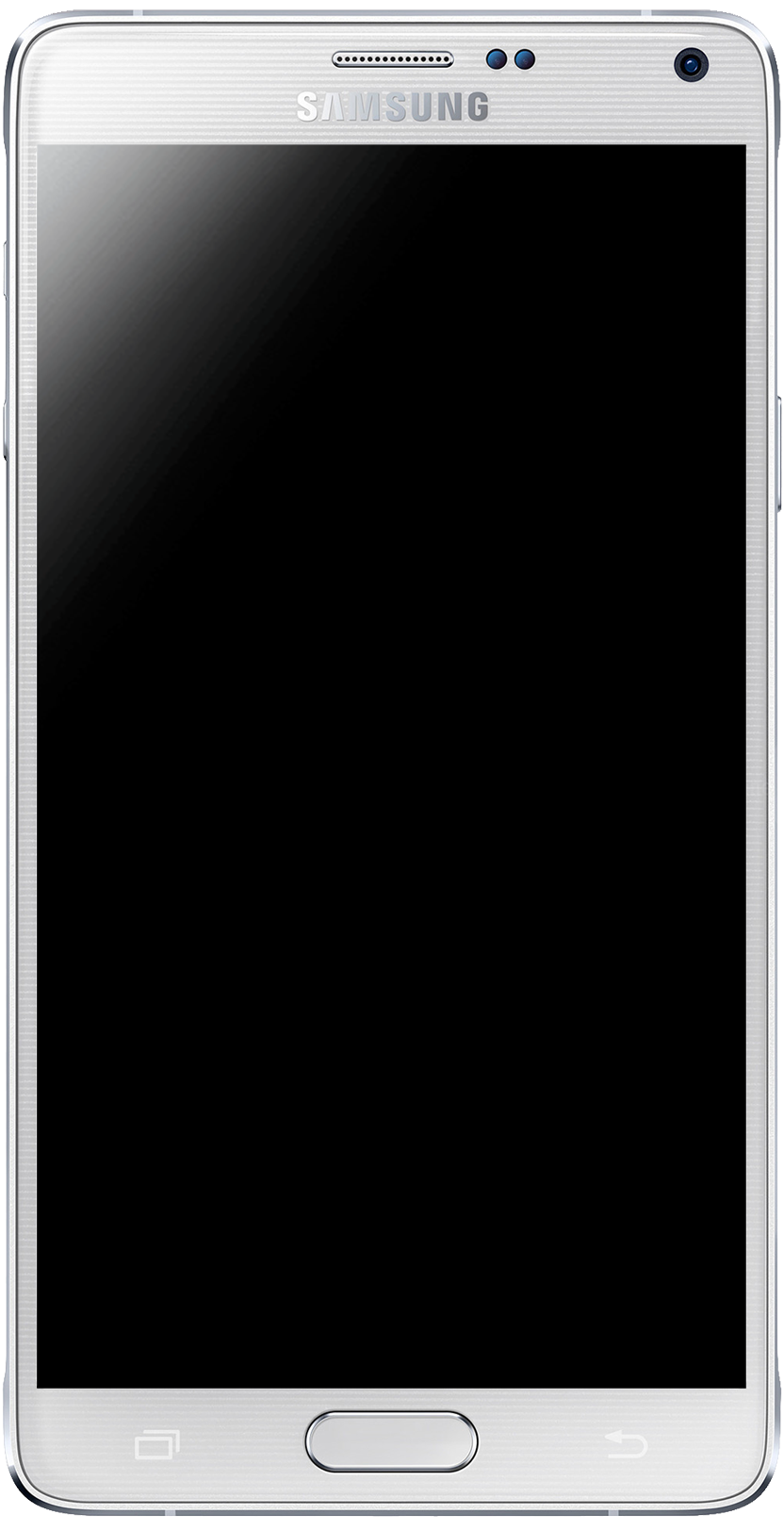
- Samsung Galaxy Note 4 in Frost White
- Brand: Samsung
- Manufacturer: Samsung Electronics
- Type: Phablet
- Series: Galaxy Note
- Family: Samsung Galaxy
- First released: Note 4: October 17, 2014; 12 years ago Note 4 S-LTE: January 2015; 11 years ago
- Availability by region: Note 4: Worldwide: October 17, 2014; 12 years ago India/Australia: November 2014; 12 years ago Note 4 S-LTE: January 2015; 11 years ago
- Discontinued: August 19, 2016; 10 years ago
- Predecessor: Samsung Galaxy Note 3
- Successor: Samsung Galaxy Note 5
- Related: Samsung Galaxy S5; Samsung Galaxy K Zoom; Samsung Galaxy S5 Mini; Samsung Galaxy Alpha; Samsung Galaxy Note Edge; Samsung Galaxy A3 (2015); Samsung Galaxy A5 (2015); Samsung Galaxy A7 (2015); Samsung Galaxy A8 (2015)
- Form factor: Slate
- Colors: Charcoal Black, Bronze Gold, Blossom Pink, Frost White
- Dimensions: H: 153.5 mm (6.04 in); W: 78.6 mm (3.09 in); D: 8.5 mm (0.33 in)
- Weight: 176 g (6.2 oz)
- Operating system: Original (Note 4): Android 4.4.4 "KitKat" with TouchWiz Nature UX 3.5; Original (Note 4 S-LTE): Android 5.0.1 "Lollipop" with TouchWiz Nature UX 4.0; Current: Android 6.0.1 "Marshmallow" with TouchWiz Nature UX 4.5; Unofficial: Android 11, LineageOS
- System-on-chip: LTE Cat.4 & South Korea LTE Cat.6 & LTE Cat.9 (S-LTE) versions: Samsung Exynos 7 Octa 5433 64-bit LTE Cat.6 version: Qualcomm Snapdragon 805
- CPU: Exynos version: Quad-core 1.9 GHz Cortex-A57; Quad-core 1.3 GHz Cortex-A53; Snapdragon version: Quad-core 2.7 GHz Krait 450
- GPU: Exynos version: ARM Mali T760 MP6; Snapdragon version: Adreno 420
- Memory: 3 GB LPDDR3
- Storage: Global: 32 GB eMMC 5.0; China variant: 16 GB
- Removable storage: microSDXC up to 128 GB
- SIM: Mini SIM
- Battery: User-replaceable Li-ion 3,220 mAh, 15 W charging speed
- Charging: Qualcomm Quick Charge 15 W (9 V, 1.67 A) fast charging
- Rear camera: 16 MP (5312×2988), f2.2, 1/2.6 inch sensor, with autofocus, OIS, 2160p at 30 fps (limited to 5 mins), 1440p at 30 fps, 1080p at 30/60 fps, 720p at 30/60 fps, slow motion video recording at 720p at 120 fps
- Front camera: 3.7 MP, f1.9, 1440p/1080p/720p video recording
- Display: 5.7 inch (145 mm) Quad HD Super AMOLED (16:9 aspect ratio) 2560×1440 pixel resolution, 518 ppi
- Connectivity: List: Wi-Fi: 802.11 a/b/g/n/ac (2.4/5 GHz); Wi-Fi Direct; Wi-Fi hotspot; DLNA; Miracast; GPS/GLONASS/; BeiDou; NFC; Bluetooth 4.1; Infrared; USB 2.0 micro-B port; USB OTG 1.3; MHL 2.0; HDMI (TV-out, via MHL A/V link); 3.5 millimetres (0.14 in) headphone jack
- Data inputs: List: Multi-touch touch screen; 3 push buttons; Headset controls; Proximity sensor; Ambient light sensors; 3-axis gyroscope; Magnetometer; Accelerometer; Barometer; Hall-effect sensor; Gesture sensor; aGPS; GLONASS; BeiDou; RGB light sensor; S Pen (stylus/pen)
- Model: Note 4: SM-N910x (Last letter varies by carrier & international models); Note 4 S-LTE: SM-N916
- Development status: Discontinued

The Samsung Galaxy Note 4 is a flagship Android-based phablet-sized smartphone manufactured, developed and produced by Samsung Electronics. It was unveiled during a Samsung press conference at IFA Berlin, Samsung Unpacked 2014 Episode 2, on September 3, 2014, alongside the Galaxy Note Edge, the Gear S, the Gear Circle and the Gear VR. It was released globally in October 2014 as successor to the Samsung Galaxy Note 3.

Improvements include expanded stylus-related functionality, an optically stabilized rear camera, 1440p quad-HD filming on the front camera, significantly faster charging, revised multi-windowing, fingerprint unlocking, and BeiDou positioning. It is the last in the Galaxy Note series with an interchangeable battery, an IR blaster and infrared. It was the last Note model to include microSD until the arrival of the Note 7 in 2016 and the Note FE & Note 8 in 2017. Its subsequent model, the Galaxy Note 5, was unveiled on August 13, 2015.

== Specifications ==
=== Hardware ===
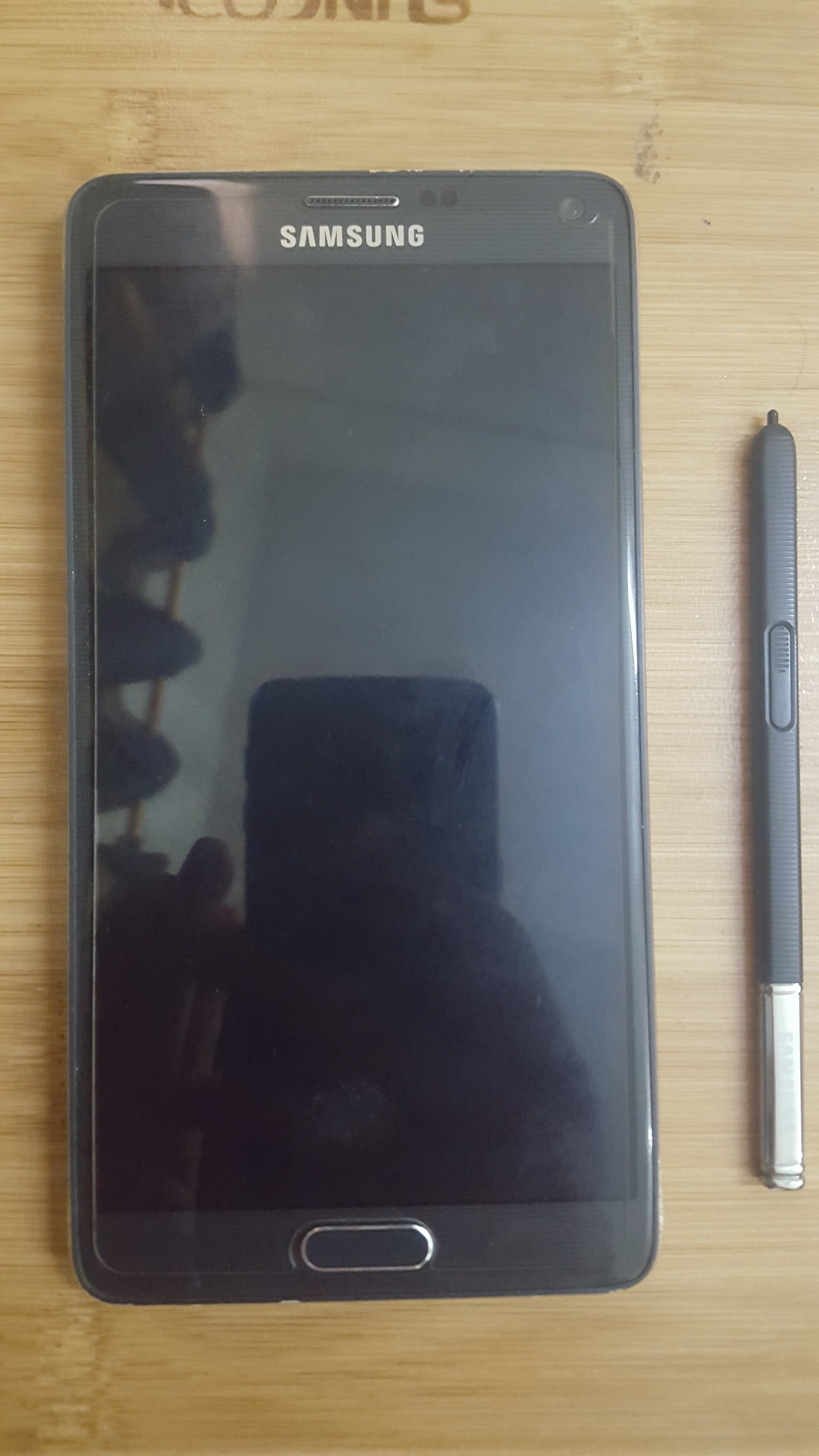
The Note 4 features an advanced S Pen with more features.

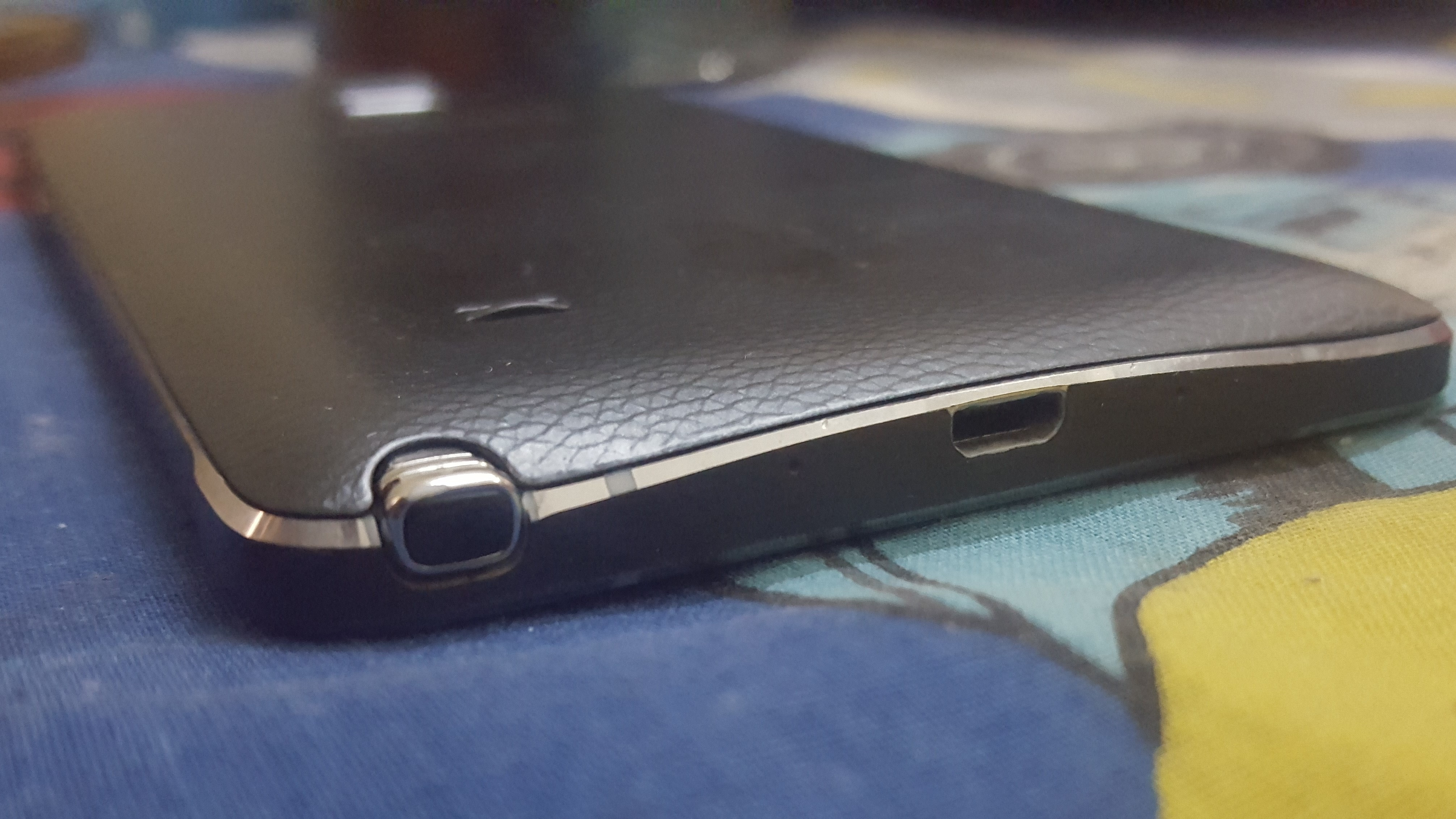
Note 4 is the first Galaxy phone to feature adaptive fast charging capability (up to 15 W).

==== Display ====
The Galaxy Note 4 features a 2560×1440 Quad HD (“WQHD”) Super AMOLED 5.7-inch display with 2.5D damage-resistant Gorilla Glass 4 and provides a pixel density of 515 ppi (pixels-per-inch).

==== Chipsets ====
The Note 4 came in two variants, one powered by a 2.7 GHz quad-core Qualcomm Snapdragon 805 chipset with Adreno 420 GPU, the other powered by Samsung's ARMv8-A Exynos 7 Octa SoC with two clusters of four cores; four Cortex-A57 cores at 1.9 GHz, and four Cortex-A53 cores at 1.3 GHz, which is the same processor cluster sold for the Samsung Galaxy Note 3 in markets that mostly use or only have 3G (such as HSUPA and HSPA), and/or '2G', such as unaltered GSM and CDMA networks, similar to how the Galaxy Note 3 is sold. The phone has an aluminum frame with a plastic, faux leather back cover.

==== Connectivity ====
Both devices that use 4G, LTE/LTE-A and Hybrid 4G LTE Networks were only sold in Canada, Australia, the U.S., the United Kingdom (for some carriers), Sweden, Norway, Denmark, and South Korea, which have widespread 4G LTE Markets, or are solely 4G/LTE/LTE-A dependant such as Canada and Denmark, which did not use any 3G or older networks, except for HSUPA (Used as a fall back network should the signal strength be weak due to being underground or in the middle of a building), as well as HSPA+, which is a 3G network, though considered by some to be the Original 4G. The GPU in charge in the Exynos chipset is the Mali-T760.

The Chinese variant utilizes the TD-LTE and TD-SCDMA Plus Network.

==== Storage ====
Both variants came with 3 GB of LPDDR3 RAM and 32 GB of internal memory that can be expanded using MicroSD-XC cards.

The memory card slot has been relocated to allow hot swapping without physical blockage by the battery.

==== Design ====
The Note 4's back-cover has a strong resemblance to the Note 3, with a faux leather texture (although without the simulated stitching). It has a new aluminum frame design, bearing resemblance from the Galaxy Alpha, but lacks an IP67 certification (water and dust resistance), which was present in Samsung's other flagship, the Galaxy S5, released half a year earlier.

==== Stylus ====
Like the predecessors, the Note 4 also includes a stylus pen, branded S Pen, incorporated into the design. Samsung touted new S Pen features including tilt and rotation recognition but these features were either not implemented or not supported.

The Wacom digitizer has been upgraded to be able to distinguish between 2048 pressure sensitivity levels, twice as much as the predecessor.

The Scrapbook feature introduced on the Galaxy Note 3 has been extended by a so-called Intelligent Selection feature that allows for optical character recognition of highlighted screen areas.

==== Battery ====
The Note 4 also incorporates a user-removable 3,220 mAh lithium-ion battery. It is the last Samsung flagship to be equipped with a user-replaceable battery.

The device is the first flagship phone by Samsung to support Qualcomm Quick Charge 2.0 for fast charging up to 15 W.

The Note 4 features a USB 2.0 charging port instead of USB 3.0 (as was in the Note 3 and S5), in favor of a new feature called Fast Charge, which Samsung claims can charge the phone from 0% to 50% in about 30 minutes and from 0% to 100% in less than 100 minutes.

With the wireless charging rear cover accessory, which exists in both a plain rear cover form factor and an S View flip cover (or S Charger View) form factor, the battery can be charged wirelessly using Qi technology.

==== Miscellaneous ====
The Galaxy Note 4 uniquely features an ultraviolet ray measurement sensor.

Like the Galaxy S5, it is also equipped with heart-rate monitor, oximeter, among other, more common sensors (barometer, digital compass, front-facing proximity sensor, accelerometer, gyroscope). However, the Note 4 lacks the thermometer and hygrometer sensors which the Galaxy S4 and Galaxy Note 3 from 2013 were equipped with.

The Air View feature is no longer useable with fingers like it is on the S4, Note 3, S5 and Alpha. However, it is still usable with the stylus.

The capacitive key on the left side of the home button is now a task key, whereas it has been a menu key for previous Galaxy Note series models. However, holding the task key for one second simulates a press of the menu key.

Unlike its successor, the Galaxy Note 4 supports Mobile High-Definition Link (MHL), which can be used to connect the mobile phone to an HDMI display.

Next to the wireless charging S View cover, another accessory for the device is the LED flip wallet (or LED dot case), which allows displaying the clock time through barely visible small pin holes on the front cover while closed.

==== S View cover ====
The S View cover, a horizontal flip case with preview window, shares the functionality of the predecessor's, except the ability to create Action Memos (digital post-it notes) without unfolding the cover.

A flashlight shortcut, optional analogue clock designs (next to the default, digital clock), as well as the ability to record video, a shortcut to dial contacts (phone numbers) marked as favourite, and access to the heart rate monitor, all without opening the cover, have been added.

=== Software ===
The Galaxy Note 4 originally shipped with Google's mobile operating system, Android, specifically version 4.4.4, with its user interface modified with Samsung's custom skin named TouchWiz Nature UX 3.5. The Note 4 contains most of the original Note's software features and functions, but also adds more significant upgrades from the predecessors, such as a new multitasking interface, expanded S Pen functions, gestures, and refreshed menus and icons.

However, some Samsung Smart Screen and air gesture control functionality which was present on the Galaxy S4, Galaxy Note 3, Galaxy S5 and Galaxy Alpha, including Air Browse, Smart Pause, Smart Scroll and Air Call Accept, has been removed.

==== Software updates ====
The device can be updated to Android 5.0.1 Lollipop in many regions, bringing a new, refined UI, and new runtime. This version has been criticized for poor battery life. A further update to 5.1.1 is available, depending on the wireless carrier.

Most Note 4 devices can also be updated to Android 6.0.1 Marshmallow, bringing Android features like Android Doze (a feature introduced in Marshmallow that saves battery life) and greater control over app permissions to the device. The Note 4 TouchWiz UI was also evolved featuring the home screen icon pack known from the Galaxy S6 and also features new S Pen features known from the Galaxy Note 5 such as the new Air command menu design with custom shortcuts and Screen-off memo. However, the UI is still very similar to the previous UI and slightly similar to the S6 UI, but most of the TouchWiz UI resembles the original UI for the Note 4.

==== Multi-window ====
The new multitasking interface merges the Galaxy Note 3's “S Pen window” feature and the split-screen feature known from the Galaxy Note 2, Galaxy S4, Galaxy Note 3 and Galaxy S5, into one feature. Applications (including the camera application) can be transitioned from floating pop-up view to flexible split-screen view and vice versa, and can be put from normal into pop-up view by dragging diagonally from an upper corner.

==== Gallery software ====
The Galaxy Note 4 uses a gallery software very similar to that of the Galaxy S5, with support for functionality such as "Shot & More" and "Selective Focus". Additional camera modes can be downloaded from a store provided by Samsung.

The gallery software is compatible with the Air View feature that allows previewing photos from albums when hovering the stylus above it.

User reports suggest that the Exif (meta data) viewer has been removed from Galaxy Note 4.

=== Camera ===
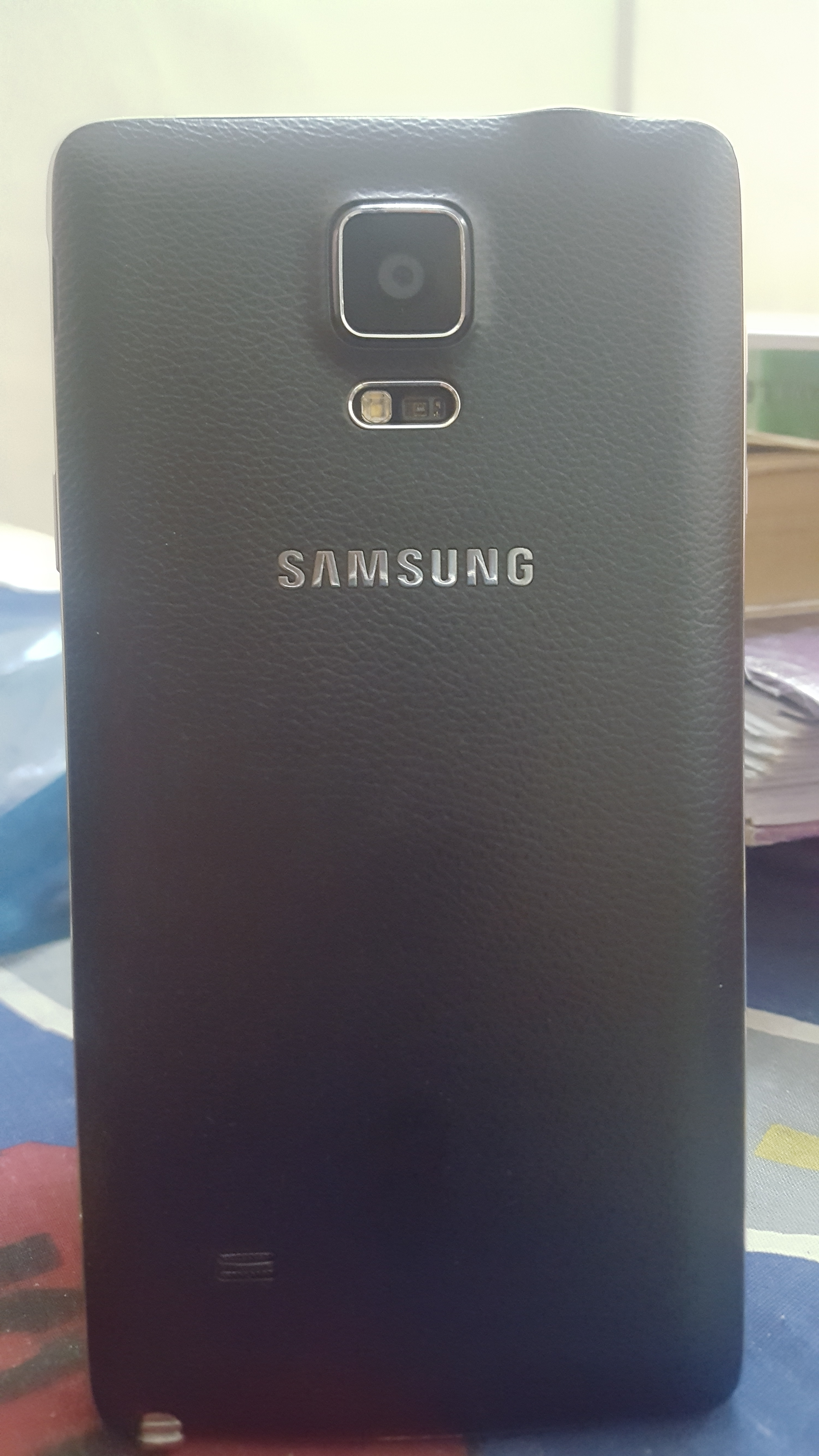
Rear of Note 4 featuring Camera, Flash and Heart Rate Monitor

The main (rear-facing) camera is a 16-megapixel (5312×2988) autofocus camera with 16:9 aspect ratio image sensor (Sony Exmor RS IMX240), featuring Smart OIS (optical image stabilization + software image stabilization), being the first mobile phone of the Samsung Galaxy Note series and the first original variant Samsung flagship phone to feature an optically stabilized rear camera.

It allows optically stabilized 4K (2160p) video recording at 30 fps, 1080p video recording with 30 fps and 60 fps (Smooth Motion) options and also 120 fps slow-motion video recording in 720p resolution. An option for 1440p video has been added in the camera software. Like the Galaxy S5, its rear camera supports high dynamic range (HDR) video recording with up to 1080p at 30 fps.

While the camera software and user interface is largely inherited from the Galaxy S5, some changes have been made. Digital zoom is allowed up to 8x, twice as much as on the S5 and Note 3. The option to separately preserve the standard dynamic range version from high dynamic range (HDR) photographs and the Wi-Fi Direct remote viewfinder have been removed.

The secondary (front-facing) camera is a 3.7 MP camera with a f1.9 aperture that can record 2560×1440 QHD videos and capture wide-angle pictures.

The Galaxy Note 4's front camera is the first front camera in any mobile phone that is able to record videos at 1440p (WQHD) resolution.

After the LG G3, the Galaxy Note 4 is the second mobile phone to be able to record optically stabilized 2160p (4K) video.

== Sales ==
The Galaxy Note 4 was released around the start of October 2014 and was available in most major markets by the middle of October. The first regions to receive the device were South Korea and China where it gained huge popularity. In the first month only, the Galaxy Note 4 reportedly sold 4.5 million units, which is a little less than its predecessor, the Galaxy Note 3, which was able to report 5 million sales in the first month after release. Samsung says that sales of the Note 4 were lower than those of the Note 3 at launch because the Note 4 was initially unavailable in some major international markets due to manufacturing issues, delaying release until early November in markets including the United Kingdom and India.

== Plug-in for Samsung Gear VR ==
Galaxy Note 4 is the first generation of Galaxy phones that has the ability to connect to the Gear VR and only Snapdragon variants of the Galaxy Note 4, sold by US and European mobile carriers, can be plugged into the Samsung Gear VR headset, which was created in partnership with Oculus VR.

== Reception ==
The phone was met with critical acclaim. When the Note 4 was released in late 2014, DisplayMate measured the performance of the display and said it was the best performing smartphone display ever tested and raised the bar for display performance.

Note 4s were used to film Cai Lan Gong, the world's first feature film shot with a smartphone at 4K resolution.

== Issues ==
=== eMMC class action ===
Many users reported that their Snapdragon Note 4 phones failed to boot with the error of "mmc_read failed". Some of them are reporting that the problem only occurs after the OTA Marshmallow update, but the other said that even without the update, they also got the same error. Related with this boot error, the same affected phones may freeze and eventually reboot after the screen locked, and in severe cases, reboot randomly during usage. A workaround of preventing the CPU from going into deep sleep is available. A class action lawsuit against Samsung about the eMMC problem in the United States is pending.

=== Battery recall ===
Batteries are being recalled for overheating risk from counterfeit batteries that were installed on devices refurbished by AT&T.

== Successors ==
The Samsung Galaxy Note 5 (branded and marketed as Samsung Galaxy Note 5) is an Android-based phablet-sized smartphone developed and produced by Samsung Electronics. The Galaxy Note 5, along with the Galaxy S6 Edge+, was unveiled during a Samsung press conference in New York City on 13 August 2015. It is the successor to the Samsung Galaxy Note 4. The phone became available in the U.S. on 21 August 2015.

In Europe, the successor to the Note 4 is the Galaxy Note 8, as the Note 5 was never released in that region, and the Note 7 was withdrawn from sales due to battery fire hazard.

Preceded by Samsung Galaxy Note 3 Samsung Galaxy Note 3 Neo	Samsung Galaxy Note 4; 2014	Succeeded by Samsung Galaxy Note 5
