= Samsung Galaxy S5 Mini =

2014 mid-range smartphone by Samsung Electronics

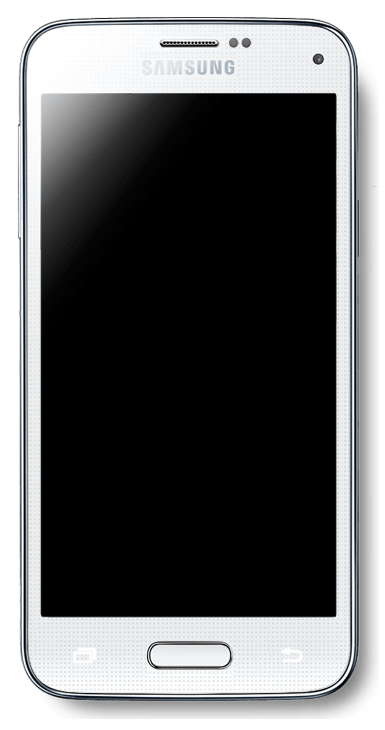
- Galaxy S5 Mini in Shimmery White
- Brand: Samsung
- Manufacturer: Samsung Electronics
- Type: Smartphone
- Series: Galaxy
- First released: July 2014; 12 years ago
- Predecessor: Samsung Galaxy S4 Mini
- Successor: Samsung Galaxy Alpha; Samsung Galaxy A3; Samsung Galaxy A5; Samsung Galaxy A7
- Related: Samsung Galaxy S5; Samsung Galaxy K Zoom; Samsung Galaxy Note 4 Samsung Galaxy Note Edge; Samsung Galaxy Alpha
- Compatible networks: (GSM/GPRS/EDGE): 850, 900, 1,800 and 1,900 MHz; 3G (HSDPA 42.2 Mbit/s, HSUPA 5.76 Mbit/s): 850, 900, 1,900 and 2,100 MHz; LTE: 800, 850, 900, 1,800, 2,100 and 2,600 MHz
- Form factor: Slate
- Dimensions: 131.1 mm (5.16 in) H 64.8 mm (2.55 in) W 9.1 mm (0.36 in) D
- Weight: 120 g (4.2 oz)
- Operating system: Original: Android 4.4.2 "KitKat"; Current: Android 6.0.1 "Marshmallow"
- System-on-chip: Samsung Exynos 3 Quad 3470 (SM-G800F, SM-G800M and SM-G800Y); Qualcomm Snapdragon 400 MSM8228 (SM-G800A, SM-G800H and SM-G800R4)
- CPU: 1.4 GHz quad-core Cortex-A7
- GPU: ARM Mali 400MP4 (SM-G800F); Adreno 305 (SM-G800A & SM-G800H)
- Memory: 1.5 GB LPDDR3 RAM
- Storage: 16 GB
- Removable storage: microSDXC up to 64 GB
- Battery: 2100 mAh Li-ion
- Rear camera: 8 megapixels (3264x2448 px) List: 8 megapixels back-side illuminated sensor; LED flash; HD video (1080p) at 30 frames/s (fps); Autofocus; Zero shutter lag; Simultaneous HD video and image recording; Selective focus; Smile and face detection; Image stabilization; Exposure compensation; White balance presets; Digital zoom; HDR; Panorama; Self-timer; Voice activation
- Front camera: 2.1 megapixels (1080p) HD video recording @ 30 fps
- Display: 4.5 in (110 mm) 1280x720 px (326 ppi) HD Super AMOLED
- Connectivity: List: Wi-Fi 2.4 & 5 GHz; Wi-Fi Direct; Wi-Fi hotspot; DLNA; GPS/GLONASS; NFC; Bluetooth 4.0 BLE; Water Resistant; IR Remote; USB 2.0 (Micro-B port, USB charging); USB OTG; 3.50 mm (0.138 in) headphone jack
- Data inputs: List: Fingerprint recognition; Heart rate sensor; Motion Coprocessor; Accelerometer; Gesture sensor; Gyroscope; Proximity sensor; Compass; Barometer; Hall-effect sensor; Magnetic sensor; RGB ambient light; Infrared (IR) LED sensor; Temperature sensor
- Model: SM-G800A, SM-G800F, SM-G800H, SM-G800H/DS, SM-G800M, SM-G800Y, SM-G800R4
- SAR: SAR US (1 g): 0.63 W/kg (head) 0.82 W/kg (body); SAR EU (10 g): 0.97 W/kg (head) 0.56 W/kg (body)
- Website: www.samsung.com/uk/consumer/mobile-devices/smartphones/android/SM-G800FZKABTU

The Samsung Galaxy S5 Mini is an Android-based smartphone developed by Samsung Electronics. It was announced in May 2014 and released on July 1, 2014. The S5 Mini is a mid-range model of its flagship Galaxy S5 smartphone and a successor to the Galaxy S4 Mini. It competes with the HTC One Mini 2 and the Sony Xperia Z1 Compact. It has a similar design and software features to its high-end counterpart, the Galaxy S5. It was the final model in the Galaxy S "mini" line, before the line was discontinued in favor for the Galaxy Alpha and later the Galaxy A series.

== Specifications ==
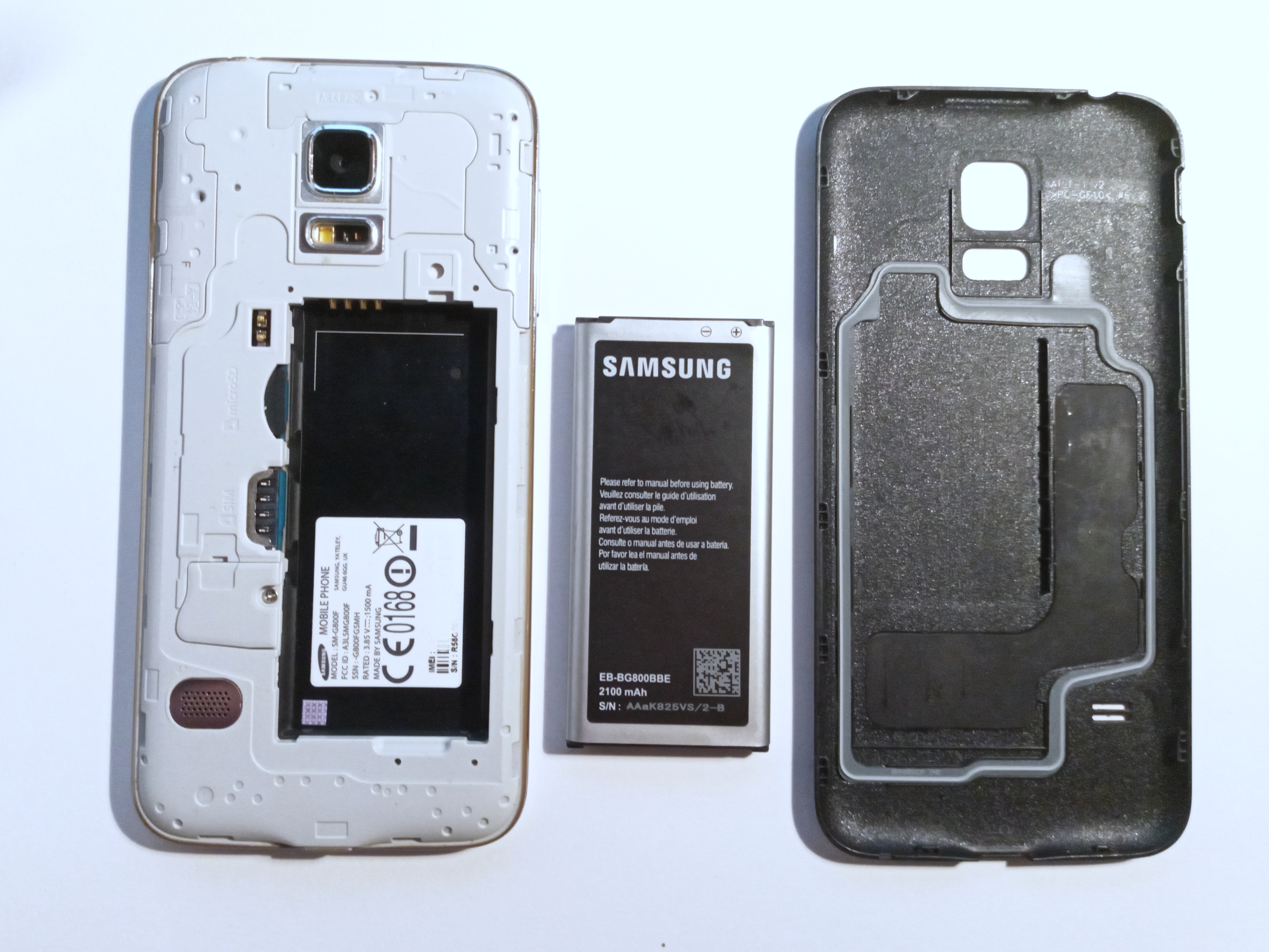
Samsung Galaxy S5 mini reverse side with battery and lid

The S5 Mini uses an almost identical variant of the S5's polycarbonate perforated faux-leather hardware design. Internally, it features a quad-core 1.4 GHz Exynos 3 Quad 3470 (for the SM-G800F, SM-G800M and SM-G800Y) or an equally-clocked Qualcomm Snapdragon 400 MSM8228 (for SM-G800A, SM-G800H and SM-G800R4) processor with 1.5 GB of RAM (of which approximately 277 MB is reserved for the system), 16 GB of expandable storage, and a 4.5 inch (1280x720 pixel) HD Super AMOLED screen with a pixel density of 326 PPI. The S5 Mini also includes a 2.1-megapixel front-facing camera, and an 8-megapixel rear-facing camera with 1080p video recording at 30 frames per second.

The device is claimed to be water resistant despite the exposed USB charging port, while the USB charging port of the Galaxy S5 requires to be covered by a flap to ensure water protection.

Below the screen are three buttons. The physical "Home" button in the centre contains a swipe-based fingerprint reader. The "Recent apps" (or Recent Tasks) and "Back" buttons are capacitive. Like the Galaxy S5, the Galaxy S5 mini no longer has a "Menu" key like its predecessors. It has been replaced with the Recent tasks key.

The Galaxy S5 Mini comes with Android 4.4.2 KitKat and Samsung's TouchWiz software which includes almost all of the features of the S5. While it initially ran KitKat, some models were later updated to Android 6.0.1 Marshmallow.

The S5 Mini contains a 2100 mAh, NFC-enabled battery. Its software, like the S5, also contains an "Ultra Power Saving" mode to further extend battery life; when enabled, all non-essential processes are disabled, and the screen switches to only rendering in white on black. Additional power efficiency features include R2 Semiconductor's envelope tracking to improve power amplifier efficiency thereby decreasing heat and increasing battery life.

== See also ==
- Samsung Electronics
- Samsung Galaxy
- Comparison of Samsung Galaxy S smartphones
- Samsung Galaxy S5
- Samsung Galaxy S series

Preceded by Samsung Galaxy S4 Mini	Samsung Galaxy S5 Mini; 2014	Succeeded by Samsung Galaxy Alpha
