= Samsung Galaxy S5 =

2014 flagship smartphone by Samsung Electronics

Samsung Galaxy S5 series

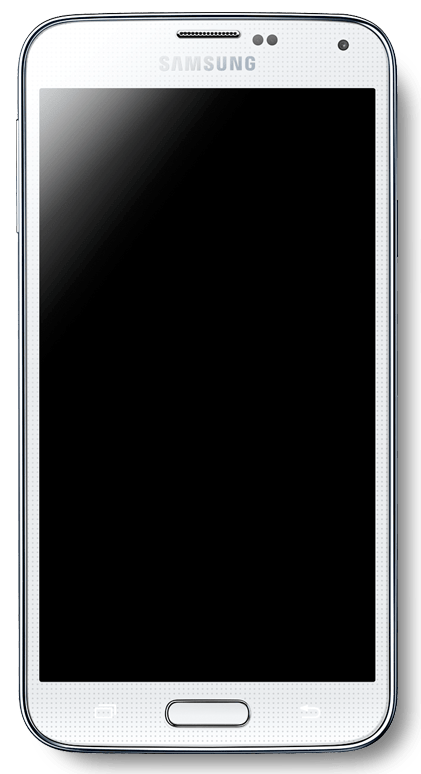
- Samsung Galaxy S5 in White
- Brand: Samsung
- Manufacturer: Samsung Electronics
- Type: Smartphone
- Series: Galaxy S
- Family: Samsung Galaxy
- First released: S5: April 11, 2014; 12 years ago S5 Active and S5 Sport: June 2014; 12 years ago S5 Neo: August 2015; 11 years ago
- Discontinued: April 30, 2015; 11 years ago
- Units sold: 12 million in first three months
- Predecessor: Samsung Galaxy S4
- Successor: Samsung Galaxy S6; Samsung Galaxy S10e/S10 Lite (for S5 Neo)
- Related: Samsung Galaxy K Zoom; Samsung Galaxy S5 Mini; Samsung Galaxy Alpha; Samsung Galaxy Note 4 Samsung Galaxy Note Edge; Samsung Galaxy A3; Samsung Galaxy A5; Samsung Galaxy A7; Samsung Galaxy Xcover 3
- Compatible networks: (GSM/GPRS/EDGE): 850, 900, 1,800 and 1,900 MHz; 3G (HSDPA 42.2 Mbit/s, HSUPA 5.76 Mbit/s): 850, 900, 1,900 and 2,100 MHz; LTE: 800, 850, 900, 1,800, 2,100 and 2,600 MHz; TD-LTE & TD-SCDMA (China Mobile Plus Network)
- Form factor: Slate
- Dimensions: 142 mm (5.59 in) H 72.5 mm (2.85 in) W 8.1 mm (0.31 in) D
- Weight: 145 g (5.11 oz)
- Operating system: Original (S5/S5 Active/S5 Sport): Android 4.4.2 "KitKat" with TouchWiz Nature UX 3.0; Original (S5 Neo): Android 5.1.1 "Lollipop" with TouchWiz Noble UX; Current (S5/S5 Active/S5 Sport): Android 6.0.1 with TouchWiz Nature UX 4.5; Current (S5 Neo): Android 7.0 "Nougat" with Samsung Experience 8.1; Unofficial (S5/S5 Active/S5 Sport): Android 14 via LineageOS 21; Unofficial (S5 Neo): Android 12 via LineageOS 19.1
- System-on-chip: Samsung Exynos 5 Octa 5422; LTE: Qualcomm Snapdragon 801; LTE-A: Qualcomm Snapdragon 805
- CPU: 2.1 GHz quad-core Cortex-A15 and 1.5 GHz quad-core Cortex-A7 (big.LITTLE); LTE versions: 2.5 GHz quad-core Krait 400; LTE-A versions: 2.7 GHz quad-core Krait 450
- GPU: ARM Mali T628MP6; LTE versions: Adreno 330; LTE-A versions: Adreno 420
- Memory: 2 GB LPDDR3 RAM; 3 GB LPDDR3 RAM (broadband LTE-A variants)
- Storage: 16/32 GB eMMC 5.0
- Removable storage: microSD up to 512 GB
- Battery: Removable 2800‑mAh Li-ion
- Rear camera: Samsung S5K2P2XX ISOCELL 16 MP; 1/2.6 -inch 16 MP (5312×2988) BSI sensor ƒ/2.2 aperture 31 mm focal length 2160p at 30 fps (limited at 5 mins), 1080p at 30/60 fps, 720p at 30/60 fps, slow motion video recording at 720p at 120 fps List: LED flash; Autofocus; Zero shutter lag; Simultaneous HD video and image recording; Selective focus; Smile and face detection; Image stabilization; Exposure compensation; White balance presets; Digital zoom; HDR; Panorama; Self-timer; Voice activation
- Front camera: 2.03 megapixels (1080p) HD video recording @ 30 fps back-illuminated sensor (type: S5K8B1YX03)
- Display: 5.1 in (130 mm) 1080p (432 ppi) Super AMOLED (Diamond PenTile); Gorilla Glass 3
- Connectivity: List: Wi-Fi: 802.11 a/b/g/n/ac (2.4/5 GHz); Wi-Fi Direct; Wi-Fi hotspot; DLNA; GPS/GLONASS; NFC; Bluetooth 4.0 BLE; IR blaster; USB 3.0 (Micro-B port, USB charging) USB OTG; 3.50 mm (0.138 in) headphone jack
- Data inputs: List: Optical fingerprint scanner; Heart rate sensor; Accelerometer; Gesture sensor; Gyroscope; Proximity sensor; Compass; Barometer; Hall-effect sensor; Magnetic sensor; RGB ambient light; Infrared (IR) LED sensor
- Water resistance: IP67 (1m for up to 30 min)
- Model: SM-G800 models (Mini); SM-G870A (Active); SM-G900A (AT&T); SM-G900F (International); SM-G900FD (Duos)e; SM-G900H (HSPA); SM-G900P (Sprint); SM-G900T (T-Mobile); SM-G901F (LTE-A); SM-G900V (Verizon); SM-G900W8 (Canada); SM-G900S (SKT LTE-A); SM-G906S (SKT Broadband LTE-A); SM-G900K (Olleh LTE-A); SM-G906K (Olleh Broadband LTE-A); SM-G900L (LGU+ LTE-A); SM-G906L (LGU+ Broadband LTE-A); SM-G903F (Neo); SM-G900R4 (US Cellular)
- Codename: klte
- Development status: Discontinued
- Website: Website

The Samsung Galaxy S5 is a flagship Android-based smartphone manufactured, developed, produced, designed and marketed by Samsung Electronics, as part of the Galaxy S series. It was announced on February 24, 2014 at the Samsung Unpacked for the Mobile World Congress in Barcelona, Spain, alongside the Gear 2, the Gear 2 Neo and the Gear Fit, and released on April 11, 2014 in 150 countries as the immediate successor to the Galaxy S4.

As with the S4, the S5 is an evolution of the prior year's model, placing a particular emphasis on an improved build with a textured rear cover, IP67 certification for dust and water resistance, a more refined user experience, new security features such as a fingerprint reader and private mode, expanded health-related features including a built-in heart rate monitor, a USB 3.0 port, and an updated camera featuring speedy auto-focus through phase-detection. The video resolution has been upgraded to 2160p (4K) and the frame rate at 1080p has been doubled to 60 for a smooth appearance.

The Galaxy S5 received mostly positive reviews; the phone was praised for its display, hardware, camera, long battery life, and incorporating water resistance while retaining a removable battery and microSD card slot, making it the final in its series with the former. However, the S5 was criticized for bloatware, its unresponsive fingerprint scanner, and its ostensibly non-"premium" polycarbonate in light of rival smartphones' metal or glass bodies. It was also the last in the Galaxy S series to have a microSD card slot until the arrival of the Galaxy S7 in 2016.

In August 2015, following the release of its then-latest flagship, the Galaxy S6, Samsung released an updated version called the "Galaxy S5 Neo" which has an Exynos 7 Octa (7580) processor clocked at 1.6 GHz. It has 2 GB of RAM, 16 GB of internal storage, USB 2.0 port, comes with Android 5.1.1 "Lollipop", and lacks fingerprint unlocking and 4K (2160p) video recording.

The Galaxy S5 is the last Galaxy S series phone with a plastic frame and a user-replaceable battery and it introduced the "SM-G9xx" model number format where it is classified on its successors such as the Galaxy S6. This would be used up until the Galaxy S21 series as Samsung would then adopt the "SM-S123X" format as a model classification format for future phones, starting with the Galaxy S22 series released on February 25, 2022.

== Release ==
The Galaxy S5 was unveiled on February 24, 2014 as part of the company's presentation at Mobile World Congress in Barcelona, Spain. Samsung Electronics president Shin Jong-kyun explained that consumers did not want a phone dependent on "eye-popping" or "complex" technology, but one with "beautiful design and performance", a "simple, yet powerful camera", "faster and seamless connectivity", and fitness-oriented features.

A dedicated capacitive touch-based camera shutter button on the upper right edge (in horizontal orientation with the home button to the right) called "side touch" was reportedly among the planned features as of February 2014, but was abandoned from the final product.

Samsung announced that it would release the S5 on April 11, 2014 in 150 countries—including the United Kingdom and United States. On 18 June 2014, Samsung unveiled an LTE-Advanced version of the S5, exclusively released in South Korea. Unlike other models, the LTE-A version also upgrades the display to a quad HD, 1440p panel.

Shortly after the release of the S5, it was discovered that some Samsung Galaxy S5 devices—particularly those on Verizon Wireless—were suffering from a major bug that caused the device's camera hardware to permanently cease functioning, and display a "Camera failed" error on-screen whenever users attempt to use the camera. Both Samsung and Verizon confirmed the issue, which affected a limited number of Galaxy S5 devices; Samsung instructed users affected by the bug to contact the company or their carrier to have their phone replaced under warranty.

== Specifications ==
=== Hardware and design ===
==== Changes ====
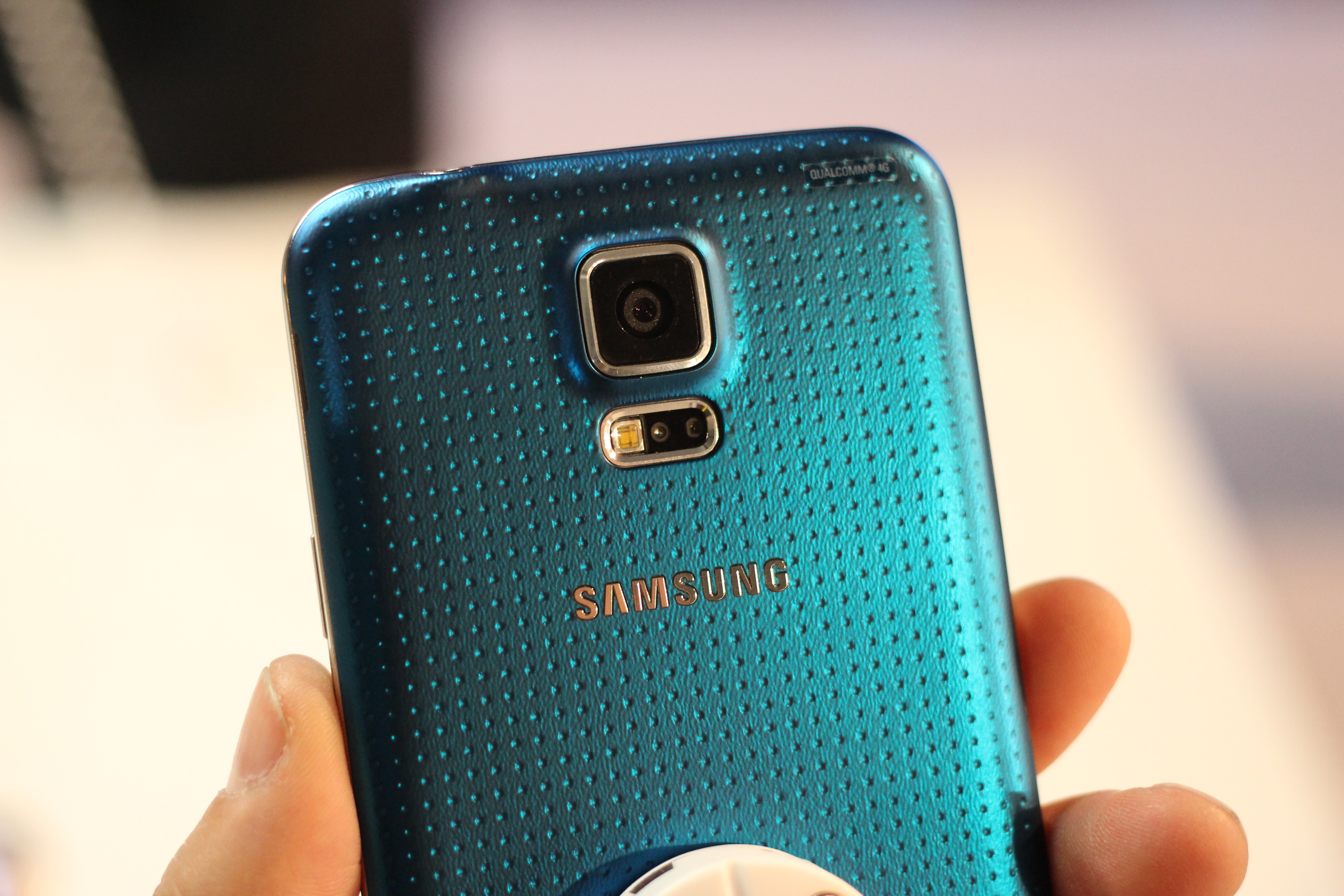
Rear of an "Electric Blue" Galaxy S5, showing the textured rear, camera, and heart rate sensor

The design of the S5 evolves upon the design of the S4. It features a rounded, polycarbonate chassis carrying a "modern glam" look with a dot pattern similar to that on the 2012 Google Nexus 7 tablet computer, faux metal trim and a removable rear cover. Unlike past models, the S5's rear cover uses a higher quality soft plastic and is dimpled to improve grip.

The S5 is IP67 certified for dust and water resistance. As such, the phone is able to be submerged in water up to 1 metre (3.3 ft) for up to 30 minutes. The S5's Micro-USB 3.0 port uses a removable cover. The S5 is available in Charcoal Black, Electric Blue, Copper Gold, and Shimmery White color finishes. The S5's screen is a 5.1-inch (130 mm) 1080p Super AMOLED panel, which is slightly larger than that of the S4, and allows for automatic brightness and gamut adjustments. Its minimum dimmable brightness level has been lowered to facilitate vision in dark environments without the need for third-party screen filter overlay apps which would interfere with screen captures.

==== Front panel ====
Below the screen are three buttons. The physical "Home" button in the center contains a swipe-based fingerprint scanner. There is a "Recent apps" key (also known as "task key") on the left side and a "Back" key on the right side of the home button. As with all main models from the Galaxy S series, the navigation buttons to the left and right of the home button are capacitive. However, in accordance with Android 4.0 human interface guidelines, the S5 no longer uses a "Menu" key like its predecessors (left side of home button), although its button layout is still reversed in comparison to other Android devices with the S5's button layout (such as the HTC One X and Galaxy Nexus, whose "Back" buttons are to the left of "Home"). However, holding the new task key for one second simulates pressing the menu key.

The S5 comes with an LED light just by the top left of the bezel, which can be set to notify the user with a blue light when calls and texts are received when the device isn't being used and the screen is turned off. It also notifies users with a red light when the phone is charging, and a blinking red light when the battery is low. This red light turns green when charged to 100% of battery capacity.

==== Camera ====
The S5 includes a 16 megapixel (5312×2988) rear-facing camera, which offers 4K (2160p) video recording at 30 fps, phase detection autofocus (which Samsung claims to be able to focus in around 0.3 seconds), real-time HDR photos and video (of which the latter is available for the first time in a Samsung flagship mobile device), a BSI CMOS image sensor with Samsung's "ISOCELL" technology, which isolates the individual pixels inside the sensor to improve its ability to capture light and reduce crosstalk. The model number of the image sensor is S5K2P2XX. Compared to conventional BSI sensors, this reduces electrical crosstalk by about 30 percent. The camera is also able to record 1080p@60fps for smoother real-time playback. It can also record slow-motion videos with 720p at 120fps, but only encoded using the menial method.

The front camera uses a Samsung CMOS S5K8B1YX03 image sensor, an aperture of f/2.4 and captures both photos and videos at 1080p; the latter at 30 frames per second.

Related section: Camera and gallery software.

=== Miscellaneous ===
Next to the camera's flash on the rear of the device is a new heart rate sensor, which can be used as part of the S Health software.

The top of the device has an IR blaster and headphone jack. The IR blaster is a transmitter only and it has a built-in database of devices that can be controlled by Samsung's Smart Remote application.

The Galaxy S5 lacks the thermometer (temperature) and hygrometer (humidity) sensors that both of Samsung's 2013 flagships, the Galaxy S4 and Galaxy Note 3 were equipped with.

==== Internal specifications ====
The S5 LTE is powered by a 2.5 GHz quad-core Snapdragon 801 system-on-chip with 2 GB of RAM. Although not mentioned during the keynote presentation, a 3G variant (SM-G900H) with an octa-core Exynos 5422 system-on-chip was also released in multiple markets. Like the previous model, it uses two clusters of four cores; four Cortex-A15 cores at 2.1 GHz, and four Cortex-A7 cores at 1.5 GHz. Depending on resource usage, the SoC can use the power-efficient A7 cores for lighter processing loads, and switch to the A15 cores for more demanding loads. Unlike previous iterations, however, the Exynos 5422 can run both sets of cores at the same time instead of only one at a time.

==== Battery ====
The S5 contains a 2800 mAh lithium ion battery, which is user-replaceable despite IP67 water resistance. It is Qi compatible (requires an optional Wireless Charging Cover) and also contains an "Ultra Power Saving" mode to further extend battery life; when enabled, all non-essential processes are disabled, and the screen switches to grey scale rendering. Samsung claims that with Ultra Power Saving on, an S5 with 10% charge remaining can last for an additional 24 hours in standby mode. Another improvement in power efficiency comes from the use of Qualcomm's envelope tracker, which reduces the power used in connectivity.

=== Software ===
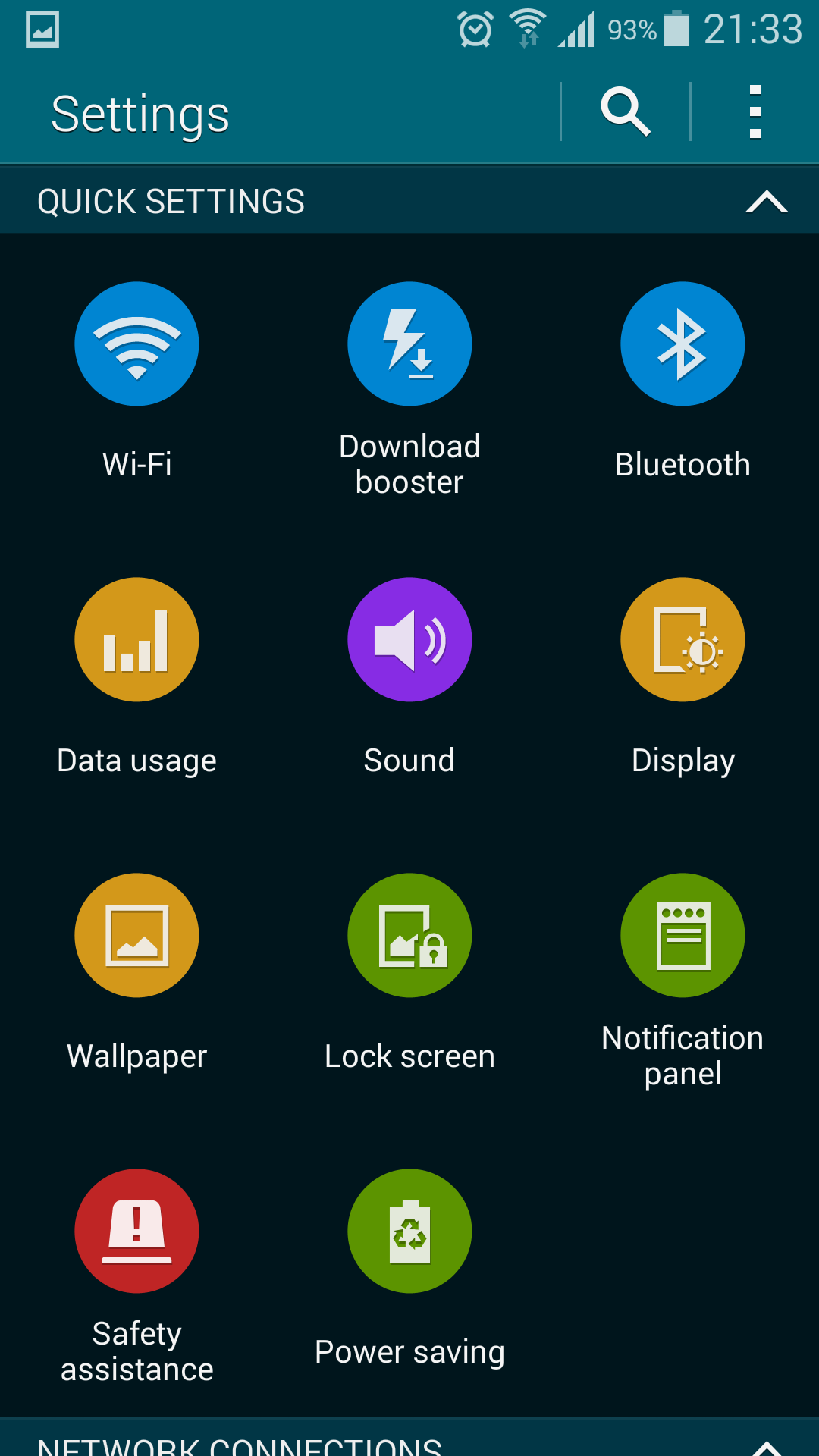
This is the "grid view" of the redesigned settings menu. The icons were made minimalistic.

The S5 shipped with Android 4.4.2 KitKat but has received updates, the most recent being 6.0.1 Marshmallow. It has Samsung's TouchWiz software, which for the S5 has a flatter, more geometric look than that found on the S4. Certain aspects of the changes were influenced by a recent patent licensing deal with Google, which requires that Samsung's TouchWiz interface follow the design of "stock" Android more closely. The S5 adds the Galaxy Note 3's "My Magazine" feature to the leftmost page on the home screen, the Settings menu was updated with a new grid-based layout with options for a "list" view and the "tabbed" view similar to that of the S4.

A "Kids' Mode" was added, and the S Health app was given expanded functionality, integrating with the new heart rate sensor on the device, alongside the new Gear 2 smartwatch and Gear Fit activity tracker. The "Download Booster" tool allows internet usage to be split across LTE and Wi-Fi to improve download speed. It is not available on the 3G model. Due to carrier policies, Download Booster was not available on Galaxy S5 models released in the United States running KitKat 4.4.2, excluding T-Mobile US and U.S. Cellular. The precluded telephone application is equipped with additional options for noise cancellation, call holding, volume boosting and the ability to personalize the call sound. A disk space analyzer tool is included.

The Galaxy S5 inherits the interaction functionality of the Galaxy S4, such as finger Air View, air gesture and motion gesture controls, and Samsung SmartScreen. For Air View, a self-capacitive touch screen layer is used to detect the floating finger. The "Quick Glance" feature from the Galaxy S4 was succeeded by "Air wake-up", where hovering above the front proximity sensor next to the "Samsung" wordmark wakes the phone up from stand-by mode rather than just showing the clock and status.

==== Security ====
The S5 contains a number of new security features. The fingerprint reader can be used to unlock the phone, while an SDK is available so third-party developers may offer fingerprint-oriented functionality in their apps; for example, PayPal integrated support for the fingerprint sensor to authenticate online purchases. The S5 also adds "Private Mode", which allows users to maintain hidden apps and file folders that cannot be accessed without additional authentication.

==== Camera and gallery software ====
The camera app was updated with a new "Shot & More" menu that captures eight still photos in quick succession stored into a single JPG file, allowing users to make edits to photos after they are taken using Samsung's gallery software. It incorporates camera features from earlier Samsung phones (Best Photo, Best Face, Drama Shot, Eraser and Action panorama) into a single camera mode. The camera software is also equipped with a new selective focus mode that captures multiple photos at different focus settings (also known as focus bracketing, albeit being stored in a single file), allowing the user to choose the desired focus setting (near focus, far focus, pan focus) any time after capture, and allows users to export the photo at the desired focus settings into a separate file.

Additional camera modes are downloadable from a store provided by Samsung.

The camera software is equipped with a remote viewfinder feature, which allows using the display of one unit as the viewfinder of a second phone paired through Wi-Fi Direct. Next to the S5, only the Galaxy S4, Galaxy S4 Zoom, Galaxy K Zoom, Galaxy Note 3 and Galaxy Alpha are equipped with this functionality.

Two new features, Virtual Tour and Spherical (360°) Panorama have been added, respectively allowing to capture photos stitched together to a navigable 3D environment and to a spherical view of the surroundings, both inside the precluded gallery software. 360-degree panoramas are navigable with both touch and gyroscope sensor (device movement).

The camera setting shortcuts on the left (horizontal) side of the screen are customizable, allowing the user to select four shortcuts to more frequently accessed camera settings.

The camera software has been criticized for over-sharpening photos in post processing.

The gallery software is able to show Exif meta data of pictures such as exposure time, exposure value, light sensitivity (ISO), aperture, focal length, flash status and a histogram.

==== Updates ====
An update to Android 5.0 "Lollipop" was first released for S5 models in Poland in December 2014. The update incorporates performance improvements, an updated "Recent apps" view that utilizes a card-based layout, access to notifications on the lock screen, and modifications to the TouchWiz interface to adhere to Material design language. In April 2016, Samsung released an update to Android 6.0.1 "Marshmallow" for international S5 models. It enables new features such as "Google Now on Tap", which allows users to perform searches within the context of information currently being displayed on-screen, and "Doze", which optimizes battery usage when the device is not being physically handled.

Using a custom ROM such as LineageOS, Android 13 can be installed on Samsung Galaxy S5 devices.

== Variants ==
=== Rugged variants ===
Samsung released two rugged versions of the S5, the S5 Active and S5 Sport. Both models feature a version of the S5's design with a full set of physical navigation buttons and do not include the fingerprint scanner, but are otherwise identical to standard models of the S5. Both devices also include an exclusive "Activity Zone" app, which contains a barometer, compass, and stopwatch. The S5 Active adds an "Active Key" to the side of the device, which can be configured to launch certain apps on short and long presses; by default, the button launches Activity Zone. The Sprint S5 Sport has additional Sprint Fit Live software, which acts as a hub for health-oriented content and S Health, along with the Under Armour-owned MapMyFitness MVP service and the music streaming service Spotify—the device comes with complimentary subscriptions to both services. Both models come in different color schemes (grey, camouflage green, and red for the S5 Active, and blue and red for the S5 Sport), and the S5 Sport is slightly lighter in weight than the S5 Active, at 158 g (5.6 oz) instead of 171 g (6.0 oz). The S5 Active and S5 Sport were released in the United States in June 2014, and are exclusive to AT&T and Sprint respectively. The S5 Active was released in Canada in October 2014.

In June 2014, Samsung also released a dual SIM version of the Galaxy S5, called Samsung Galaxy S5 Duos, model SM-G900FD. The Duos has the LTE specification of the Galaxy S5.

=== Neo variant ===
A hardware revision called the Galaxy S5 Neo was quietly released in August 2015.

The S5 Neo is a lower cost variant of the original Galaxy S5 that downgrades the SoC to an Exynos 7580 Octa system-on-chip, while improving the front camera to a 5-megapixel unit. Other changes include the removal of a fingerprint sensor and a conventional USB 2.0 port in lieu of a USB 3.0 port with a water-resistant cover, the latter of which had been a source of complaints from users who found the cover was easily broken from regular use, compared to the previous year's model. A noticeable design distinction is the finer dot pattern on the removable rear cover. Samsung also released Android 7.0 Nougat with Samsung Experience which the original S5 and its predecessor, the S4, did not have. The S5 Neo was initially made available in Europe (SM-G903F), Canada (SM-G903W), and Latin America (SM-G903M).

While the original Galaxy S5 is able to record videos at 2160p at 30fps, 1080p at 60fps and 720p at 120fps, the camera of the Galaxy S5 Neo can only record videos at 1080p at up to 30fps and lacks slow motion video recording entirely.

The Galaxy S5 Neo lacks wireless charging support entirely and cannot be retrofitted with a wireless charging back cover.

=== Comparison table ===
Model	SM-G900H	SM-G900F/FD	SM-G900I	SM-G900K/L/S	SM-G900M/MD	SM-G900W8	SM-G900T/T1	SM-G900A	SM-G900V	SM-G900R4	SM-G900P	SM-G9006W	SM-G9008V	SM-G9009D	SM-G900D (SC-04F)	SM-G900J (SCL23)
Countries	International		Asia, Australia	South Korea	International	Canada, Caribbean, Mexico	USA					China			Japan	
Carrier					Vodafone, Telcel		T-Mobile, MetroPCS	AT&T, Cricket	Verizon	US Cellular	Sprint		China Mobile	China Telecom	NTT DoCoMo	au
2G	850, 900, 1800, 1900 MHz; GSM/GPRS/EDGE								CDMA; 850, 900, 1800, 1900 MHz; GSM/GPRS/EDGE	CDMA	800, 1900 MHz; CDMA 1x	850, 900, 1800, 1900 MHz; GSM/GPRS/EDGE		800, 1900 MHz; CDMA 1x 850, 900, 1800, 1900 MHz; GSM/GPRS/EDGE	850, 900, 1800, 1900 MHz; GSM/GPRS/EDGE	800, 2100 MHz; CDMA 1x 850, 900, 1800, 1900 MHz; GSM/GPRS/EDGE
3G	850, 900, 1900, 2100 MHz; UMTS/HSPA+			850, 1900, 2100 MHz; UMTS/HSPA+	850, 900, 1700/2100, 1900, 2100 MHz; UMTS/HSPA+		850, 1700/2100, 1900, 2100 MHz; UMTS/HSPA+	850, 1900, 2100 MHz; UMTS/HSPA+	800, 1900 MHz; EVDO Rev.A; 850, 900, 1900, 2100 MHz; UMTS/HSPA+	800, 1700, 1900 MHz; EVDO Rev.A	800, 1900 MHz; EVDO Rev.A	850, 900, 1900, 2100 MHz; UMTS/HSPA+	1880, 2010 MHz; TD-SCDMA	800, 1900 MHz; EVDO Rev.A; 850, 1900, 2100 MHz; UMTS/HSPA+	800, 850, 2100 MHz; UMTS/HSPA+	850, 1900, 2100 MHz; UMTS/HSPA+
4G (Band)	No	800 (20), 850 (5), 900 (8), 1800 (3), 1900 (2), 2100 (1), 2600 (7) MHz; LTE-A	700 (28), 850 (5), 900 (8), 1800 (3), 1900 (2), 2100 (1), 2300 (40), 2600 (7) MHz; LTE-A	850 (5), 1800 (3), 2100 (1), 2600 (7) MHz; LTE-A	700 (17), 850 (5), 1700/2100 (4), 1900 (2), 2600 (7) MHz; LTE-A	700 (17), 850 (5), 1700/2100 (4), 1800 (3), 1900 (2), 2600 (7) MHz; LTE-A	700 (17), 850 (5), 900 (8), 1700/2100 (4), 1800 (3), 1900 (2), 2100 (1), 2600 (7) MHz; LTE-A	700 (17), 850 (5), 1700/2100 (4), 1800 (3), 1900 (2), 2100 (1), 2600 (7) MHz; LTE-A	700 (13), 1800 (3), 1700/2100 (4) MHz; LTE-A	700 (12 & 17), 850 (5), 1700/2100 (4), 1900 (2) MHz; LTE-A	800 (26), 1900 (25), 2500 (41) MHz; LTE-A	2500 (41) MHz; LTE-A	1900 (39), 2300 (40), 2500 (41) MHz; LTE-A	No	800 (19), 1500 (21) 1800 (3), 2100 (1) MHz; LTE-A	700 (17), 800 (18), 1800 (3), 2100 (1) MHz; LTE-A; 2500 (41); WiMax
Dimensions	142 x 72.5 x 8.1 mm														142 x 72.5 x 8.3 mm	
Weight	145 g						151 g	145 g	150 g	145 g			146 g		147 g	
SoC	Exynos 5 Octa 5422	Snapdragon 801 MSM8974Pro-AC														
GPU	Mali-T628 MP6	Adreno 330														
Internal storage	16 GB			32 GB			16 GB						32 GB			
SIM slots	1	1/2	1		1/2	1								2	1	

== Reception ==
=== Critical reception ===
The S5 received mostly positive reviews; critics acknowledged that the S5 was primarily a technological evolution of its predecessor with few changes of significance. Although praised for an improved appearance and build quality, the design of the S5 was panned for retaining a nearly identical appearance and construction to the S4, (Note: Actually, the design has noticeable changes. The back cover has no more glossy polycarbonate and has a new dot pattern, similar to the Google Nexus 7-2012.) and for not using higher quality materials such as metal or a higher-quality plastic. The display of the S5 was praised for having a high quality, not being as oversaturated as previous models, and having a wide range of viewing angles, brightness states, and gamut settings to fine tune its appearance. TechRadar also noticed that, despite the high power of its processor, some apps and interface functions suffered from performance issues, indicating that the S5's operating system may not have been completely optimized for its system-on-chip. The S5's interface was praised for having a cleaner appearance than previous iterations—however, it was still criticized for containing too many unnecessary features and settings.

The S5's camera received mostly positive reviews for the improvements to image quality provided by its Isocell image sensor, but was deemed to still be not as good as its competitors, particularly in the case of low-light images. While the S5's camera interface was praised for having a streamlined design, it was criticized for taking too long to load, and the Selective Focus features were panned for being inconsistent in quality. While praised for providing more uses than the Touch ID function on the iPhone 5s, the fingerprint sensor was panned for requiring an unnatural vertical swiping gesture, having inconsistent and unforgiving results, and for being inconvenient in comparison to a password or PIN in most use cases due to these shortcomings. The Berlin-based Security Research Labs found that because the S5's fingerprint sensor could easily be spoofed, allows unlimited chances and does not require a PIN after 48 hours of inactivity or on startup like Touch ID, and can be used for more than just unlocking the phone, it "gives a would-be attacked [sic] an even greater incentive to learn the simple skill of spoofing fingerprints." Engadget considered the heart rate sensor to be similarly unforgiving and sometimes being inaccurate in comparison to other heart rate trackers, while The Verge felt that it was a redundant addition due to the concurrent introduction of the Samsung Gear Fit, which includes a heart rate tracker of its own, and is likely to also be purchased by those wanting to take full advantage of the S Health software on their S5.

=== Sales ===
The S5 shipped to retailers 10 million units in 25 days, making it the fastest shipping smartphone in Samsung's history. Samsung shipped 11 million units of the S5 during its first month of availability, exceeding shipped units of the S4 in the same period by 1 million units. However, 12 million units of the S5 were shipped in its first three months of availability, which is lower than the S4's sales.

Due to the lower sales of the S5, in July 2014, Samsung reported its lowest profits in over two years, and a drop in market share from 32.3% to 25.2% over the past year. The loss in market share was attributed primarily to growing pressure from competitors – especially in the growing low-end smartphone market, and an already saturated market for high-end smartphones. By the end of 2014, it was reported that sales of the S5 were 40% down on the previous S4 model, prompting management changes at Samsung.

== See also ==
- Comparison of Samsung Galaxy S smartphones
- Samsung Galaxy S series
- Samsung Rugby Smart
- Samsung Galaxy Note 4
- Samsung Galaxy Note Edge

== Notes ==
Preceded by Samsung Galaxy S4	Samsung Galaxy S5; 2014	Succeeded by Samsung Galaxy S6
