= Samsung Galaxy Note Edge =

Android-based phablet by Samsung Electronics

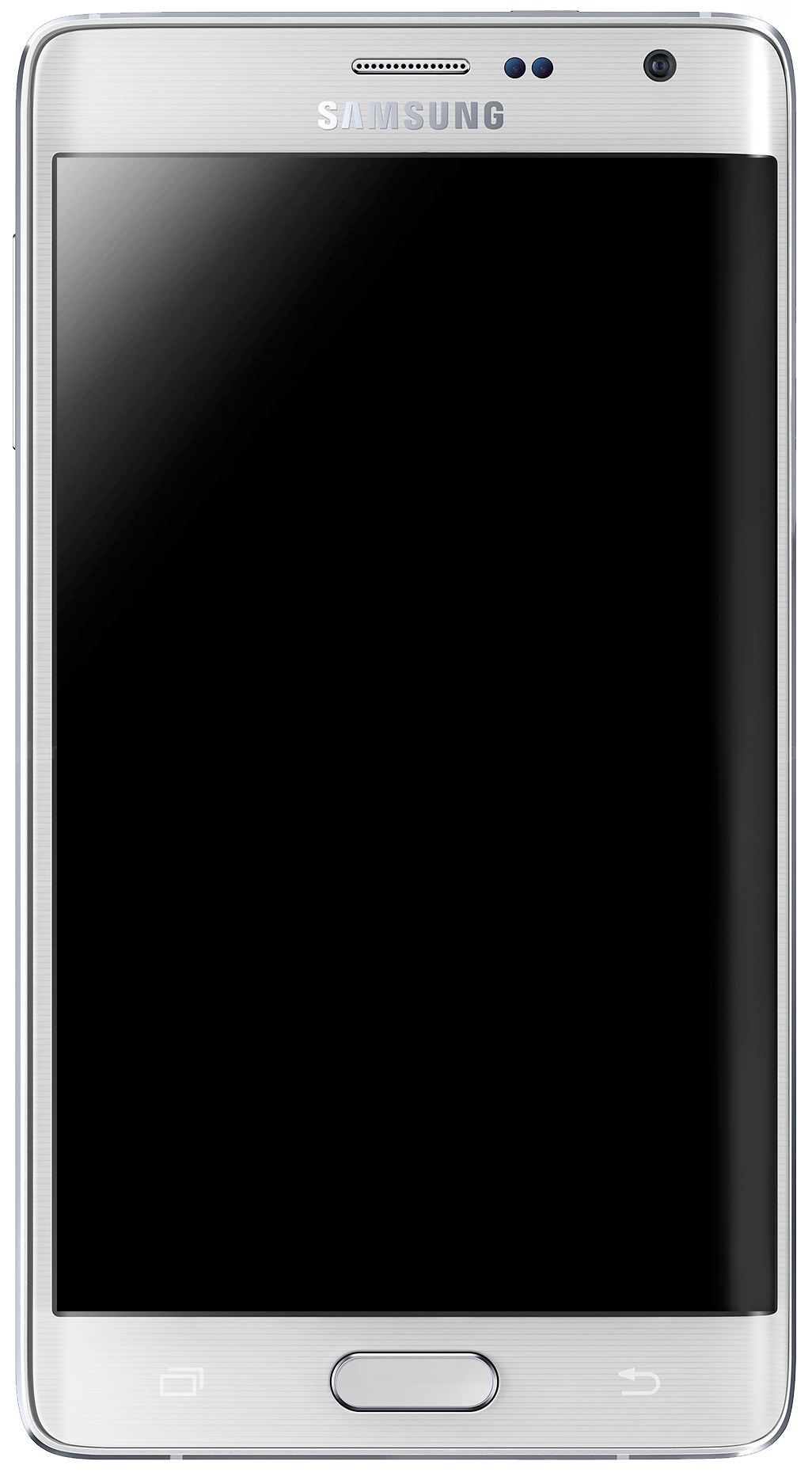
- Galaxy Note Edge, showing its curved bezel
- Brand: Samsung
- Manufacturer: Samsung Electronics
- Type: Phablet
- Series: Galaxy Note
- Family: Samsung Galaxy
- First released: November 14, 2014; 11 years ago
- Availability by region: November 14, 2014; 11 years ago
- Discontinued: August 13, 2015; 11 years ago
- Predecessor: Samsung Galaxy Round
- Successor: Samsung Galaxy S6 Edge+
- Related: Samsung Galaxy S5; Samsung Galaxy S5 Mini; Samsung Galaxy Alpha; Samsung Galaxy Note 4
- Form factor: Slate
- Dimensions: 82.4×151.3×8.3 mm (3.24×5.96×0.33 in)
- Weight: 174 g (6 oz)
- Operating system: Original: Android 4.4.4 "KitKat"; First major update: Android 5.0.1 "Lollipop"; Second major update: Android 5.1.1 "Lollipop"; Current: Android 6.0.1 "Marshmallow"; Custom: Android 11
- System-on-chip: Samsung Exynos 5 Octa 5433 (South Korea version); Qualcomm Snapdragon 805 (international version)
- CPU: Quad-core 1.3 GHz Cortex-A53 & quad-core 1.9 GHz Cortex-A57 (South Korea version); 2.7 GHz Krait 450 quad-core (international version)
- GPU: ARM Mali T760 GPU (South Korea version); Adreno 420 (international version)
- Memory: 3 GB LPDDR3
- Storage: 32/64 GB eMMC flash memory
- Removable storage: microSDXC up to 128 GB
- SIM: 1x or 2x miniSIM
- Battery: 3000 mAh user-replaceable Li-ion
- Charging: Qualcomm Quick Charge 2.0 at 15 W Qi wireless charging requires special back cover
- Rear camera: 16-megapixel BSI, with autofocus, 2160p (4K) at 30fps (limited to 5 mins), 1440p at 30fps, 1080p at 30/60fps, 720p at 30/60fps, slo-mo video recording at 720p at 120fps
- Front camera: 3.7 megapixel, 1440p/1080p/720p video recording
- Display: 142 mm (5.6 in) Super AMOLED 524 ppi 2560×1600 16:10 aspect ratio
- Connectivity: List: Wi-Fi: 802.11 a/b/g/n/ac (2.4, or 5 GHz); Wi-Fi Direct; Wi-Fi hotspot; DLNA; Miracast; GPS/GLONASS/; BeiDou; NFC; Bluetooth 4.1; Infrared; USB 2.0 micro-B port; USB OTG 1.3; MHL 3.0; HDMI (TV-out, via MHL A/V link); 3.5 mm (0.14 in) headphone jack
- Data inputs: List: Multi-touch touch screen; 3 push buttons; Headset controls; Proximity sensor; Ambient light sensors; 3-axis gyroscope; Magnetometer; Accelerometer; Barometer; Hall-effect sensor; Hygrometer; Magnetometer; Gesture sensor; aGPS; GLONASS; BeiDou; RGB light sensor; S Pen (stylus)/pen
- Development status: Discontinued

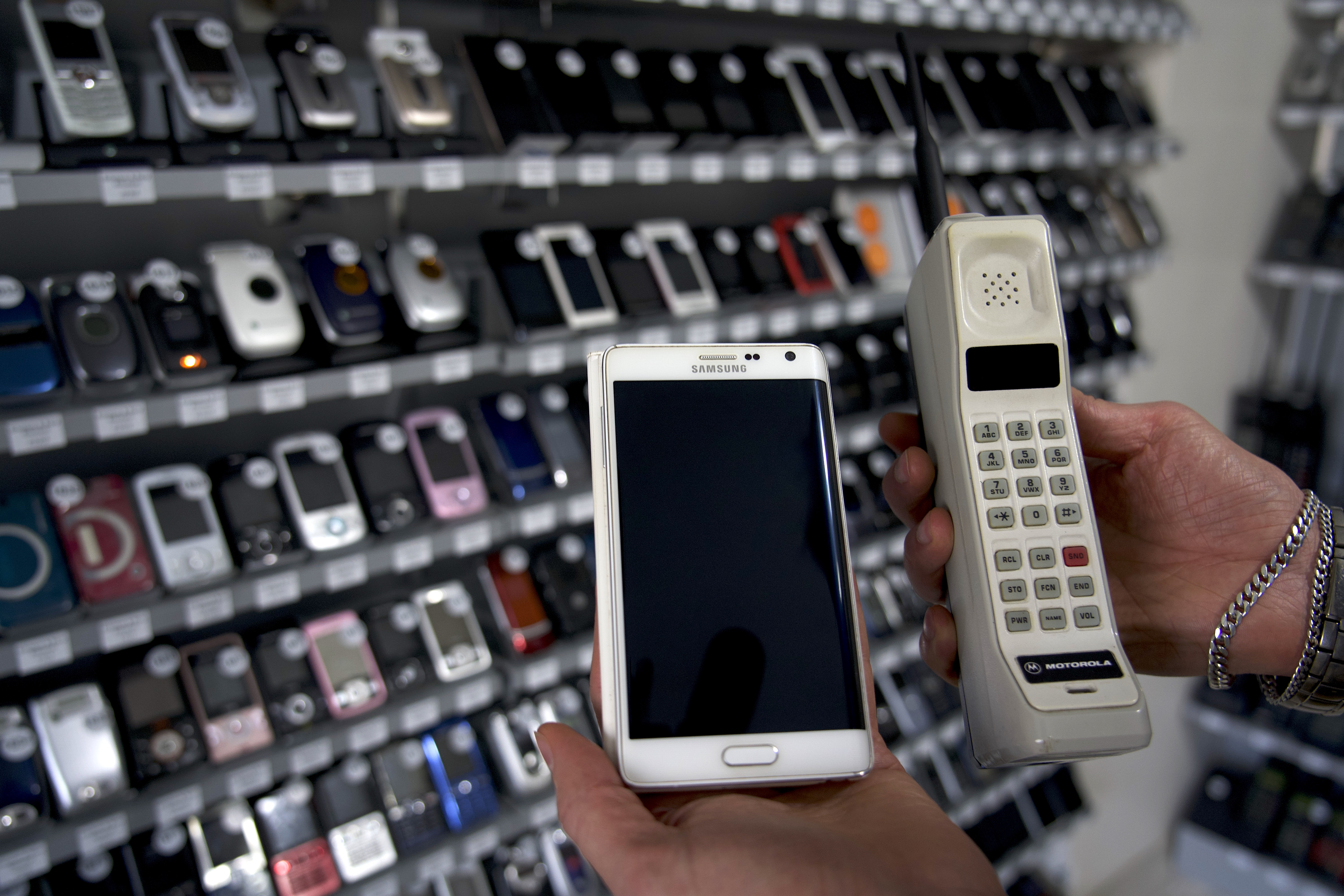
Samsung Galaxy Note Edge next to a Motorola DynaTAC

The Samsung Galaxy Note Edge is an Android-based phablet-sized smartphone manufactured and produced by Samsung Electronics. Unveiled during a Samsung press conference at IFA Berlin on September 3, 2014, alongside its sister, the Galaxy Note 4, it is distinguished by a display that curves across the right side of the device, which can be used as a sidebar to display application shortcuts, a virtual camera shutter button, notifications, and other information.

== Development and release ==
At the 2013 Consumer Electronics Show, Samsung presented "Youm"—concept prototypes for smartphones that incorporated flexible displays. One prototype had a screen curved along the right edge of the phone, while the other had a screen curved around the bottom of the phone. Samsung explained that the additional "strip" could be used to display additional information alongside apps, such as notifications or a news ticker.

The Youm concept would surface as part of the Galaxy Note Edge, which was unveiled alongside the Galaxy Note 4 on September 3, 2014. Samsung strategist Justin Denison explained that the company liked to take risks in its products, going on to say that "We're not a company that does one-offs [..] We like to do things big and get behind it."

== Specifications ==
=== Hardware and design ===
The Galaxy Note Edge is similar in design to the Galaxy Note 4 (which is in turn an evolution of the Galaxy Note 3), with a metallic frame and a plastic leather rear cover. The device features either an Exynos 5 Octa 5433 (South Korea version) or Qualcomm Snapdragon 805 (International version) system-on-chip, 3 GB of RAM, and 32 or 64 GB of expandable storage. As with other Galaxy Note series devices, it includes an S Pen stylus which can be used for pen input, drawing, and handwriting. The S Pen had been given a small upgrade with the Note Edge. Similarly to other recent Samsung flagship devices, it also includes a heart rate sensor and fingerprint scanner. The Galaxy Note Edge features a 5.6-inch "Quad HD+" Super AMOLED display, which contains an additional 160 pixel wide column that wraps around the side of the device on a curve. The device includes a 16 megapixel rear camera with a back-illuminated sensor, optical image stabilization, and 4K video recording, and a 3.7 megapixel front-facing camera.

=== Software ===
The Galaxy Note Edge ships with Android 4.4.4 "KitKat" and Samsung's TouchWiz interface and software suite, and is similar to that of the Note 4. The curved edge of the screen is used as a sidebar for various purposes: it can be used to display different panels, including shortcuts to frequent applications, displays of notifications, news, stocks, sports, social networks, playback controls for the music and video players, camera controls, data usage, and minigames. Tools are also available through the panel, including a ruler, stopwatch, timer, voice recorder, and flashlight button. A software development kit is available for developers to code panels; additional panels can be obtained through Galaxy Apps. The "Night Clock" mode allows the edge screen to, during a pre-determined timeframe, display a digital clock while not in use. Due to the nature of AMOLED displays, which render black by not turning on the pixel at all, this mode does not significantly consume battery power, but per software limitations it cannot be active for more than 12 hours at a time.

As of Mid 2016, the Galaxy Note Edge can be upgraded up to Android Marshmallow.

== Variants ==
=== Countries ===
- Europe: SM-N915FY
- Global: SM-N915F
- Asia and Australia: SM-N915G
- Canada: N915W8
- China: SM-N1950

=== South Korea carriers ===
- SK Telecom: SM-N915S
- KT: SM-N915K
- LG Uplus: SM-N915L

=== US carriers ===
- AT&T: SM-N915A
- Verizon: SM-N915V
- T-Mobile: SM-SM-N915T
- Sprint: N915P
- US Cellular: N915R4

The Note Edge was shipped to Germany after more than 120,000 people voted for it in an online poll conducted by Samsung. A "Premium Edition" with the part number "N915FZKYDBT" was launched soon after, with more accessories in the box (flip cover, memory card, "display cleaner", and an additional brochure with usage tips), as well as an extended warranty.

=== Japanese models ===
==== SC-01G ====
The SC-01G variant is a dual-mode terminal announced by NTT Docomo, featuring 3.9G network (Xi) and 3G network (FOMA). It belongs to the second generation of the Docomo Smartphone series. It was released on October 23, 2014 for the "Charcoal Black" variant and the Frost White on November 13, 2014.

==== SCL24 ====
The SCL24 is a smartphone announced by au by KDDI for the Japanese market. It is compatible with the 3.5G CDMA 1X WIN, 3.9G au 4G LTE, and 4G (au 4G LTE CA / WiMAX2+) mobile communication systems offered under the au brand by KDDI and Okinawa Cellular Telephone. It was announced on September 24, 2014 and released at the same time with NTT Docomo.
