= Samsung Galaxy S4 =

2013 flagship smartphone by Samsung Electronics

- Galaxy S4 in Frost White
- Brand: Samsung
- Manufacturer: Samsung Electronics
- Type: Smartphone
- Series: Galaxy S
- Family: Samsung Galaxy
- First released: April 27, 2013; 13 years ago
- Discontinued: April 11, 2014; 12 years ago (successor); April 11, 2017; 9 years ago (support)
- Units sold: 50 million in the first 6 months
- Units shipped: 80 million
- Predecessor: Samsung Galaxy S III
- Successor: Samsung Galaxy S5
- Related: Samsung Galaxy S4 Active; Samsung Galaxy S4 Mini; Samsung Galaxy S4 Zoom; Samsung Galaxy Note 3 Samsung Galaxy Note 3 Neo; Samsung Galaxy Round; Samsung Ativ SE
- Compatible networks: List: 2.5G GSM/GPRS/EDGE – 850, 900, 1800, 1900 MHz; 2.5G CDMA 1xRTT/1x-Advanced – 800, 1900 MHz; 3G UMTS/HSPA+ – 850, 900, 1900, 2100 MHz; 3G TD-SCDMA – 1900 / 2000 MHz; 3G CDMA Ev-DO Rev. A – 800, 1900 MHz (select carrier models also support the AWS 1700/2100 MHz band); 4G LTE Rel. 8 (UE Cat 3) – 700, 800, 1700, 1800, 1900, 2600 MHz or up to 6 different band sets (dependent on market); FDD; TDD (dual mode version); LTE-A (Cat 4) Only available on I9506 and SHV-E330
- Form factor: Slate
- Dimensions: 136.6 mm (5.38 in) H 69.8 mm (2.75 in) W 7.9 mm (0.31 in) D
- Weight: 130 g (4.6 oz)
- Operating system: Original: Android 4.2.2 "Jelly Bean" with TouchWiz Nature UX 2.0; Current: Android 5.0.1 "Lollipop" with TouchWiz Nature UX 4.0; Unofficial: up to Android 14 "Upside Down Cake" via LineageOS 21 (I9506)
- System-on-chip: Exynos 5 Octa 5410 (3G & South Korea LTE Versions); Qualcomm Snapdragon 600 (LTE & China Mobile TD-SCDMA versions)
- CPU: 1.6 GHz quad-core Cortex-A15 and 1.2 GHz quad-core Cortex-A7 (big.LITTLE) (3G & South Korea LTE Versions); 1.9 GHz quad-core Krait 300 (LTE & China Mobile TD-SCDMA versions)
- GPU: IT tri-core PowerVR SGX 544 GPU (3G & South Korea LTE Versions); Adreno 320 (LTE & China Mobile TD-SCDMA versions)
- Modem: 3G: Intel XMM6360 HSPA+ LTE: Gobi MDM9215M (Cat 3 LTE); LTE-A: Gobi MDM9x25 (Cat 4 LTE)
- Memory: 2 GB LPDDR3 RAM
- Storage: 16/32/64 GB eMMC 4.5
- Removable storage: Up to 256 GB; microSD
- SIM: 1x or 2x miniSIM
- Battery: 2600 mAh Li-ion; User replaceable Qi wireless charging (optionally retrofittable)
- Charging: USB Battery Charging 1.2 (USB-BC) up to 10 W (5 V/2 A); Qi wireless charging requires special back cover
- Rear camera: 13 megapixels Sony IMX135 (Exmor RS) List: 13 megapixels back-side illuminated sensor; LED flash; HD video (1080p) at 30 frames/s or after Modification of Snapdragon 800 only: 2160p video recording @ 30 frames/s or 1080p video recording @ 60 frames/s; Autofocus; Zero shutter lag; Simultaneous HD video and image recording; Smile and face detection; Image stabilization; Exposure compensation; White balance presets; Digital zoom; Geo tagging; High Dynamic Range mode (HDR); Panorama; Self-timer; Voice activation
- Front camera: 2 megapixels (1080p) HD Video Recording @ 30 frames/s Back-illuminated sensor
- Display: 5 in (130 mm) 1920x1080 px (441 ppi) Super AMOLED (Diamond PenTile); Corning Gorilla Glass 3
- Sound: Mono speaker on back side with Qualcomm DAC or Wolfson Microelectronics WM5102 audio chip depending on version
- Connectivity: List: Wi-Fi :802.11 a/b/g/n/ac (2.4/5 GHz); Wi-Fi Direct; Wi-Fi hotspot; DLNA; Miracast; GPS/GLONASS; NFC; Bluetooth 4.0; ANT+; Infrared; VLC; USB 2.0 (Micro-B port, USB charging); USB OTG 1.3; MHL 2.0; HDMI (TV-out, via MHL A\V link); 3.5 millimetres (0.14 in) headphone jack
- Data inputs: List: Accelerometer; Barometer; Gesture sensor; GPS; GLONASS; Gyroscope; Hall-effect sensor; Hygrometer; Magnetometer; Proximity sensor; RGB; light sensor; Thermometer
- Model: GT-I9500 (Chipset – Exynos 5 Octa 5410 CPU – Quad-core 1.6 GHz Cortex-A15 & quad-core 1.2 GHz Cortex-A7 GPU – PowerVR SGX 544MP3); GT-I9505 (Quad-core Snapdragon 600, China Mobile TD-SCDMA & LTE, Adreno 320); GT-I9506, SHV-E330S/K/L (Quad-core Snapdragon 800, LTE-A, Adreno 330); GT-I9515 Value Edition (Quad-core Snapdragon 600, LTE, Adreno 320); SHV-E300S/K/L (Korean; Exynos 5 Octa-core, LTE)
- Codename: ja3gxx for Exynos variant (I9500), jfltexx for Qualcomm variant (I9505), and ks01ltexx for LTE-A variant (I9506)
- Development status: discontinued
- SAR: List: *GT-I9500 version: US 0.85 W/kg (head) 1.55 W/kg (body) EU 0.42 W/kg (head) 0.54 W/kg (body); *GT-I9505 version: US 0.77 W/kg (head) 1.17 W/kg (body) EU 0.28 W/kg (head) 0.40 W/kg (body)
- Other: List: Wi-Fi hotspot, Samsung Link, Group Play, damage-resistant Gorilla Glass 3; Online services Google Play, Samsung Apps

The Samsung Galaxy S4 is a series of high-end Android-based smartphones manufactured and produced by Samsung Electronics as the 4th smartphone family of the Galaxy S series and was first shown publicly on March 14, 2013, at Samsung Mobile Unpacked in New York City. It is the successor to the Galaxy S III, which maintains a similar design, but with upgraded hardware, more sensors, and an increased focus on software features that take advantage of its hardware capabilities—such as the ability to detect when a finger is hovered over the screen, and expanded eye tracking functionality, it was released the previous year.

A hardware variant of the S4 became the first smartphone to support the emerging LTE Advanced mobile network standard (model number GT-I9506 and SHV-E330). The T-Mobile version of the Galaxy S4, named the model (SGH-M919), was released the same month.

The Galaxy S4 is among the earliest phones to feature a 1080p Full HD display, 1080p front camera video recording, and among few to feature temperature and humidity sensors and a touch screen able to detect a floating finger.

== Sales and shipping ==
The S4 was made available in late April 2013 on 327 carriers in 155 countries. It became Samsung's fastest selling smartphone and eventually Samsung's best-selling smartphone with 20 million sold worldwide in the first two months, and 40 million in the first six months.

In total, more than 80 million Galaxy S4 units have been sold, making it the most selling Android-powered mobile phone of all time.

== Specifications ==
=== Hardware ===
==== Comparisons ====
The Galaxy S4 uses a refined version of the hardware design introduced by the Galaxy S III, with a rounded, polycarbonate chassis and a removable rear cover. It is slightly lighter and narrower than the Galaxy S III, with a length of 136.6 mm (5.38 in), a width of 69.8 mm (2.75 in), and a thickness of 7.9 mm (0.31 in). At the bottom of the device is a microphone and a micro USB port for data connections and charging; it also supports USB-OTG and MHL 2.0. Near the top of the device are a front-facing camera, an infrared transmitter for usage as universal remote control, proximity, and ambient light sensors, and a notification LED. In particular, the infrared sensor is used for the device's "Air View" features. A headphone jack, secondary microphone and infrared blaster are located at the top. The S4 is widely available in black and white color finishes; in selected regions, Samsung also introduced versions in red, purple, pink, brown with gold trim, and light pink with gold trim. In late January 2014, Samsung's Russian website briefly listed a black model with a plastic leather backing, similar to the Galaxy Note 3, dubbed the "Galaxy S4 Black Edition". Throughout February 2014, the Korean LTE-A model received three new colors, those colors being Rose Gold White, Rose Gold Black, and Deep Black.

The S4's 5-inch (130 mm) Super AMOLED display with 1080×1920 pixels (1080p Full HD) is larger than the 4.8-inch (120 mm) 720×1280 display of its predecessor, and also features a brand new "Diamond" PenTile RGBG matrix subpixel arrangement which has a better subpixel fill-rate for any given resolution than the traditional linear RGBG PenTile layout that had been used prior (as there is less empty black space between each subpixel). The whole pixel density also increased from 306 to 441 ppi, surfaced with Corning Gorilla Glass 3. An added glove mode option increases touch sensitivity to allow detecting touch input through gloves. The Galaxy S4 is Samsung's first and one of the earliest mobile phones of all time to feature a 1080p display.

Unlike previous models, the S4 does not contain FM radio support, citing the increased use of online media outlets for content consumption on mobile devices.

==== Camera ====
Related section: Camera software

The camera of the Galaxy S4 uses a 13-megapixel Sony Exmor RS IMX135 image sensor (4128×3096), later used on the Galaxy Note 3.

While the front cameras of the Galaxy S III and Galaxy Note II, both released in 2012, are only able to capture videos at up to 720p HD resolution, the front camera of the Galaxy S4 allows 1080p Full HD video recording for the first time in any Samsung mobile phone.

The image sensor of the front camera is a Samsung CMOS S5K6B2.

==== Sensors ====
Like the Galaxy S III, the S4 is equipped with an accelerometer sensor, a gyroscope, a front-facing proximity sensor, digital compass and barometer.

Unlike its predecessor, the S4 is also equipped with a Hall sensor for the S View cover, a self-capacitive touch screen layer for Air View and thermometer and hygrometer sensors, the last two of which only the Galaxy S4 and Galaxy Note 3 out of all historical Samsung flagship devices are equipped with.

==== International variants ====
Galaxy S4 models use one of two processors, depending on the region and network compatibility. The S4 version for North America, most of Europe, parts of Asia, and other countries contains Qualcomm's Snapdragon 600 system-on-chip, featuring a quad-core 1.9 GHz Krait 300 CPU and an Adreno 320 GPU. The chip also contains a modem which supports LTE. Other models include Samsung's Exynos 5 Octa system-on-chip with a heterogeneous CPU. The octa-core CPU comprises a 1.6 GHz quad-core Cortex-A15 cluster and a 1.2 GHz quad-core Cortex-A7 cluster. The chip can dynamically switch between the two clusters of cores based on CPU usage; the chip switches to the A15 cores when more processing power is needed, and stays on the A7 cores to conserve energy on lighter loads. Only one of the clusters is used at any particular moment, and software sees the processor as a single quad-core CPU. The SoC also contains an IT tri-core PowerVR SGX 544 graphics processing unit (GPU). Regional models of the S4 vary in support for LTE; for Exynos 5-based models, while the E300K/L/S versions support LTE, with the Cortex-A15 also clocked at 1.6 GHz. the GT-I9500 model does not. The S4 GT-I9505 includes a multiband LTE transceiver.

==== LTE-A (LTE+) variant GT-I9506 ====
On June 24, 2013, a variant supporting LTE Advanced (model number GT-I9506 and SHV-E330), the first commercially available device to do so, was announced for South Korea. In December 2013, it was also shipped to Germany as Samsung Galaxy S4 LTE+, but only with Telekom and Vodafone branding. It also was equipped with increased processing power by using the same CPU (Snapdragon 800) and GPU (Adreno 330) hardware as the Galaxy Note 3 SM-N9005, although no precluded video recording capabilities beyond 1080p at 30 fps.

==== Storage options ====
The S4 comes with either 16 GB, 32 GB, 64 GB of internal storage, which can be supplemented with up to an additional 64 GB with a microSD card slot. Unofficially, the S4 microSD card slot supports 128 GB cards as well. The S4 contains a 2600 mAh, NFC-enabled battery.

=== Software ===
The S4 used to have Android 4.2.2 and Samsung's TouchWiz Nature user experience. Head tracking features have been extended on the S4; the new "Smart Scroll" feature can be used to scroll while looking at the screen by slightly tilting head or phone forward or backward, and "Smart Pause" allows the video player to pause videos if the user is not looking at the screen. "Air View" and "Air Gestures" implement gestures and other functionality (such as previewing images or messages) by holding or swiping a hand or finger slightly above the screen, similarly to Samsung's Galaxy Note series, and adds a feature known as "Quick Glance", which uses the proximity sensor to wake the phone so it can display notifications. The "Group Play" feature allows ad hoc sharing of files between Galaxy phones, along with multiplayer games and music streaming between S4 phones. The S4 also introduces Knox in the Android 4.3 update, a suite of features which implements a sandbox for enterprise environments that can co-exist with a user's "personal" data. Knox incorporates use of the ARM TrustZone extensions and security enhancements to the Android platform.

The camera app implements numerous new features (some of which were first seen on the Galaxy Camera), including an updated interface, and new modes such as "Drama" (which composes a moving element from multiple shots into a single photo), "Eraser" (which takes multiple shots and allows the user to remove unnecessary elements from a picture), "Dual Shot" (which uses the front-facing camera for a picture-in-picture effect), "Sound and Shot" (which allows the user to record a voice clip alongside a photo), "Animated Photo", and "Story Album" among others. The S4 also supports High Efficiency Video Coding (HEVC), a next-generation video codec. Other new pre-loaded apps include WatchOn (an electronic program guide that can utilize the S4's infrared transmitter to be a remote control), S Translator, the workout tracker S Health, S Voice Drive, S Memo, TripAdvisor, and an optical character recognition app. The previous "Hub" apps from past Samsung devices were replaced by a single Samsung Hub app, with access to music, e-books, and games that can be purchased by users. To take the screenshot the user can simply swipe their hand on the screen from one end to other horizontally.

In February 2014, Samsung began rolling out an update to Android 4.4.2 "KitKat" for the S4; the update adds user interface tweaks such as a camera shortcut on the corner of the lock screen, options for setting default launcher and text messaging applications, support for printing, and a new location settings menu for tracking and controlling the use of location tracking by apps. It also makes significant changes to the handling of secondary storage on the device for security reasons; applications' access to the SD card is restricted to designated, app-specific directories only, while full access to internal primary storage is still allowed. Although this behavior has existed since Android 3.0 "Honeycomb", OEMs such as Samsung previously modified their distributions of Android to retain the previous behavior, allowing applications to have unlimited access to SD card contents.

In January 2015, Samsung began rolling out an update to Android 5.0.1 "Lollipop" in Russia and India, an update which brings all the features of Lollipop, such as enhanced performance and lockscreen, including a refined interface with a flatter and geometric look, as seen on the Galaxy S5. Samsung paused the rollout soon after, when users reported major bugs. The rollout continued in March 2015 starting with unlocked models in the UK, Nordic and Baltic countries and has since then spread to several other countries. US (starting with AT&T and Sprint) and Canadian Galaxy S4 models received Android 5.0.1 Lollipop update in April 2015; despite this, there is a workaround available via ROMs taken from the Galaxy S6 series that can make upgrading the Galaxy S4 to Android 7.0 "Nougat" with Samsung Experience 8.0 possible.

=== Model variants ===
Several different model variants of the S4 are sold, with most variants varying mainly in handling regional network types and bands. To prevent grey market reselling, models of the S4 manufactured after July 2013 implement a regional lockout system in certain regions, requiring that the first SIM card used on a European and North American model be from a carrier in that region. Samsung stated that the lock would be removed once a local SIM card is used. SIM format for all variants is Micro-SIM, which can have one or two depending on model.

Model	GT-I9500	SHV-E300K/L/S	SHV-E330K/L/S	GT-I9505	GT-I9506	GT-I9505G	SGH-I337[M/Z]	SGH-M919[V]	SCH-I545	SPH-L720	SPH-L720T	SCH-R970	SCH-R970X	SCH-R970C	GT-I9508	SCH-I959D	GT-I9502	GT-I9507V	GT-I9508V	SGH-N045 (SC-04E)
Countries	International	South Korea		International		United States	US/Canada/Mexico	US/Canada	United States						China					Japan
Carriers	International	KT, LG U+, SK Telecom		International (LTE)			AT&T, Cricket Wireless (GSM), Telcel, Bell, Rogers, Telus, Koodo, Virgin	T-Mobile, MetroPCS, Videotron, Wind, EastLink, Mobilicity	Verizon	Sprint, Boost Mobile		U.S. Cellular	C Spire Wireless	Cricket Wireless (CDMA)	China Mobile	China Telecom	China Unicom	China Unicom (TD-LTE)	China Mobile (TD-LTE)	NTT docomo
2G	850, 900, 1800, 1900 MHz; GSM / GPRS / EDGE	E300L: CDMA 1xRTT All models: 900, 1800, 1900 MHz; GSM / GPRS / EDGE		850, 900, 1800, 1900 MHz; GSM / GPRS / EDGE					CDMA; 850, 900, 1800, 1900 MHz; GSM / GPRS / EDGE			CDMA			900, 1800, 1900 MHz; GSM / GPRS / EDGE	CDMA 900, 1800, 1900 MHz; GSM / GPRS / EDGE	850, 900, 1800, 1900 MHz; GSM / GPRS / EDGE			
3G	850, 900, 1900, 2100 MHz; UMTS / HSPA+	E300L: EV-DO Rev. B 1900, 2100 MHz; UMTS / HSPA+		850, 900, 1900, 2100 MHz; UMTS / HSPA+		850, 1700, 1900, 2100 MHz; UMTS / HSPA+	850, 1900, 2100 MHz; UMTS / HSPA+	850, 1700, 1900, 2100 MHz; UMTS / HSPA+	800, 1900 MHz; EVDO Rev. A 850, 900, 1900, 2100 MHz; UMTS / HSPA+			800, 1700, 1900 MHz; EVDO Rev. A			1880, 2010 MHz; TD-SCDMA; 900, 2100 MHz; UMTS / HSPA+	800, 1900 MHz; EVDO Rev. A	850, 900, 1900, 2100 MHz; UMTS / HSPA+		1880, 2010 MHz; TD-SCDMA 850, 900, 1900, 2100 MHz; UMTS / HSPA+	800, 2100 MHz; UMTS / HSPA+
4G LTE	No	K: 3(1800 MHz), 8(900 MHz); L: 1(2100 MHz), 5(850 MHz); S: 3(1800 MHz), 5(850 MHz)		800, 850, 900, 1800, 2100, 2600 MHz		1(2100 MHz), 2(1900 MHz), 4(AWS), 5(850 MHz), 7(2600 MHz), 17(700 MHz)			4(AWS), 13(700 MHz)	25(1900 MHz)	25(1900 MHz), 26(800 MHz), 41(2500 MHz)	2(1900 MHz), 4(AWS), 5(850 MHz), 12(700 MHz)	2(1900 MHz), 4(AWS), 25(1900 MHz)		No			41(2500 MHz)	38(2600 MHz), 39(1900 MHz), 40(2300 MHz)	1(2100 MHz), 19(800 MHz, 21(1500 MHz)
Max network speed	DC-HSPA+: 42 Mbit/s	LTE: 100 Mbit/s	LTE-A: 150 Mbit/s	LTE: 100 Mbit/s	LTE-A: 150 Mbit/s	LTE: 100 Mbit/s									DC-HSPA+: 42 Mbit/s	EVDO Rev. A: 3.1 Mbit/s	DC-HSPA+: 42 Mbit/s	LTE: 100 Mbit/s		
Broadcast receiver	No	T-DMB		No																1seg ISDB-Tmm
Dimensions	136.6 mm × 69.8 mm × 7.9 mm (5.38 in × 2.75 in × 0.31 in)																			
Weight	130 g (4.6 oz)	133 g (4.7 oz)	131 g (4.6 oz)	130 g (4.6 oz)												132 g (4.7 oz)		134 g (4.7 oz)	130 g (4.6 oz)	
Operating system	Android 4.2.2 with TouchWiz Nature UX 2.0 (OTA upgrade to 5.0.1 available)					Stock Android 4.2.2 (OTA upgrade to 5.0.1 available)	Android 4.2.2 with TouchWiz Nature UX 2.0 (OTA upgrade to 5.0.1 available)													
Wi-Fi	Broadcom BCM4335 a/b/g/n/ac + Bluetooth																			
GPS	Broadcom BCM47521		?	Qualcomm																
NFC	Broadcom BCM2079x		?	Broadcom BCM2079x																
SoC	Samsung Exynos 5 Octa Exynos 5410		Qualcomm Snapdragon 800 MSM8974	Qualcomm Snapdragon 600 APQ8064AB	Qualcomm Snapdragon 800 MSM8974	Qualcomm Snapdragon 600 APQ8064AB										Samsung Exynos 5 Octa Exynos 5410		Qualcomm Snapdragon 600 APQ8064AB		
CPU	1.6 GHz quad-core ARM Cortex-A15 & 1.2 GHz quad-core ARM Cortex-A7		2.3 GHz quad-core Qualcomm Krait 400	1.9 GHz quad-core Qualcomm Krait 300	2.3 GHz quad-core Qualcomm Krait 400	1.9 GHz quad-core Qualcomm Krait 300										1.6 GHz quad-core ARM Cortex-A15 & 1.2 GHz quad-core ARM Cortex-A7		1.9 GHz quad-core Qualcomm Krait 300		
GPU	IT SGX544MP3		Qualcomm Adreno 330	Qualcomm Adreno 320	Qualcomm Adreno 330	Qualcomm Adreno 320										IT SGX544MP3		Qualcomm Adreno 320		
RAM	2 GB																			
Internal storage	16/32 GB	32 GB		16/32 GB		16 GB	16/32 GB	16 GB	16/32 GB	16 GB							16/32 GB	32 GB	16/32 GB	16 GB
SAR US	Head: 0.85 W/kg; Body: 1.55 W/kg			Head: 0.77 W/kg; Body: 1.17 W/kg	Head: 0.926 W/kg; Body: 1.389 W/kg	Head: 0.84 W/kg; Body: 1.18 W/kg		Head: 1.03 W/kg; Body: 1.31 W/kg	Head: 0.75 W/kg; Body: 1.43 W/kg	Head: 0.98 W/kg; Body: 1.58 W/kg		Head: 0.96 W/kg; Body: 1.23 W/kg	Head: 0.88 W/kg; Body: 1.43 W/kg							

==== Google Play Edition ====
At the Google I/O 2013 keynote, Samsung and Google revealed that an edition of the U.S. S4 would be released on June 26, 2013, through Google Play, with the HTC One M7, Sony Xperia Z Ultra, Motorola Moto G, and HTC One M8 releasing later on. initially featuring stock Android 4.2.2, the phone later updated to 5.0.1, with Samsung provided updates; it has an unlockable bootloader (similar to Nexus devices) and supports LTE on AT&T and T-Mobile's networks. The model number is GT-I9505G.

=== Accessories ===
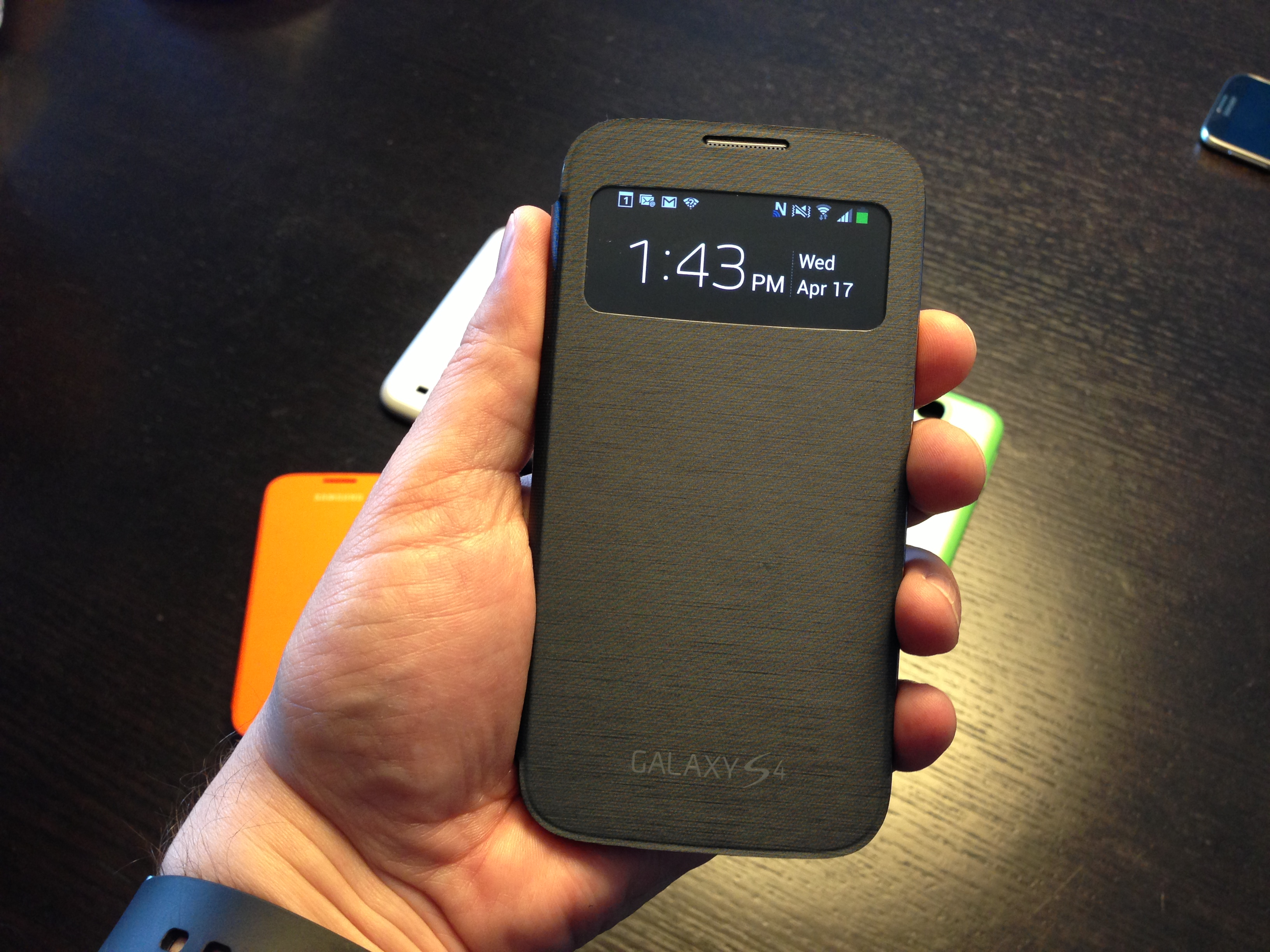
The "S View Cover" accessory contains a window that can be used to display notifications and a clock.

At retail, the S4 is bundled with a USB cable, AC adapter, and in-ear headphones. The "S View Cover" accessory "closes" the phone. When this cover is detected (by a Hall-effect sensor), the time and battery are displayed in this cover's window area.

== Reception ==
=== Critical reception ===
While some users considered all new Galaxy S4 features innovative and legitimately useful, others called them feature creep or just gimmicks. Those features are, for example, Smart Pause, Smart Rotation, Smart Scroll, Air View, Air Gesture, Story Album and Temperature and humidity sensors. These features and sensors are available and optionally utilizable for users and software that needs them. Additionally, the Galaxy S4 is equipped with an "easy mode" that hides many features and increases the size of on-screen elements for easier readability for novice mobile phone users.

The S4 received many positive reviews, though it also received some criticism.

Gareth Beavis of TechRadar wrote that the phone is a "stunning smartphone that won't let you down". It received praise for its "stunning screen", "superfast processor", and "Great camera", but was criticized for user interface issues.

ReadWrite's Rowinski described the phone as a "solid" and "first-rate smartphone", but criticised Samsung's use of "bloatware, pre-loaded apps and features that you will likely never use".

TIME's McCraken said the S4 is a smartphone with everything; it has the biggest screen and the most built-in features. He wishes the S4 would mark the end of Samsung's plan to add too many new features with its flagship smartphones.

Technology journalist Walt Mossberg described the S4 as "a good phone, just not a great one". Mossberg wrote: "while I admire some of its features, overall, it isn't a game-changer." He criticized the software as "especially weak" and "often gimmicky, duplicative of standard Android apps, or, in some cases, only intermittently functional." He urged readers to "consider the more polished-looking, and quite capable, HTC One, rather than defaulting to the latest Samsung."

Consumer Reports named the S4 as the top smartphone as of May 2013 due to its screen quality, multitasking support, and built-in IR blaster.

Critics noted that about half of the internal storage on the S4's 16 GB model was taken up by its system software, using 1 GB more than the S III and leaving only 8.5 to 9.15 GB for the storage of other data, including downloaded apps (some of which cannot be moved to the SD card). Samsung initially stated that the space was required for the S4's new features, but following a report regarding the issue on the BBC series Watchdog, Samsung stated that it would review the possibility of optimising the S4's operating system to use less local drive space in a future update. Storage optimizations were brought in an update first released in June 2013, which frees 80 MB of internal storage and restores the ability to move apps to the device's microSD card.

=== Commercial reception ===
The S4 reached 10 million pre-orders from retailers in the first two weeks after its announcement. In the United States, this prompted Samsung to announce that due to larger than expected demand, the roll out of devices on U.S. carriers Sprint and T-Mobile would be slower than expected.

The S4 sold 4 million in 4 days and 10 million in 27 days making it the then fastest selling smartphone in Samsung's history (this has been eclipsed by the Galaxy S5). The Galaxy S III sold 4 million units in 21 days, the Galaxy S II took 55 days and the Galaxy S took 85 days.

Samsung shipped more than 20 million S4 smartphones by June 30, which is around 1.7 times faster than the Galaxy S III. As of October 23, 2013, Samsung has sold over 40 million S4 units six months after release.

=== Battery problems and safety issues ===
A house in Hong Kong is alleged to have been set on fire by an S4 in July 2013, followed by a minor burnt S4 in Pakistan. A minor fire was also reported in Newbury, United Kingdom in October 2013. Some users of the phone have also reported swelling batteries and overheating; Samsung has offered affected customers new batteries free of charge.

On December 2, 2013, Canadian Richard Wygand uploaded a YouTube video describing his phone combusting. The phone was plugged into AC power overnight; he woke up to the smell of smoke and burning matter. In the video, the power cord was shown to be severely burnt and showed warped damage to the power plug. Later in the video, Wygand describes how he attempted to get a replacement:

We have a service provider; it's Rogers here in Canada. Rogers [has] seen it, and they freaked out. They even said, 'You could send it in through us — it'll take three weeks — or just go see Samsung.' The Samsung reps just said that they need video proof, and now we have to call it in. So we're gonna upload this, send it to Samsung. We'll let you know how it goes.

In his second video, uploaded a few days after the first one, Wygand states that in order to receive a replacement phone, Samsung allegedly asked him to sign a legal document requiring him to remove the video, remain silent about the agreement, and surrender any future claims against the company. He didn't sign the document, but his frustrations had been expressed in his video. In an interview with Mashable, Wygand said that since he posted the second video, Samsung refused to replace his phone for not signing the document and no further response from Samsung was received afterwards. However, an official spokesman from Samsung told Mashable, "Samsung takes the safety and security of our customers very seriously. Our Samsung Canada team is in touch with the customer, and is investigating the issue."

In the UK, companies which sold the S4 have varied in their reactions to claims by worried customers for replacement batteries under the Sale of Goods Act. Amazon, for example, have simply refunded part of the purchase price to allow for the cost of a replacement battery. O2 however insist that the complete phone, with the faulty battery, be returned to them so that they in turn can send it to Samsung to consider the claim.

== See also ==
- Samsung Electronics
- Samsung Galaxy
- Comparison of Samsung Galaxy S smartphones
- Samsung Galaxy S4 Active
- Samsung Galaxy S4 Mini
- Samsung Galaxy S4 Zoom

Preceded by Samsung Galaxy S III	Samsung Galaxy S4; 2013	Succeeded by Samsung Galaxy S5
