= Samsung HomeSync =

2013 TV box/home server by Samsung Mobile

- Manufacturer: Samsung Mobile
- Type: TV box/Home server combo
- First released: October 6, 2013
- Related: Samsung Smart TV
- Compatible networks: WiFi 802.11 2.4 and 5GHz; Bluetooth 4 NFC
- Operating system: Android 4.2.2 "Jelly Bean"
- CPU: Unknown Exynox 1.7GHz dual-core
- Memory: 1 GB DDR3
- Storage: 1 TB hard drive for media 8 GB eMMC for Android
- Battery: 3550 mAh
- Connectivity: Ethernet; Digital audio out, 2x USB-A 3.0; HDMI port microUSB 2.0; Power
- Data inputs: Compatible smartphone, power and settings button (located on the right edge)
- Model: GT‑B9150
- Development status: released

The HomeSync is an Android TV box and home server combo developed by Samsung Mobile. The unit is a full Android Jelly Bean device with a hard drive. While all other connected television units made by Samsung ran Orsay-based Samsung Smart TVs, due to the fact the HomeSync is made by Samsung's mobile division, it ran a skin of Android Jelly Bean. The HomeSync at launch was compatible with the Samsung Galaxy S4 Samsung Galaxy Note 3, Samsung Galaxy S III, Samsung Galaxy Note II, Samsung Galaxy Note 8.0, Samsung Galaxy Note 10.1 2014 Edition and Samsung Galaxy Camera. Others may have been supported if they had a protocol called "Samsung Link". The specs are noted to resemble the Ouya video game console minus the hard drive. It was announced in February 2013 at Mobile World Congress. It has been compared to the Apple TV series by Apple, which also integrated with iOS devices, but did not have network storage and cost less. The console features a 50 USD credit for Media Hub when you buy a HomeSync. On December 17, Samsung made most Android devices support the unit by adding it to the Play Store, also widening support of Samsung phones. Shortly before it launched, the store page and manual were available but unable to be bought.

== Remote ==
When syncing a phone to the HomeSync via the HomeSync app, there are 5 ways to control the unit: 4 navigation Buttons, Trackpad similar to the Apple TV's future Siri Remote, a QWERTY keyboard, and screen-mirroring to the phone, with control like the HomeSync is the phone's UI.

== Design ==
The unit is packaged in a glossy black box. The unit is about the size of three DVD cases stacked on top of one another. When placed on a flat kitchen countertop, it stands at a slight angle upward and the Samsung logo appears on the left side.

== Software ==
You can mirror a compatible mobile display to the unit and also access cloud storage files on the unit. Apps preloaded onto the unit include Google Play, Google Play Music, a photo gallery application, YouTube, a web browser application, and Samsung-branded applications such as Media Hub and Music Hub. The unit runs an unknown version of Android Jelly Bean. The skin supports eight separate accounts and allows all users to upload and download data from multiple devices and share the data with others. There are options for file encryption and user-specific username and password for privacy. Some apps including Google Analytics cannot be installed via the play store and require sideloading.
