= Samsung Galaxy Note 3 Neo =

2014 Android smartphone by Samsung Electronics

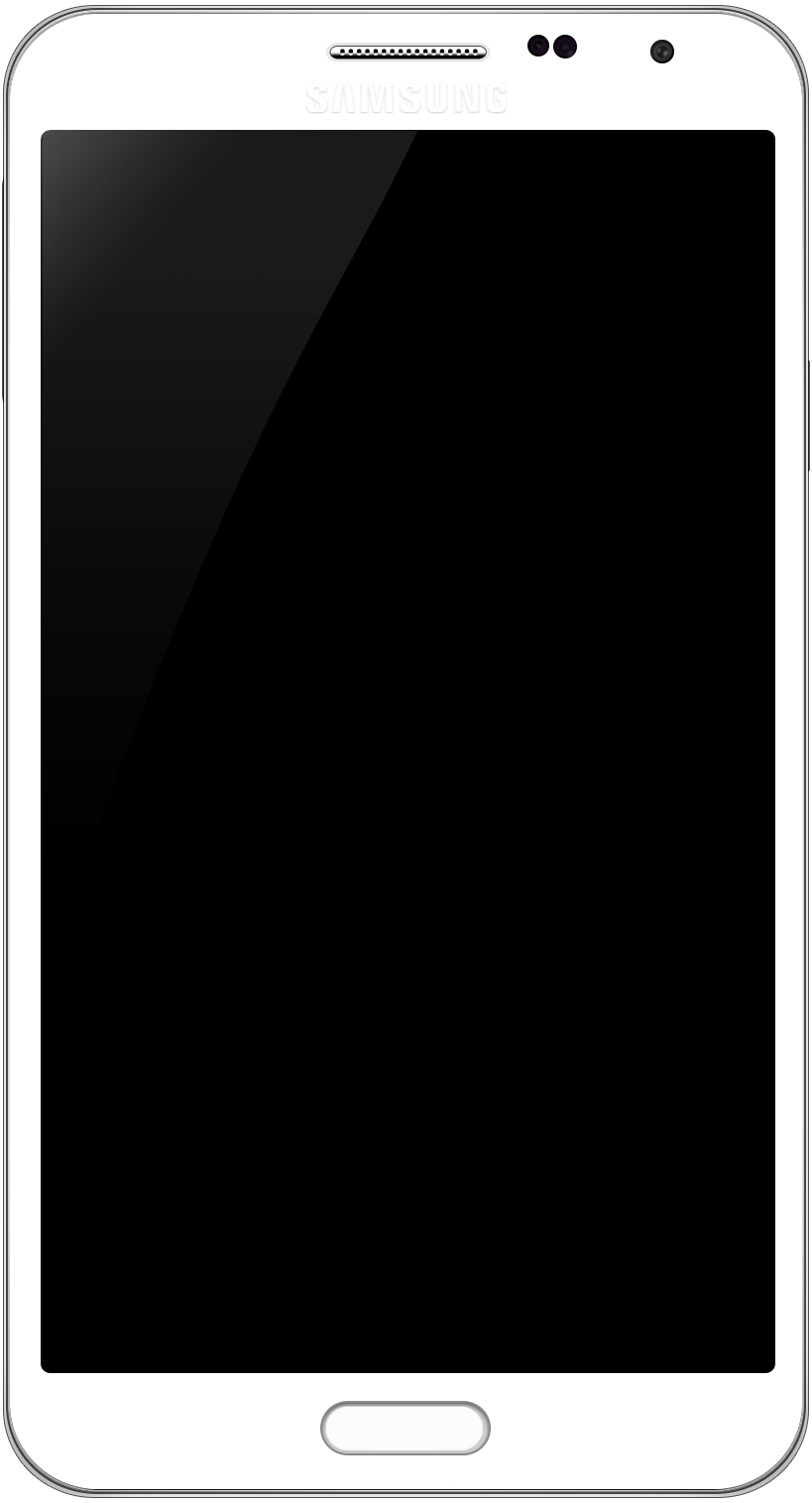
- Samsung Galaxy Note 3 Neo in White
- Also known as: Samsung Galaxy Note 3 Lite
- Brand: Samsung
- Manufacturer: Samsung Electronics
- Type: Phablet
- Series: Galaxy Note
- Family: Samsung Galaxy
- First released: February 1, 2014; 12 years ago
- Successor: Samsung Galaxy Note 10 Lite
- Related: Samsung Galaxy S4; Samsung Galaxy S4 Active; Samsung Galaxy S4 Mini; Samsung Galaxy S4 Zoom; Samsung Galaxy Note 3 Samsung Galaxy Gear; Samsung Galaxy Round
- Form factor: Slate
- Dimensions: 148.4 mm (5.84 in) H 77.4 mm (3.05 in) W 8.6 mm (0.34 in) D
- Weight: 162.5 g (5.73 oz)
- Operating system: Original: Android 4.3 "Jelly Bean"; Current: Android 5.1.1 "Lollipop"; Unofficial: Android 8.1 "Oreo" Via LineageOS 15.1
- System-on-chip: Samsung Exynos 5 Hexa 5260 (LTE and 3G version); Qualcomm Snapdragon 400 (Dual Sim version); Qualcomm Snapdragon 800 (South Korea version)
- CPU: Hexa-core 1.7 GHz Cortex-A15 and 1.3 GHz Cortex-A7 (LTE and 3G version); 1.6 GHz quad-core Snapdragon 400 (Dual Sim version); Qualcomm Krait 400 MP4 2.3 GHz (South Korea version)
- GPU: ARM Mali T624MP6 GPU (LTE version); Adreno 305 (Dual Sim version); Adreno 330 450Mhz (South Korea version)
- Memory: 2 GB LPDDR3
- Storage: 16/32 GB flash memory
- Removable storage: microSDXC up to 64 GB
- Battery: 3,100 mAh; User replaceable
- Rear camera: 8-megapixel, camera with autofocus, BSI, 1080p
- Front camera: 2-megapixel
- Display: 5.5 in (140 mm); HD Super AMOLED 267 ppi (1280×720) (PenTile matrix) (16:9 aspect ratio) with Gorilla Glass 3
- Connectivity: List: Wi-Fi :802.11 a/b/g/n(2.4/5 GHz); Wi-Fi Direct; Wi-Fi hotspot; DLNA; Miracast; GPS/GLONASS; NFC; Bluetooth 4.0; Infrared; USB 2.0 micro-B port; USB OTG 1.3; MHL 2.0; HDMI (TV-out, via MHL A\V link); 3.5 mm (1/8 in) TRRS headset jack
- Data inputs: List: Multi-touch touch screen; 3 push buttons; Headset controls; Proximity sensor; Ambient light sensors; 3-axis gyroscope; Magnetometer; Accelerometer; Barometer; Hall-effect sensor; hygrometer; gesture sensor; thermometer; aGPS; GLONASS; RGB light sensor; S Pen (Stylus)/Pen
- Development status: Discontinued
- SAR: EU 0.25 W/kg (head) 0.27 W/kg (body); USA 0.54 W/kg (head) 0.7 W/kg (body)
- Other: Accelerometer, gyroscope, Hall-effect sensor, magnetometer, proximity sensor, RGB light sensor

The Samsung Galaxy Note 3 Neo (also known as the Samsung Galaxy Note 3 Lite) is an Android-based phablet smartphone produced and developed by Samsung Electronics. The Galaxy Note 3 Neo was unveiled by Samsung Poland on February 1, 2014, with its worldwide release later in that month. Serving as a lower priced version of the Samsung Galaxy Note 3, the Note 3 Neo was designed to have the same lighter, more upscale design than previous iterations of the Galaxy series (with a plastic leather backing and faux metallic bezel) first supported by its bigger sibling, and to expand upon the stylus and multi-tasking oriented functionality in its software, which includes the new navigation wheel for pen-enabled apps, along with pop-up apps and expanded multi-window functionality, while lacking more sophisticated functionality such as 1080p video recording and USB 2.0 port.

The Galaxy Note 3 Neo is the only smartphone in its series to be equipped with temperature and humidity sensors and touch screen able to detect a floating finger, all which first featured on the Galaxy S4 released earlier that year.

Samsung sold 5 million units of the Galaxy Note 3 Neo within its first month of sale and broke 10 million units sales in just 2 months.

== Specifications ==
=== Hardware ===
The Galaxy Note 3 Neo's design was intended to carry the same upscale, "premium" look with the new generation of Samsung devices. Although it carries a similarly polycarbonate-oriented design to other recent Samsung devices, the Galaxy Note 3 Neo has a faux metallic bezel and a rear cover made of plastic leather with faux stitching. With a thickness of 8.6 mm (0.34 in), it is slightly thinner than the Galaxy Note II, and is also slightly lighter. Two LTE versions of the Galaxy Note 3 Neo (including one Duos 3G model) uses a 1.6 GHz quad-core Snapdragon 400 chip, i.e., the SM-N7509V, SM-N7506V and SM-N7502 (Duos 3G). In Korea, the phone uses a 2.26 GHz quad-core Snapdragon 800 chip. The other versions, including the international 3G models and some 4G LTE models, use a hexa-core Exynos 5260, consisting of two 1.7 GHz Cortex-A15 cores and four 1.3 GHz Cortex-A7 cores, i.e., SM-N7507, SM-N7500Q, SM-N7505L, SM-N7505, SM-N750. The device also includes 2 GB of RAM, a 5.5-inch 720p Super AMOLED display, an 8-megapixel rear-facing camera capable of filming videos in 720p at 60 fps, 1080p at 30 fps and 4K resolution at 30 fps (for only 5 mins, Snapdragon 800 model only), 16 or 32 GB of internal storage, and a 3100 mAh battery.

As with other Galaxy Note series devices, the Galaxy Note 3 Neo ships with an S Pen stylus, which has been updated to use a more symmetrical shape. The Galaxy Note 3 Neo reverted to the conventional connection of USB 2.0, in order to save costs.

The Galaxy Note 3 Neo was made available in Black, White, and Green colors.

=== Software ===
The Galaxy Note 3 Neo comes with Android 4.3 "Jelly Bean" and Samsung's proprietary TouchWiz user interface and software. Additional pen-oriented features have been added to the Note 3 Neo's software; removing the stylus from its compartment (or pressing its button whilst hovering over the display) activates an "Air Command" pie menu which provides shortcuts to pen-oriented features such as Action Memos (on-screen sticky notes that use handwriting recognition to detect their contents and provide relevant actions, such as looking up addresses on Google Maps and dialing phone numbers), Screen Write (an annotation tool), Pen Window (which allows users to draw pop-up windows to run certain apps inside), the search tool S Finder, and Scrapbook. The multi-window functionality has also been carried over with expanded app support, the ability to run multiple instances of a single app, and the ability to drag and drop content between apps. The device also ships with a news aggregator app known as My Magazine, accessible by swiping up from the bottom of the screen, and an updated version of S Note.

=== Software Upgrades ===
All models of Galaxy Note 3 Neo received the Android 5.1.1 update in January 2016, except for variants with the Snapdragon 400, which have not received any major updates.

== Release ==
It was officially announced on February 1, 2014, with a release date starting from March 2014.

== See also ==
- Samsung Galaxy Note series

Preceded by Samsung Galaxy Note II	Samsung Galaxy Note 3 Neo; 2014	Succeeded by Samsung Galaxy Note 4
