= Samsung Galaxy J =

2013 Android smartphone by Samsung

Samsung Galaxy J (SC-02F, SGH-N075T)
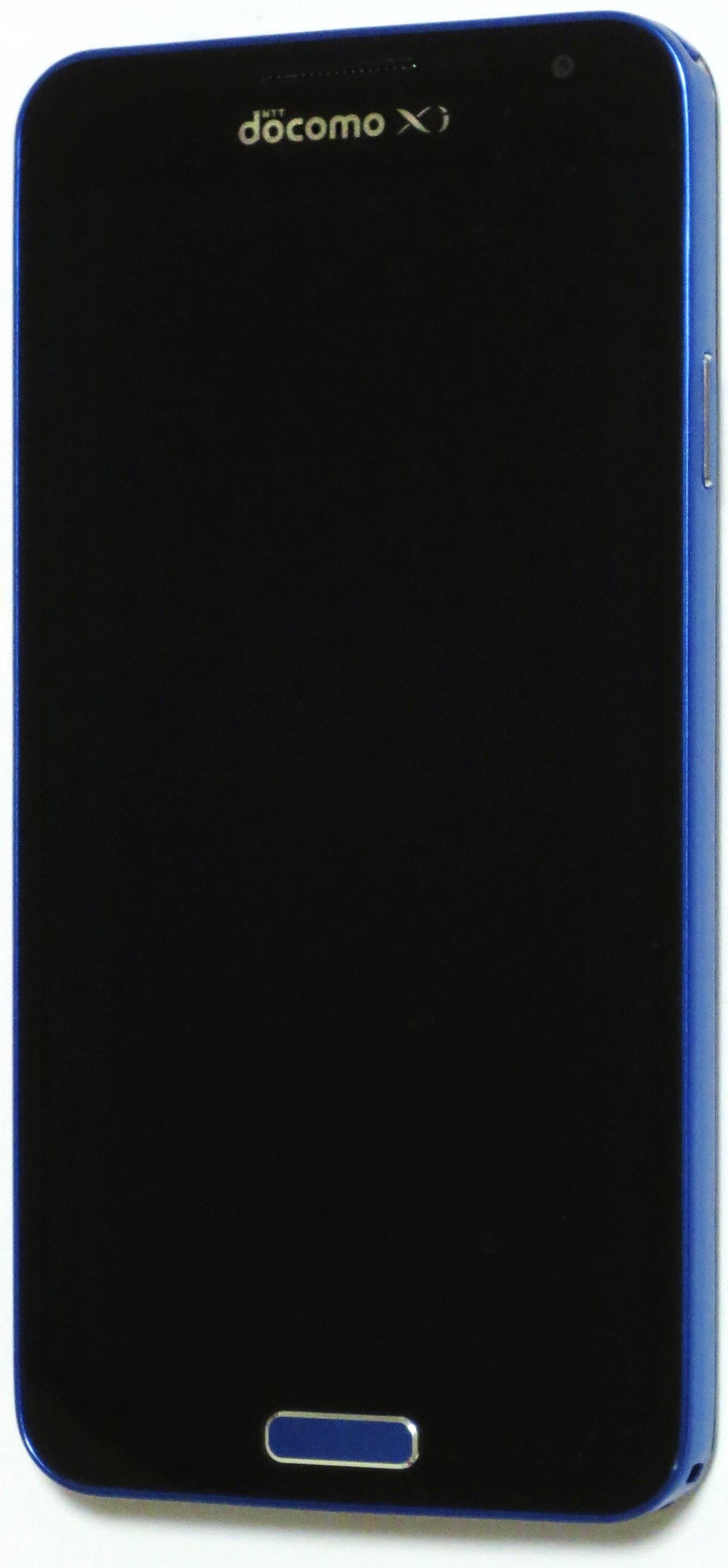
- Samsung Galaxy J in Lapis Blue
- Manufacturer: Samsung
- First released: December 2013
- Successor: Samsung Galaxy S5 Neo
- Related: Samsung Galaxy S4; Samsung Galaxy Note 3
- Compatible networks: GSM/GPRS/EDGE/ 850/900/1800/1900 MHz; UMTS/HSPA; 850/2100 MHz, roaming (2100/850MHz); LTE Cat4 800/1500/1800/2100 MHz
- Form factor: Slate
- Dimensions: 137 mm × 70 mm × 8.6 mm (5.39 in × 2.76 in × 0.34 in)
- Weight: 146 g (5 oz) (0.322 lb)
- Operating system: Original: Android 4.3 Jelly Bean; Current: Android 5.0 Lollipop
- System-on-chip: Qualcomm Snapdragon 800 Krait 400
- CPU: Quad-Core 2.36 GHz
- GPU: Adreno 330 @450 MHz
- Memory: 3 GB
- Storage: 32 GB (Japanese model SC-02F); 16 GB (Overseas including Taiwan, model SGH-N075T)
- Removable storage: MicroSD support for up to 64 GB
- Battery: 2600 mAh (Li-Ion).
- Rear camera: 13.2 Megapixels, with Power HCRI LED Flash (Japanese); 13 Megapixelas BSI CMOS (Overseas including Taiwan)
- Front camera: 2.1 Megapixels
- Display: Super AMOLED, 5 in (109 mm) diagonal. 1920 x 1080 px, 441 ppi
- Connectivity: microUSB 2.0, Bluetooth 4.0, Wi-Fi, GPS, GLONASS
- Data inputs: Touch Screen (capacitive), Compass (Magnetometer), Proximity, Accelerometer, Geomagnetic sensor, Gyro sensor, RGB light sensor, Barometer sensor, Proximity sensor, Gesture sensor, Thermometer and Hygrometer

The Samsung Galaxy J is a smartphone developed and manufactured by Samsung which works on the 32-bit Android platform. This phone was originally developed for Japanese cellular carrier NTT DoCoMo in fall 2013, and the overseas version initially released in Taiwan in December 2013. The device features a Qualcomm Snapdragon 800 Quad-Core 2.36 GHz processor with 3 GB of RAM and a full-HD Super AMOLED display.

== Specifications ==
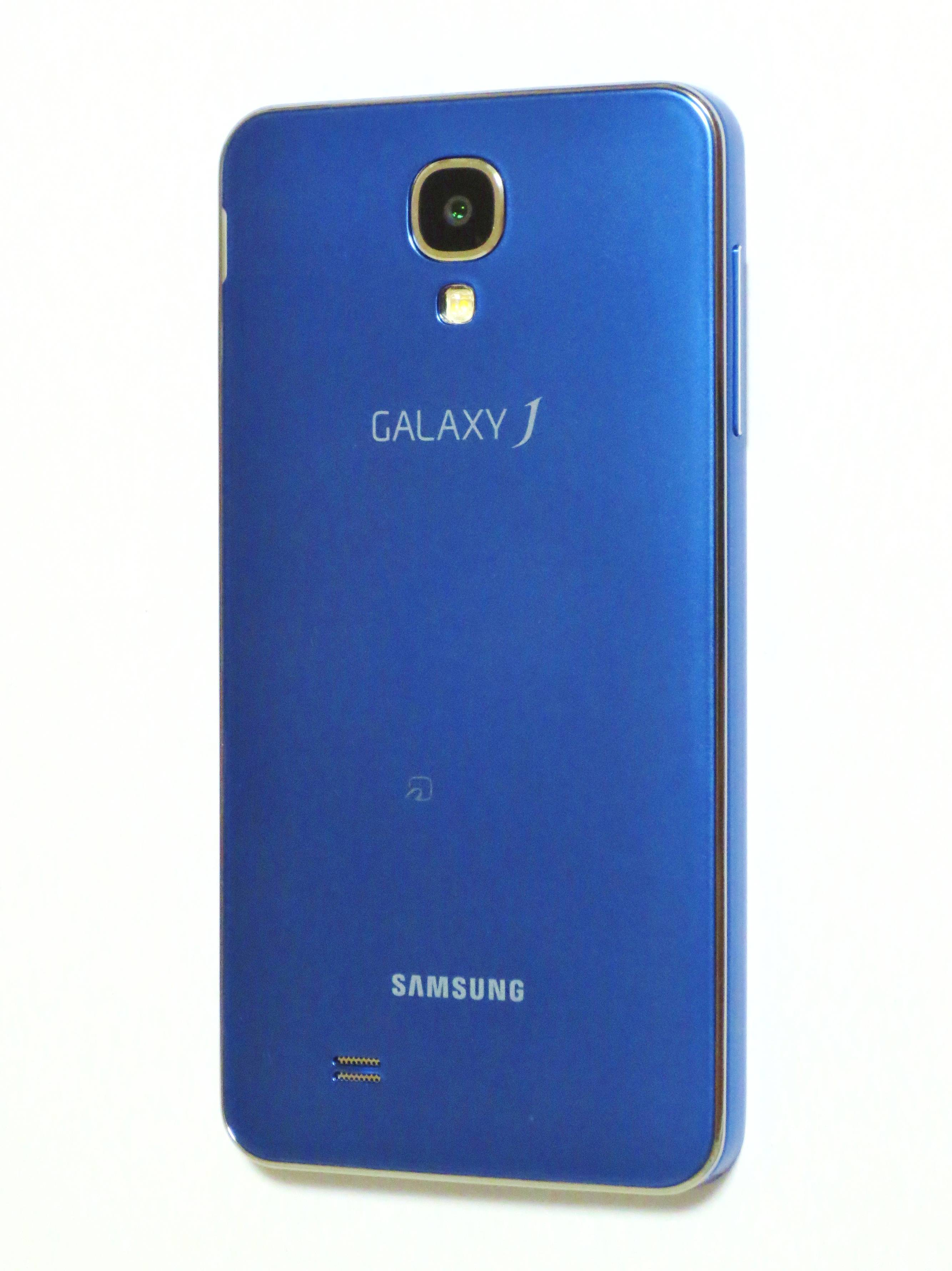
Back view of the Japanese model, SC-02F

=== Hardware ===
The phone is powered with Qualcomm's Snapdragon 800 chipset which includes 2.36 GHz processor, Adreno 330 GPU and 3 GB RAM, with 32 GB of internal storage and a 2600 mAh battery. The Galaxy J is fitted with a 5-inch Full HD Super AMOLED display and also includes a 13.2 MP rear camera with Power HCRI LED Flash and 2.1 MP front camera. The phone does not support USB 3.0 connectivity as compared to Galaxy Note 3.

=== Software ===
This phone was originally released with Android 4.3 Jelly Bean and can be updated to Android 5.0 Lollipop.

== See also ==
- List of Android devices
- Samsung Galaxy Note 3
- Nexus 5
