= Samsung Galaxy Note 8.0 =

Android tablet by Samsung

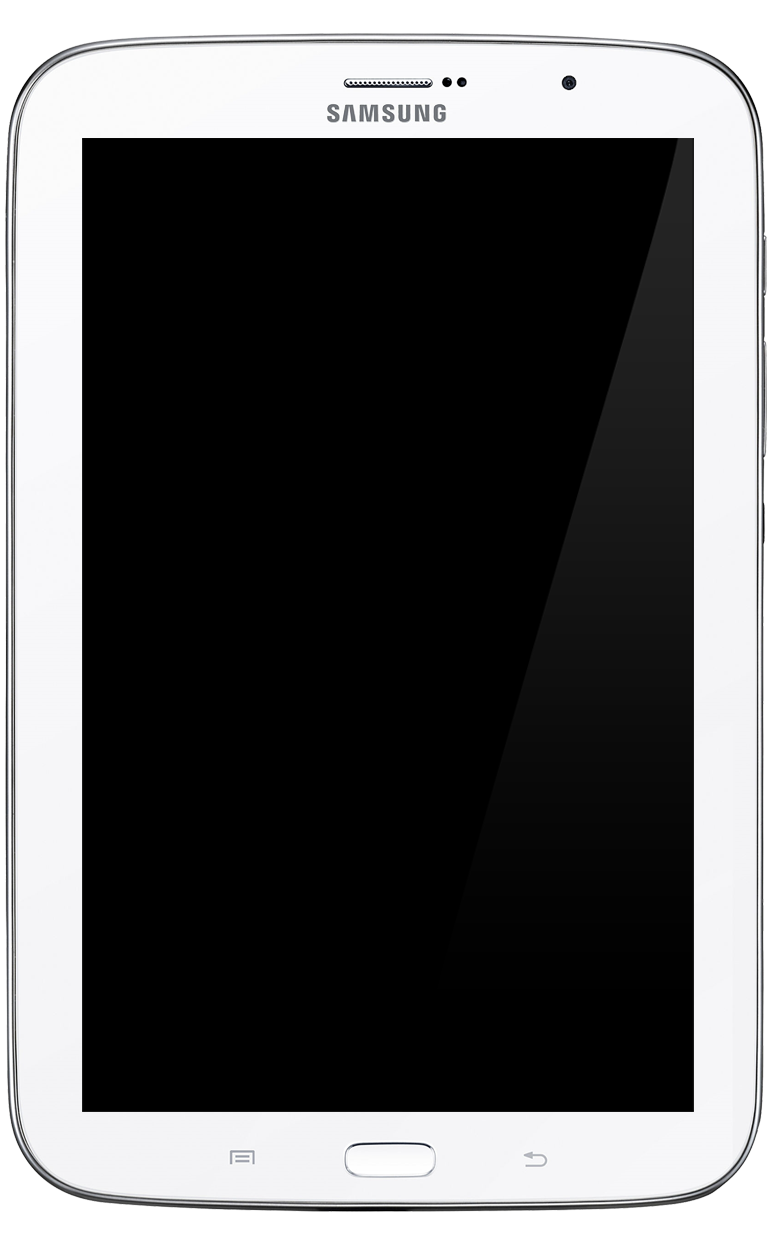
- Samsung Galaxy Note 8.0 in White
- Also known as: GT-N5100 (3G & Wifi); GT-N5110 (Wifi); GT-N5120 (3G, 4G/LTE & Wifi)
- Manufacturer: Samsung Electronics
- Product family: Galaxy Note
- Type: Tablet
- Released: 5 April 2013 (UK); 11 April 2013 (US); 13 April 2013 (PH)
- Discontinued: Late 2014 (phased)
- Operating system: Android 4.1.2 "Jelly Bean" (upgradable to 4.2.2 Jelly Bean, 4.4.2 "KitKat")
- System on a chip: Samsung Exynos 4412 quad-core processor
- CPU: 1.6 GHz quad-core
- Memory: 2 GB
- Storage: 16/32 GB flash memory, microSDXC slot (up to 64 GB)
- Display: 1280×800 px, 8.0 in (20 cm) diagonal, WXGA TFT display
- Graphics: ARM Mali-400 MP4
- Input: Multi-touch screen, digital compass, proximity and ambient light sensors, accelerometer and Wacom digitizer
- Camera: 5.0 MP AF rear-facing, 1.3 MP front-facing, both cameras with 720p-HD Video Recording
- Connectivity: Cat3 100 / 50 Mbit/s hexa-band 800, 850, 900, 1,800, 2,100, 2,600 MHz (4G, LTE model) HSPA+ 42, 5.76 Mbit/s 850, 900, 1,900, 2,100 MHz (4G, LTE model); HSPA+ 21, 5.76 Mbit/s quad 850, 900, 1,900, 2,100 MHz (3G, WiFi model); EDGE/GPRS quad 850, 900, 1,800, 1,900 MHz (3G, WiFi model) Wi-Fi 802.11a/b/g/n (2.4, 5 GHz), Bluetooth 3.0 (4.0 LE after Kit Kat update), HDMI (external cable)
- Power: 4,600 mAh Li-ion battery
- Dimensions: 8.3 in (210 mm) H 5.35 in (136 mm) W 0.31 in (7.9 mm) D
- Weight: WiFi: 340 g (0.75 lb); 3G: 345 g (0.761 lb); 4G/LTE: 347 g (0.765 lb)
- Successor: Samsung Galaxy Tab S 8.4
- Related: Samsung Galaxy Note II; Samsung Galaxy Note 10.1; Samsung Galaxy Tab 3 8.0
- Website: Microsite

The Samsung Galaxy Note 8.0 is an 8-inch Android-based tablet computer produced and marketed by Samsung Electronics. It belongs to the second generation of the Samsung Galaxy Note series tablets, which also includes a 10.1-inch model, the Galaxy Note 10.1. It was first sold in the US in April 2013. Like the larger model, it uses both touch and Samsung's S-Pen stylus. It is Samsung's first 8-inch tablet, and was followed later by a lower-end sibling, the Samsung Galaxy Tab 3 8.0.

== History ==
The Galaxy Note 8.0 was announced on 23 February 2013. It was shown along with the Galaxy S4 at the 2013 Mobile World Conference. Samsung confirmed that the Galaxy Note 8.0 would be released in the US on 11 April, with a price of $399.99 for the 16GB model.

== Features ==
The Galaxy Note 8.0 is released with Android 4.1.2 Jelly Bean. An upgrade to Android 4.2.2 Jelly Bean is available in some areas as an over-the-air update and through Samsung Kies. In February 2014, Samsung included the Galaxy Note 8.0 on their upgrade list for Android 4.4.2 KitKat. Roll out of the Android 4.4.2 update began May 12, 2014. On June 4, 2014, Samsung announced the 4.4.2 update for U.S. tablets. The Android 4.4.2 update included updated TouchWiz applications, but, with the notable and inexplicable elimination of its crucial handwriting preferences, largely retained the tablet's original feature set. Bluetooth low energy capability was enabled with the Android 4.4.2 firmware update.

Samsung has customized the interface with its TouchWiz UX software. As well as apps from Google, including Google Play, Gmail and YouTube, it has access to Samsung apps such as ChatON, S Note, S Suggest, S Voice, S Translator, S Planner, Smart Remote (Peel), Smart Stay, Multi-Window, Air View, Group Play, and All Share Play. The Camera user interface is known from the Galaxy S3.

Like the Galaxy S4, the Galaxy Note 8.0 is equipped with an infrared transmitter for usage as a universal remote control.

The Galaxy Note 8.0 is available in WiFi-only, 3G & Wi-Fi, and 4G/LTE & WiFi variants. Storage ranges from 16 GB to 32 GB depending on the model, with a microSDXC card slot for expansion. It has an 8-inch WXGA TFT screen with a resolution of 1280x800 pixels. It also features a 1.3 MP front camera and 5.0 MP AF rear-facing camera without flash. Its 5 megapixel rear camera also has the ability to record HD (720p) videos.

== See also ==
- Samsung Galaxy Note series
- Samsung Electronics
- Samsung Galaxy Note 10.1
- Samsung Galaxy Tab 3
- Samsung Galaxy Tab 3 8.0
