= Samsung Galaxy Note 10.1 =

Android tablet by Samsung

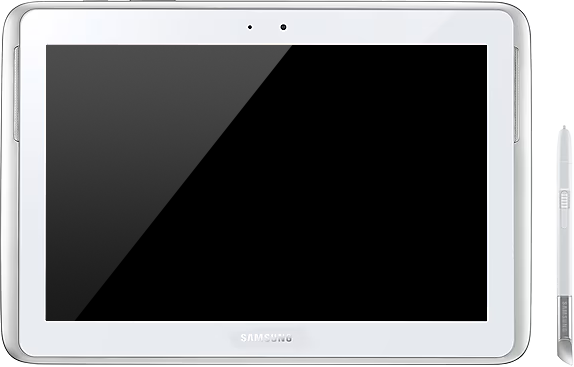
- Samsung Galaxy Note 10.1
- Also known as: GT-N8000 (3G & Wifi); GT-N8005 (GT-N8000 TR-Model, no voice-calls); GT-N8010, GT-N8013 (Wi-Fi); GT-N8020 (LTE, 3G & Wi-Fi)
- Manufacturer: Samsung Electronics
- Product family: Galaxy Note
- Type: Tablet
- Released: 27 August 2012; 14 years ago
- Operating system: Android 4.0.3 "Ice Cream Sandwich" with TouchWiz UI, upgradeable to Android 4.4.2 "KitKat". Unofficial LineageOS based on Android 6.x "Marshmallow", 7x Nougat, 9 Pie", 10, 11, Android 12, 13 and 14 are available.
- System on a chip: Samsung Exynos 4412
- CPU: 1.4 GHz quad-core ARM Cortex-A9 processor
- Memory: 2 GB RAM (LPDDR3)
- Storage: 16, 32 and 64 GB
- Removable storage: Up to 64 GB microSD card
- Display: 10.1 in (260 mm) LCD with WXGA (1280×800, 149 pixels per inch) resolution 16:10 aspect ratio
- Graphics: ARM Mali-400 MP4
- Sound: Surround speakers
- Input: Capacitive touchscreen and Wacom digitizer, supporting 1,024 levels of sensitivity
- Camera: Rear: 5 Mpx Recording Video Full HD Video (720p, 480p, 320p) at 30 fps and 144p at 15 fps, x4 Digital zoom, auto-focus with LED Flash; Front: 1.9 Mpx Recording Video (720p, 480p, 320p) at 30 fps and 144p at 15 fps
- Connectivity: 3.5 mm TRRS; Wi-Fi (802.11a/b/g/n 2.4 & 5 GHz) with Channel bonding; Wi-Fi Direct; Bluetooth 4.0; Optional 3G; USB Host (OTG) 2.0 and HDMI via separate dongle
- Power: 7,000 mAh
- Online services: Google Play; Samsung Apps
- Dimensions: H 257.8 mm W 175.3 mm D 8.9 mm
- Weight: 3G model: 600 g Wi-Fi model: 597 g
- Successor: Samsung Galaxy Note 10.1 2014 Edition
- Related: Samsung Galaxy Note II; Samsung Galaxy Tab 2 10.1; Samsung Galaxy Note 8.0
- Website: galaxynote10.1

The Samsung Galaxy Note 10.1 is a 10.1-inch tablet computer designed, developed and marketed by Samsung Electronics. The tablet runs Android 4.0.3 (Android 4.1.2 in Europe) and serves as a platform for multimedia consumption including movies, music, and web browsing. It is the second entry in the Samsung Galaxy Note range, which emphasises the use of a stylus, officially named S Pen (S standing for Samsung), as an input device for tasks such as sketching and note-taking.

== Details ==
The Note 10.1 was originally unveiled on 27 February 2012 at the Mobile World Congress (MWC) in Barcelona, Spain, with a 1.4 GHz dual-core processor. The tablet was released in Germany, Saudi Arabia and the UAE on 6 August 2012. This final version of the tablet incorporates a 1.4 GHz quad-core Exynos 4412 processor, same as in the Galaxy S III and Note II. The tablet comes with 16, 32 and 64 GB of internal storage, and 2 GB of LPDDR3 RAM. The Note 10.1 was launched in the United States, the United Kingdom, and South Korea on 16 August.

In 2014, Samsung began a rollout of Android 4.4.2 KitKat upgrade in Europe, both as an over-the-air (OTA) update and through Samsung Kies. Samsung customized the interface with its updated TouchWiz UX software.

== Reception ==
The Note 10.1 was well received by numerous technology outlets. Dave Oliver of Wired UK technology magazine gave a rating of 9 out of 10. The Note 10.1 was praised for its versatility, fast processor, writing interface, expandable memory and quality camera and described as a worthy challenger to the iPad. TechCrunch stated that the tablet was "awesome, great, and brilliant," with a bunch of S Pen optimized apps as a great feature.

== See also ==
- Samsung Galaxy Note series
- Samsung Electronics
- Samsung Galaxy Note II
- Samsung Galaxy Note 8.0

Preceded by -	Samsung Galaxy Note 10.1; 2012	Succeeded by Samsung Galaxy Note 10.1 2014 Edition
