= Samsung Galaxy Note =

Series of Android smartphones

Samsung Galaxy Note series
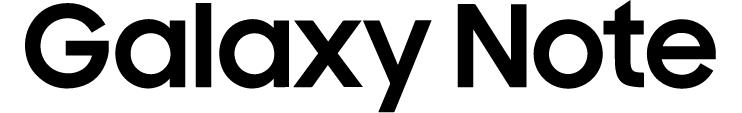
- Galaxy Note logo from 2015 to 2020, without the Samsung logo

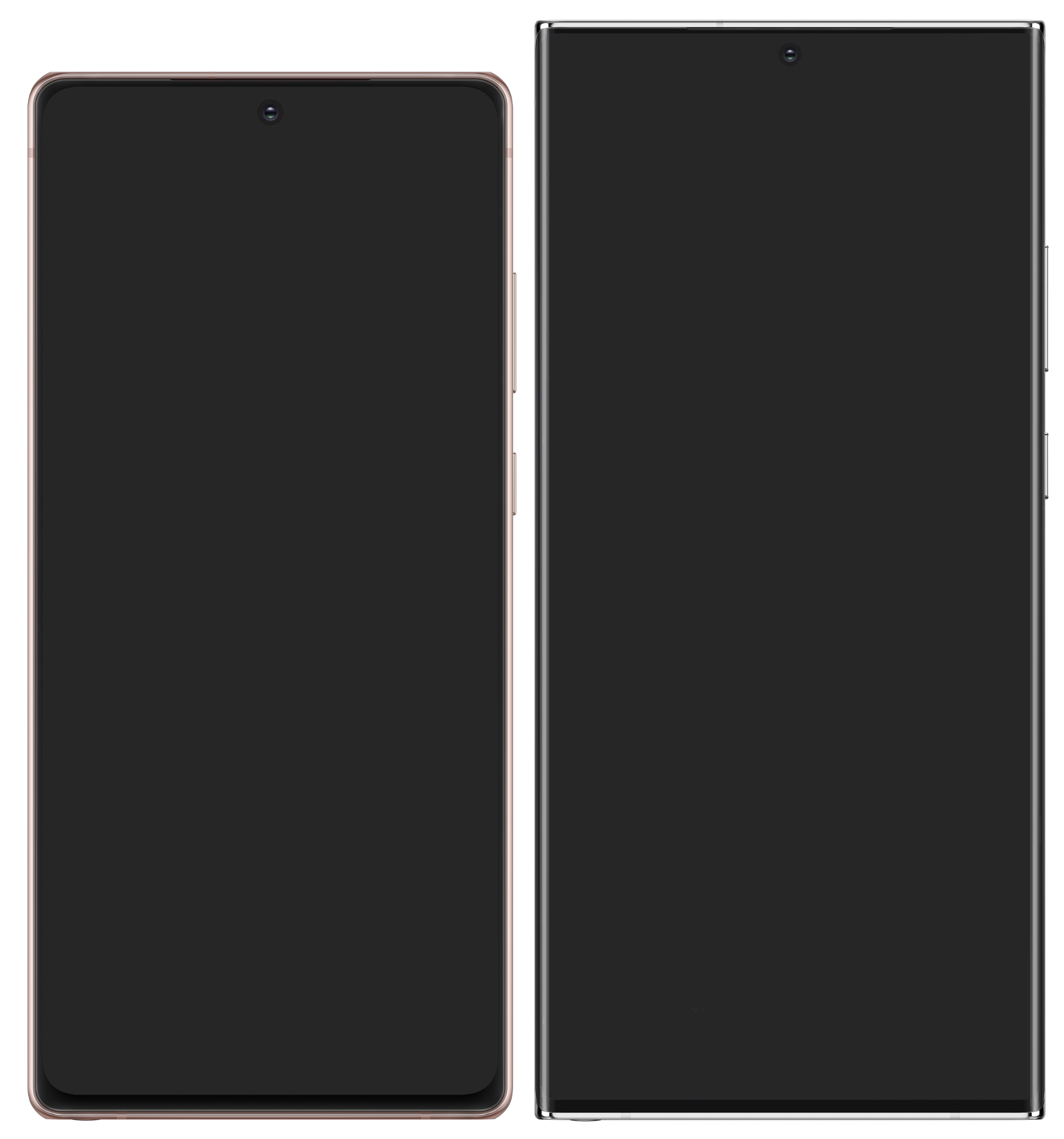
- Galaxy Note 20 (left) and Note 20 Ultra (right), the series' last models
- Manufacturer: Samsung Electronics
- Product family: Samsung Galaxy
- Type: Smartphones; Tablet computers
- Released: 29 October 2011; 15 years ago
- Discontinued: December 2021; 4 years ago
- Operating system: Android
- System on a chip: Samsung Exynos (2011–2020); Qualcomm Snapdragon (2011–2014, 2016–2020)
- Input: Touchscreen; Stylus
- Predecessor: Samsung Omnia Series
- Successor: Samsung Galaxy S series (succeeded by "Ultra" editions since Galaxy S22) (phablets); Samsung Galaxy Tab S series (succeeded by Galaxy Tab S3) (tablet computers)
- Related: Samsung Galaxy S series Samsung Galaxy Tab; Samsung Galaxy Tab S series Samsung Galaxy Z series Samsung Galaxy Watch series

Galaxy Note logo in 2013–2014

Galaxy Note logo since 2015

Galaxy Note series release timeline
2011	Samsung Galaxy Note
2012	Samsung Galaxy Note II
2013	Samsung Galaxy Note 3
2014	Samsung Galaxy Note 3 Neo
2014	Samsung Galaxy Note 4
2014	Samsung Galaxy Note Edge
2015	Samsung Galaxy Note 5
2016	Samsung Galaxy Note 7
2017	Samsung Galaxy Note FE
2017	Samsung Galaxy Note 8
2018	Samsung Galaxy Note 9
2019	Samsung Galaxy Note 10
2019	Samsung Galaxy Note 10+
2020	Samsung Galaxy Note 10 Lite
2020	Samsung Galaxy Note 20
2020	Samsung Galaxy Note 20 Ultra

The Samsung Galaxy Note series is a discontinued line of high-end flagship Android-based phablets manufactured, developed and marketed by Samsung Electronics. The line was primarily oriented towards pen computing; all Galaxy Note models shipped with a stylus pen, called the S Pen, and incorporate a pressure-sensitive Wacom digitizer. All Galaxy Note models also include software features that are oriented towards the stylus and the devices' large screens, such as note-taking, digital scrapbooking apps, tooltips, and split-screen multitasking. The line served as Samsung's flagship smartphone model, positioned and slotted above the Galaxy S series, and was part of the wider Samsung Galaxy series of Android computing devices.

The Galaxy Note smartphone series is noteworthy for being considered the first commercially successful examples of "phablets"—a class of smartphones with large screens that are intended to straddle the functionality of a traditional tablet with that of a phone, and having helped accelerate the trend of bigger screened smartphones becoming the norm around the mid 2010s. Samsung sold over 50 million Galaxy Note devices between September 2011 and October 2013.

In August 2021, TM Roh, Samsung's president and head of mobile communications, announced that no new Galaxy Note device would be unveiled at their 2021 launch event, which would instead focus on new foldable phones. "Instead of unveiling a new Galaxy Note this time around, we will further broaden beloved Note features to more Samsung Galaxy devices," he added. Elements of the Note series would later be integrated into certain models of the Galaxy S series since the Galaxy S21 under "Ultra" editions, with the Galaxy S22 Ultra being the first to include an S Pen.

== Phones ==
=== Galaxy Note ===
Samsung announced the original Galaxy Note at IFA Berlin in 2011. While some media outlets questioned the viability of the device due to its 5.3-inch (130 mm) screen (which, at the time, was considered extremely large for a phone), the Note received positive reception for its stylus functionality, the speed of its 1.4 GHz dual-core processor, and the advantages of such a large screen size. Like the Galaxy S2 from earlier that year, the camera has eight megapixels and can film in Full HD, 1080p, and the device features Mobile High-Definition Link (MHL to HDMI).

The Galaxy Note is a commercial success: released in October 2011, Samsung announced in September 2011, that the Galaxy Note had sold 1 million units in two months. In February 2012, Samsung debuted a Note version with LTE support, and by August 2012, the Note had sold 10 million units worldwide.

=== Galaxy Note II ===
On 29 August 2012, at IFA Berlin, Samsung unveiled a successor to the Galaxy Note, the Galaxy Note II. The new model, released September 2012, featured improvements to the original Note's hardware (with a quad-core processor and a larger 5 1/2-inch (140 mm) display, a revised stylus that can reveal Air View tooltips through hovering, and an upgraded digitizer with 1,024 levels of pressure sensitivity for more precise pen input, a new hardware design based on that of the Galaxy S III), along with new features such as pen gestures, split-screen multitasking, Air View (which allows previews of content to be displayed by hovering the pen above the screen), and other new features also introduced by the S III.

=== Galaxy Note 3 ===
On 4 September 2013, Samsung unveiled the Galaxy Note 3, which introduced a more "premium" design with a plastic leather backing, and a 5.7-inch (145 mm) 1080p display, 3 GB of RAM, new 4K video recording capabilities at 30 frames per second (up to 5 minutes per video; availability varies per region), 1080p at twice the framerate (60fps "smooth motion" option), a USB 3.0 connector, an infrared transmitter for use as remote control, a third microphone for noise cancellation, multi-windowing, and expanded stylus pen functionality. Unlike its predecessor, it is not equipped with an FM radio. The speaker is placed at the bottom, while placed on the rear side on the Note 1, 2 and 4.

The Note 3 is the only Galaxy Note device to be equipped with thermometer and hygrometer sensors and Air View support for both stylus and fingers, of which the latter is achieved with an additional self-capacitive touch screen layer. It also had additional voice commands, including "Dismiss" and "Snooze" for the alarm, and "Answer" and "Decline" for calls.

==== Galaxy Note 3 Neo ====
In January 2014, Samsung for the first time released a "downgraded" version of the Note 3, the Galaxy Note 3 Neo. It features the S-Pen stylus, 8 MP camera, 5.5" Super AMOLED HD 720p display, 16 GB storage, 2 GB RAM as well as some of the Note 3's software features (e.g. screen zoom).

For the first time, it has a Samsung Exynos Hexa 5260 (6 core) processor with a quad-core 1.3 GHz Cortex A7 CPU and a dual-core 1.7 GHz Cortex A15 CPU with support for HMP and a Mali-T624 GPU.

The Note 3 Neo lacks both 4K (2160p) and slow motion (720p@120fps) video recording and can record 1080p at only up to 30 frames per second.

=== Galaxy Note 4 ===
On 3 September 2014, at IFA Berlin, Samsung unveiled a successor to the Galaxy Note 3, the Galaxy Note 4. The new model, released on 3 September 2014, introduced a new design with a plastic leather backing and metal frame, a 5.7-inch (145 mm) QHD display, a 16 MP camera with then new optical image stabilization, 15 watts of fast charging using Qualcomm Quick Charge 2.0, revised multi-windowing, an improved S-Pen stylus, an upgraded digitizer with 2,048 levels of pressure sensitivity and expanded functionality, fingerprint scanner, and other features taken from the Galaxy S5. However, Samsung Air View is only usable with the S-Pen, while it was usable with both fingers and stylus on the Galaxy Note 3.

The Galaxy Note 4 is uniquely equipped with an ultraviolet ray sensor, and the last Samsung flagship phone to be equipped with a user-replaceable battery.

==== Galaxy Note Edge ====
Alongside the Galaxy Note 4, Samsung also unveiled the Galaxy Note Edge, which features a display with a curved portion that wraps around the right bezel of the device. The curved area can be used as a sidebar to display news and information tickers, application shortcuts, and other tools.

The curved right side screen area extends the resolution of the display from 1440×2560 to 1600×2560.

The Galaxy Note 4 and Galaxy Note Edge are the last in the Note series to use micro-SIM cards. Later models in the series use nano-SIM cards.

=== Galaxy Note 5 ===
The Galaxy Note 5 was announced on 13 August 2015. It is based upon the specifications, hardware and exterior design of the Galaxy S6, including its metal frame and glass backing, but with a larger 5.7-inch 1440p display, Exynos 7 Octa 7420 system-on-chip, as well as a new spring-loaded stylus slot. As with the S6 and unlike previous Note models, the Note 5 does not offer a user-replaceable battery or expandable storage. Other removed features include support for Mobile High-Definition Link, a third microphone, and an infrared transmitter. The new "Screen off memo" feature allows the phone to be awoken directly to a note screen when the stylus is removed, and the camera app allows public and private livestreaming directly to YouTube.

=== Galaxy Note 7 ===
The Galaxy Note 7 was announced during a press event in New York City on 2 August 2016. It is largely based on the hardware of the Galaxy S7, inheriting its processor, camera, and the restoration of IP68 water resistance and expandable storage, but with a larger 5.7-inch 1440p display. It is also Samsung's first device to feature a USB-C connector and the first water-protected device of the Galaxy Note series, having a water-protected stylus too.

The Galaxy Note 7's display is curved across the sides of the device, and its stylus features higher degrees of pressure sensitivity (4096) and a finer tip. Samsung branded the device as the Note 7 rather than the Note 6 to synchronize its branding with the earlier flagship of the same year, the Samsung Galaxy S7 series.

Upon release, the Galaxy Note series earned criticism by a technology journalist of Android Police, criticizing that since 2015's Galaxy Note 5, not much except a stylus sets the Galaxy Note series flagship apart from the Galaxy S series flagship released earlier in the same year, like it did with the first four generations of Galaxy Note devices.

The Galaxy Note 7 was afflicted by repeated manufacturing problems with their internal batteries, which led to incidents in which they overheated and combusted. After replacement models experienced similar incidents, the Note 7 was officially discontinued on 11 October 2016, and nearly all units were recalled globally.

==== Galaxy Note Fan Edition ====
After the recall of the Samsung Galaxy Note 7, Samsung released the Note Fan Edition (FE) as a refurbished Note 7 in selected countries on 7 July 2017. Although having an identical form factor, the Fan Edition comes with a smaller battery of only 3200 mAh rather than the original Note 7 which is 3500 mAh due to safety reasons.

Improved changes of the Galaxy Note Fan Edition include Android Nougat with Samsung Experience 8.1 UI, Bixby virtual assistant (excluding Voice), a "Fan Edition" marking on the back and a Clear View Cover case.

=== Galaxy Note 8 ===
The Samsung Galaxy Note 8 was announced on 23 August 2017. It features a 6.3" 1440p Super AMOLED Infinity Display, a 3300 mAh battery, Qualcomm Quick Charge 2.0 support, Snapdragon 835/Exynos 8895 processor (depending on location), an iris scanner, IP68 dust and water resistance, a new dual-lens camera setup with a telephoto lens and support for Samsung DeX.

=== Galaxy Note 9 ===
On 27 June 2018, Samsung sent out invitations for the next "Unpacked" event, showing a yellow S Pen image. The Galaxy Note 9 was subsequently announced on 9 August 2018 and became available starting on 24 August 2018.

The Note 9 is a largely refined version of the Note 8. The biggest change from the Note 8 was the addition of Bluetooth functionality to the S-Pen, allowing a user to control the camera, YouTube videos and slideshows remotely.

Internally, the Note 9 uses the Snapdragon 845 or Exynos 9810 processor, with either 6 GB of RAM and 128 GB of internal storage, or 8 GB of RAM and 512 GB of internal storage, and a 4000 mAh battery.

The Note 9 uses the same camera hardware seen on Samsung Galaxy S9 Plus, with a dual camera setup, a 12MP wide-angle sensor with f/1.5 and f/2.4 dual aperture and a 12MP telephoto sensor with the f/2.4 aperture for Bokeh effects at the back, along with an 8MP selfie camera.

=== Galaxy Note 10/Note 10+ ===
On 1 July 2019, Samsung announced that it would hold its second Unpacked event of the year on 7 August at 16:00 Eastern in Brooklyn's Barclays Center. The Galaxy Note 10 and Note 10+ were unveiled at the show.

The Note 10 marked the first time Samsung offered a Plus model of its Note, with the Note 10 offering a 6.3-inch 1080p display Infinity-O Display and 3400 mAh battery, and the Note 10+ offering a 6.8-inch 1440p display with a 4300 mAh battery. The Note 10 has non-expandable 256 GB storage, while the Note 10+ has expandable 256/512 GB storage via microSD. Both phones added several new features from the Samsung Galaxy S10, including in-display fingerprint scanners, Wireless Powershare (enabling the phone to be used to wirelessly charge other Qi-compatible devices), and triple camera arrays consisting of a 16MP ultra-wide angle lens and 12MP wide angle and telephoto lenses. Both variants also saw the power button consolidated with the Bixby button on the left side of the phone, with the button now being reprogrammable to be used as a power button or to activate Bixby, and eliminated the headphone jack.

Also introduced with the Note 10 variants were 25 watts Super Fast Charging (with the Note 10+ also being capable of 45 watt Super Fast Charging 2.0), marking the first charging rate increase since the 2014 Galaxy Note 4.

==== Galaxy Note 10 Lite ====
On 3 January 2020, Samsung announced alongside the Galaxy S10 Lite, the upcoming release of the Note 10 Lite. The Note 10 Lite's main points of interest were that it reintroduced design elements and features had not been used the flagship Note devices in a few generations, such as an entirely flat display (last seen on the Note 5), the reintroduction of the headphone jack (last seen on the Note 9), and the inclusion of an FM radio. Internally, the Note 10 Lite had the older chipset, processor, and GPU from the Exynos version of the Note 9, while incorporating newer features such as the triple cameras seen in the rest of the Note 10 series. To position itself, much as the Note 3 Neo had done, as a more affordable Note device, the pricing was much more comparable to midrange handsets of the time at under half the price of the Note 10+ and lesser than the Note 10. It had introduced the spen to the public at an affordable cost.

=== Galaxy Note 20 / Note 20 Ultra ===
Samsung announced the Galaxy Note 20 and Note 20 Ultra at a virtual Unpacked Event on 5 August 2020. Both came in variants with and without 5G connectivity.

Like the Note 10 line, Note 20 has lesser specifications to justify a relatively lower price point, while the Note 20 Ultra is positioned as a high-end premium device. In this case, the Note 20 Ultra has a 6.9-inch display, 120 Hz refresh rate, 4,500 mAh battery, and expandable storage. The Note 20 lacks several key features of the Note 20 Ultra, including the high refresh rate, microSD storage expansion and "periscope" zoom lens. Both phones have triple camera setups similar to the S20 line, with the Note 20 using two 12 MP wide and ultrawide sensors and a 64 MP telephoto sensor, and the Note 20 Ultra using a 108 MP wide sensor and two 12 MP telephoto and ultrawide sensors. On both models, the buttons and S-Pen have switched places from their positions on the Note 10, with the power and volume buttons now being on the right side of the phone, and the S-Pen dock now moved to the left side of the USB-C port.

This was the last phone launched under the Note series before Samsung decided to bring S-Pen support to the Galaxy S and Z Fold lines, starting with the Galaxy S21 Ultra and Galaxy Z Fold 3 (both of which sold the stylus separately). The Galaxy S22 Ultra, launched in February 2022, features a built-in S-Pen and has remained a staple of every Ultra model ever since. However, Samsung later dropped S-Pen support for its foldables following the launch of the Galaxy Z Fold 7 in 2025 after the display digitizer was removed.

== Tablets ==
=== Galaxy Note 8.0 ===
The Samsung Galaxy Note 8.0 is an 8-inch Android-based tablet computer produced and marketed by Samsung Electronics. It belongs to the second generation of the Samsung Galaxy Note series tablets, which also includes a 10.1-inch model, the Galaxy Note 10.1 2014 Edition.

=== Galaxy Note 10.1 ===
At the Mobile World Congress 2012, Samsung announced the Galaxy Note 10.1, as an alternative to the Galaxy Tab 10.1. It has a 10.1-inch display and uses a quad-core 1.4 GHz processor and supports the Samsung S-Pen stylus input as seen on the original Galaxy Note phone.

=== Galaxy Note 10.1 2014 Edition ===
At the 2013 Samsung Unpacked Episode 2 event in Berlin and New York, Samsung announced the successor to the original Galaxy Note 10.1-inch tablet dubbed as the Galaxy Note 10.1 2014 Edition. Like its predecessor, it has a 10.1 inch display and now supports the improved Samsung S-Pen stylus input also seen in the Note III and it copies the design cue of its lower-end sibling the Samsung Galaxy Tab 3 10.1 which sports the unified Samsung design first used on the Samsung Galaxy S4.

=== Galaxy Note Pro 12.2 ===
At the 2014 Consumer Electronics Show in Las Vegas, Samsung announced the first Pro line of tablets which included a bigger Samsung Galaxy Note Pro tablet with a 12.2-inch display and also comes with the same S-Pen stylus the Samsung Galaxy Note 10.1 2014 Edition is sporting which is the standard on the Note Series. Its design is similar to the Samsung Galaxy Note 10.1 2014 Edition which has the Samsung standard simulated stitched-leather back.

== Other devices equipped with S-Pen stylus ==
=== Galaxy Tab ===
Subsequently, released together with the first regular Tab A 8.0 and 9.7 models in 2015, Samsung released a model of the Tab A 9.7 equipped with an S-Pen stylus making it the first Samsung Galaxy device to be equipped with the Samsung stylus outside the Note series. In 2017 Samsung released another S-Pen device, the Tab S3. On 1 August 2018, Samsung launched the new tablet: Samsung Galaxy Tab S4 with a new S-Pen. Subsequently, in 2019, Samsung launched the Galaxy Tab S6 with the S-Pen.

== Successors ==
=== Galaxy S21 Ultra ===
The Galaxy S21 Ultra was announced at the Galaxy Unpacked event on 14 January 2021, alongside the Galaxy S21 and Galaxy S21+. The Galaxy S21 Ultra is the first phone in the Galaxy S Series to support the S Pen accessory, albeit sold separately and with limited functionality. It features a 6.8" 1440p "Dynamic AMOLED" curved display with HDR10+ support, "dynamic tone mapping" technology, and a variable 120 Hz refresh rate.

=== Galaxy S22 Ultra ===
The Galaxy S22 Ultra was announced at the Galaxy Unpacked event on 9 February 2022, alongside the Galaxy S22 and Galaxy S22+. Unlike the Galaxy S21 Ultra, the Galaxy S22 features an embedded S Pen, with similar functionalities to the Galaxy Note series and with a faster pen latency of 2.8ms.

== Comparison ==
This table is primarily intended to show the differences between the model families of the Galaxy Note series. The list only covers unlocked and international devices.

=== Phones ===
Model		Note	Note II	Note 3	Note 3 Neo	Note 4	Note Edge	Note 5	Note 7	Note FE	Note 8	Note 9	Note 10	Note 10+	Note 10 Lite	Note 20	Note 20 Ultra
Announcement date		September 2011	August 2012	September 4, 2013	February 2014	September 3, 2014	September 2014	August 13, 2015	August 2, 2016	July 2017	August 23, 2017	July 9, 2018	August 7, 2019		January 3, 2020	August 5, 2020	
Release date		October 2011	September 2012	September 25, 2013	March 2014	October 2014	November 2014	August 21, 2015	August 19, 2016	July 2017	September 2017	August 24, 2018	August 23, 2019		January 10, 2020	August 21, 2020	
Dimensions mm (in)	Height	146.9 (5.78)	151.1 (5.95)	151.2 (5.95)	148.4 (5.84)	153.5 (6.04)	151.3 (5.96)	153.2 (6.03)	153.5 (6.04)		162.5 (6.40)	161.9 (6.37)	151 (5.94)	162.3 (6.39)	163.7 (6.44)	161.6 (6.36)	164.8 (6.49)
Dimensions mm (in)	Width	83 (3.27)	80.5 (3.17)	79.2 (3.12)	77.4 (3.05)	78.6 (3.09)	82.4 (3.24)	76.1 (3.00)	73.9 (2.91)		74.8 (2.94)	76.4 (3.01)	71.8 (2.83)	77.2 (3.04)	76.1 (3.00)	75.2 (2.96)	77.2 (3.04)
Dimensions mm (in)	Depth	9.7 (0.38)	9.4 (0.37)	8.3 (0.33)	8.6 (0.34)	8.5 (0.33)	8.3 (0.33)	7.6 (0.30)	7.9 (0.31)		8.6 (0.34)	8.8 (0.35)	7.9 (0.31)		8.7 (0.34)	8.3 (0.33)	8.1 (0.32)
Weight g (lb)		178 (0.392)	180 (0.40)	168 (0.370)	163 (0.359)	176 (0.388)	174 (0.384)	171 (0.377)	169 (0.373)	167 (0.368)	195 (0.430)	201 (0.443)	168 (0.370)	196–198 (0.432–0.437)	199 (0.439)	192–194 (0.423–0.428)	208 (0.459)
Android OS		2.3.6 Gingerbread	4.1.1 Jelly Bean	4.3 Jelly Bean		4.4.4 KitKat		5.1.1 Lollipop	6.0.1 Marshmallow	7.0 Nougat	7.1.1 Nougat	8.1.0 Oreo	9.0 Pie		10		
Upgradable to		4.1.2 Jelly Bean	4.4.2 KitKat	5.0 Lollipop	5.1.1 Lollipop	6.0.1 Marshmallow		7.0 Nougat	6.0.1 Marshmallow	9.0 Pie		10	12		13		
Display	Size	5.3 in (130 mm)	5.55 in (141 mm)	5.7 in (140 mm)	5.5 in (140 mm)	5.7 in (140 mm)	5.6 in (140 mm)	5.7 in (140 mm)			6.3 in (160 mm)	6.4 in (160 mm)	6.3 in (160 mm)	6.8 in (170 mm)	6.7 in (170 mm)		6.9 in (180 mm)
Display	Resolution	1280 x 800	1280 x 720	1920 x 1080	1280 x 720	2560 x 1440	2560 x 1600	2560 x 1440			2960 x 1440		2280 x 1080	3040 x 1440	2400 x 1080		3088 x 1440
Display	Type	Super AMOLED	Super AMOLED Plus	Super AMOLED										Dynamic Super AMOLED	Super AMOLED	Super AMOLED Plus	Dynamic Super AMOLED
Air View		No	Stylus only	Yes	Stylus only												
SoC		Samsung Exynos 4210	Samsung Exynos 4412 Quad	Samsung Exynos 5 Octa 5420 (LTE Cat4 or 6 version); Qualcomm Snapdragon 800 (LTE Cat6 version)	Samsung Exynos 5 Hexa 5260	Samsung Exynos 5433 (LTE/LTE-A) or Snapdragon 805 (LTE Cat 6)	Qualcomm Snapdragon 805	Exynos 7 Octa 7420	Global: Exynos 8890; USA and China: Qualcomm Snapdragon 820	Exynos 8890	Global: Exynos 8895; USA and China: Qualcomm Snapdragon 835	Global: Exynos 9810; USA and China: Qualcomm Snapdragon 845	Global: Exynos 9825; USA and China: Qualcomm Snapdragon 855		Exynos 9810	Global: Exynos 990; USA and China: Qualcomm Snapdragon 865+	
CPU		1.4 GHz dual-core ARM Cortex-A9	1.6 GHz quad-core ARM Cortex-A9	1.9 GHz quad-core ARM Cortex-A15 & 1.3 GHz quad-core ARM Cortex-A7 (3G) or 2.3 GHz quad-core Krait 400 (4G/LTE)	1.7 GHz dual-core ARM Cortex-A15 & 1.3 GHz quad-core ARM Cortex-A7	1.9 GHz quad-core Cortex-A57 & 1.3 GHz quad-core Cortex-A53 (Exynos) or 2.7 GHz quad-core Krait 450 (Snapdragon)	2.7 GHz quad-core Krait 450	1.5 GHz quad-core Cortex-A53; 2.1 GHz quad-core Cortex-A57	Exynos: 4×2.3 GHz Mongoose & 4×1.6 GHz) Cortex-A53; Snapdragon: Octa-core (4×2.4 GHz & 4×2.0 GHz) Kryo	4×2.3 GHz Mongoose & 4×1.6 GHz) Cortex-A53	Exynos: Octa-core (4×2.3 GHz M2 Mongoose & 4×1.7 GHz) Cortex-A53 (GTS); Snapdragon: Octa-core (4×2.35 GHz & 4×1.9 GHz) Kryo	Exynos: Octa-core (4×2.7 GHz M3 Mongoose & 4×1.8 GHz) Cortex-A55; Snapdragon: Octa-core (4×2.8 GHz & 4×1.7 GHz) Kryo	Exynos: Octa-core (2×2.7 GHz M4 Mongoose & 2×2.4 GHz Cortex-A75 & 4×1.9 GHz Cortex-A55); Snapdragon: Octa-core (1×2.8 GHz & 3×2.4 GHz & 4×1.7 GHz) Kryo		Octa-core (4×2.7 GHz M3 Mongoose & 4×1.8 GHz) Cortex-A55	Exynos: Octa-core (2×2.73 GHz M5 Mongoose & 2×2.5 GHz Cortex-A76 & 4×2.0 GHz Cortex-A55); Snapdragon: Octa-core (1×3.0 GHz & 3×2.42 GHz & 4×1.8 GHz) Kryo	
GPU		ARM Mali-400MP4 (266 MHz)	ARM Mali-400MP4 (400 MHz)	ARM Mali-T628MP6 (3G version) (@600 MHz) or Adreno 330 (LTE version) (@450 MHz)	ARM Mali-T624 (400 MHz)	ARM Mali T760 (Exynos) or Adreno 420 (Snapdragon)	Adreno 420	Mali-T760 MP8	Exynos: ARM Mali-T880 MP12; Snapdragon: Adreno 530	ARM Mali-T880 MP12	Exynos: Mali-G71 MP20; Snapdragon: Adreno 540	Exynos: Mali-G72 MP18; Snapdragon: Adreno 630	Exynos: Mali-G76 MP12; Snapdragon: Adreno 640		Mali-G72 MP18	Exynos: Mali-G77 MP11; Snapdragon: Adreno 650	
RAM (GB)		1	2	3	2	3		4			6	6/8	8	12	6/8	8	12
Storage (GB)		16/32	16/32/64		16/32	32	32/64	32/64/128	64		64/128/256	128/512	256	256/512	128	128/256	128/256/512
Expandable memory		microSD slot (up to 64 GB)				microSD slot (up to 128 GB)		No	microSDXC (up to 1 TB)	microSDXC (up to 256 GB)	microSDXC (up to 1 TB)		No	microSDXC (up to 1 TB)		No	microSDXC (up to 1 TB)
2G GSM/GPRS/EDGE		850/900/1,800/1,900 MHz															
3G WCDMA/HSPA		Yes															
4G LTE		Optional						Yes									
5G		No											Optional		No	Optional	
eSIM		No														Yes	
WiFi		802.11a/b/g/n		802.11a/b/g/n/ac	802.11a/b/g/n	802.11a/b/g/n/ac							802.11a/b/g/n/ac/ax			802.11a/b/g/n/ac/6	
WLAN		Wi-Fi hotspot, Wi-Fi Direct, DLNA				Wi-Fi hotspot, Wi-Fi Direct, DLNA(Cert. not listed)		Wi-Fi hotspot, Wi-Fi Direct, DLNA									
Bluetooth		3.0+HS	4.0+LE					4.2+LE			5.0 (LE up to 2 Mbit/s)						
Connectivity		HDMI support	HDMI support NFC					NFC									
USB port		microUSB Standard 5-pin 2.0 (Via MHL)		microUSB Type B 3.0 (Via MHL 2)	microUSB Standard 5-pin 2.0 (Via MHL)	microUSB Type B 2.0 (Via MHL 2)		microUSB Standard 5-pin 2.0 (Via MHL)	3.1, Type-C 1.0 reversible connector						2.0, Type-C 1.0 reversible connector	3.1, Type-C 1.0 reversible connector	
USB OTG		Supported															
Basic Sensors		Accelerometer, 3-axis Gyroscope, Proximity, Ambient Light, Compass, Barometer													No Barometer	Accelerometer, 3-axis Gyroscope, Proximity, Ambient Light, Compass, Barometer	
Additional Sensors		–	Magnetometer; GLONASS	Temperature; Humidity; Gesture; Magnetometer; GLONASS, self-capacitive touch	Magnetometer; GLONASS	Gesture; Geo-magnetic; RGB ambient light GLONASS; Hall Sensor, Finger Scanner, Note 4 only: Ultraviolet sensor			Iris scanner, fingerprint, heart rate, SpO2				Ultrasonic Fingerprint		Optical Fingerprint, Hall Sensor	Ultrasonic Fingerprint	
Radio		Stereo FM radio with RDS		No											Stereo FM radio with RDS	No	
ANT+ Support		No	Yes														
Rear Camera (Video Recording)		8 MP (1080p HD)	8 MP (1080p HD)	13 MP (4K) (1080p@60fps)	8 MP (1080p HD)	16 MP Smart OIS (4K@30fps, 1080p@60fps, 720p@120fps)			12 MP f/1.7, Dual Pixel autofocus Video recording: 4K@30fps, 1080p@30/60fps, 720p@240fps		12 MP Wide-angle f/1.7 Telephoto f/2.4 2× optical zoom, Dual OIS with Dual Pixel autofocus. Video recording: 4K@30fps, 1080p@60fps, 720p@240fps	12 MP Wide-angle f/1.5-2.4 + 12 MP Telephoto f/2.4 2× optical zoom, Dual OIS with Dual Pixel autofocus. Video recording: 4K@60fps, 1080p@240fps, 720p@960fps	12 MP Wide angle f/1.5-2.4 + 12 MP Telephoto f/2.1 + 16 MP Ultrawide f/2.2 2× optical zoom, Dual OIS with Dual Pixel autofocus. Video recording: 4K@60fps, 1080p@240fps, 720p@960fps	12 MP Wide angle f/1.5-2.4 + 12 MP Telephoto f/2.1 + 16 MP Ultrawide f/2.2 + ToF 3D VGA; 2× optical zoom, Dual OIS with Dual Pixel autofocus. Video recording: 4K@60fps, 1080p@240fps, 720p@ 960fps	12 MP Wide angle f/1.7 + 12 MP Telephoto f/2.4 + 12 MP Ultrawide f/2.2 2× optical zoom, Dual OIS with Dual Pixel autofocus. Video recording: 4K@30/60fps, 1080p@30/60/240fps, 720p@960fps	12 MP Wide angle f/1.8 + 64 MP Telephoto f/2.0 + 12 MP Ultrawide f/2.2 3× hybrid zoom, Dual OIS with Dual Pixel autofocus. Video recording: 8K@24fps, 4K@30/60fps, 1080p@30/60/240fps, 720p@960fps	108 MP Wide angle f/1.8 + 12 MP Telephoto f/3.0 + 12 MP Ultrawide f/2.2 5× optical zoom, Dual OIS with Dual Pixel autofocus. Video recording: 8K@24fps, 4K@30/60fps, 1080p@30/60/240fps, 720p@960fps
Front Camera		2 MP (with VGA video recording)	1.9 MP (with 720p video recording)	2 MP (with 1080p FHD video recording)		3.7 MP with f/1.9 (with 1440p QHD video recording)		5 MP (f/1.9, video 1440p QHD)	5 MP (f/1.7, Auto HDR)		8 MP, f/1.7, autofocus, 1/3.6" sensor size, 1.22 μm pixel size, 1440p@30fps, dual video call, Auto HDR		10 MP, f/2.2, autofocus, 1/3" sensor size, 1.22 μm pixel size, 4K@30fps, dual video call, Auto HDR		32 MP, f/2.2, autofocus, 1/2.8" sensor size, 0.8 μm pixel size, 1080p@30fps, HDR	10 MP, f/2.2, autofocus, 1/3.2" sensor size, 1.22 μm pixel size, 4K@30/60fps, dual video call, Auto HDR	
Battery capacity	Capacity	2,500 mAh	3,100 mAh	3,200 mAh	3,100 mAh	3,220 mAh; 3,000 mAh (Dual-SIM)	3,000 mAh		3,500 mAh	3,200 mAh	3,300 mAh	4,000 mAh	3,500 mAh	4,300 mAh	4,500 mAh	4,300 mAh	4,500 mAh
Battery capacity	Removable	Yes						No									
Charging speed						15 watts (via Qualcomm Quick Charge 2.0)							max. 25 watts (USB-PD)	max. 45 watts (USB-PD)	max. 25 watts (USB-PD)		
Model numbers		3G: N7000; LTE: N7005	3G: N7100; LTE: N7105	3G: N9000; LTE: N9005	3G: N7500; LTE: N7505	SM-N910x	SM-N915x	SM-N920x	SM-N930x	SM-N935x	SM-N950x	SM-N960x	SM-N970x	SM-N975x	SM-N770F	SM-N980x	SM-N985x

=== Tablets ===
	Galaxy Note 8.0 (GT-N5100/N5110/N5120)	Galaxy Note 10.1 (GT-N8000/N8010/N8020)	Galaxy Note 10.1 2014 Edition (SM-P600/P601/P605)	Galaxy Note Pro 12.2 (SM-P900/P905)
Release date	February 2013	August 2012	October 2013	February 2014
Dimensions	H 210.8 mm (8.30 in); W 135.9 mm (5.35 in); D 8.1 mm (0.32 in)	H 262 mm (10.31 in); W 180 mm (7.09 in); D 8.9 mm (0.35 in)	H 243.1 mm (9.57 in); W 171.4 mm (6.75 in); D 7.9 mm (0.31 in)	H 295.6 mm (11.64 in) W 204 mm (8.0 in) D 7.95 mm (0.313 in)
Weight w/battery	338 g (11.9 oz)	599 g (21.1 oz)	537 g (18.9 oz)	750 g (1.65 lb)
Android OS	4.1.2 Jelly Bean	4.0.4 Ice Cream Sandwich	4.3 Jelly Bean	4.4.2 KitKat
Upgradable to	4.4.2 KitKat		5.1.1 Lollipop	5.0.2 Lollipop
Display	8.0-inch HD WXGA (800x1280) TFT (189 ppi)	10.1-inch HD WXGA (800x1280) Super PLS TFT (150 ppi)	10.1-inch HD WQXGA (2560x1600) Super Clear PLS TFT (299 ppi)	12.2-inch HD WQXGA (2560×1600) TFT (247 ppi)
SoC	Samsung Exynos 4412 Quad		Samsung Exynos 5420 (Wi-Fi & Wi-Fi+3G) or Snapdragon 800 (LTE)	Samsung Exynos 5420 (Wi-Fi) or Snapdragon 800 (LTE)
CPU	1.6 GHz quad-core ARM Cortex-A9	1.4 GHz quad-core ARM Cortex-A9	2.1 GHz quad-core ARM Cortex-A57 & 1.5 GHz quad-core ARM Cortex-A53	Octa-core (4x1.9 GHz Cortex-A15 & 4x1.3 GHz Cortex-A7)
GPU	ARM Mali-400MP4 (400 MHz)		ARM Mali-T628MP6 (600 MHz) Wi-Fi & Wi-Fi+3G model	ARM Mali-T628MP6 (Wi-Fi model)
GPU (LTE models)	–		Adreno 330 (450 MHz)	Adreno 330 Wi-Fi+4G model
RAM	2 GB		3 GB	
Storage	16 or 32 GB	16 or 32 or 64 GB		32 or 64 GB
Expandable memory	microSD slot (up to 64 GB)			microSDXC slot (up to 128 GB)
2G GSM/GPRS/EDGE	Optional			
3G WCDMA/HSPA	Optional			
4G LTE	Optional			
WiFi	802.11a/b/g/n/ac		802.11a/b/g/n	802.11a/b/g/n/ac (2.4 & 5 GHz)
WLAN	Wi-Fi hotspot, Wi-Fi Direct, DLNA			
Bluetooth	4.0+LE			
Connectivity	HDMI support			
micro USB	Standard 5-pin 2.0 (Via MHL)			Standard 10-pin 3.0 (Via MHL)
USB OTG	Supported			
Basic Sensors	Accelerometer, 3-axis Gyroscope, Proximity, Ambient Light, Compass, Barometer			
Additional Sensors	Magnetometer; GLONASS		Temperature; Humidity; Gesture; Magnetometer; GLONASS	
Radio	NO			
ANT+ Support	YES			
Rear Camera (Video Recording)	5 MP (720p HD)	5 MP (1080p Full HD)	8 MP (1080p Full HD)	
Front Camera	1.3 MP (with 720p video recording)	1.9 MP (with 720p video recording)	2 MP (with 1080p video recording)	
Battery	4,600 mAh	7,000 mAh	8,220 mAh	9,500 mAh
	Galaxy Note 8.0 (N5100/N5110/N5120)	Galaxy Note 10.1 (N8000/N8010/N8020)	Galaxy Note 10.1 2014 Edition (P600/P601/P605)	Galaxy Note Pro 12.2 (P900/P905)

== See also ==
- S Pen
- Samsung Galaxy S series
- Samsung Galaxy Tab series
- LG V series
- LG G3 Stylus
- Huawei Mate series
- Phablet
