= Samsung Galaxy Round =

2013 curved smartphone by Samsung Electronics

- Brand: Samsung
- Manufacturer: Samsung Electronics
- Type: Phablet
- Series: Samsung Galaxy
- First released: South Korea October 10, 2013; 13 years ago
- Successor: Samsung Galaxy Note Edge
- Related: Samsung Galaxy S4; Samsung Galaxy Note 3 Samsung Galaxy Note 3 Neo
- Form factor: Slate
- Dimensions: 151.1 mm (5.95 in) H 79.6 mm (3.13 in) W 7.9 mm (0.31 in) D
- Weight: 144.3 g (5.09 oz)
- Operating system: Android 4.3 Jelly Bean with TouchWiz Nature UX 2.5, can be updated to Android 4.4.2 "KitKat"
- System-on-chip: Qualcomm Snapdragon 800
- CPU: 2.3 GHz quad-core Krait 400
- GPU: Adreno 330
- Memory: 3 GB LPDDR3
- Storage: 32 GB flash memory
- Removable storage: microSDXC up to 64 GB
- Battery: 2,800 mAh; User replaceable
- Rear camera: 13-megapixel, camera with autofocus, BSI, 1080p and 4K video recording
- Front camera: 2-megapixel
- Display: 5.7 in (140 mm) Full HD Super AMOLED 388 ppi (1920×1080)
- Connectivity: List: Wi-Fi :802.11 a/b/g/n/ac (2.4/5 GHz); Wi-Fi Direct; Wi-Fi hotspot; DLNA; Miracast; GPS/GLONASS; NFC; Bluetooth 4.0; Infrared; USB 3.0 micro-B port; USB OTG 1.3; MHL 2.0; HDMI (TV-out, via MHL A\V link); 3.5 millimetres (0.14 in) headphone jack
- Data inputs: List: Multi-touch touch screen; 3 push buttons; Headset controls; Proximity sensor; Ambient light sensors; 3-axis gyroscope; Magnetometer; Accelerometer; Barometer; Hall-effect sensor; hygrometer; magnetometer; gesture sensor; thermometer; aGPS; GLONASS; RGB light sensor; Stereo FM radio
- Website: Official website

The Samsung Galaxy Round is an Android-based phablet-sized smartphone manufactured, developed and produced by Samsung Electronics. Unveiled in October 2013, it is a curved variation of the Galaxy Note 3 that was distinguished by being the first commercially produced smartphone to feature a curved display. It launched exclusively on SK Telecom in South Korea on October 10, 2013.

== Specifications ==
The Galaxy Round's design and hardware is based heavily upon the Galaxy Note 3, featuring the same overall design (including a plastic leather rear cover. The device was made available only in a "Luxury Brown" color), but the entire body is curved inward length-wise, is slightly thinner and lighter in comparison, and does not include a stylus. Similarly to the Note 3, the Galaxy Round includes a 2.3 GHz quad-core Qualcomm Snapdragon 800 system-on-chip with 3 GB of RAM, a 5.7-inch 1080p Super AMOLED display, and a 13-megapixel rear-facing camera. The Galaxy Round includes a removable, 2,800 mAh battery.

The Galaxy Round shipped with Android 4.3 "Jelly Bean" and Samsung's proprietary TouchWiz user interface and software. It contains additional features meant to leverage the curved body, such as "Quick Glance", which displays a clock and notifications when the phone is pushed upwards on one of its sides, and going back and forward between songs in the Samsung music player app by bouncing the left or right side of the phone respectively while in standby.

== Reception ==
CNET praised the device for its inheritance of the "top-tier" hardware of the Note 3 and its innovative form factor, noting that it had "subtle slants and attention to ergonomic detail", and produced less glare when watching videos. The Galaxy Round was considered to be "[an] ergonomically minded high-end smartphone [that] offers practical, real-world benefits" and "opens the door to a lot of interesting and potentially useful applications for any electronic device topped with a touch screen".

== See also ==
- Samsung Electronics
- LG G Flex
- Samsung Galaxy Note Edge
