= Samsung Galaxy Note 10.1 2014 Edition =

Android-based tablet computer

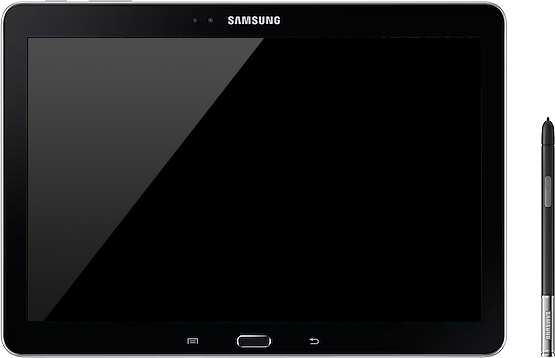
- Samsung Galaxy Note 10.1 2014 Edition
- Also known as: SM-P600 (Wifi); SM-P601 (3G & Wifi); SM-P602 (3G & Wifi, Turkey); SM-P605 (LTE, 3G & Wifi); SM-P607T (LTE, 3G & Wifi)
- Developer: Samsung
- Product family: Galaxy Note
- Type: Tablet, media player, PC
- Released: 10 October 2013; 12 years ago
- Media: MP4, MP3, WMA, MPEG, 3GP, AAF, GIF, ASF, DAT, M4V, SVI, FLA, FLR, WRAP, PPG, Ogg, WMV
- Operating system: Android 4.3 "Jelly Bean" with TouchWiz Nature UX 2.5 (Upgradable to Android 5.1.1 "Lollipop")
- CPU: 1.9 GHz octa-core Samsung Exynos 5420 SoC processor (Wi-Fi/3G & Wi-Fi) or 2.3 GHz quad-core Snapdragon 800 SoC processor (4G/LTE)
- Memory: 3 GB
- Storage: 16, 32, 64 GB flash memory, microSDXC slot (up to 64 GB)
- Display: 2560×1600 px, 10.1 in (26 cm) diagonal, WQXGA 299PPI TFT display (4 megapixels)
- Graphics: ARM Mali-T628MP6 (Wi-Fi, Wi-Fi & 3G versions), or Adreno 330 (4G/LTE model)
- Input: Multi-touch screen, Wacom digitizer, digital compass, proximity, gyroscope, accelerometer and ambient light sensors
- Camera: 8 MP rear-facing 2 MP front-facing
- Connectivity: LTE 150 / 50 Mbit/s hexa-band 800, 850, 900, 1,800, 2,100, 2,600 MHz (4G, LTE model); HSPA+ 42, 5.76 Mbit/s 850, 900, 1,900, 2,100 MHz (4G, LTE model); HSPA+ 21 Mbit/s 850, 900, 1,900, 2,100 MHz (3G, Wi-Fi model); HSPA+ 850, 1,700, 1,900 LTE 2, 4, 5, 17 (SM-607T); Wi-Fi 802.11a/b/g/n/ac (2.4, 5 GHz), Bluetooth 4.0, HDMI (external cable)
- Power: 8,220 mAh Li-Ion battery
- Dimensions: 243.1 mm (9.57 in) H 171.4 mm (6.75 in) W 7.9 mm (0.31 in) D
- Weight: 535 g (1.179 lb)
- Predecessor: Samsung Galaxy Note 10.1
- Successor: Samsung Galaxy Tab S 10.5
- Related: Samsung Galaxy Note 3; Samsung Galaxy Tab 3 10.1
- Website: 2014galaxynote10.1

The Samsung Galaxy Note 10.1 2014 Edition is a 10.1-inch Android-based tablet computer produced and marketed by Samsung Electronics. It belongs to the new generation of the Samsung Galaxy Note series tablets, which also includes an 8-inch model, the Samsung Galaxy Note 8.0 and a 12-inch model, the Samsung Galaxy Note Pro 12.2. It was announced on 4 September 2013, and was launched worldwide in October 2013. It is the successor to the original Samsung Galaxy Note 10.1. The model numbers were originally going to be GT-N8100, GT-N8110, and GT-N8120 for the 3G, Wi-Fi, and LTE variants, respectively, before becoming SM-P601/P602, SM-P600, and SM-P605.

== History ==
The Galaxy Note 10.1 2014 Edition was announced on 4 September 2013. It was shown along with the Galaxy Note 3 and Galaxy Gear at the 2013 IFA at Berlin and at the New York Times Square simultaneously. On September 26, Samsung announced that the tablet would be released in October, starting from $549, and start shipping in the US on October 10.

== Features ==
The Galaxy Note 10.1 2014 was released with Android 4.3 Jelly Bean. Samsung has customized the interface with its TouchWiz UX software. As well as apps from Google, including Google Play, Gmail and YouTube, it has access to Samsung apps such as ChatON (discontinued in March 2015), S Suggest, S Voice, Peel Smart Remote and AllShare Play. Additional pen-oriented features and apps have been added to the Note 10.1 2014 Edition, namely the Air Command menu which provides shortcuts to pen-oriented features such as Action Memos (on-screen sticky notes that use handwriting recognition to detect their contents and provide relevant actions such as looking up addresses on Google Maps and dialing phone numbers), Screen Write, which is an annotation tool, Pen Window, which allows users to draw pop-up windows to run certain apps inside, the search tool S Finder, Scrapbook, My Magazine, which is a news aggregator app powered by Flipboard that is accessible by swiping up from the bottom of the screen, and an updated version of S Note.

The original Note 10.1 may not have come with the latest version of Android out of the box, but the 2014 edition did when it was released. An update to Android 4.4.2 KitKat began for the SM-P605 model in June starting from the Nordic countries, while the upgrade for the WiFi only edition (SM-P600) began in April and started from Colombia. In September 2015, the 2014 editions started receiving an update to install Android 5.0.2 Lollipop. As of April 2026, Lollipop update or any other update is not accessible.

The Galaxy Note 10.1 2014 Edition is available in Wi-Fi-only, 3G & Wi-Fi, and 4G/LTE & Wi-Fi variants. Storage ranges from 16 GB to 64 GB depending on the model, with a microSDXC card slot for expansion. It has a 10.1-inch WQXGA TFT screen with a pixel resolution of 2560x1600. It also features a 2 MP front camera and an 8 MP rear-facing camera. It also has the ability to record HD videos.

The SM-P607T is a 4G/LTE & Wi-Fi version released exclusively for T-Mobile USA.

== See also ==
- Samsung Galaxy Note series
- Samsung Electronics
- Samsung Galaxy Note 8.0

Preceded by Samsung Galaxy Note 10.1	Samsung Galaxy Note 10.1 2014 Edition; 2013	Succeeded by None, latest model
