= Samsung Galaxy Note 3 =

2013 Android smartphone by Samsung

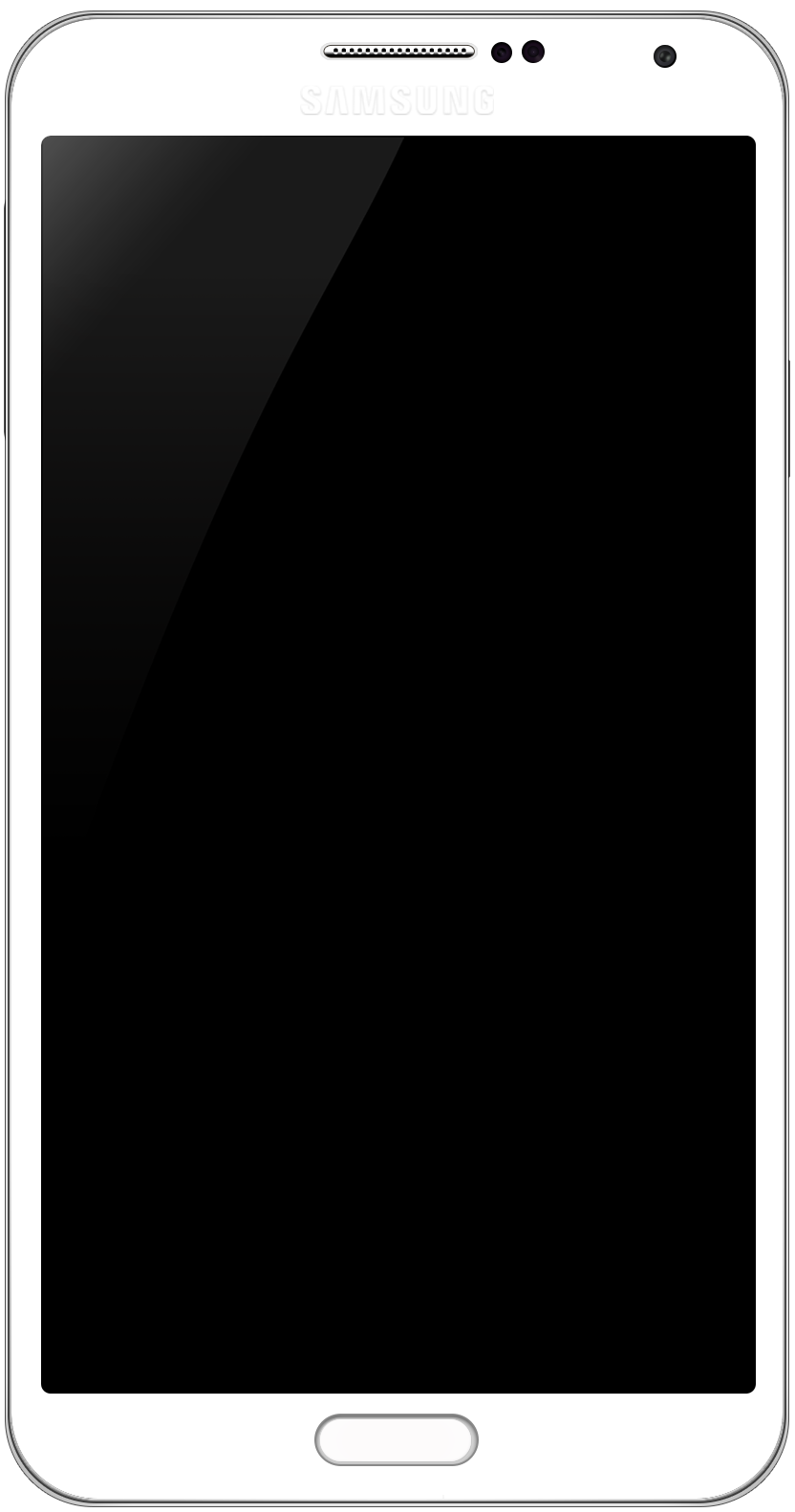
- Samsung Galaxy Note 3 in White
- Manufacturer: Samsung Electronics
- Type: Phablet
- Series: Galaxy Note
- First released: September 25, 2013; 13 years ago
- Discontinued: August 21, 2015
- Units sold: 5 million within first month and 10 million within first 2 months
- Predecessor: Samsung Galaxy Note II
- Successor: Samsung Galaxy Note 4
- Related: Samsung Galaxy Gear; Samsung Galaxy Round; Samsung Galaxy S4; Samsung Galaxy Note 10.1 2014 Edition; Samsung Galaxy Note 3 Neo
- Form factor: Slate
- Dimensions: 151.2 mm (5.95 in) H 79.2 mm (3.12 in) W 8.3 mm (0.33 in) D
- Weight: 168 g (5.9 oz)
- Operating system: Original: Android 4.3 "Jelly Bean"; Current: Android 5.0 "Lollipop" with TouchWiz; Unofficial: LineageOS 21.0 (Android 14)
- System-on-chip: Samsung Exynos 5 Octa 5420 (HSPA+ version); Qualcomm Snapdragon 800 (LTE & China version)
- CPU: Octa-core 1.9 GHz Cortex-A15 and 1.3 GHz Cortex-A7 (HSPA+ version); 2.3 GHz quad-core Snapdragon 800 (LTE & China version)
- GPU: ARM Mali T628MP6 GPU (HSPA+ version); Adreno 330 (LTE & China version)
- Memory: 3 GB LPDDR3
- Storage: 16/32/64 GB eMMC 5.0 flash memory
- Removable storage: microSDXC up to 256 GB
- Battery: 3,200 mAh; User replaceable
- Rear camera: 13-megapixel, f/2.2, with autofocus, BSI, 1080p and 4K (2160p) video recording (Sony Exmor IMX135)
- Front camera: 2-megapixel, f/2.4
- Display: 5.7 in (140 mm) Full HD Super AMOLED 388 ppi (1920×1080) (PenTile matrix) (16:9 aspect ratio) with Gorilla Glass 3
- Connectivity: List: Wi-Fi: 802.11 a/b/g/n/ac (2.4/5 GHz); Wi-Fi Direct; Wi-Fi hotspot; DLNA; Miracast; GPS/GLONASS; NFC; Bluetooth 4.0; Infrared; USB 3.0 micro-B port; USB OTG 1.3; MHL 2.0; HDMI (TV-out, via MHL A/V link); 3.5 millimetres (0.14 in) headphone jack
- Data inputs: List: Multi-touch touch screen; 3 push buttons; Headset controls; Proximity sensor; Ambient light sensors; 3-axis gyroscope; Magnetometer; Accelerometer; Barometer; Hall-effect sensor; hygrometer; gesture sensor; thermometer; aGPS; GLONASS; RGB light sensor; S Pen (Stylus)/Pen
- Model: SM-N900 – GSM; SM-N9000 3G/HSPA+; SM-N9005 – 4G/LTE; SM-N9002 – LTE dual-SIM; SM-N9006 – China/WCDMA; SM-N900A — USA AT&T; SM-N900T — USA T-MOBILE; SM-N900P — USA SPRINT; SM-N900V — USA VERIZON; SM-N900R4 – USA US CELLULAR; SM-N900W8 – CANADA AND LATIN AMERICA
- Development status: Released
- SAR: EU 0.29 W/kg (head) 0.36 W/kg (body); USA 0.9 W/kg (head) 1.25 W/kg (body)
- Website: Official website

The Samsung Galaxy Note 3 is an Android-based phablet-sized smartphone produced by Samsung Electronics as part of the Samsung Galaxy Note series. The Galaxy Note 3 was unveiled on September 4, 2013, with its worldwide release beginning later in the month. Serving as a successor to the Galaxy Note II, the Note 3 was designed to have a lighter, more upscale design than previous iterations of the Galaxy Note series (with a plastic leather backing and faux metallic bezel), and to expand upon the stylus and multitasking-oriented functionality in its software—which includes a new pie menu opened through the button on the stylus for quick access to pen-enabled apps, along with pop-up apps and expanded multi-window functionality. It additionally features new sensors, a USB 3.0 port, 3 GB of RAM, and its video camera has been upgraded to 2160p (4K) resolution and doubled framerate of 60 at 1080p, placing it among the earliest smartphones to be equipped with any of these.

The Galaxy Note 3 is the only smartphone in its series to be equipped with temperature and humidity sensors and a touch screen able to detect a floating finger, all of which were first featured on the Galaxy S4 released earlier that year.

Samsung sold 5 million units of the Galaxy Note 3 within its first month of sale and broke 10 million units sales in just 2 months.

== Specifications ==
=== Hardware ===
==== Design ====
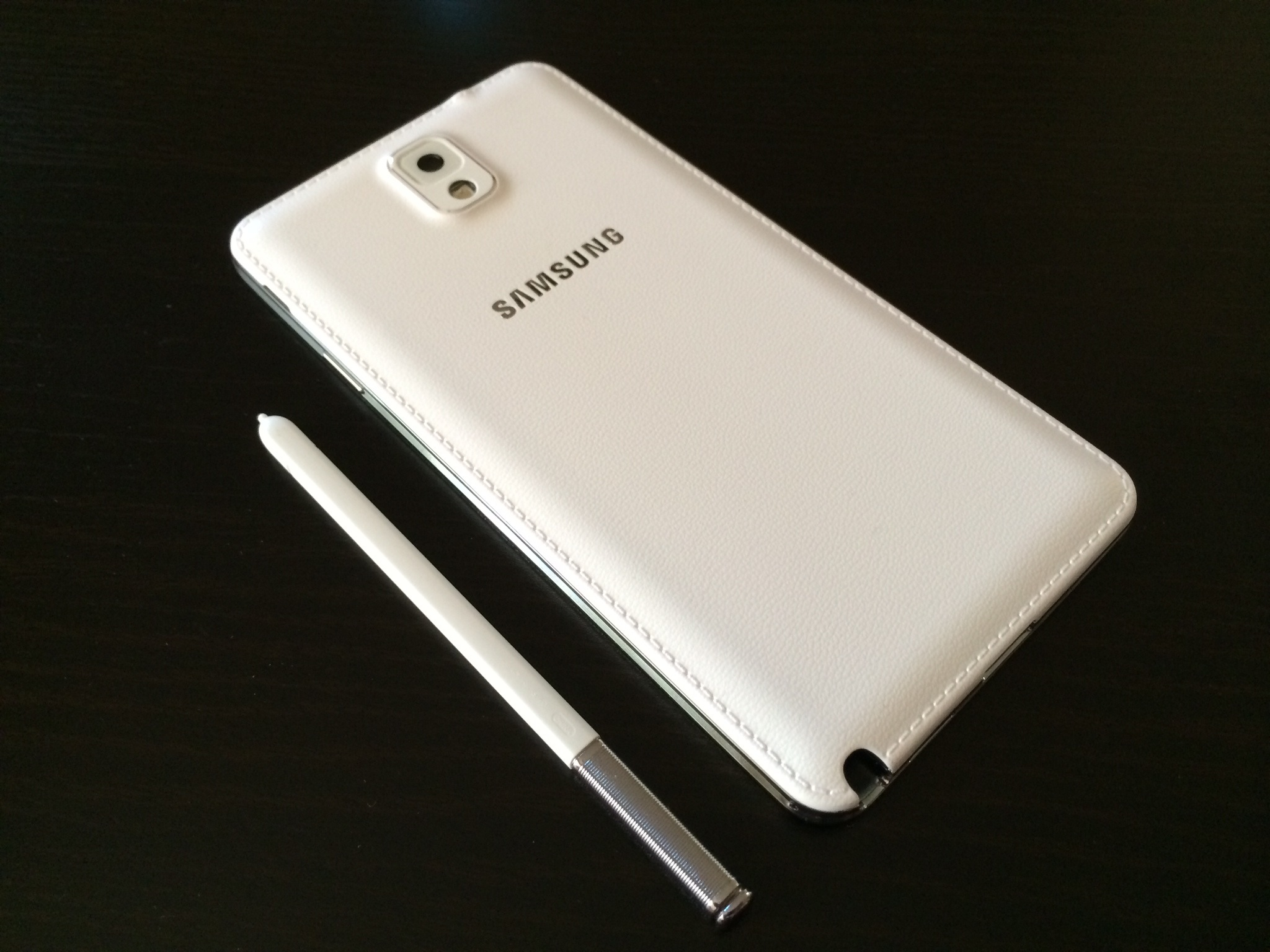
White Samsung Galaxy Note 3 – rear side and stylus

The Galaxy Note 3's design was intended to carry a more upscale, "premium" look in comparison to previous Samsung devices. Although it carries a similarly polycarbonate-oriented design to other recent Samsung devices, the Galaxy Note 3 has a faux metallic bezel and a rear cover made of plastic leather with faux stitching. With a thickness of 8.3 mm (0.33 in), it is slightly thinner than the Galaxy Note II, and is slightly lighter. The speaker is placed at the bottom instead of the back, while placed on the rear side on the Note 1, 2 and 4., in comparison to the back side speaker of the Note 1, Note 2 and Note 4.

The Galaxy Note 3 was first made available in black, white, and pink. In December 2013, Samsung introduced three new color schemes for select markets; black with gold-colored trim, white with rose gold-colored trim, and red with silver-colored trim.

==== Display ====
The display of the Galaxy Note 3 is a 5.7-inch 1080p Super AMOLED display, which is 0.2 inches larger than the 5.5-inch display of the Galaxy Note 2, and a resolution upgraded from the Note 2's 720p display.

==== Storage ====
The device includes 3 GB of RAM for the first time in a mobile phone, and internal storage options of 16 GB, 32 GB and 64 GB.

The Galaxy Note 3 is also the first smartphone to include support for USB 3.0, which enables faster data transfers and charging when connected to a compatible port.

==== Battery ====
The battery size of the Galaxy Note 3 is 3200 mAh, which is 200 mAh higher than its predecessor.

On the Unpacked keynote of the Galaxy Note 3, Samsung has claimed significant improvements over the Galaxy Note 2's battery run time due to increased efficiency, such as four hours of additional video playback time.

==== Chipsets and connectivity ====
The LTE version of the Galaxy Note 3 sold in Europe and North America uses a 2.3 GHz quad-core Snapdragon 800 chip, while the GSM-only model (N900) sold outside aforementioned regions uses an octa-core Exynos 5420, consisting of four 1.9 GHz Cortex-A15 cores and four 1.3 GHz Cortex-A7 cores. Testing has shown similar performance for both models.

Galaxy Note 3 Duos (N9002) is based on the LTE variant but adds an additional second SIM card slot.

==== Sensors ====
The Galaxy Note 3 is equipped with the common sensors (accelerometer, gyroscope, digital compass, front-facing proximity sensor and a barometer sensor). In addition, it has a sensor for the air hand gestures (Quick glance, Air jump, Air browse and Air call-accept) and a Hall sensor for detecting the closure of the S-View Cover accessory.

As the only Samsung flagship mobile phone next to the Galaxy S4, it is equipped with thermometer and hygrometer sensors, mainly used by the Samsung S Health app and some third-party weather station software.

For detecting the floating finger for Air View functionality, the Galaxy Note 3 is equipped with an additional self-capacitive touch screen layer.

==== Camera ====
The Galaxy Note 3 is equipped with a 13-megapixel (4128×3096) rear-facing camera capable of filming video footage in 4K (2160p) resolution at 30 frames per second (capped at 5 minutes per video) and in 1080p at 60 frames per second. Slow motion video footage is recorded at 720p at 120 frames per second, but without audio track.

The pre-installed video player software benefits from the raised video resolution, as it allows zooming in during playback, frame-by-frame navigation while paused, and extracting frames as standalone photographs.

Only the Snapdragon variant can record in 4K. The Exynos variant supports recording at up to 1080p only.

Like the Galaxy S4, released half a year earlier, the rear camera of the Note 3 uses the Sony Exmor RS IMX135 image sensor. The camera software and user interface resembles that of the S4 as well.

The Note 3 is the first Samsung mobile phone and one of the first mobile phones to support 2160p video recording, 1080p at 60 frames per second (compared to 30 fps) and 720p at 120 frames per second.

The front camera has an aperture of f/2.4 and uses the same image sensor as the Galaxy S4, a Samsung CMOS S5K6B2, and similarly captures both photos and videos at 1080p (2.1 megapixels); the latter at 30 frames per second.

==== S-Pen ====
As with other Galaxy Note series devices, the Galaxy Note 3 ships with an S Pen stylus, which has been updated to use a more symmetrical shape.

Like on the predecessor, the Wacom digitizer is able to distinguish between 1024 pressure sensitivity levels.

Removing the stylus from its compartment or pressing its button whilst hovering over the display activates the new "Air Command" pie menu which provides shortcuts to pen-oriented features such as Action Memos (on-screen sticky notes that use handwriting recognition to detect their contents and provide relevant actions, such as looking up addresses on Google Maps and dialing phone numbers), Screen Write (an annotation tool), Pen Window (which allows users to draw pop-up windows to run certain apps inside), the search tool S Finder, and Scrapbook (which allows storing and categorizing image and text excerpts from various apps).

The multi-window functionality has also been updated with expanded app support, the ability to run multiple instances of a single app, and the ability to drag and drop content between apps. The device also ships with a news aggregator app known as My Magazine, accessible by swiping up from the bottom of the screen, and an updated version of S Note.

The Galaxy Note 3 is the first mobile phone with the ability to open a supported range of applications into floating pop-up windows. By default however, the feature is only accessible using the so-called Air Command menu opened using the button on the stylus.

The stylus allows accessing Samsung Air View, which shows a preview of content when hovered above it, including albums in Samsung's precluded gallery software, SMS messages, speed dial contact information, text boxes such as a browser's URL bar and a preview bubble from the seek bar of the Samsung video player (as also known from the desktop websites of YouTube and Dailymotion). The S Pen can also be used for scrolling by hovering it to the upper or lower edge of the screen, and hovering above folders on the home screen does expand the icons.

The Galaxy Note 3 is the only mobile phone in the Samsung Galaxy Note series to support Air View with both the stylus and floating fingers.

==== S-View Cover ====
The S-View Cover accessory is a horizontal flip case with a preview window through which the Android status bar (with battery and signal indicators, and notification icons), a clock, and the number of unread messages and missed calls can be seen.

There are also interfaces for answering incoming calls and snooze or stop a ringing alarm clock, music playback controls, title and artist name, album cover and playlist browser; the ability to create Action Memos (digital post-it notes), weather information, S Health step counter (if activated), and a basic photo camera interface (Note: The S-View cover camera resolution is limited to 3096×3096, the highest quadratic crop of the image sensor, rather than full 4128×3096. Photos are saved to a separate directory: DCIM/CoverCamera.) with the ability to browse recent photos.

The size of the preview window has doubled compared to it on the Galaxy S4, the earliest Samsung device to feature such accessory. Features listed above since music playback controls have been added.

The accessory is attached replacing the default rear cover rather than covering it, and is detected through pins on its inner side rather than a Hall sensor used on the Galaxy S4.

=== Software ===
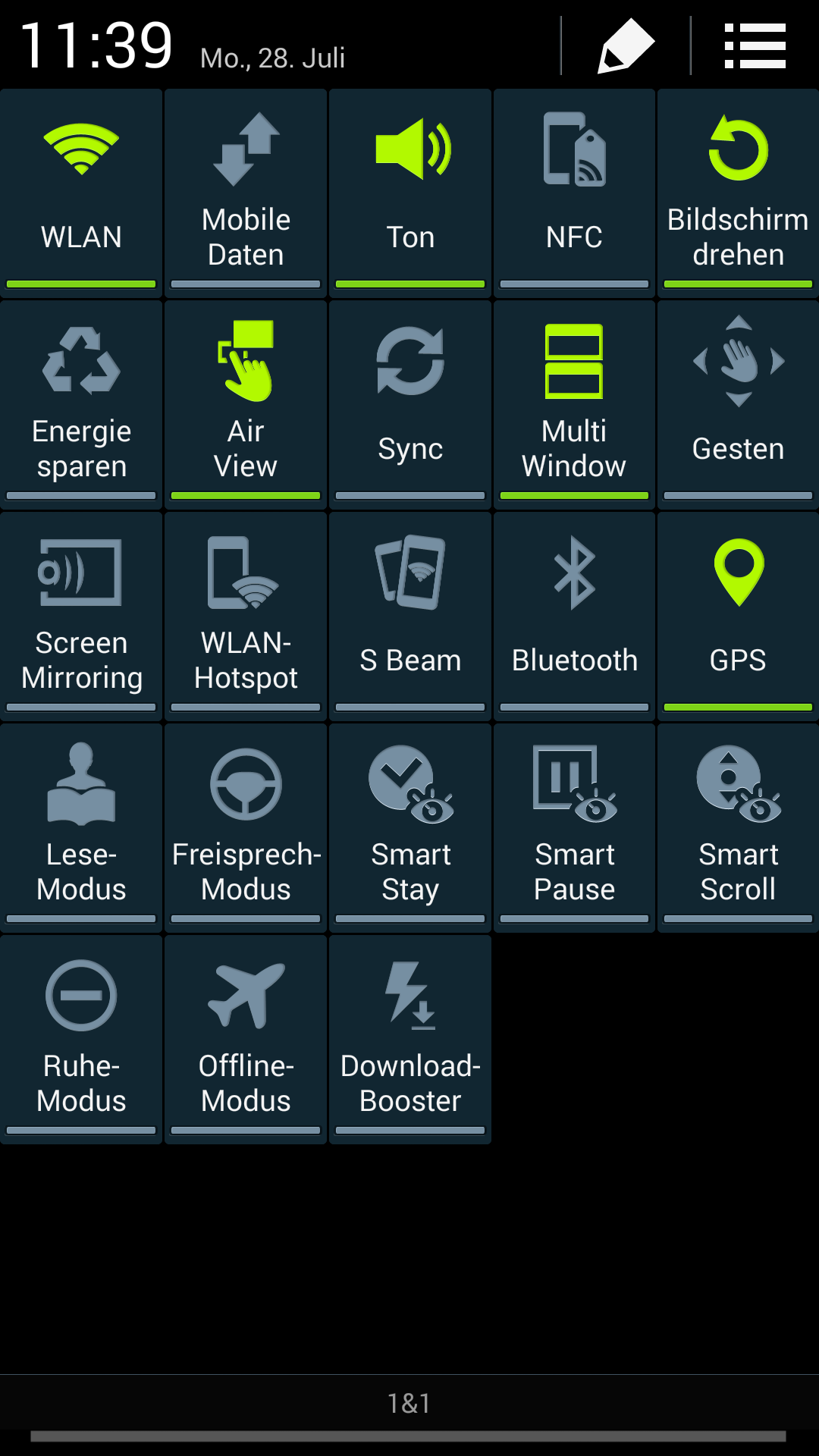
The control menu of the Galaxy Note 3, featuring 23 quick toggles. The "download booster" feature was added with the Android 4.4.2 update.

==== General ====
The Galaxy Note 3 comes with Android 4.3 "Jelly Bean" and Samsung's proprietary TouchWiz NatureUX 2.5 user interface and software. Additional pen-oriented features have been added to the Note 3's software.

The Galaxy Note 3 has inherited the interaction functionality of the Galaxy S4, such as Air View, Air Gestures, Samsung SmartScreen and on-screen motion gestures.

The split-screen view is able to run select applications twice, and allows dragging and dropping items in between.

The Samsung Group Play software introduced on the Galaxy S4 has been extended by the ability to play back video across up to four Galaxy Note 3 units which form a larger screen surface together.

Due to the large screen size of the device, a new feature that allows simulating a smaller screen size for single-handed operation has been added.

An FTP client feature has been added to the precluded "My Files" file manager, and a search feature has been added to the system settings.

In addition to the camera functionality of the Galaxy S4 from earlier that year, a spherical panorama and a "Golf mode" feature were added. Spherical panorama, which is referred to in the software as "photo sphere", merges pictures captured in all directions from a point, and "Golf mode" captures golf swings for forward and reverse playback. A subsequent software update inherited the "Virtual Tour" feature from the 2014 Galaxy S5, which can create 3D room tours with a map which tracks the direction.

==== Android 4.4.2 KitKat update ====
On January 13, 2014, an update to Android 4.4.2 "KitKat" was first made available through Samsung Kies in Poland for LTE models. The update adds user interface tweaks such as a camera shortcut on the corner of the lock screen, options for setting default launcher and text messaging applications, support for printing, and a new location settings menu for tracking and controlling the use of location tracking by apps. 4.4 also makes significant changes to the handling of secondary storage on the device for security reasons; applications' access to the SD card is now restricted to designated, app-specific directories only, while full access to internal primary storage is still allowed. Although this behavior has existed by default since Android 3.0 ''Honeycomb'', OEMs such as Samsung previously modified their distributions of Android to retain the previous behavior, allowing applications to have unlimited access to SD card contents.

The update inherited functionality from the Galaxy S5, including Spherical Panorama and Virtual Tour in the camera software, Download Booster and Samsung Kids Mode.

==== Android 5.0 Lollipop update ====
Samsung began rolling out an update to Android 5.0 "Lollipop" in December 2014.

Changes visibly affected the user interface, replacing TouchWiz Nature UX 2.5 with 4.0.

=== Models ===
There had been 19 models, some for specific carriers, some for specific countries.

==== North America Models ====
- SM-N900A: United States (AT&T)
- SM-N900T: United States (T-Mobile)
- SM-N900V: United States (Verizon)
- SM-N900P: United States (Sprint)
- SM-N900R4: United States (US Cellular)
- SM-N900W8: Canada and Latin America

==== Asia/China Models ====
- SM-N9002: China (Dual-SIM edition)
- SM-N9006: China (WCDMA/Standard open version)
- SM-N9008: China (China Mobile / TD-SCDMA)
- SM-N9008S: China (China Mobile / TD-LTE)
- SM-N9008V: China (China Mobile / Variant)
- SM-N9009: China (China Telecom / CDMA)
- SM-N9009V: China (China Telecom / Variant)
- SM-N900K: South Korea (KT)
- SM-N900L: South Korea (LG U+)
- SM-N900S: South Korea (SK Telecom)

==== Other Regional/Carrier Models ====
- SM-N9007: Australia and parts of Asia (with specific LTE bands)
- SM-N900U: Taiwan and Hong Kong
- SM-N9000Q: Turkey

==== Japanese Models ====
===== NTT Docomo SC-01F =====
The Docomo Smartphone GALAXY Note 3 SC-01F is a dual-mode mobile device supporting NTT Docomo's 3.9G network (Xi) and 3G network (FOMA). It was announced on October 10, 2013 and released seven days later.

===== au SCL22 =====
The GALAXY Note 3 SCL22 was announced on October 2, 2013 for the Japanese market under the au brand by KDDI and Okinawa Cellular Telephone. It supports au 3G and au 4G LTE networks. On October 17, 2013 alongside NTT Docomo SC-01F, the device was officially released nationwide across Japan.

== Release ==
Samsung first teased the unveiling of the Galaxy Note 3 with its announcement of a Samsung Heavy Packed event on September 4, 2013 at IFA Berlin, which contained the tagline "Note the date." The international Galaxy Note 3 was released on September 25, 2013 in over 140 countries, while its U.S. and Japanese releases were released in October 2013. All Galaxy Note 3s will also include a free one-year subscription to Evernote Premium.

The American, European and Indian models of the Galaxy Note 3 implement a regional lockout system in certain regions; requiring that the SIM card used on a European and North American model be from a carrier in that region. While a Samsung spokesperson claimed that the lock would be removed once a valid SIM card is used, it was reported by users that this was not the case. Although an XDA Developers user developed a tool to clear the carrier blacklist that the system uses, it requires that the phone be rooted. A spokesperson claimed that the system was primarily intended to prevent grey market reselling, although some critics suspected that carriers may have asked Samsung to implement the feature in order to force users to roam while travelling by preventing them from using a local SIM card. Samsung also stated that it implemented a similar policy on Galaxy S III, Note II, S4, and S4 Mini models manufactured after July 2013.

The Note 3 variants (Exynos and Snapdragon) can be easily rooted with TWRP/CWM and have custom ROMS installed. However, the SM-N900V has to be changed to a developer version in order to use TWRP/FlashFire, and the AT&T model can only be used with FlashFire.

== Reception ==
The Verge complimented the incremental improvements to the Galaxy Note 3's hardware and software, considering it to be the company's "best attempt yet at making touch input optional on a mobile device." Its overall design was considered to be "cohesive and well thought-out" despite Samsung's continuing use of plastic, and subtle changes such as a symmetrically-shaped stylus were also noted. However, the My Magazine app was panned for being a "tacked on" gimmick. TechRadar considered the Galaxy Note 3 to be an evolution in comparison to its predecessor (including its faster hardware and bigger screen), but criticized the device's design for not looking as "slick and premium" in real life as it did during the promotional video.
Some Note 3s had quality control issues. After using it for a short period of time, some users found that the home button on the phone was “loose and began to shift”. Some images uploaded by affected users shows that the Home button would shift up, down, left, or right when pressing the Home button on their Note 3 after only 3 hours of use. In a poll conducted by Android Police, there were 2,017 Note 3 users complaining that their home button was affected, but only 1150 users did not encounter this problem.

The phone was noted as being used for taking the Oscar Selfie at the 86th Academy Awards. It has since been considered an example of successful product placement, with the tweet posting the photo being valued at $800 million to $1 billion by Samsung's international marketing representatives, Publicis.

== See also ==
- Samsung Galaxy Note series
- Samsung Galaxy Note 3 Neo

== Notes ==
Preceded by Samsung Galaxy Note II	Samsung Galaxy Note 3; 2013	Succeeded by Samsung Galaxy Note 4
