= Samsung Galaxy Note II =

Android phablet smartphone

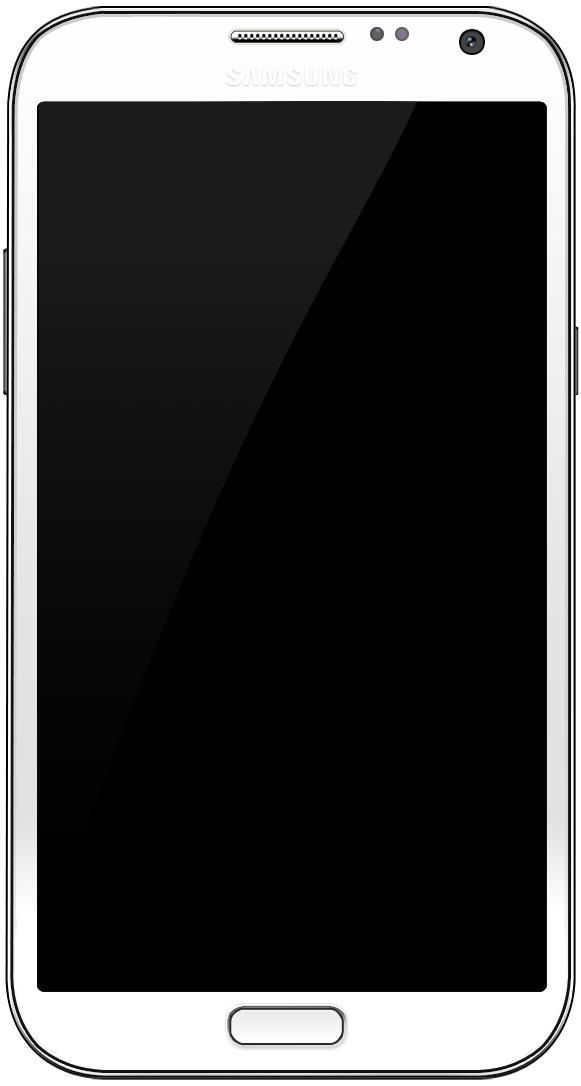
- Samsung Galaxy Note II in White
- Manufacturer: Samsung Electronics
- Type: Phablet
- Series: Galaxy Note
- First released: 26 September 2012; 14 years ago
- Availability by region: 200 countries (Q4, 2012)
- Units sold: 30 million (as of 25 September 2013)
- Predecessor: Samsung Galaxy Note
- Successor: Samsung Galaxy Note 3
- Related: Samsung Galaxy S III; Samsung Galaxy Note 10.1
- Compatible networks: 2G GSM/GPRS/EDGE – 850, 900, 1800, 1900 MHz 2G CDMA 1xRTT; 800, 850, 1900 MHz (Global) & 1.8 GHz Korean Pcs (LG U+); 3G CDMA EV-DO rev 0/A/B; 800, 850, 1900 MHz (Global) & 1.8 GHz Korean Pcs (LG U+); 3G TD-SCDMA; 1900, 2000 Mhz; 3G UMTS/HSDPA/HSUPA/HSPA+/DC-HSPA+; 850, 900, AWS (1700), 1900, 2100 MHz 4G LTE; Bands 1–5, 7, 8, 11–13, 17, 20, 25
- Form factor: Slate
- Dimensions: 151.1 mm (5.95 in) H 80.5 mm (3.17 in) W 9.4 mm (0.37 in) D 9.7 mm (0.38 in) D (SC-02E)
- Weight: 182 g (6.4 oz); 183 g (6.5 oz) (SHV-E250[K,L,S]); 185 g (6.5 oz) (SC-02E)
- Operating system: Original: Android 4.1.1 "Jelly Bean"; Current: Android 4.4.2 "KitKat"; Unofficial: Android 13 (based on LineageOS)
- System-on-chip: Samsung Exynos 4412 Quad (Original) & Qualcomm Snapdragon 600 APQ8064T (China Mobile 4G Network)
- CPU: 1.6 GHz quad-core Cortex-A9 (original) & Krait 300 MP4 1.9 GHz (China Mobile 4G Network)
- GPU: ARM Mali-400MP4 (Original) & Adreno 320 (China Mobile 4G Network)
- Memory: 2 GB LPDDR2-800
- Storage: 16/32/64 GB flash memory
- Removable storage: microSD up to 64 GB
- Battery: 3,100 mAh, 11.78 Wh, 3.8 V Internal rechargeable Li-ion user replaceable
- Rear camera: List: 8.0 megapixels back-side illuminated sensor; LED flash; Full HD (1080p) video at 30 frames/s; Focal length 3.7mm; Aperture f/2.6; Autofocus; Zero shutter lag; Simultaneous Full HD video and 6 Megapixel photo capture; Smile and face detection; Image stabilization
- Front camera: 1.9 megapixels for video chatting, HD video recording (720p)
- Display: List: 5.5 in (140 mm) diagonal with 16:9 aspect ratio widescreen; HD Super AMOLED touchscreen; 720x1280 pixels (267 ppi), non-pentile (S-Stripe RGB) (3 subpixels/pixel); Contrast ratio: 402 (nominal) / 2.307:1 (sunlight); 16M colours
- Connectivity: List: 3.5 mm TRRS jack; Wi-Fi 802.11a/b/g/n (2.4, 5 GHz), Wi-Fi HT40; Wi-Fi Direct; Bluetooth 4.0; microUSB 2.0 with support for USB OTG (supports OTG USB up to 32 GB); NFC; DLNA; S Beam
- Data inputs: List: Multi-touch touch screen; 3 push buttons; Headset controls; Proximity sensor; Ambient light sensors; 3-axis gyroscope; Magnetometer; Accelerometer; Barometer; aGPS; GLONASS; Stereo FM radio; S Pen (Stylus)/Pen UX
- Codename: midas
- Development status: Discontinued
- SAR: Samsung GALAXY Note II Head: 0.171 W/kg 1 g Body: 0.404 W/kg 1 g Hotspot: 0.935 W/kg 1 g; Samsung GALAXY Note II U.S. Cellular Head: 0.23 W/kg Body: 0.95 W/kg
- Website: Official website

The Samsung Galaxy Note II (unofficially known as the Samsung Galaxy Note 2) is an Android-based phablet-sized smartphone developed, marketed and manufactured by Samsung Electronics. Unveiled on August 29, 2012 and released in October 2012, the Galaxy Note II is a successor to the original Galaxy Note, incorporating improved stylus functionality, a larger 5.5-inch (140 mm) screen, and an updated hardware and casing design based on that of the Galaxy S III.

The Note II was released to positive critical reception for its improvements over the original Galaxy Note, and sold over 5 million units within only its first two months of availability. Samsung announced a successor to the Galaxy Note II, the Galaxy Note 3, on September 4, 2013.

== History ==
The Galaxy Note II was unveiled at IFA Berlin on August 29, 2012, and released in multiple markets at the beginning of October 2012. Samsung sold more than 3 million units within the first 37 days and it crossed 5 million in two months of its release.

=== Software versions ===
In December 2012, Samsung began rolling out an update to Android 4.1.2 "Jelly Bean" for the device. In April 2014, Samsung began rolling out an update to Android 4.4.2 ''KitKat'' for the device. Samsung from Denmark, Norway, and Gulf countries has stated several times, including on their official pages that both the 3G and 4G versions of the phone will get the Lollipop update, however the phone never received Android Lollipop.

== Features ==
Technology	GSM / HSPA / LTE

Launch	Announced	2012, August. Released 2012, September
Launch	Status	Discontinued

Body	Dimensions	151.1 x 80.5 x 9.4 mm (5.95 x 3.17 x 0.37 in)
Body	Weight	183 g (6.46 oz)
Body	Build	Glass front, plastic back, plastic frame
Body	SIM	Micro-SIM
Body		Stylus

Display	Type	Super AMOLED
Display	Size	5.5 inches, 83.4 cm^{2} (~68.6% screen-to-body ratio)
Display	Resolution	720 x 1280 pixels, 16:9 ratio (~267 ppi density)

Platform	OS	Android 4.1.1 (Jelly Bean), upgradable to 4.4.2 (KitKat), TouchWiz UI
Platform	Chipset	Exynos 4412 Quad (32 nm)
Platform	CPU	Quad-core 1.6 GHz Cortex-A9
Platform	GPU	Mali-400MP4

Memory	Card slot	microSDXC (dedicated slot)
Memory	Internal	16GB 2GB RAM, 32GB 2GB RAM, 64GB 2GB RAM

Main Camera	Single	8 MP, f/2.6, AF
Main Camera	Features	LED flash
Main Camera	Video	1080p@30fps

Selfie camera	Single	1.9 MP
Selfie camera	Video	

Sound	Loudspeaker	Yes
Sound	3.5mm jack	Yes

Comms	WLAN	Wi-Fi 802.11 a/b/g/n, dual-band, Wi-Fi Direct, DLNA, hotspot
Comms	Bluetooth	4.0, A2DP, EDR, LE
Comms	Positioning	GPS, A-GPS, GLONASS
Comms	NFC	Yes
Comms	Radio	Stereo FM radio, RDS - N7100 model only
Comms	USB	microUSB 2.0 (MHL TV-out), OTG

Features	Sensors	Accelerometer, gyro, proximity, compass, barometer
Features		ANT+ S-Voice natural language commands and dictation

Battery	Type	Removable Li-Ion 3100 mAh battery
Battery	Stand-by	Up to 980 h (2G) / Up to 890 h (3G)
Battery	Talk time	Up to 35 h (2G) / Up to 16 h (3G)

Misc	Colors	Titanium Gray, Marble White, Amber Brown, Ruby Wine, Pink, Blue
Misc	Models	GT-N7100, GT-N7105, SHV-E250S, SHV-E250K, SGH-I317M, SHV-E250L, SGH-T889
Misc	SAR	0.23 W/kg (head) 0.95 W/kg (body)
Misc	SAR EU	0.17 W/kg (head)
Misc	Price	About 300 EUR

Tests	Display	Contrast ratio: 402 (nominal) / 2.307:1 (sunlight)
Tests	Camera	Photo / Video
Tests	Loudspeaker	Voice 70dB / Noise 66dB / Ring 80dB
Tests	Audio quality	Noise -90.2dB / Crosstalk -90.7dB
Tests	Battery (old)	Endurance rating 69h

=== Split-screen ===
The Galaxy Note 2 is able to show two applications at the same time with flexible width on the screen with its split-screen feature. However, support of this feature varies per app.

== Specifications ==
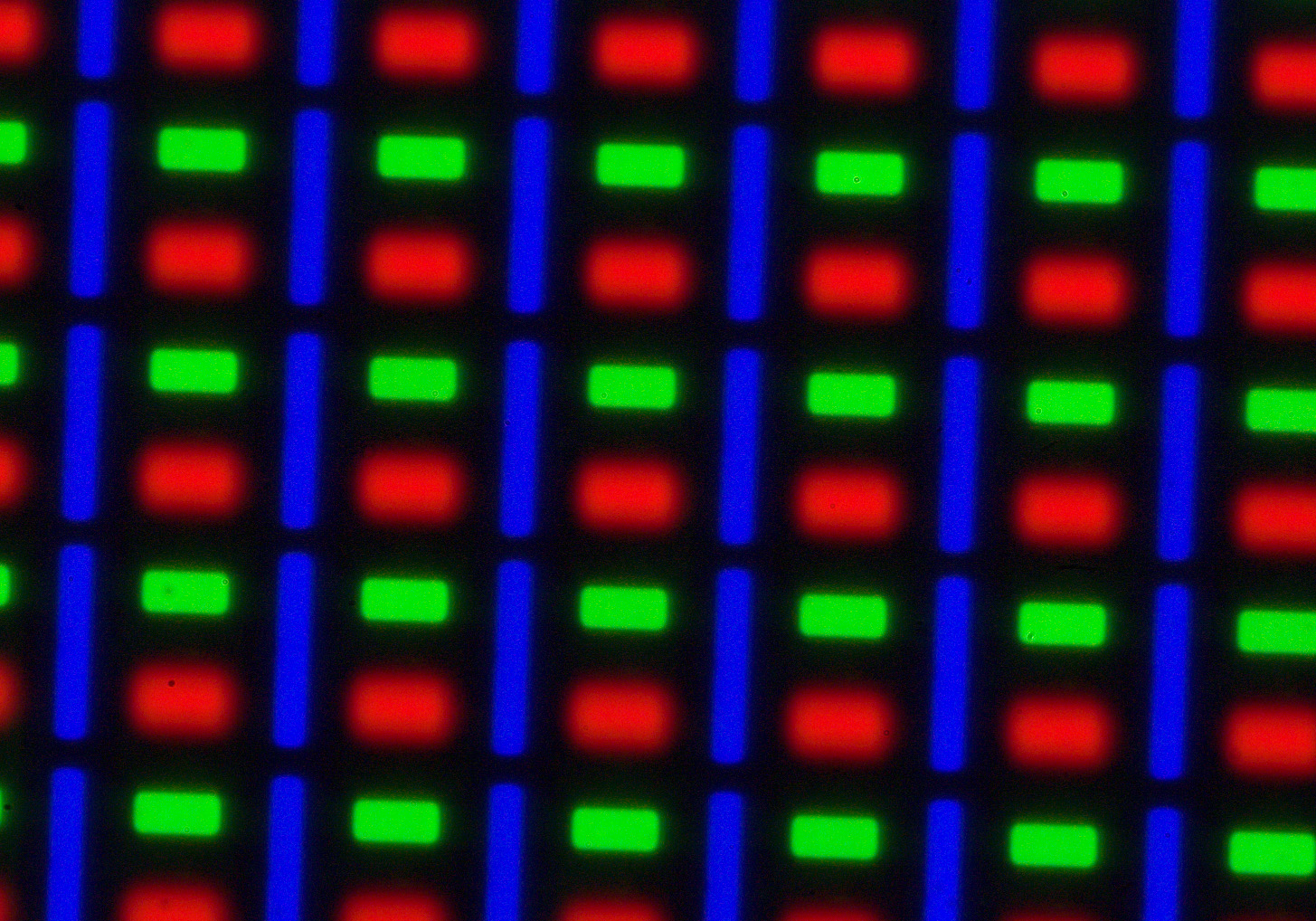
A photograph of the Galaxy Note II's S-Stripe RGB (non-PenTile) subpixels

=== General ===
The Galaxy Note II features a 5.5-inch HD Super AMOLED S-Stripe RGB (3 subpixels/pixel) (non-PenTile) screen with 1280 × 720 resolution, a 1.6 GHz quad-core Cortex-A9 CPU, 2 GB RAM, an 8 MP rear camera and 1.9 MP front camera, and a 3,100 mAh battery. It is slightly thinner than its predecessor at 9.4 mm (0.37 inches), albeit also being slightly heavier by 2 grams (0.071 oz). Depending on the specific model, the phone features HSPA+ 21 Mbit/s along with 4G LTE (42.2 Mbit/s DC-HSPA+ for LTE Version). The Galaxy Note II is equipped with Broadcom BCM4334 chipset for the IEEE 802.11 a/b/g/n Wi-Fi connectivity in 2.4 GHz and 5 GHz dual-band with maximum rate up to 150 Mbit/s, FM radio tuner and Bluetooth 4.0 + HS support.

=== Storage ===
The Galaxy Note II was supposed to be available in 16 GB, 32 GB and 64 GB storage capacity variants, each expandable by up to an additional 64 GB with a microSD card. However, as of 8 January 2013, only the 16 GB and 32 GB versions are available and there has been no release date for or any indication of a 64 GB version of the Note II to be offered.

=== S Pen ===
The smartphone's pressure-sensitive S Pen is slightly thicker than in the original Galaxy Note, and a feature marketed as Air View allows a user to preview content by hovering the pen over the content, similar to the hoverbox feature of a mouse in some desktop computers, such as thumbnails in the gallery and a preview tooltip on the video player's time seek bar, and zooming in the web browser (Samsung S Browser) and for scrolling. Another feature marketed as Quick Command reveals a list of available commands at the swipe of the S Pen.

The S Pen's 1,024 levels of pen-pressure sensitivity give it significantly more accuracy and precision than the original Note's 256.

=== Camera ===
Both front and rear camera use the same hardware as used in the Galaxy S3, with eight megapixels (3264×2448) rear facing camera and 1.9 Megapixels on the front facing camera.

The video resolution of the rear camera is 1080p at 30 frames per second while the front camera films 720p at 30 frames per second.

The Galaxy Note 2 is able to capture 6 megapixel (3264×1836) images during 1080p@30fps video recording, which is the highest 16:9 aspect ratio resolution supported by the 4:3 image sensor, matching the aspect ratio of the video.

While the camera interface resembles that of the Galaxy S3, slow motion mode (720×480 at 120 frames per second) has been added. The slow motion videos lack audio.

The burst shot mode is able to capture up to twenty full-resolution photos per row at around six frames per second.

=== Variants ===
The Galaxy Note II is available in Titanium Grey, Marble White, Martian Pink, Amber Brown and Ruby Wine case colors. Some features were removed, which vary as customized by carrier, include FM/TV tuner, charging pins, and Multiple-SIM card support. To prevent grey market reselling, models of the Galaxy Note II, and other models (Galaxy S4, Galaxy S4 mini, Galaxy Note III and Galaxy S III) manufactured after July 2013 implement a regional lockout system in certain regions; requiring that the first SIM card used on a European and North American model be from a carrier in that region. Samsung stated that the lock would be removed once a valid SIM card is used.

==== Communication processor ====
The baseband chipset of GT-N7100 is Intel Wireless PMB9811X Gold Baseband processor. The baseband chipset of SGH-T889, SHV-E250K, and SHV-E250S is Qualcomm Gobi MDM9215. SHV-E250L has Qualcomm Gobi MDM9615M for the EVDO revision B connectivity.

==== Network connectivity ====
Most of the variants support GSM/GPRS/EDGE in the 850 MHz, 900 MHz, 1.8 GHz, and 1.9 GHz bands; and UMTS/HSPA+21 in 850 MHz, 900 MHz, 1.9 GHz, and 2.1 GHz.

===== AWS phones =====
SGH-T889 and SGH-T889V are devices that support AWS-1 for HSPA networks capable of transferring data over Advanced Wireless Services band in HSPA mode on carriers such as T-Mobile US, and in Canada, Wind Mobile, Mobilicity, and Vidéotron.

===== CDMA/EV-DO phones =====
SCH-R950, SHV-E250L, SCH-i605, SPH-L900, and SCH-N719 are to connect to cdmaOne, CDMA 1xRTT, and EV-DO rev 0/A/B. All models are additionally GSM capable with the exception of the SCH-R950. SPH-L900 can only use WCDMA/GSM services while roaming internationally due to it having an embedded SIM.

===== TD-SCDMA phone =====
GT-N7108 is to support TD-SCDMA networks in the 1.9 GHz and 2.0 GHz bands, and connect to the GSM/GPRS/EDGE 1.9 GHz band.

===== Dual-cell HSPA phone =====
SGH-T889 is known to support dual-cell HSPA+ up to 42.2 Mbit/s.

===== LTE phones =====
- GT-N7105 is an LTE version, that can connect to LTE band 3, 7, 8, and 20 and has 42.2 Mbit/s DC-HSPA+.
- SCH-i605 can connect to LTE band 13, which is what Verizon Wireless uses.
- SCH-R950, SGH-i317[M], SGH-T889[V], SPH-L900, SC-02E (SGH-N025), and SHV-E250[K,L,S] can connect to the LTE bands of each carrier as well as the LTE bands of the other network operators as a roaming service.
- GT-N7108D is a version similar to GT-N7108 but with LTE-TDD support. Also the Qualcomm Snapdragon SoC was used in this version.

==== FM radio, digital TV tuner ====
Only some Galaxy Note II variants have a built-in FM radio tuner. For example, some US and Canadian variants (SGH-i317, SGH-i317M) and the LTE International version (N7105) lack the FM radio tuner support. SC-02E for Japan market has 1seg digital-TV tuner and antenna. Korean variants have the T-DMB tuner as well as the T-DMB antenna that can be concealed in the phone body.

==== Dimension and weight ====
Korean variants with the T-DMB tuner and the T-DMB antenna are 3 g (0.11 oz) heavier than other variants. SC-02E for NTT DoCoMo with 1seg TV tuner is 5 g (0.18 oz) heavier and 0.3 mm (0.012 in) thicker.

==== Wireless charging ====
Depending on the model, some Galaxy Note II (GT-N7100) units have the two optional charging pins on the back side of the device, just right of the battery holder, that can be used for wireless charging with the dedicated wireless charging back cover variant. Galaxy Note II displays the notification message built in the firmware when it is charged wirelessly. SCH-L900 does not have the pins. SGH-T889 has the pins, but they are disabled.

==== Table of variants ====
Galaxy Note II variants
Model	Carriers	2G/3G connectivity	4G LTE connectivity	Notes
International
GT-N7100	International	GSM: quad-band UMTS: 850, 900, 1900, 2100	No	Optional inductive charging pins
GT-N7105	International	GSM: quad-band UMTS: 850, 900, 1900, 2100	800^{(band 20)} 900^{(band 8)} 1800^{(band 3)} 2600^{(band 7)}	Inductive charging pins No FM radio 42.2 Mbit/s DC-HSPA+
North American carriers
SCH-i605	Verizon	GSM: quad-band; CDMA/EVDO: **850**, **1900**; UMTS: quad-band	**700**^{(band 13)}	No inductive charging pins Home Button Verizon Branding
SCH-R950	US Cellular	CDMA/EVDO: **850**, 1700, **1900**	**700**^{(band 12)} 850; **AWS**; 1900^{(band 2)}	
SGH-i317	AT&T	GSM: **quad-band** UMTS: **850**, **1900**, 2100	**700**^{(band 17)} 850; **AWS**; 1900^{(band 2)}	
SGH-i317M	Bell; Rogers; SaskTel; Telus; Telcel (Mexico)	GSM: quad-band UMTS: 850, 1900, 2100	700^{(band 17)} 850; **AWS**; **1900**^{(band 2)}	
SGH-T889	T-Mobile	GSM: **quad-band** UMTS/DC-HSPA+ : 850, **AWS**, **1900**, 2100	700^{(band 17)} **AWS**	LTE AWS from 2013; Optional charging pins disabled
SGH-T889V	Mobilicity; Vidéotron; Wind Mobile	GSM: quad-band UMTS/DC-HSPA+: 850, **AWS**, 1900, 2100	700^{(band 17)} AWS	
SPH-L900	Sprint	GSM: quad-band CDMA/EVDO: **800**, 850, **1900**; UMTS: 1900, 2100	**1900**^{(band 25)}	No optional charging pins, embedded SIM
Chinese carriers
SCH-N719	China Telecom	GSM: 900, 1800, 1900; CDMA: 800, 1900	No	Dual-Card dual-standby
GT-N7102	China Unicom	GSM: quad-band UMTS: 900, 2100 MHz	No	
GT-N7108	China Mobile	GSM: 900, 1800, 1900; TD-SCDMA: 1800, 2010; WCDMA: 900, 2100 (**international roaming only**)	No	
GT-N7108D	China Mobile	GSM: quad-band TD-SCDMA: 1880, 2010; WCDMA: 850, 900, 2100 (**international roaming only**)	FDD-LTE: 1800, 2600 (**international roaming only**); TDD-LTE: 1900, 2300, 2600	
Japanese carriers
SGH-N025 /SC-02E	NTT DoCoMo	GSM: quad-band UMTS: **800**, 850, **2100**	**1500**^{(band 11)} **2100**^{(band 1)}	1seg tuner
Korean carriers
SHV-E250K	KT	GSM: quad-band UMTS: 1900, **2100**	**900**^{(band 8)} **1800**	DMB tuner/antenna LTE 900 after 2013.
SHV-E250L	LG U+	GSM: quad-band CDMA: **1800**; UMTS: 1900, 2100	**850**; **2100**^{(band 1)}	DMB tuner/antenna
SHV-E250S	SK Telecom	GSM: quad-band UMTS: 1900, **2100**	**850**; **1800**	DMB tuner/antenna

=== Notes ===
- The bolded frequencies in connectivities, are to support the released carriers' networks.
- All frequencies listed are in MHz.
- "GSM: quad-band" denotes "GSM/GPRS/EDGE: 850, 900, 1800, and 1900 Mhz bands".
- "UMTS: quad-band" denotes "UMTS/HSDPA/HSUPA/HSPA+: 850, 900, 1900, and 2100 Mhz bands".
- "CDMA: dual-band" denotes "CDMA 1xRTT/CDMA EV-DO Rev A/CDMA EV-DO Rev B: 800 and 1900 Mhz bands"

== Release and reception ==
=== Commercial reception ===
The Note II launched on September 26, 2012, in South Korea on three carriers and it was expected to ultimately arrive on 2760 carriers in 128 countries. It is now widely available in the market after its official launch on September 27, 2012, in Hyderabad, India. The Note II was officially launched in the UK on September 30, 2012, available to purchase exclusively from the Samsung flagship stores in Stratford and White City. It was then released to all major stores in the UK on October 1 on ThreeUK, Vodafone and O2 and at retailers such as Carphone Warehouse and Phones4U. It was made available for pre-order in Indonesia on September 29, 2012, on Erafone, Telkomsel, and Indosat. Samsung's mobile chief Shin Jong-kyun expected to sell 3 million Galaxy Note IIs during the first three months of availability. Samsung announced that 8.5 million Galaxy Note II devices had been sold worldwide, based on supply as of November 25, 2012. By September 2013, approximately 30 million units had been sold.

=== Critical reception ===
In September 2012, PhoneArena.com said the device uses "the best phone screen Samsung has ever produced", noting the phone offers improved S Pen performance. Stuff awarded the smartphone 5/5 stars and ranked it number 1 in its "Top 10 Smartphones" section. The Verge awarded the smartphone an 8.5/10 rating and stated that "the Note II is an unambiguous upgrade over its predecessor and can even challenge the Galaxy S III for the title of best Android device". They praised the device's performance and its improved handwriting recognition while criticizing the dearth of S Pen apps.

In September 2016, India's aviation regulator said a Samsung Galaxy Note 2 device sparked and smoked in an IndiGo airplane, which was on its way to Chennai from Singapore. Indian Directorate General of Civil Aviation will send an advisory to airlines warning passengers to keep all Samsung Note smartphones switched off during flights or avoid carrying the phones on commercial jets altogether.

== See also ==
- Samsung Galaxy Note series
- Samsung Galaxy Mega

Preceded by Samsung Galaxy Note	Samsung Galaxy Note II; 2012	Succeeded by Samsung Galaxy Note 3
