= S Voice =

Discontinued intelligent personal assistant

- Final logo used from 2017 to 2020
- Original author: Samsung
- Developer: Samsung
- Initial release: 30 May 2012; 13 years ago
- Final release: 5.0.01.20 (June 7, 2022; 3 years ago) [±] Bixby is a S Replacement launched in 2017.
- Operating system: Android 4.0 "Ice Cream Sandwich"; Android 4.1 – 4.3 "Jelly Bean"; Android 4.4 "Kit Kat"; Android 5.0 – 5.1.1 "Lollipop"; Android 6.0 – 6.0.1 "Marshmallow"; Android 7.0 – 7.1.1 "Nougat"
- Successor: Bixby
- Available in: English, French, Spanish, Korean, Italian, Japanese, Russian, German, Luxembourgish, and Hindi
- Type: Intelligent personal assistant

S Voice is a discontinued intelligent personal assistant and knowledge navigator which is only available as a built-in application for the Galaxy S III, S III Mini, S4, S4 Mini, S4 Active, S5, S5 Mini, S II Plus, Note II, Note 3, Note 4, Note 10.1, Note 8.0, Stellar, Mega, Grand, Avant, Core, Ace 3, Tab 3 7.0, Tab 3 8.0, Express 2, Tab 3 10.1, Galaxy Camera, and other 2013 or later Samsung Android devices. The application uses a natural language user interface to answer questions, make recommendations, and perform actions by delegating requests to a set of Web services. S Voice is based on the Vlingo personal assistant. For Galaxy S5 and later Galaxy devices, S Voice runs on Nuance instead of Vlingo.

Some of the capabilities of S Voice include making appointments, opening apps, setting alarms, updating social network websites such as Facebook or Twitter and navigation. S Voice also offers multitasking, as well as automatic activation features, for example, when the car engine is started.

In a disclaimer that pops up on first opening S Voice, Samsung states that the app is provided by a third party, which it does not name.

In the Galaxy S8 and S8+, Bixby was announced to be a major update and replacement to S Voice from the prior phones. It was discontinued on 1 June 2020.

== Supported phones and tablets ==
=== Flagship smartphones and tablets ===
==== Galaxy S ====
- Galaxy S2 (including S2 Plus)
- Galaxy S3 (including S3 Mini and S3 Neo)
- Galaxy S4 (including S4 Active and S4 Mini)
- Galaxy S5 (including S5 Active, S5 Mini and S5 Neo)
- Galaxy S6 (including S6 Edge and S6 Edge+)
- Galaxy S7 (including S7 Edge and S7 Active)

==== Galaxy Note ====
- Galaxy Note
- Galaxy Note 2
- Galaxy Note 3
- Galaxy Note 4
- Galaxy Note Edge
- Galaxy Note 5
- Galaxy Note 7 / FE
- Galaxy Note 8.0
- Galaxy Note 10.1

=== Mid-range smartphones and tablets ===
==== Galaxy A ====
- Galaxy A3 (2015, 2016 and 2017)
- Galaxy A5 (2015, 2016 and 2017)
- Galaxy A7 (2015, 2016 and 2017)
- Galaxy A8 (2015, 2016 and 2018)
- Galaxy A9 (2016) (including A9 Pro (2016))

== See also ==
- Bixby
- Cortana
- Google Assistant
- Google Now
- Siri
- Amazon Alexa
- Google Gemini

Preceded by Vlingo	S Voice	Succeeded by Bixby
