= Samsung Galaxy A8 (2016) =

2016 Android smartphone

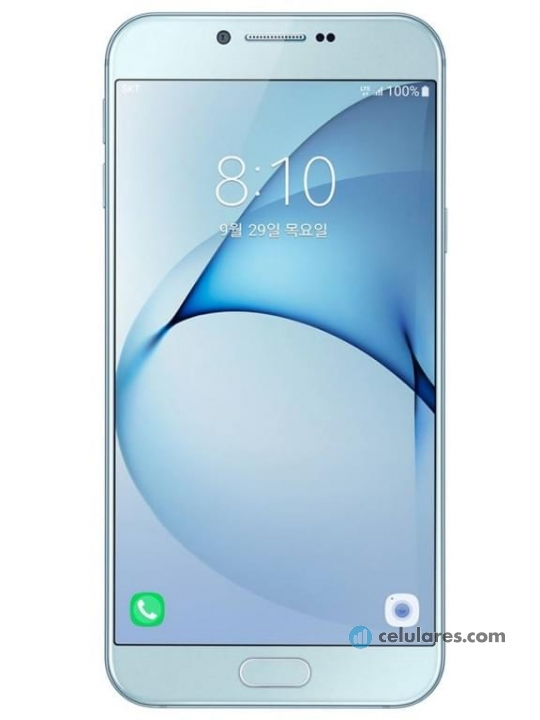
- Samsung Galaxy A8
- Brand: Samsung Galaxy
- Manufacturer: Samsung Electronics
- Type: Smartphone
- Series: Galaxy A series
- First released: September 30, 2016; 10 years ago
- Availability by region: October 1, 2016
- Predecessor: Samsung Galaxy A8 (2015)
- Successor: Samsung Galaxy A8 (2018)
- Related: Samsung Galaxy A3 (2016); Samsung Galaxy A5 (2016); Samsung Galaxy A7 (2016); Samsung Galaxy A9 (2016); Samsung Galaxy A9 Pro (2016)
- Compatible networks: 2G GSM & EDGE; 3G (UMTS/HSPA/CDMA/TD-SCDMA); 4G (FDD/TDD LTE)
- Dimensions: 156 mm (6.1 in) H 76.8 mm (3.02 in) W 7.2 mm (0.28 in) D
- Weight: 182 g (6.4 oz)
- Operating system: Original: Android 6.0.1 "Marshmallow"; Current: Android 8.0 "Oreo"
- System-on-chip: Exynos 7 Octa 7420
- CPU: Quad-core 2.1 GHz Cortex-A57 + quad-core 1.5 GHz Cortex-A53
- GPU: Mali-T760MP8
- Memory: 3 GB LPDDR3 RAM
- Storage: 32 GB
- Removable storage: up to 256 GB
- Battery: non-removable Li-Ion 3500 mAh with fast-charging technology
- Rear camera: 16 MP ISOCELL sensor
- Front camera: 5 MP sensor
- Display: 5.7 in (140 mm) 1920x1080 pixel (386 ppi) Full HD Super AMOLED; Gorilla Glass 4
- Connectivity: WLAN, NFC, Bluetooth 4.2, USB
- Data inputs: List: Multi-touch capacitive touchscreen; Fingerprint sensor; 3 push buttons; aGPS; GLONASS; Accelerometer; Digital compass
- Model: A810F (Global - Single SIM); A810F/DS (Global - Dual SIM); A810S (South Korea)

The Samsung Galaxy A8 (2016) (stylized as SAMSUNG Galaxy A8_{6}) is an Android-based phablet produced by Samsung Electronics. It was introduced on September 30, 2016 by South Korean telecom provider SK Telecom. Unlike most Galaxy A series smartphones, the Galaxy A8 (2016) has a better processor similar to Samsung's 2015 flagships, the Samsung Galaxy S6, Samsung Galaxy S6 Edge and Samsung Galaxy Note 5.

Following its release, the Galaxy A8 (2016) is only available in the South Korean market for 649,000 South Korean won (about 580 USD), as of October 1, 2016. Other countries are expected to release the device soon.

== Hardware ==
The smartphone features an Exynos 7420 SoC consisting of 4 ARM Cortex-A57 and 4 Cortex-A53 backed by the Mali-T760MP8 GPU and sports 3 GB of RAM and 32 GB internal storage, expandable to 256 GB via a MicroSD slot which can also be used for a second Nano-SIM (in international versions). The device retains a non-removable battery like its predecessor, rated at 3500 mAh with Adaptive Fast Charging technology. The Galaxy A8 (2016) also has a fingerprint scanner and support for Samsung Pay with NFC and MST communication technologies.

== Design ==
The Samsung Galaxy A8 (2016) has a full metal body, similar to the previous Samsung Galaxy A8. The Galaxy A8 (2016) has a larger 5.7-inch display compared to the Samsung Galaxy Note 7, but it uses a Full HD Super AMOLED. The Galaxy A8 (2016)’s front display is protected by Corning Gorilla Glass 4.

== Software ==
The Samsung Galaxy A8 (2016) runs Android 6.0.1 Marshmallow with Grace UX interface introduced in the Galaxy Note 7. A new "Always On display" functionality displays a clock, calendar, and notifications on-screen when the device is in standby, similar to Samsung Galaxy S7, S7 Edge.
