= Samsung Galaxy A7 =

Samsung Galaxy A7 refers to five Samsung Galaxy Android smart phones released in the 2010s.

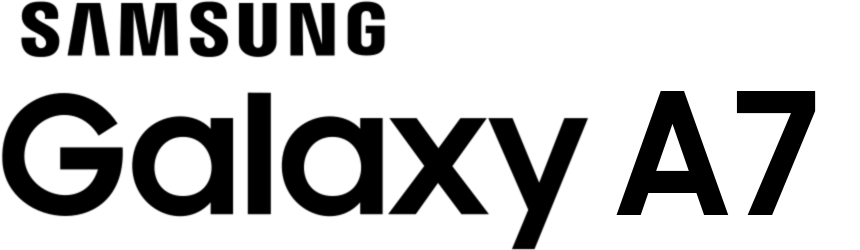

These are:

- Samsung Galaxy A7 (2015); Android smartphone released in February 2015.
- Samsung Galaxy A7 (2016); Android smartphone released in December 2015.
- Samsung Galaxy A7 (2017); Android smartphone released in January 2017.
- Samsung Galaxy A7 (2018); Android smartphone released in September 2018.

As a result of Samsung turning Samsung Galaxy J series into Samsung Galaxy A Series, the successor of Samsung Galaxy A7 (2018) is Samsung Galaxy A70.
