= Samsung Galaxy A5 =

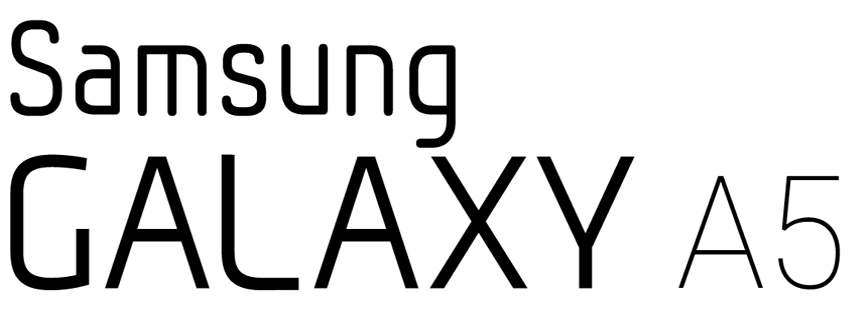
Samsung Galaxy A5 logo

Samsung Galaxy A5 refers to three Samsung Galaxy Android smartphones released in the 2010s.

These are:

- Samsung Galaxy A5 (2015); Android smartphone released in December 2014.
- Samsung Galaxy A5 (2016); Android smartphone released in December 2015.
- Samsung Galaxy A5 (2017); Android smartphone released in January 2017.
