= Samsung Galaxy E series =

Discontinued line of Android smartphones

- Developer: Samsung Electronics
- Product family: Samsung Galaxy
- Type: Smartphone
- Released: February 2015
- Discontinued: November 2016
- Operating system: Android
- System on a chip: Qualcomm Snapdragon
- Successor: Samsung Galaxy J series

The Samsung Galaxy E series is a discontinued line of low-end Android smartphones produced by Samsung Electronics, announced on January 6, 2015, and released in February 2015. After a few months, it stopped unveiling new Galaxy E series smartphones. In 2016, it has been merged with the Galaxy J series.

== Smartphones ==
The Galaxy E series market out of two smartphones:

Name	Dates		Discontinued	Support Status	Screen	Storage	RAM	OS	
Name	Announced	Released	Discontinued	Support Status	Screen	Storage	RAM	Initial	Latest
Galaxy E5	January 6, 2015	February 2015	November 30, 2016	Unsupported	5.0", 720 x 1280	16 GB	1.5 GB	Android 4.4.4	Android 5.1.1
Galaxy E7	January 6, 2015	February 2015	November 30, 2016	Unsupported	5.5", 720 x 1280	16 GB	2 GB	Android 4.4.4	Android 5.1.1

== Tablets ==
In 2014, Samsung released the Galaxy Tab E series in some countries, as it sold the Galaxy Tab 3 series. Later in 2015, the Galaxy Tab E series was released globally, including the Tab E 9.6. In 2017, Samsung merged the Galaxy Tab E series with the Tab A series, using the original models as the basis. From 2017 to 2019, Samsung sold the Galaxy Tab A 8.0 (2017) as the Galaxy Tab E 8.0 (2017) or the Galaxy Tab E 32GB in the USA.

Name	Dates		Support		OS		Memory		Display			Body	
Name	Announced	Released	Status	Ended	Initial	Latest	Storage	RAM	Type	Size	Resolution	Weight	Dimensions
Galaxy Tab E Lite 7.0 Galaxy Tab E 7.0; Galaxy Tab E7	2014 (as Galaxy Tab E7) April 2015 (as Galaxy Tab E 7.0) Late 2015 (as Galaxy Tab E Lite 7.0)		Unsupported	2015	Android 4.4.4 KitKat TouchWiz Nature UX 3.5		8 GB	1 GB	TFT	7.0 in	600 X 1024	0.68 lb	7.61 x 4.58 x 0.38 in
Galaxy Tab E 9.6	June 2015	July 2015	Unsupported	2015 (International version only)	Android 4.4.4 KitKat TouchWiz Nature UX 3.5		8 GB	1.5 GB	TFT	9.6 in	800 x 1280	1.08 lb	9.52 x 5.89 x 0.33 in
Galaxy Tab E 9.6	June 2015	July 2015	Unsupported	January 2017 (US version only)	Android 5.1.1 Lollipop TouchWiz Noble UX	Android 7.0 Nougat Samsung Experience 8.0	16GB	1.5 GB	TFT	9.6 in	800 x 1280	1.08 lb	9.52 x 5.89 x 0.33 in
Galaxy Tab E 8.0 (2016)	January 2016		Unsupported	September 2017	Android 5.1.1 Lollipop TouchWiz Noble UX	Android 7.1.1 Nougat Samsung Experience 8.5	16GB	1.5 GB	TFT	8.0 in	800 x 1280	12.70 oz	8.35 x 4.96 x 0.35 in
Galaxy Tab E 8.0 (2017) Galaxy Tab E 32GB	September 2017		Unsupported	2019	Android 7.1.1 Nougat Samsung Experience 8.5		32GB	2GB	IPS LCD	8.0 in	800 x 1280	0.79 lb	8.35 x 4.96 x 0.35 in

== Successor ==
The Galaxy E series was discontinued in November 2016 and merged with the Galaxy J series during the unveiling of the new Galaxy E series smartphone.
