= Samsung Galaxy A3 =

Samsung Galaxy A3 refers to three Samsung Galaxy Android smartphones released in the 2010s.

These are:

- Samsung Galaxy A3 (2015); Android smartphone unveiled in October 2014, released in December 2014.
- Samsung Galaxy A3 (2016); Android smartphone released in December 2015.
- Samsung Galaxy A3 (2017); Android smartphone released in January 2017.
