= Samsung Galaxy A8 =

Samsung Galaxy A8 refers to three Samsung Galaxy smartphones released in the 2010s.

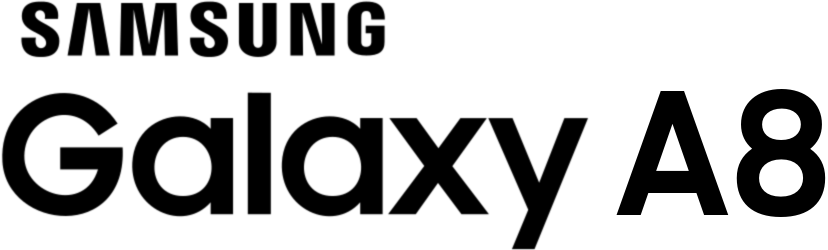

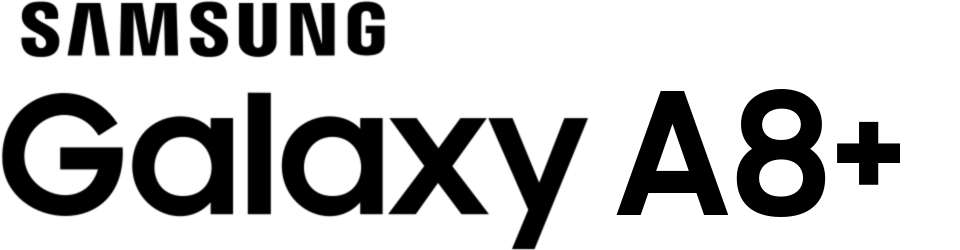

These are:

- Samsung Galaxy A8 (2015) edition; Android smartphone unveiled in July 2015, released in August 2015.
- Samsung Galaxy A8 (2016) edition; Android smartphone unveiled in September 2016, released in October 2016.
- Samsung Galaxy A8 (2018) edition; Android smartphone unveiled in December 2017, released in January 2018.
- Samsung Galaxy A8 Star, a variant of the 2018 Galaxy A8 specifically sold for the Southeast Asian market.
