= Samsung Galaxy A8 (2015) =

2015 mid-range smartphone by Samsung Electronics

Samsung Galaxy A8 (2015) Samsung Galaxy A8 Value Edition
- Brand: Samsung
- Manufacturer: Samsung Electronics
- Type: Phablet
- Series: Galaxy A
- Family: Samsung Galaxy
- First released: July 15, 2015; 11 years ago
- Availability by region: China: July 2015; Worldwide: August 2015; Japan: December 2015
- Discontinued: January 30, 2018; 8 years ago
- Predecessor: Samsung Galaxy Mega 2
- Successor: Samsung Galaxy A8 (2016); Samsung Galaxy A9 (2016); Samsung Galaxy A9 Pro (2016)
- Related: Samsung Galaxy A3 (2015); Samsung Galaxy A5 (2015); Samsung Galaxy A7 (2015)
- Compatible networks: 2G GSM & EDGE; 3G (UMTS/HSPA/CDMA/TD-SCDMA); 4G (FDD/TDD LTE)
- Form factor: Slate
- Dimensions: 158 mm (6.2 in) H 76.8 mm (3.02 in) W 5.9 mm (0.23 in) D
- Weight: 151 g (5.3 oz)
- Operating system: Original: Android 5.1.1 "Lollipop" with TouchWiz Zero UX; Current: Android 6.0 "Marshmallow" with TouchWiz Hero UX
- System-on-chip: Exynos 5430 (A800S, A800F); Exynos 5433 (A800I and A800J); Snapdragon 615 (A8000, A800Y/YZ)
- CPU: Quad-core 1.8 GHz Cortex-A53 + quad-core 1.3 GHz Cortex-A53 (A8000, A800Y/YZ); ARM Cortex-A15 MP4 1.8 GHz CPU + ARM Cortex-A7 MP4 1.3 GHz (A800F); ARM Cortex-A57 MP4 1.9 GHz CPU + ARM Cortex-A53 MP4 1.3 GHz CPU(A800I, A800J)
- GPU: Adreno 405 (A8000, A800Y/YZ); ARM Mali-T628 MP6 550 MHz (A800F, A800S); ARM Mali-T760 MP6 700 MHz (A800I, A800J)
- Memory: 2 GB LPDDR3 RAM
- Storage: 16 GB (A8000 only); 32 GB
- Removable storage: Up to 128 GB
- Battery: non-removable Li-Ion 3050 mAh
- Rear camera: 16 MP ISOCELL sensor
- Front camera: 5 MP sensor
- Display: 5.7 in (140 mm) 1920x1080 pixel (386 ppi) Full HD Super AMOLED; Gorilla Glass 4
- Connectivity: WLAN, Bluetooth 4.1, USB
- Model: A800F (Global); A800I (Global) (Note: Also known as Samsung Galaxy A8 VE (Value Edition)); A8000 (China and Hong Kong); A800Y/YZ (Taiwan); A800J (Japan)

The Samsung Galaxy A8 (stylized as Samsung GALAXY A8) is a mid-range Android-based phablet-sized smartphone manufactured, developed, designed and produced by Samsung Electronics. It was announced on July 15, 2015.

== Specifications ==
The Galaxy A8 is thinner than earlier models from the A-series line-up, measuring 5.9 millimetres (0.23 in) in thickness. The display is protected by Gorilla Glass 4.

Other specifications include a 5.7-inch 1080p (1080×1920) Super AMOLED display, a touch based fingerprint sensor integrated to the home button, 16 MP back camera and 5 MP front camera.

It is powered by Exynos 5430, Exynos 5433 or Snapdragon 615. All of these SoCs feature an octa-core processor, and they are backed by 2 GB RAM and 32 GB internal storage. There is a hybrid SIM slot that can also be used as a microSD card slot. It has a 3050 mAh non-removable battery.

It is shipped with Android 5.1.1 Lollipop and can been updated to Android 6.0 Marshmallow.

The Japan KDDI variant includes Oneseg & full Seg TV features, while the Korean SK Telecom Variant has a T-DMB feature.
