= Samsung Galaxy E5 =

Android smartphone

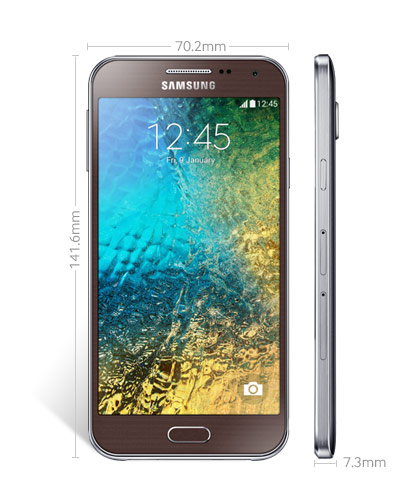
- Brand: Samsung Galaxy
- Manufacturer: Samsung Electronics
- Type: Touchscreen smartphone
- Series: E Series
- First released: January 2015
- Availability by region: 2015—2016
- Discontinued: November 2016
- Related: Samsung Galaxy E7; Samsung Galaxy A5
- Compatible networks: GSM/HSPA: 2G GSM; GSM 850 / 900 / 1800 / 1900: 3G HSPA; HSDPA 850 / 900 / 1900 / 2100
- Form factor: Slate
- Dimensions: 142.6 mm (5.57 in) H 70.2 mm (2.76 in) W 7.3mm (0.29 in) D
- Weight: 120 g (4.2 oz)
- Operating system: Original: Android 4.4.4 KitKat; Current: Android 5.1.1 Lollipop
- CPU: Quad-core 1.2 GHz Cortex-A53
- GPU: Adreno 306
- Memory: 1.5 GB LPDDR3 RAM
- Storage: 16 GB
- Removable storage: microSD up to 64 GB
- Battery: 2400 mAh Li-ion
- Rear camera: 8 MP, 3264 x 2448 pixels, autofocus, LED flash: Features = Geo-tagging, touch focus, face detection; Video = 1080p@30fps
- Front camera: 5 megapixels (1080p) HD video recording @ 30 fps back-illuminated sensor
- Display: 5 in (130 mm) 720p (294 ppi) Super AMOLED
- Connectivity: List: Wi-Fi; Wi-Fi Direct; Wi-Fi hotspot; DLNA; GPS/GLONASS; NFC; Bluetooth 4.0; USB 2.0 (Micro-B port, USB charging) USB OTG; 3.50 mm (0.138 in) headphone jack
- Model: SM-E500F; E500H; E500HQ; E500M; S978L Dual SIM models SM-E500F/DS; E500H/DS; E500M/DS
- Development status: Discontinued

The Samsung Galaxy E5 is an Android smartphone produced by Samsung Electronics. Released in January 2015, it has an 8-megapixel rear camera with an LED flash and a 5-megapixel front facing camera, and is equipped with a quad-core 1.2 GHz Snapdragon 410 CPU.

== Specifications ==
=== Hardware ===
The phone is powered with Qualcomm's Snapdragon 410 chipset which includes 1.2 GHz processor, Adreno 306 GPU and 1.5GB RAM, with 16GB of internal storage and an ample battery of 2400 mAh. The Samsung Galaxy E5 is fitted with a 5-inch HD Super AMOLED display and also includes an 8 MP rear camera and 5 MP front camera. Its dimensions are 141.6 x 70.2 x 7.3 mm (5.57 x 2.76 x 0.29 in).

=== Software ===
This phone was officially released with the Android 4.4.4 KitKat and was upgraded to Android 5.1.1 Lollipop on August 2, 2015. External memory is supported up to 64GB.

=== Camera ===
There are two cameras on the phone, a primary and secondary: the primary one comprises 8 MP, 3264 x 2448 pixels, auto-focus, LED flash with Geo-tagging, touch focus, face detection, panorama. The video is 1080p@30fps. The secondary camera is a front-facing 5 MP.
