= Samsung Galaxy A5 (2015) =

2014 mid-range smartphone by Samsung Electronics

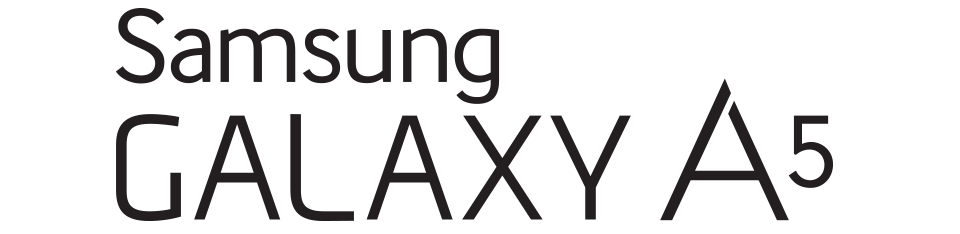

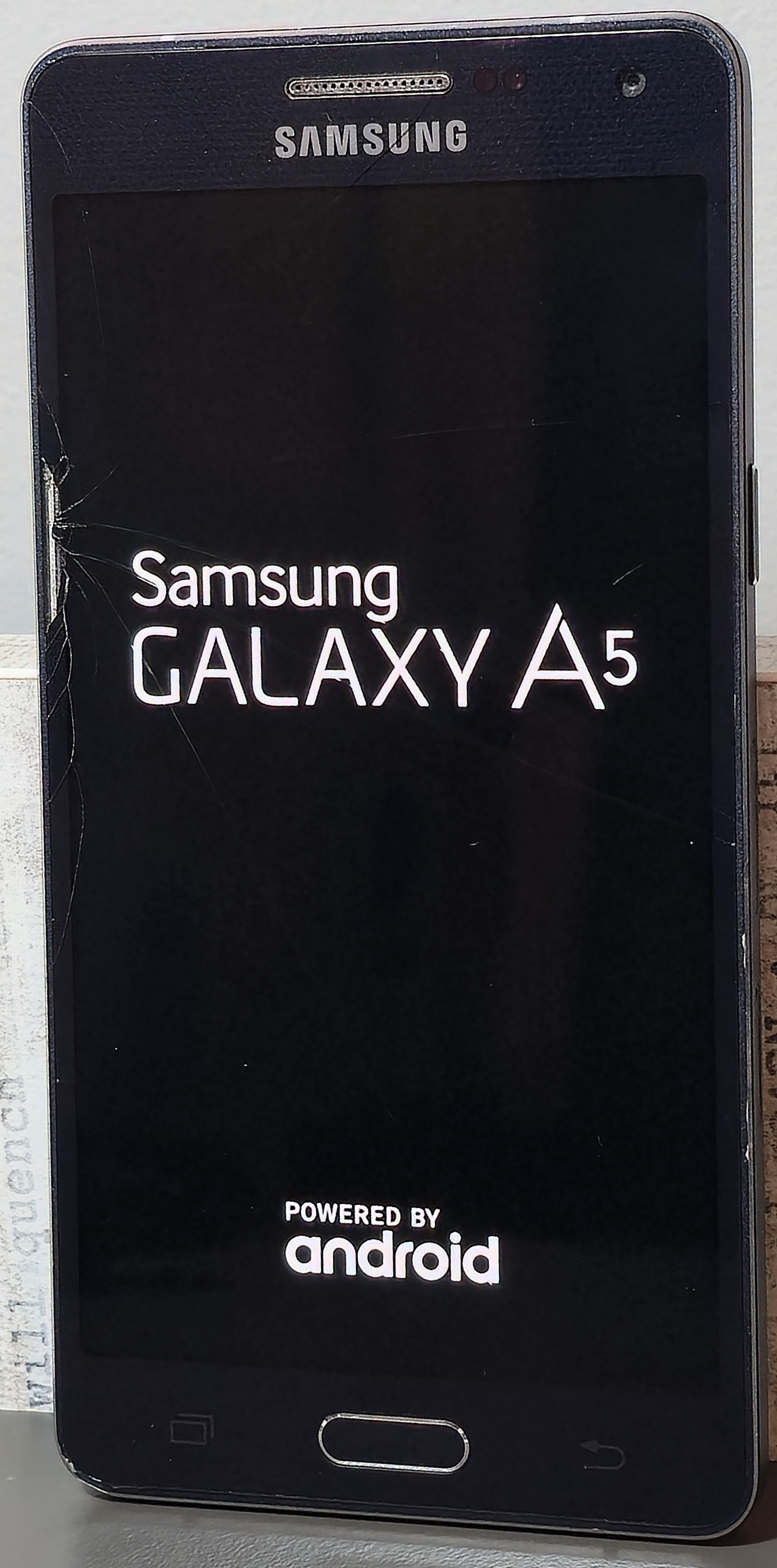
- Samsung Galaxy A5 in black
- Brand: Samsung
- Manufacturer: Samsung Electronics
- Type: Smartphone
- Series: Galaxy A
- Family: Samsung Galaxy
- First released: December 2014; 11 years ago
- Availability by region: December 2014; 11 years ago
- Predecessor: Samsung Galaxy Alpha
- Successor: Samsung Galaxy A5 (2016)
- Related: Samsung Galaxy S5; Samsung Galaxy K Zoom; Samsung Galaxy S5 Mini; Samsung Galaxy Alpha; Samsung Galaxy Note 4 Samsung Galaxy Note Edge; Samsung Galaxy A3 (2015); Samsung Galaxy A7 (2015); Samsung Galaxy E5; Samsung Galaxy A8 (2015)
- Compatible networks: 2G, 3G, 4G
- Form factor: Slate
- Dimensions: 5.48 in (139 mm) H 2.74 in (70 mm) W 0.26 in (6.6 mm) D
- Weight: 123 g (4 oz)
- Operating system: Original: Android 4.4.4 "KitKat" with TouchWiz Nature UX 3.5; Current: Android 6.0.1 "Marshmallow" with TouchWiz Nature UX 4.5
- System-on-chip: Qualcomm Snapdragon 410 MSM8916
- CPU: Quad Core 1.2 GHz 64-bit CPU
- GPU: Adreno 306
- Memory: 2 GB RAM
- Storage: 16 GB
- Removable storage: up to 64 GB
- Battery: 2300 mAh (non-removable)
- Rear camera: 13 MP, 1080p@30fps
- Front camera: 5 MP
- Display: 5.0" Super AMOLED HD display with Corning Gorilla Glass 4, 720×1280 px
- Connectivity: 802.11 a/b/g/n, Wi-Fi hotspot; Bluetooth v4.0, A2DP; USB 2.0 via microUSB
- Data inputs: Multi-touch touchscreen
- Model: SM-A500x (Last letter varies by carrier & international models)

The Samsung Galaxy A5 (2015) or Samsung Galaxy A5 2015 Edition is an Android-based smartphone manufactured, developed and produced by Samsung Electronics. Serving as a premium upper mid-range device, it was introduced on October 30, 2014, alongside the smaller Samsung Galaxy A3 (2015) and larger Samsung Galaxy A7 (2015) introduced later in January 2015. The Samsung Galaxy A5 (2016) is a successor to the Samsung Galaxy A5 (2015) edition, featuring a revised metal and glass build that debuted with the Galaxy S6.

The Samsung Galaxy A5 is preinstalled with Android 4.4.2 KitKat but can be upgraded to Android 6.0.1 Marshmallow.

== Hardware ==
Samsung Galaxy A5's system-on chip is Qualcomm Snapdragon 410, which is a 64-bit 1.2 GHz ARM Cortex-A53 processor. The graphic processor of the phone is Adreno 306. The smartphone has 2 GB RAM and 16 GB internal storage, with support for removable MicroSD cards of up to 64 GB. The device's MicroSD card slot has been designed to allow insertion of a SIM card, and thus the A5 can also be used in Dual SIM mode.

== Design ==
The Samsung Galaxy A5 shifts away from the plastic design of previous phones, featuring an aluminium unibody with chamfered metal edges. While its design is almost similar to the earlier Samsung Galaxy Alpha and Samsung Galaxy Note 4, the A5 has a larger 5-inch Super AMOLED HD display compared to the 4.7-inch display of Galaxy Alpha, as well as being slimmer at 6.7 mm, becoming the thinnest Samsung smartphone at the time of release. The A5's display features screen protection, utilizing the newer Gorilla Glass 4. The phone carries over the 13-megapixel rear camera sensor from the successful Galaxy S4, with software tweaks for sharper detail and better low-light capability. The front of the device features a new 5-megapixel camera for better detail capture, with the phone marketed towards a 'selfie' oriented younger audience.

== Software ==
The device runs on Google's 4.4.4 "KitKat" Android operating system out of the box, featuring the improved TouchWiz Nature UX 3.5 as well as introducing a theme suite, later made standard on newer devices. The Note 4, Note Edge, and the Galaxy A series were the only devices to ship with this interface on Android 4.4.4. The Galaxy A5 would later receive Android 5.0.2 "Lollipop" in May 2015. Android 6.0.1 Marshmallow for the Galaxy A series was announced in July 2016 and the devices are currently receiving the newer operating system. The OTA update also brings a slightly updated TouchWiz UI that remains largely similar to the nature UX 3.5 and 4.0 user interfaces from the Note 4 and Galaxy S5, but features newer 'squircle' icons introduced in the Note 5. This is considered to be the last major Android update for the phone, following Google and Samsung's 2-year software support policy.
