= Samsung Galaxy A9 Pro (2016) =

2016 Android smartphone

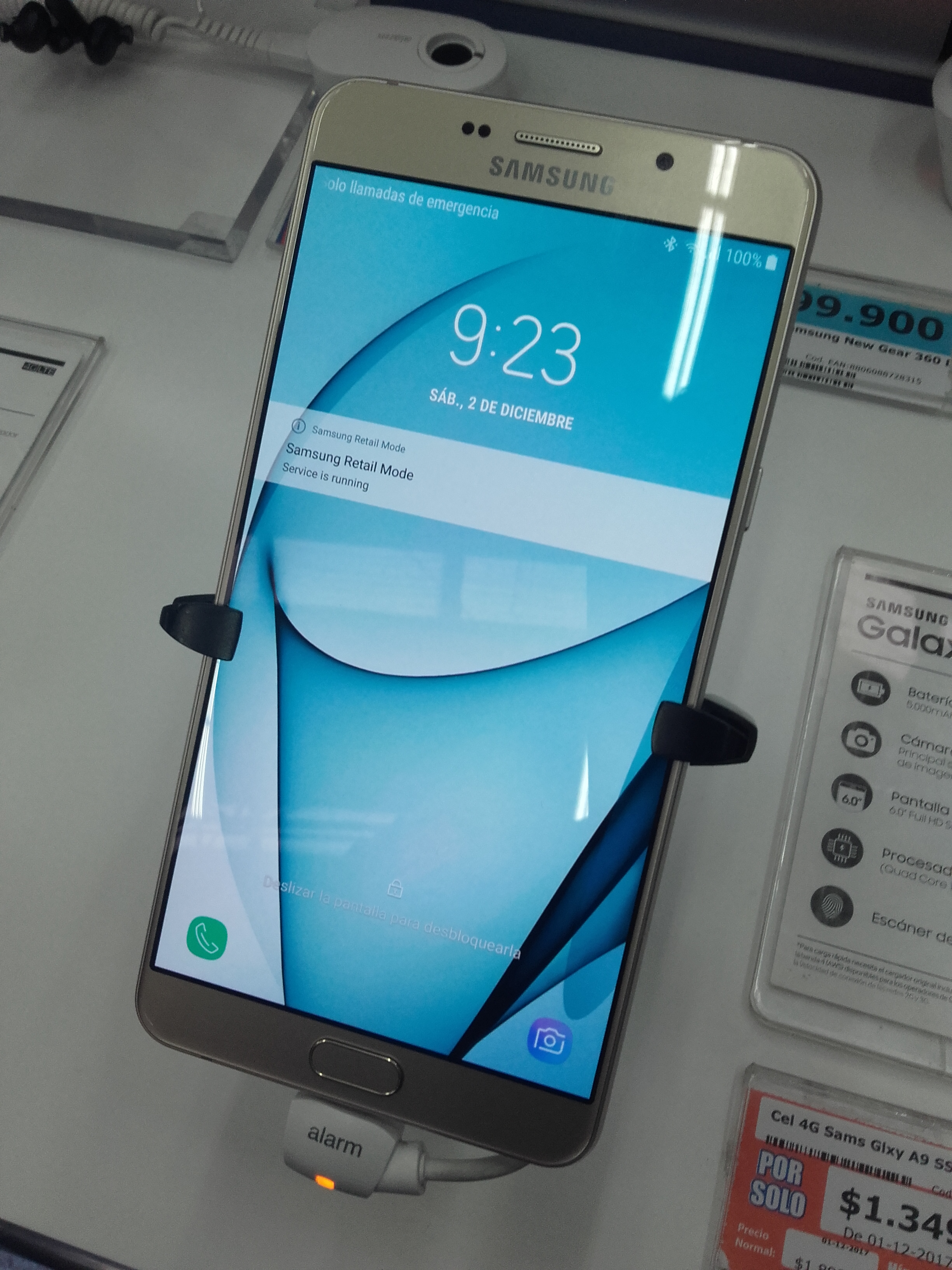
- Samsung Galaxy A9 Pro smartphone
- Brand: Samsung Galaxy
- Manufacturer: Samsung Electronics
- Type: Phablet
- Series: Galaxy A series
- First released: March 30, 2016
- Availability by region: May 2016
- Discontinued: 2018
- Successor: Samsung Galaxy A9 Pro (2019)
- Related: Samsung Galaxy A3 (2016); Samsung Galaxy A5 (2016); Samsung Galaxy A7 (2016); Samsung Galaxy A9 (2016)
- Compatible networks: 2G, 3G (UMTS/HSPA), 4G
- Form factor: Slate
- Dimensions: 161.7 × 80.9 × 7.9 mm
- Weight: 210 g (7 oz)
- Operating system: Original: Android 6.0.1 "Marshmallow" With TouchWiz; Current: Android 8.0.0 "Oreo" With Samsung Experience 9.0
- System-on-chip: 64-bit Qualcomm Snapdragon 652
- CPU: Quad-Core 1.8 GHz ARM Cortex-A72 + Quad-Core 1.4 GHz ARM Cortex-A53
- GPU: Adreno 510
- Memory: 4 GB RAM (LPDDR3)
- Storage: 32 GB (eMMC 5.1)
- Removable storage: microSDXC, expandable up to 256 GB
- Battery: 5000 mAh (non-removable) with fast-charging
- Rear camera: Single-Camera Setup; Sony Exmor RS IMX 298; 16 MP, f/1.9, 25mm, FoV 74.1°, 1/2.8", 1.12μm, AF, OIS; Features: LED flash, panorama, HDR; Video: 1080p@30fps
- Front camera: Samsung ISOCELL S5K4H5; 8 MP, f/1.9, 24mm, FoV 83.7°, 1/4.0", 1.12μm; Video: 1080p@30fps
- Display: 6.0" Super AMOLED FHD display with Corning Gorilla Glass 4, 1080×1920px
- Connectivity: 802.11 a/b/g/n/ac, Wi-Fi hotspot; Bluetooth v4.2, A2DP; USB 2.0 via microUSB
- Data inputs: List: Multi-touch capacitive touchscreen; Fingerprint sensor; 3 push buttons; aGPS; GLONASS; Accelerometer; Digital compass
- Model: SM-A910x (Last letter varies by carrier & international models)

The Samsung Galaxy A9 Pro (2016) (stylized as SAMSUNG Galaxy A9 Pro_{6}) is an Android phablet smartphone produced by Samsung Electronics. It was released in March 2016.

The Samsung Galaxy A9 Pro (2016) runs Android 6.0 "Marshmallow" and can be upgraded to Android 8.0 "Oreo". The difference between the Samsung Galaxy A9 (2016) and the Pro version is that the A9 (2016) has 3 GB of RAM and a 4000mAh battery while A9 Pro (2016) has 4 GB of RAM and a 5000mAh battery. Also, A9 Pro is equipped with a 16 MP rear camera while the A9 (2016) has a 13 MP rear camera.

== Specifications ==
=== Design ===
The Samsung Galaxy A9 Pro (2016) has glass rear panel and aluminium frame. Both of the front glass and rear panel are protected by Corning Gorilla Glass 4. It measures 161.7 x 80.9 x 7.9 mm (Height x Width x Thickness) and weighs 210 grams. It was available with black, white and gold color options.

=== Hardware ===
The device is powered by Qualcomm Snapdragon 652 with a octa-core processor with 28 nm fabrication process and 4x 1.8 GHz Cortex-A72 + 4x 1.4 GHz Cortex-A53 cores and Adreno 510 GPU. The device has 4 GB RAM, 32 GB eMMC 5.1 internal storage that can be expanded by microSDXC card slot, 16 MP rear camera with f/1.9 aperture, 8 MP selfie camera with f/1.9 aperture, 6.0 inch Super AMOLED Full HD (1080x1920 pixels) display and 5000 mAh non-removable Li-Ion battery.

==== Camera ====
The device has a 16 MP rear camera with f/1.9 aperture, 1/2.8" sensor size, autofocus (AF) and optical image stabilization (OIS). It has an 8 MP selfie camera with f/1.9 aperture. Both of the cameras support 1080p video recording at 30 fps.

=== Software ===
The device comes with Android 6.0.1 Marshmallow preinstalled. It received Android 7.0 Nougat update in 2017. It is upgradable to Android 8.0 Oreo with the Samsung Experience 9.0 user interface.
