= Samsung Galaxy Feel =

2017 Japanese smartphone from Samsung

- Brand: Samsung Galaxy
- Manufacturer: Samsung Electronics
- Type: Touchscreen Smartphone
- First released: May 2017
- Availability by region: Japan: June 2017
- Successor: Samsung Galaxy Feel 2
- Related: Samsung Galaxy A3 (2016)
- Dimensions: 138×67×8.3 mm (5.43×2.64×0.33 in)
- Weight: 149 g (5 oz)
- Operating system: Original: Android 7.0 (Nougat) with Samsung Experience 8.1; Current: Android 8.0 (Oreo) with Samsung Experience 9.0
- System-on-chip: Samsung Exynos 7870
- CPU: 1.6GHz Octa-Core ARM Cortex-A53
- GPU: ARM Mali-T830 MP1 700MHz
- Memory: 3GB RAM
- Storage: 32GB
- Removable storage: microSD, up to 256GB
- Battery: Li-Ion 3000 mAh
- Rear camera: 16 MP
- Front camera: 5 MP
- Display: 4.7 in (120 mm) Super AMOLED HD display with Corning Gorilla Glass 4, 720×1280 px, 312 ppi
- Connectivity: 802.11 a/b/g/n/ac Bluetooth 4.2; USB 2.0 via microUSB
- Model: SC-04J (NTT Docomo)

The Samsung Galaxy Feel (Japanese: ギャラクシーフィール) is an Android-based smartphone developed by Samsung Electronics exclusively for the Japanese market. The phone was released in June 2017 and was sold by NTT Docomo. It runs on Android 7.0 (Nougat), has a 4.7-inch display, and a 3000 mAh battery.

== Specifications ==
=== Software ===
Samsung Galaxy Feel runs on Android 7.0 (Nougat), but can be later updated to Android 8.0 (Oreo).

=== Hardware ===
Samsung Galaxy Feel has a 4.7-inch Super AMOLED HD display, 16 MP back-facing and 5 MP front-facing cameras. It has a 3000 mAh battery, a 1.6 GHz Octa-Core ARM Cortex-A53 CPU, and an ARM Mali-T830 MP1 700 MHz GPU. It comes with 32 GB of internal storage, expandable to 256 GB via microSD.

Aside from its software and hardware specifications, Samsung also introduced a unique a hole in the phone's shell to accommodate the Japanese perceived penchant for personalizing their mobile phones. The Galaxy Feel's battery was also touted as a major selling point since the market favors handsets with longer battery life. The device is also waterproof and supports 1seg digital broadcasts using an antenna that is sold separately.

== History ==
Samsung Galaxy Feel was announced May 2017 and released June of the same year.
