= Samsung Galaxy E7 =

Android smartphone

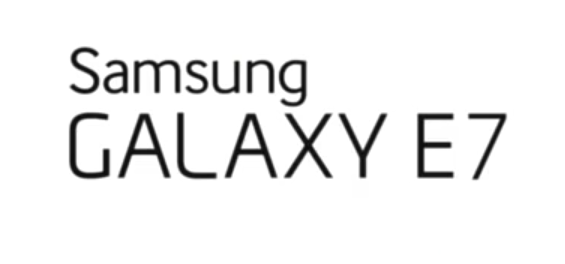
- Brand: Samsung Galaxy
- Manufacturer: Samsung Electronics
- Series: E-series
- First released: February 2015
- Availability by region: 2015-2016
- Discontinued: November 2016
- Related: Samsung Galaxy A7; Samsung Galaxy E5
- Compatible networks: 2G; 3G (UMTS/HSPA); 4G (LTE)
- Form factor: Phablet
- Dimensions: 151.3 mm (5.96 in) H 77.2 mm (3.04 in) W 7.3 mm (0.29 in) D
- Weight: 141 g (4.97 oz)
- Operating system: Original: Android 4.4.4 KitKat Current: Android 5.1.1 Lollipop
- System-on-chip: Qualcomm Snapdragon 410 (64-bit)
- CPU: Quad-core 1.2 GHz; Cortex-A53
- GPU: Adreno 306
- Memory: 2 GB RAM
- Storage: 16 GB
- Removable storage: up to 64 GB
- Battery: Li-Ion 2950 mAh
- Rear camera: 13 MP
- Front camera: 5 MP
- Display: 5.5 in (140 mm) 720 x 1280 pixel HD Super AMOLED
- Connectivity: Micro USB 2.0, Bluetooth 4.0, Wi-Fi b/g/n, Wi-Fi Direct, GPS location, NFC (LTE model only)
- Model: SM-E7000/E700F/E700H
- Development status: Discontinued

The Samsung Galaxy E7 is a midrange Android smartphone produced by Samsung Electronics. It was released in January 2015 and discontinued in November 2016. Samsung Galaxy E7 has a 13-megapixel rear camera with LED flash and a 5-megapixel front-facing camera.

== Specifications ==
=== Hardware ===
The phone is powered by Qualcomm's Snapdragon 410 chipset, which includes a 1.2 GHz processor, Adreno 306 GPU and 2 GB RAM, with 16 GB of internal storage. It also has a lithium-ion battery with a capacity of 2950 mAh. The Samsung Galaxy E7 has a 5.5-inch HD Super AMOLED display and also includes a 13 MP rear camera and 5 MP front camera. It comes with two nano-SIM slots, with one of them also serving as a microSD slot.

=== Software ===
This phone was officially released with Android 4.4.4 "KitKat". It is also upgradable to Android 5.1.1 "Lollipop".
