= Samsung Galaxy A3 (2015) =

2014 low-range smartphone by Samsung Electronics

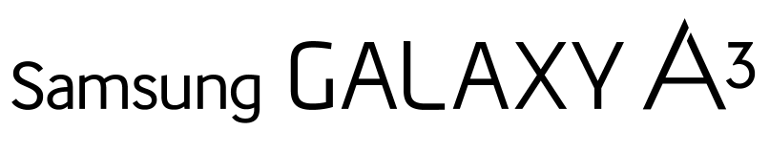

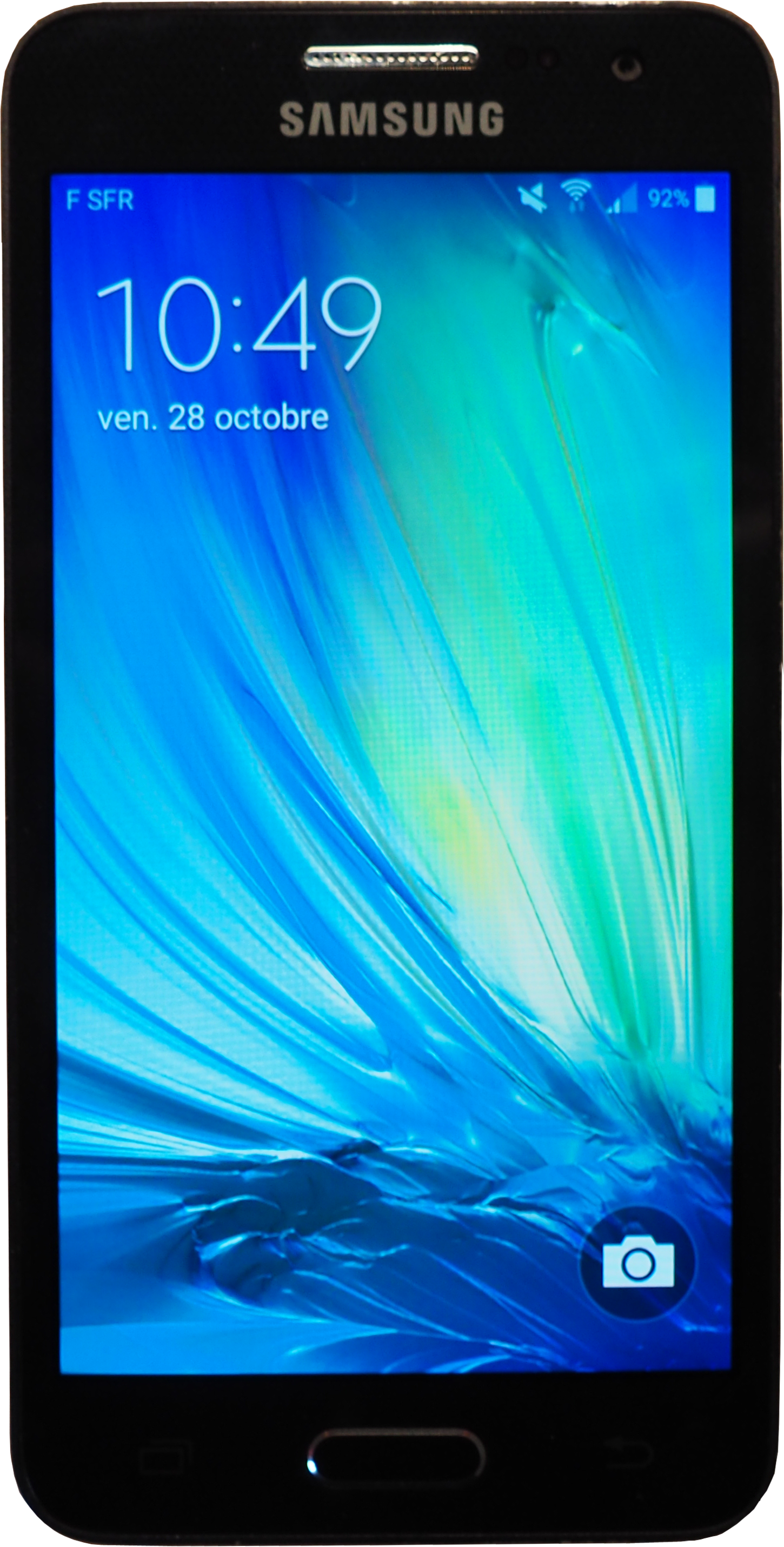
- Samsung Galaxy A3 in black
- Brand: Samsung
- Manufacturer: Samsung Electronics
- Type: Smartphone
- Series: Galaxy A
- Family: Samsung Galaxy
- First released: December 2014; 11 years ago
- Availability by region: December 2014; 11 years ago
- Discontinued: 2015; 11 years ago
- Predecessor: Samsung Galaxy Alpha
- Successor: Samsung Galaxy A3 (2016)
- Related: Samsung Galaxy S5; Samsung Galaxy K Zoom; Samsung Galaxy S5 Mini; Samsung Galaxy Note 4 Samsung Galaxy Note Edge; Samsung Galaxy A5 (2015); Samsung Galaxy A7 (2015); Samsung Galaxy A8 (2015)
- Compatible networks: 2G / 3G+ (UMTS/HSPA+) / 4G (LTE)
- Form factor: Slate
- Dimensions: 130.1 mm (5.12 in) H 65.5 mm (2.58 in) W 6.9 mm (0.27 in)
- Weight: 110.3 g (3.89 oz)
- Operating system: Original: Android 4.4.4 "KitKat" with TouchWiz Nature UX 3.5; Current: Android 6.0.1 "Marshmallow" with TouchWiz Nature UX 4.5 (SM-A300FU only)
- System-on-chip: Qualcomm Snapdragon 410 MSM8916/MSM8216 *regional models only*
- CPU: 1.2 GHz quad-core 64-bit CPU
- GPU: Adreno 306
- Memory: 1 GB RAM (SM-A300F and A300H); 1.5 GB RAM (SM-A300FU)
- Storage: 16 GB
- Removable storage: up to 64 GB
- Battery: 1900 mAh (non-removable)
- Rear camera: 8MP
- Front camera: 5MP
- Display: 4.5' qHD 540x960 Super AMOLED
- Connectivity: WLAN: Wi-Fi 802.11 b/g/n, Wi-Fi hotspot, Bluetooth: v4.0, A2DP, USB: microUSB v2.0
- Model: SM-A300x (Last letter varies by carrier & international models)

The Samsung Galaxy A3 (2015) or Samsung Galaxy A3 2015 Edition is a lower mid-range Android-based aluminum smartphone manufactured, developed and designed by Samsung Electronics. It was introduced in October 2014, alongside the larger mid-range Samsung Galaxy A5. Samsung Galaxy A3 (2016) is a successor to Samsung Galaxy A3.

Samsung Galaxy A3 model SM-A300FU currently runs Android 6.0.1 Marshmallow, however all other models can only be upgraded to Android 5.0.2 Lollipop.

== Specifications ==
- Rear Camera: 8 MP
- Front Camera: 5 MP
- System-on Chip: Qualcomm Snapdragon 410 (Quad-core 1.2 GHz, ARM Cortex-A53 64-bit CPU)
- Graphics Processor: Adreno 306
- Memory: 1 GB RAM (A300F), 1.5 GB RAM (SM-A300FU)
- Storage: 16 GB
- Battery: 1900 mAh (non-removable)
- Size: 4.5 in
- Resolution: 540 x 960 pixels (qHD), 245 ppi
- Operating System: Android 4.4.4 KitKat (upgradable to Android 6.0.1 Marshmallow)
- Weight: 110 g
- Dimensions: 130.1 x 65.5 x 6.9 mm
- Super AMOLED Display
- Gorilla Glass 4

=== Models ===
The phone was introduced in a sequence of models, with different features:

Model	Network	RAM	SIM	Android version	Information
SM-A300H	3G+ HSPA+	1 GB	Single	Android 4.4.4 KitKat	Weaker communication abilities of 3G+ HSPA+ (42 Mbit/s)
SM-A300H/DS	3G+ HSPA+ Duos	1 GB	Dual	Android 4.4.4 KitKat	Weaker communication abilities of 3G+ HSPA+ (42 Mbit/s)
SM-A300M/DS	4G-LTE Duos	1 GB	Dual	Android 4.4.4 KitKat	Newer communication abilities of 4G LTE (150 Mbit/s)
SM-A300F	4G-LTE	1 GB	Dual	Android 5.0.2 Lollipop	Newer communication abilities of 4G LTE (150 Mbit/s)
SM-A300FU	4G-LTE	1.5 GB	Single	Android 6.0.1 Marshmallow	Newer communication abilities of 4G LTE (150 Mbit/s) - available only in Europe and South Africa

So, the most significant differences are between the models A300H/DS, compared to A300FU.
