= Samsung Galaxy A7 (2016) =

2015 Android smartphone

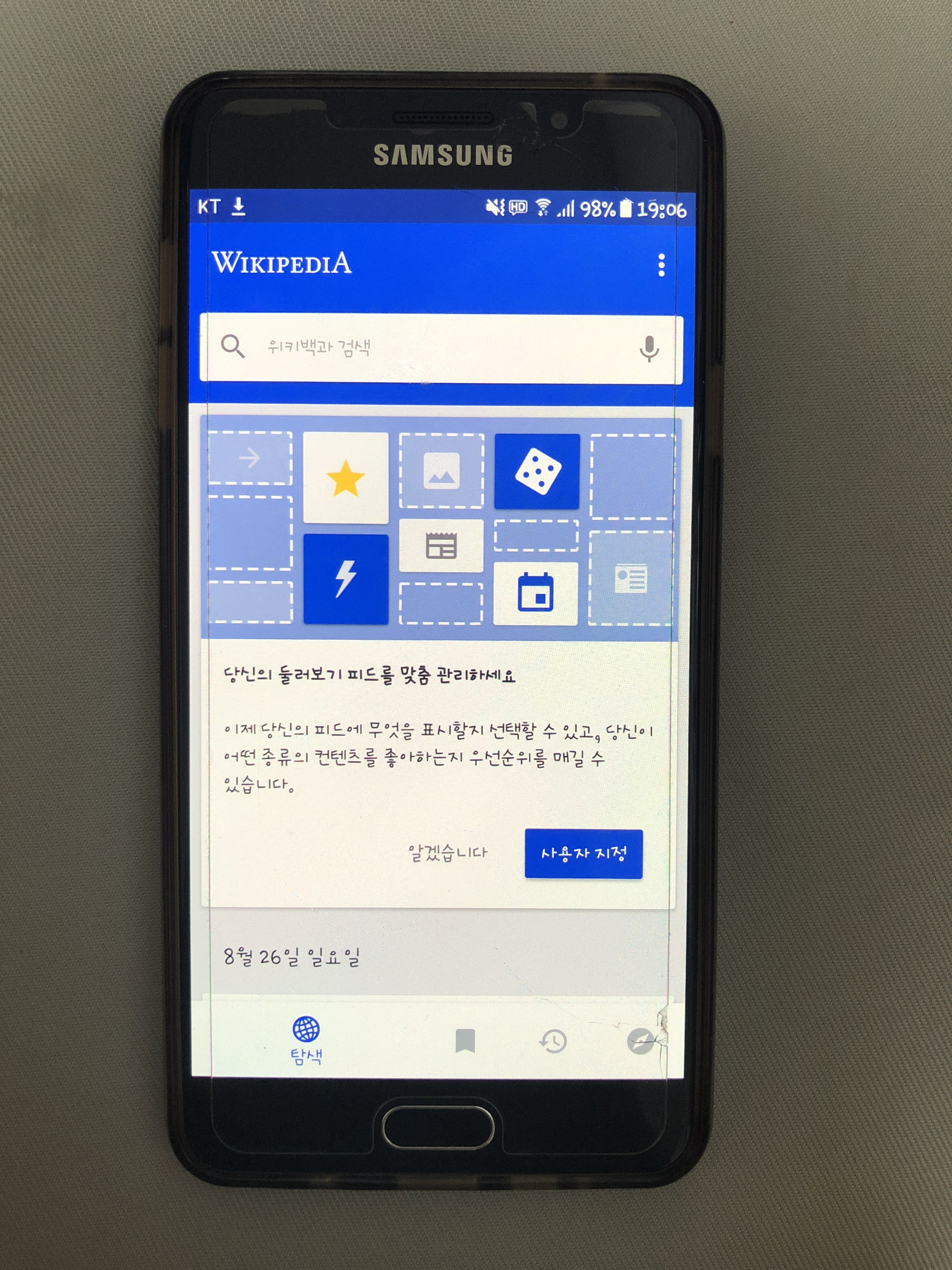
- Brand: Samsung Galaxy
- Manufacturer: Samsung Electronics
- Type: Touchscreen smartphone
- Series: Galaxy A series
- First released: December 2, 2015; 10 years ago
- Predecessor: Samsung Galaxy A7 (2015)
- Successor: Samsung Galaxy A7 (2017)
- Related: Samsung Galaxy A3 (2016); Samsung Galaxy A5 (2016); Samsung Galaxy A9 (2016)
- Compatible networks: 2G, 3G (UMTS/HSPA), 4G (LTE)
- Form factor: Slate
- Dimensions: 144.8 × 71 × 7.3 mm
- Weight: 169 g (6 oz)
- Operating system: Original: Android 5.1.1 "Lollipop" with TouchWiz; Current: Android 7.1.1 "Nougat" With Samsung Experience 8.5
- System-on-chip: World: Samsung Exynos 7 Octa 7580; China: Qualcomm Snapdragon 615
- CPU: Octa-Core 1.6 GHz
- GPU: Mali-T720MP2 / Adreno 405
- Memory: 3 GB RAM
- Storage: 16 GB
- Removable storage: up to 128 GB
- Battery: 3300mAh (non-removable) with fast-charging
- Rear camera: 13 MP
- Front camera: 5 MP
- Display: 5.5" Super AMOLED FHD display with Corning Gorilla Glass 4, 1080×1920 px
- Connectivity: 802.11 a/b/g/n, Wi-Fi hotspot; Bluetooth v4.1, A2DP; USB 2.0 via microUSB
- Data inputs: List: Multi-touch capacitive touchscreen; Fingerprint sensor; 3 push buttons; aGPS; GLONASS; Accelerometer; Digital compass
- Model: SM-A710x (Last letter varies by carrier & international models)

The Samsung Galaxy A7 (2016) or Samsung Galaxy A7 2016 Edition is an Android-based smartphone produced by Samsung Electronics. It was introduced on December 2, 2015, along with Samsung Galaxy A3 (2016), Samsung Galaxy A5 (2016), and Samsung Galaxy A9 (2016)

The Samsung Galaxy A7 (2016) runs Android 5.1.1 Lollipop right out-of-the-box and is upgradeable to Android 6.0.1 Marshmallow and Android 7.1.1 Nougat. The smartphone features Exynos 7580 SoC consisting of an octa-core 1.6 GHz ARM Cortex-A53 processor and a Mali T720-MP2 GPU and supports up to 3 GB of RAM and 16 GB of internal storage, which is expandable up to 128 GB via a MicroSD slot which can also be used for a second Nano-SIM. In China, it was released with Snapdragon 615. The device retains a non-removable battery like its predecessor, rated at 3300 mAh.

The Samsung Galaxy A7 (2017) was the successor of the Samsung Galaxy A7 (2016).

== Availability ==
The Samsung Galaxy A7 (2016) was released in China on December 15, 2015, followed by other countries in the Q1 2016. As of April 2016, the Samsung Galaxy A7 (2016) is now available in Eastern Europe (only Russia, Ukraine and Turkey), Africa, Middle East, Latin America and Asia. It is not available in North America and the rest of Europe.

While its predecessor Samsung Galaxy A7 (2015) had broader availability in Europe, this model was never sold in Europe because it was deemed too expensive and also near-direct competitor against Samsung Galaxy S6.

== Variants ==
Model	Processor	SIM	Region
SM-A710F	Samsung Exynos 7 Octa 7580	Single	Turkey, Israel and South Africa
SM-A710F/DS	Samsung Exynos 7 Octa 7580	Dual	Russia, Kazakhstan, Ukraine and Caucasus countries (Armenia, Azerbaijan, Georgia)
SM-A710FD	Samsung Exynos 7 Octa 7580	Dual	Middle East, Africa, Asia
SM-A710Y	Samsung Exynos 7 Octa 7580	Single	Australia and New Zealand
SM-A710Y/DS	Samsung Exynos 7 Octa 7580	Dual	Philippines and Taiwan
SM-A710M	Samsung Exynos 7 Octa 7580	Single	Latin America
SM-A710M/DS	Samsung Exynos 7 Octa 7580	Dual	Brazil
SM-A7100	Qualcomm Snapdragon 615	Single	China and Hong Kong
SM-A710S	Samsung Exynos 7 Octa 7580	Single	South Korea (SK Telecom)
SM-A710K	Samsung Exynos 7 Octa 7580	Single	South Korea (KT Corporation)
