= Samsung Galaxy A5 (2016) =

Samsung Smartphone

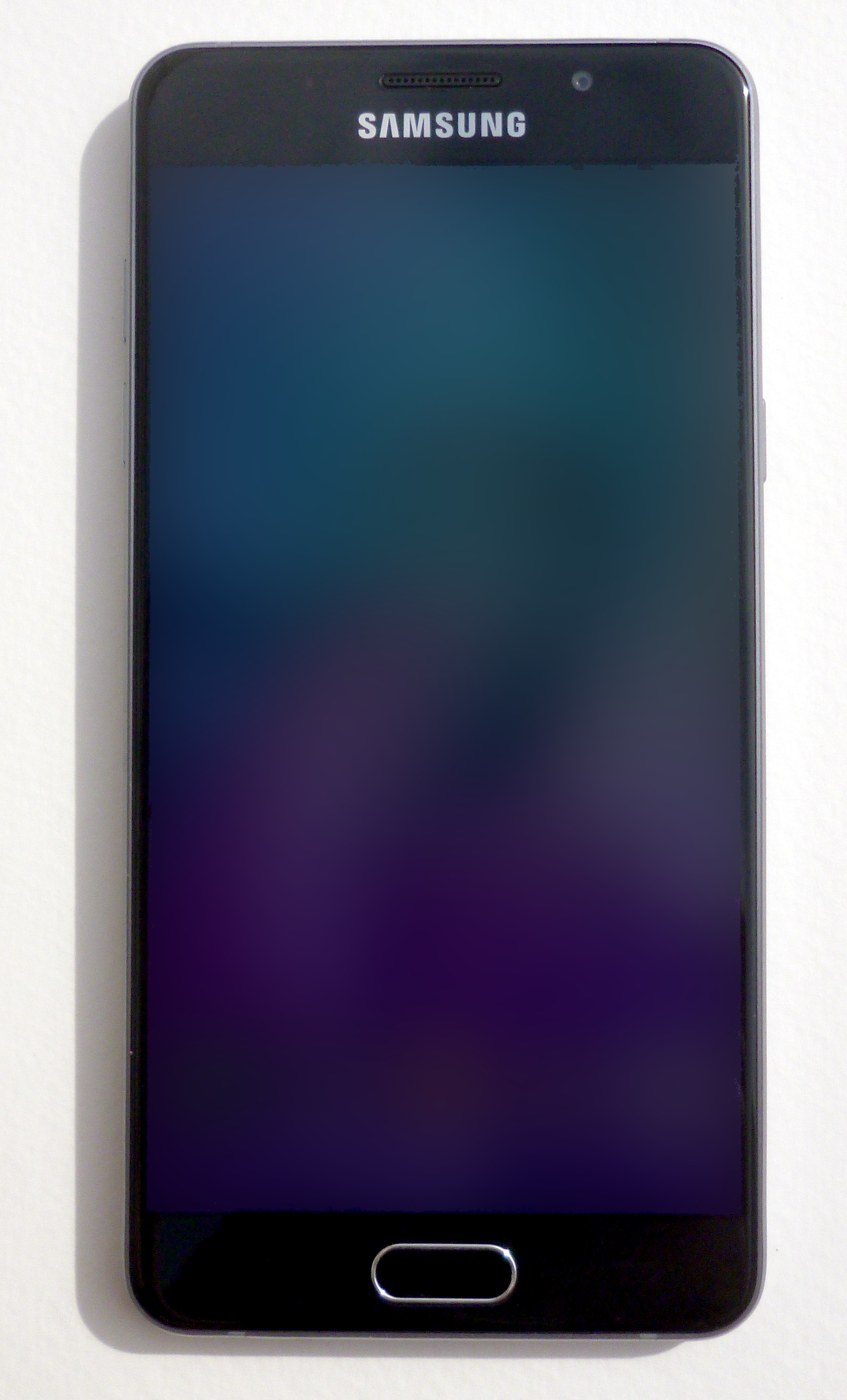
- Samsung Galaxy A5 (2016)
- Brand: Samsung Galaxy
- Manufacturer: Samsung Electronics
- Type: Touchscreen smartphone
- Series: Galaxy A series
- First released: 2 December 2015; 10 years ago
- Predecessor: Samsung Galaxy A5 (2015)
- Successor: Samsung Galaxy A5 (2017)
- Related: Samsung Galaxy A3 (2016); Samsung Galaxy A7 (2016); Samsung Galaxy A8 (2016); Samsung Galaxy A9 (2016)
- Compatible networks: 2G, 3G (UMTS/HSPA), 4G (LTE)
- Form factor: Slate
- Dimensions: 144.8 × 71 × 7.3 mm
- Weight: 155 g (5 oz)
- Operating system: Original: Android 5.1.1 "Lollipop" with TouchWiz Noble UX; Current: Android 7.1.1 "Nougat" with Samsung Experience 8.5
- System-on-chip: Samsung Exynos 7 Octa 7580 64-bit
- CPU: Octa-core 1.6 GHz Cortex-A53
- GPU: Mali-T720MP2
- Memory: 2 GB RAM
- Storage: 16 GB
- Removable storage: Up to 128 GB
- Battery: 2900 mAh (non-removable) with fast-charging
- Rear camera: 13 MP, f/1.9, 28 mm, OIS, autofocus, LED flash, 1080p@30fps
- Front camera: 5 MP, f/1.9, 24 mm, 1080p
- Display: 5.2" (132mm) Super AMOLED FHD display with Corning Gorilla Glass 4, 1080×1920 px, 2.5D, Colour depth 16M, 424 ppi
- Connectivity: 802.11 a/b/g/n, Wi-Fi hotspot; Bluetooth v4.1, A2DP, EDR, LE; USB 2.0 microUSB
- Data inputs: List: Multi-touch capacitive touchscreen; Fingerprint sensor; 3 push buttons; aGPS; GLONASS; Accelerometer; No Gyroscope sensor; Digital compass
- Model: SM-A510x (Last letter varies by carrier & international models)

Samsung's Galaxy A5 (2016) or Samsung Galaxy A5 2016 Edition is an Android smartphone developed by Samsung. It is the successor of the Samsung Galaxy A5 (2015), and it was released in China on 15 December 2015. As of April 2016, the Samsung Galaxy A5 (2016) is available in Europe, Africa, Latin America and Asia.

== Hardware ==
Samsung Galaxy A5 (2016) is powered by the Exynos 7580 (Exynos 7 Octa) SoC with a 1.6 GHz octa-core 64-bit processor and Mali T720-MP2 graphics processor. The smartphone has 2 GB RAM and 16 GB eMMC internal storage with support for removable MicroSD cards of up to 128 GB. The device's MicroSD card allows the insertion of a SIM card, thus it can also be used in Dual SIM mode.

=== Extended hardware details ===
==== Display ====
- Technology: Super AMOLED
- Size: 5.2 inches (132 mm)
- Resolution: 1080 × 1920 (Full HD)
- Color depth: 16M
- Pixel density: 424 PPI
- S Pen support: No

==== Memory ====
- RAM: 2 GB
- ROM: 16 GB
- External memory support (microSD slot): Up to 128 GB

==== Sensors ====
- Accelerometer, geomagnetic sensor, Hall sensor, proximity sensor, RGB light sensor

==== Audio and video ====
- Video recording resolution: FHD (1920 × 1080 pixels) 30 fps
- Video playing formats: MP4, M4V, 3GP, 3G2, WMV, ASF, AVI, FLV, MKV, WEBM
- Video playing resolutions: FHD (1920 × 1080 pixels) 30 fps
- Audio playing formats: MP3, M4A, 3GA, AAC, OGG, OGA, WAV, WMA, AMR, AWB, FLAC, MID, MIDI, XMF, MXMF, IMY, RTTTL, RTX, OTA

==== Cameras ====
===== Main (back) camera =====
- Single 13 MP CMOS, f/1.9 aperture, flash, auto-focus

===== Front camera =====
- Single 5 MP CMOS, f/1.9 aperture, fixed focus

===== Connectivity =====
- ANT+: Yes
- USB version: 2.0
- Location technologies: GPS, GLONASS
- Audio port: 3.5 mm audio jack
- MHL: No
- Wi-Fi: 802.11 b/g/n 2.4 GHz
- Wi-Fi Direct: Yes
- DLNA support: No
- NFC: Yes
- Bluetooth version: 4.1
- Bluetooth profiles: A2DP, AVRCP, DI, HFP, HID, HOGP, HSP, MAP, OPP, PAN, PBAP, SAP
- PC Sync. Samsung Smart Switch

===== Battery =====
- Standard battery capacity: 2900m Ah, not removable
- Fast charging: Yes
- Stated Internet usage time (3G): up to 14h
- Stated Internet usage time (LTE): up to 14h
- Stated Internet usage time (Wi-Fi): up to 16h
- Stated video playback time: up to 14h
- Stated audio playback time: up to 75h
- Stated talk time: up to 16h (3G W-CDMA)

== Design ==
Samsung Galaxy A5 (2016) has an aluminum and glass body, unlike Samsung Galaxy A5 (2015), the A5 (2016) has a larger 5.2-inch display compared to the 5-inch display of predecessor Galaxy A5. The A5 (2016) display is protected by Corning Gorilla Glass 4, also on the phone's backside.

== Software ==
The Samsung Galaxy A5 (2016) launched with the Android 5.1.1 "Lollipop" operating system. Samsung released the Android 6.0.1 "Marshmallow" update in February 2017 and then Android 7.1.1 "Nougat" update in December 2018 for the phone.

== Variants ==
Model	Processor	SIM	Region
SM-A510F	Samsung Exynos 7 Octa 7580	Single	Europe (some countries), Israel and South Africa
SM-A510F/DS	Samsung Exynos 7 Octa 7580	Dual	Russia, Kazakhstan, Ukraine and Caucasus countries (Armenia, Azerbaijan, Georgia)
SM-A510FD	Samsung Exynos 7 Octa 7580	Dual	Middle East, Africa, Asia
SM-A510Y	Samsung Exynos 7 Octa 7580	Single	Australia and New Zealand
SM-A510Y/DS	Samsung Exynos 7 Octa 7580	Dual	Philippines and Taiwan
SM-A510M	Samsung Exynos 7 Octa 7580	Single	Latin America
SM-A510M/DS	Samsung Exynos 7 Octa 7580	Dual	Brazil
SM-A5100	Qualcomm Snapdragon 615	Single	China and Hong Kong
SM-A510S	Samsung Exynos 7 Octa 7580	Single	South Korea (SK Telecom)
SM-A510K	Samsung Exynos 7 Octa 7580	Single	South Korea (KT Corporation)
