= Samsung Galaxy A3 (2016) =

2015 Android smartphone

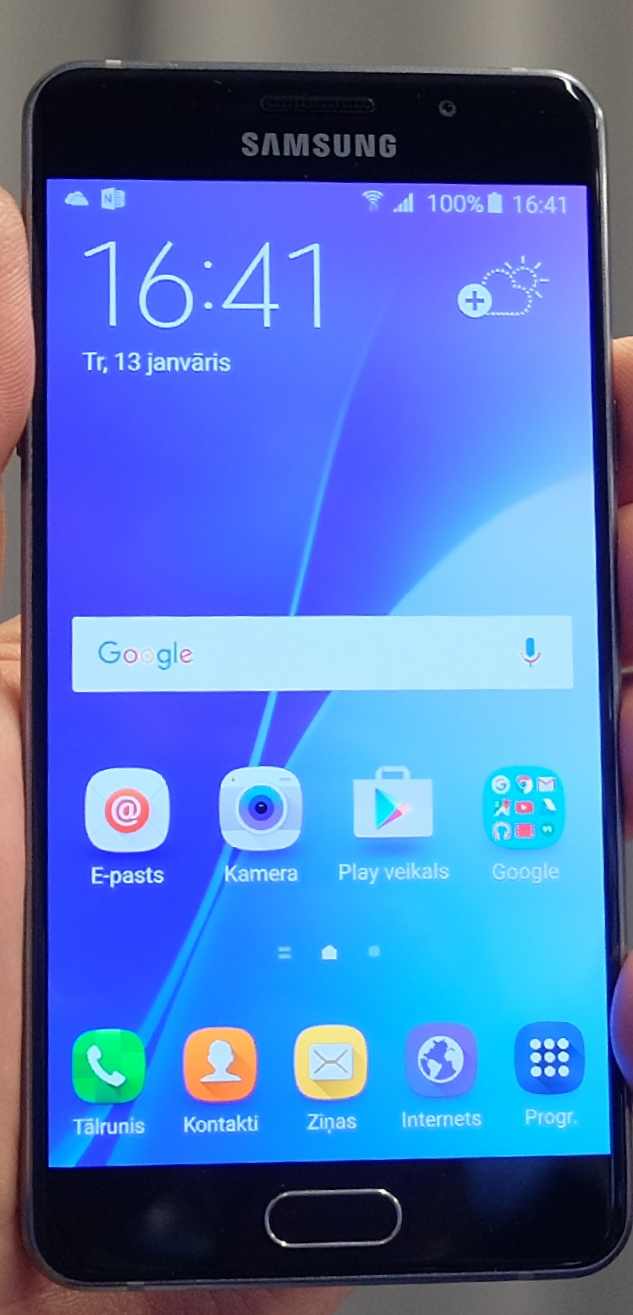
- Brand: Samsung Galaxy
- Manufacturer: Samsung Electronics
- Type: Touchscreen smartphone
- Series: Galaxy A series
- First released: 2016
- Predecessor: Samsung Galaxy A3 (2015)
- Successor: Samsung Galaxy A3 (2017)
- Related: Samsung Galaxy A9 (2016); Samsung Galaxy A5 (2016); Samsung Galaxy A7 (2016); Samsung Galaxy Feel
- Compatible networks: 2G, 3G, 4G
- Form factor: Slate
- Dimensions: 134.5×65.2×7.3 mm (5.30×2.57×0.29 in)
- Weight: 132 g (5 oz)
- Operating system: Original: Android 5.1.1 "Lollipop"; Current: Android 7.0 "Nougat" with Samsung Experience Unofficial: Android 13 "Tiramisu" via LineageOS 20.0
- System-on-chip: Exynos 7578
- CPU: Exynos 7578: Quad core 1.5GHz Cortex-A53
- GPU: Mali-T720MP2
- Memory: 1.5 GB RAM
- Storage: 16 GB
- Removable storage: up to 128 GB
- Battery: 2300 mAh (non-removable)
- Rear camera: 13 MP
- Front camera: 5 MP
- Display: 4.7 in (120 mm) Super AMOLED HD display with Corning Gorilla Glass 4, 720×1280 px, 312 ppi
- Connectivity: 802.11 b/g/n, Wi-Fi hotspot; Bluetooth v4.1, A2DP; USB 2.0 via microUSB
- Data inputs: Multi-touch touchscreen
- Model: SM-A310x (Last letter varies by carrier & international models)
- Codename: a3xelte

Samsung Galaxy A3 (2016) or Samsung Galaxy A3 2016 Edition is an Android smartphone produced by Samsung Electronics. It was introduced on 2 December 2015, along with the Galaxy A5 (2016), Galaxy A7 (2016), and Galaxy A9 (2016).

== Hardware ==
The 2016-release Galaxy A3 is equipped with the Exynos 7578 system-on-chip, which has two clusters of four cores, but Samsung decided to lock one cluster for unknown reasons. The smartphone has 1.5 GB of RAM and 16 GB of internal storage, with support for removable MicroSD cards of up to 128 GB. The device's MicroSD card slot has been designed to allow insertion of a SIM card, and thus Galaxy A3 (2016) can also be used in Dual SIM mode.

In Japan, it is exclusively sold as Samsung Galaxy Feel, with 3 GB of RAM and 32 GB of internal storage, with support for removable MicroSD cards of up to 256 GB, as well as a Samsung Exynos 7870 processor, Android 7.0 Nougat with Samsung Experience UI and IP68 rating for water and dust resistance.

== Design ==
The Samsung Galaxy A3 (2016) has an aluminium and glass body, unlike Samsung Galaxy A3, the A3 (2016) has a larger 4.7-inch (120 mm) display compared to the 4.5-inch (110 mm) display of predecessor Galaxy A3. The A3 (2016)'s display is protected by Corning Gorilla Glass 4, also on the back side of the phone.

== Availability ==
The Galaxy A3 (2016) was released in the 1st Quarter of 2016. As of April 2016, this model is available in Europe, Africa, Latin America and Asia. It is not available in North America and India; there, only Galaxy A5 (2016) and Galaxy A7 (2016) are available.

=== Variants ===
Model	Processor	SIM	Region
SM-A310F	Samsung Exynos 7578	Single	Europe
SM-A310F/DS	Samsung Exynos 7578	Dual	Eastern Europe, Middle East, Africa and Asia
SM-A310Y	Samsung Exynos 7578	Single	Australia and New Zealand
SM-A310M	Samsung Exynos 7578	Single	Brazil and Latin America
SC-04J (known as Samsung Galaxy Feel)	Samsung Exynos 7870	Single	Japan
