= Samsung Galaxy A7 (2015) =

Android phablet by Samsung

- Brand: Samsung
- Type: Smartphone
- Series: Galaxy A series
- First released: 12 January 2015; 11 years ago
- Predecessor: Samsung Galaxy Alpha
- Successor: Samsung Galaxy A7 (2016)
- Related: Samsung Galaxy A3/A5/A8 (2015); Samsung Galaxy E7; Samsung Galaxy J7
- Compatible networks: 2G, 3G (UMTS/HSPA), 4G (LTE)
- Dimensions: 151 mm (5.9 in) H 76.2 mm (3.00 in) W 6.3 mm (0.25 in) D
- Weight: 141 g (5.0 oz)
- Operating system: Original: Android 4.4.4 "KitKat"; Current: Android 6.0.1 "Marshmallow"
- System-on-chip: Dual SIM: Qualcomm Snapdragon 615 MSM8939; LTE: Samsung Exynos 5 Octa 5430
- CPU: Quad-core 1.5 GHz Cortex-A53 & quad-core 1.0 GHz Cortex-A53 (LTE/3G Dual SIM model); Quad-core 1.8 GHz Cortex-A15 & quad-core 1.3 GHz Cortex-A7 (LTE model)
- GPU: Dual SIM: Adreno 405; LTE: Mali-T628MP6
- Memory: 2 GB RAM
- Storage: 16 GB
- Removable storage: Up to 64 GB
- Battery: Non-removable Li-Ion 2600 mAh
- Rear camera: 13 MP
- Front camera: 5 MP
- Display: 5.5 in (140 mm) 1920x1080 pixel (401 ppi) Full HD Super AMOLED; Gorilla Glass 4
- Connectivity: WLAN, Bluetooth, USB
- Model: SM-A700x (Last letter varies by carrier & international models)

The Samsung Galaxy A7 (2015) is an Android-based smartphone manufactured by Samsung Electronics and released in February 2015.

== History ==
The Samsung Galaxy A7 serves as one of the successors to the Samsung Galaxy Alpha. It was released alongside the Samsung Galaxy A3 and A5. It was first released with Android 4.4.4 KitKat, however, Android Android 6.0.1 Marshmallow was made available for the phone via a software update in June 2016. It serves as the high-end variant of the Galaxy A series. It was succeeded by the Samsung Galaxy A7 (2016).

== Features ==
The Samsung Galaxy A7 features a 5.5-inch super-AMOLED display, and a front and rear camera of 5 and 13 megapixels, respectively. The phone has a micro-USB port that can be used for charging as well as transferring data. In terms of wireless connectivity, the phone supports Wi-Fi 802.11a/b/g/n, as well as mobile hotspot capability (if supported by the carrier). Built into the Galaxy A7 are accelerometer, proximity, compass and light sensors.
