= 2017 edition of the Samsung Galaxy A series =

Series of three smart phones released in 2017

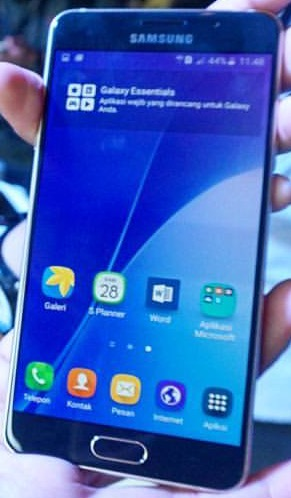
Samsung Galaxy A7

On January 2, 2017, Samsung unveiled the 2017 edition of the Galaxy A series, comprising three models. This move marks Samsung's first product launch since the discontinuation of the Galaxy Note 7 back in October 2016. Following the unveiling, Samsung announced that they would sell up to 20 million smartphones, targeting Western and Eastern Europe, Africa, Asia, and Latin America.

== General features ==
Newly improved features include 16-megapixel front and back cameras, an Exynos 7 Octa 7880 SoC, a 3D glass display (similar to Galaxy S6 edge+, Galaxy Note 5 and Galaxy S7), barometer and gyroscope sensors and IP68 certification for water and dust resistance as well as support for Gear 360 (2017). The new design of the series are very similar to the Galaxy S7 and the S7 Edge, released in March 2016. This was the last Galaxy A series to use the TouchWiz user interface, before being superseded by Samsung Experience and One UI in later models.

Overview of specifications
Model		A3	A5	A7
Support status		Unsupported		
Dates	Announced	January 2017		
Dates	Released	January 2017		
OS	Initial	TouchWiz Grace UX; Android 6		
OS	Latest	Experience 9.0; Android 8		One UI 1.1; Android 9
Dimensions mm (in)	Height	135.4 (5.33)	146.1 (5.75)	156.8 (6.17)
Dimensions mm (in)	Width	66.2 (2.61)	71.4 (2.81)	77.6 (3.06)
Dimensions mm (in)	Depth	7.9 (0.31)		
Weight g (lb)		138 (0.304)	157 (0.346)	186 (0.410)
Colors				
Display	Size	4.7 in (120 mm)	5.2 in (130 mm)	5.7 in (140 mm)
Display	Resolution	720 x 1280	1080 x 1920	
Display	Refresh Rate	60 Hz		
Display	Type	Super AMOLED		
Front camera		8 MP	16 MP	
Rear cameras		13 MP	16 MP	
RAM		2 GB	3 GB	
Storage		16 GB	32 GB; 64 GB	32 GB
Processor		Samsung; Exynos 7870 Octa	Samsung; Exynos 7880 Octa	
Battery	Capacity (mAh)	2350	3000	3600
Battery	Replaceable	No		
Battery	Fast Charging	No	18 W	
NFC		Yes		
IP rating		IP68		

=== Custom ROMs ===
The Galaxy A5 and A7 allow for bootloader unlocking and custom ROMs installs, and as a result the phone can be upgraded to Android 11 with the degoogled iodéOS.

== Models ==
=== Galaxy A3 ===
This series' Galaxy A3 runs Android 6.0.1 Marshmallow with TouchWiz user interface right out-of-the-box, but was updated during November 2017 to Android 7.0 Nougat and once again in May 2018 to run Android 8.0 Oreo. The smartphone features an Exynos 7870 SoC consisting an octa-core ARM Cortex-A53 CPU and Mali-T830 GPU and backed by 2 GB RAM and 16 GB internal storage expandable to 256 GB via the MicroSD slot which can also be used for a second Nano-SIM.

The device retains a non-removable battery like its predecessor and its battery is rated at 2350mAh. Its extra features similar to the features found in Samsung's 2016 flagships include IP68 water resistance, Always On Display, and 3D glass backing with Gorilla Glass 4. A new "Always On Display" functionality displays a clock, calendar, and notifications on-screen when the device is in standby. It also features an FM radio.

This handset is currently the last in the A3 series, and also the last Samsung handset to feature a screen smaller than 5" (excluding the Japan-only Galaxy Feel).

Just like its predecessors, the Galaxy A3 (2017) was not made available in the United States, China, Malaysia and India.

Variants
Model	Processor	SIM	Region
SM-A320FL	Samsung Exynos; 7 Octa 7870	Single	Europe
SM-A320F	Samsung Exynos; 7 Octa 7870	Single	Asia, Africa, Oceania, Middle East, Russia, Kazakhstan, Ukraine
SM-A320F/DS	Samsung Exynos; 7 Octa 7870	Dual	Asia, Africa, Oceania, Middle East, Russia, Kazakhstan, Ukraine
SM-A320Y	Samsung Exynos; 7 Octa 7870	Single	Mexico, New Zealand
SM-A320Y/DS	Samsung Exynos; 7 Octa 7870	Dual	Latin America, Indonesia, Thailand

=== Galaxy A5 ===
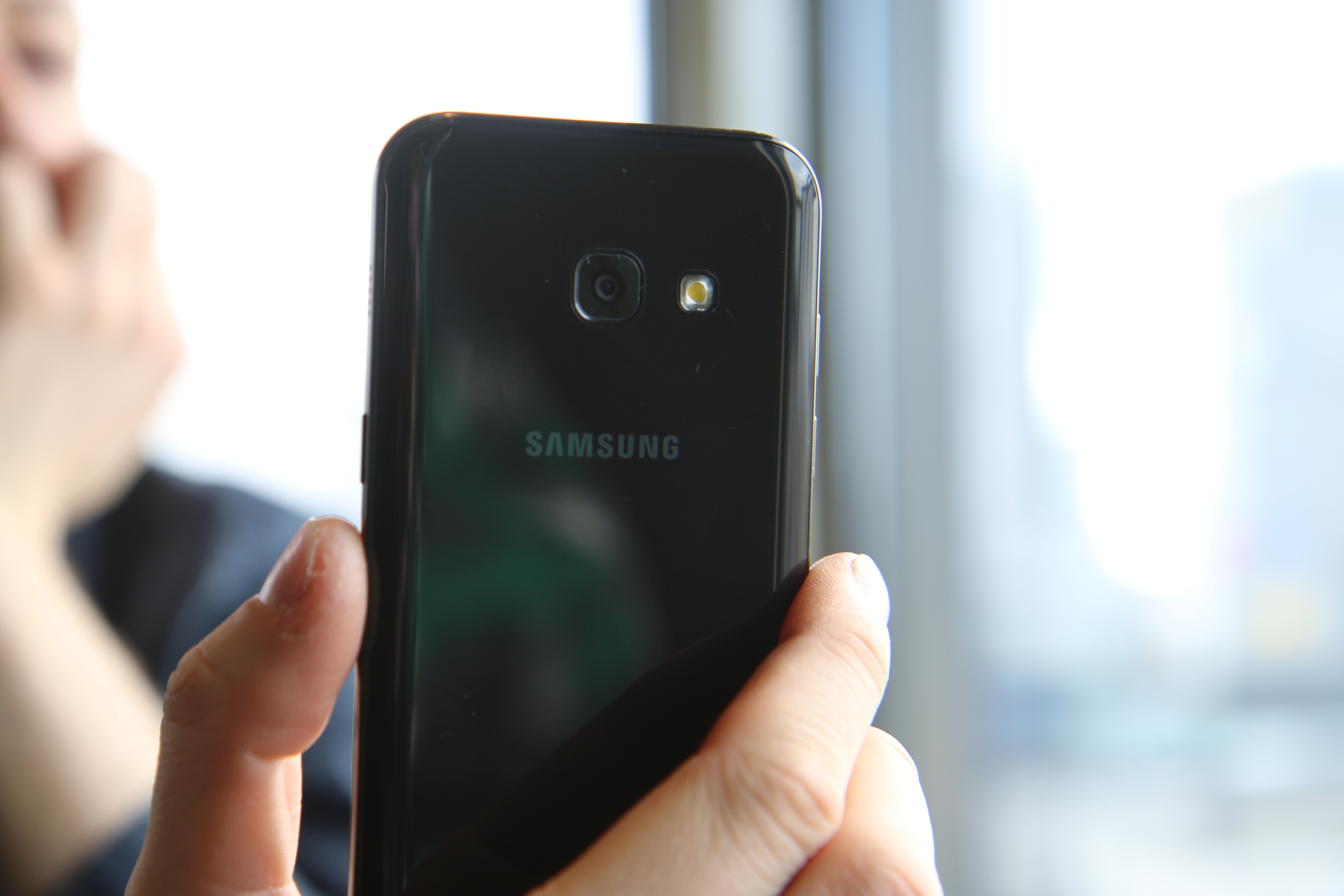
Backside with camera

This series' Galaxy A5 runs Android 6.0.1 Marshmallow right out of the box and runs on TouchWiz interface, but was updated during November 2017 to Android 7.0 Nougat and once again in May 2018 to run Android 8.0 Oreo. The smartphone features an Exynos 7880 SoC consisting of 8 ARM Cortex-A53 backed by the Mali-T830 GPU and sports 3 GB of RAM and 32 GB internal storage, expandable to 256 GB via a dedicated MicroSD slot that it has unlike the predecessors of the A5 (which it was placed in the second Nano-SIM slot). The device retains a non-removable battery like its predecessor, rated at 3000 mAh with fast-charging capabilities. Its extra features similar to Samsung's 2016 flagships include IP68 water resistance, Always On Display and 3D glass backing with Gorilla Glass 4. A new "Always On display" functionality displays a clock, calendar and notifications on screen when the device is in standby.

Unlike its predecessors, the Galaxy A5 (2017) was not released in the United States. However, the Galaxy A5 (2017) was going to be sold in Canada, unlike the 2016 edition.

Variants
Model	Processor	SIM	Region
SM-A520F	Samsung Exynos; 7 Octa 7880	Single	Europe, Asia, Africa, Latin America, Oceania, Middle East
SM-A520F/DS	Samsung Exynos; 7 Octa 7880	Dual	Russia, Kazakhstan, Ukraine, UAE
SM-A520W	Samsung Exynos; 7 Octa 7880	Single	Canada

=== Galaxy A7 ===
This series' Galaxy A7 runs Android 6.0.1 Marshmallow out-of-the-box and runs on Grace UX interface (and upgradable to Android 7.0 "Nougat" and Android 8.0 "Oreo" with Samsung Experience 8.1 and 9.0 respectively). The smartphone features an Exynos 7880 SoC consisting of 8 ARM Cortex-A53 backed by the Mali-T830MP3 GPU and sports 3 GB of RAM and 32 GB of internal storage, expandable to 256 GB via a MicroSD card slot. Unlike the previous version of the A7, it has a dedicated MicroSD card slot allowing both a second SIM Card in dual SIM models and MicroSD card to be used at the same time.

The device retains a non-removable battery like its predecessor, rated at 3600mAh with fast-charging capabilities. Its extra features, similar to Samsung's 2016 flagship's, include IP68 water resistance, Always-on Display, and 3D glass backing with Gorilla Glass 4. A new "Always On display" functionality displays a clock, calendar, and notifications on-screen when the device is in standby. The international model of the Galaxy A7 2017 received the latest and last Android 8.0 Oreo update in 2018. In September 2019, The SK Telecom model of the Galaxy A7 2017 received One UI with Android Pie due to it launching with Android Nougat.

Unlike its predecessors, the Galaxy A7 will not be coming to the United States, Western and Central Europe as well as Caucasus countries and China. While Samsung Galaxy A7 (2015) had broader availability in Europe, this model was never sold in that region because it was being deemed too expensive and also due to near-direct competition against Samsung Galaxy S7. Samsung will instead sell the Samsung Galaxy A3 (2017) and Samsung Galaxy A5 (2017) to these countries instead.

Variants
Model	Processor	SIM	Region
SM-A720F	Samsung Exynos; 7 Octa 7880	Single	Asia, Africa, Latin America, Oceania, Middle East
SM-A720F/DS	Samsung Exynos; 7 Octa 7880	Dual	Caucasus, Russia, Kazakhstan, Ukraine
SM-A720S	Samsung Exynos; 7 Octa 7880	Single	South Korea (SK Telecom)

== Critical reception ==
Svet Kompjutera praised the A3 and A5's build quality and performance, noting that the difference in speed between the two is not great in everyday usage. The A5's camera was assessed as above-average in the market segment. The price of the A5 was judged as reasonable, but the A3's price was seen unfavorably.
