= Samsung Galaxy A9 (2016) =

2015 Android-based smartphone by Samsung

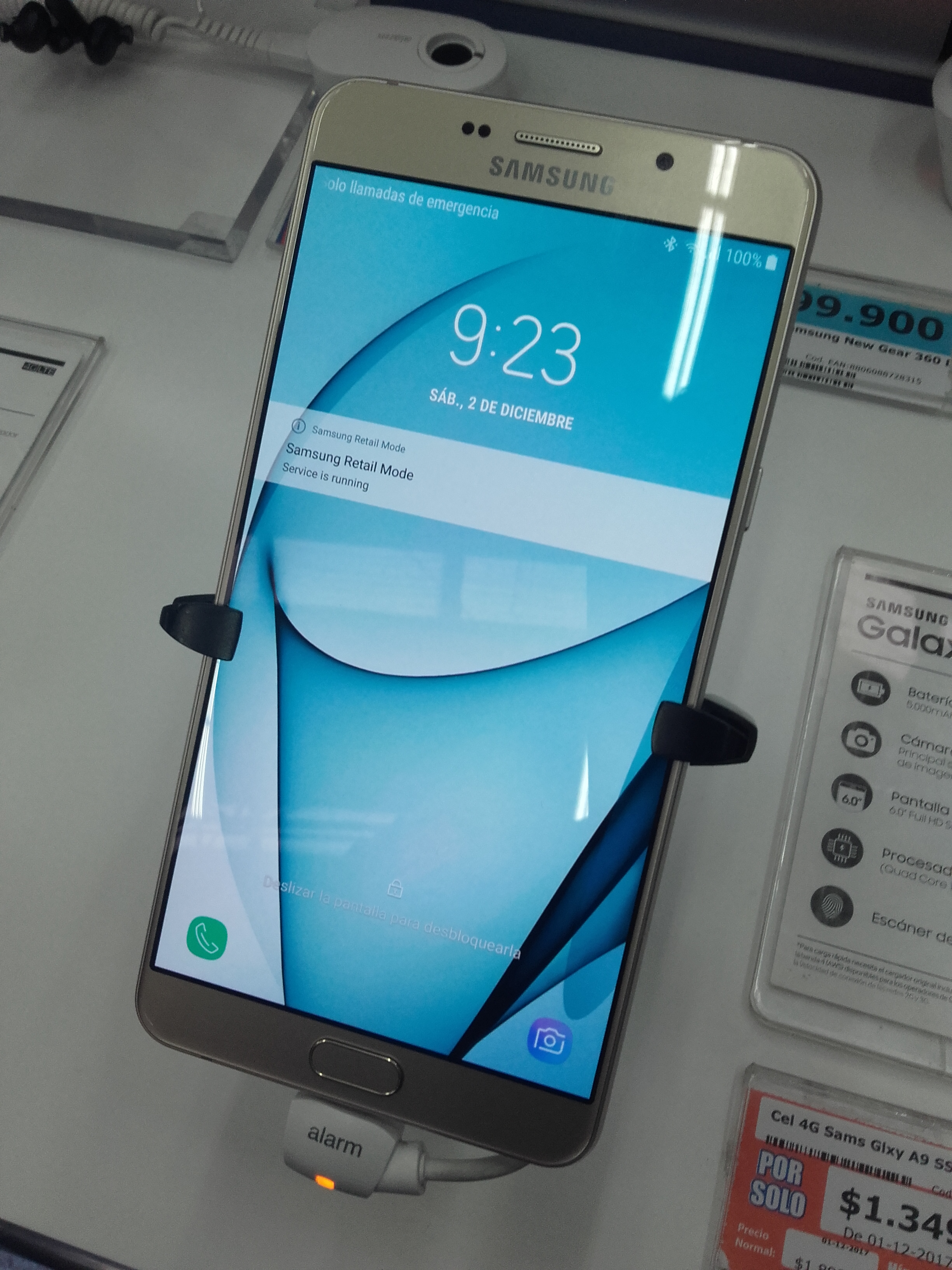
- Brand: Samsung Galaxy
- Manufacturer: Samsung Electronics
- Type: Phablet
- Series: Galaxy A series
- First released: December 2, 2015
- Availability by region: December 15, 2015
- Discontinued: 2018
- Successor: Samsung Galaxy A9 (2018)
- Related: Samsung Galaxy A3 (2016); Samsung Galaxy A5 (2016); Samsung Galaxy A7 (2016); Samsung Galaxy A9 Pro (2016)
- Compatible networks: 2G, 3G (UMTS/HSPA), 4G (LTE)
- Form factor: Slate
- Dimensions: 161.7 × 80.9 × 7.4 mm
- Weight: 200 g (7 oz)
- Operating system: Original: Android 5.1.1 "Lollipop"; Current: Android 6.0.1 "Marshmallow"
- System-on-chip: 64-bit Qualcomm Snapdragon 652
- CPU: Quad-Core 1.8 GHz ARM Cortex-A72 (lock 2 cores) + Quad-Core 1.4 GHz ARM Cortex-A53
- GPU: Adreno 510
- Memory: 3GB RAM
- Storage: 32GB
- Removable storage: up to 128GB
- Battery: 4000mAh (non-removable) with fast-charging
- Rear camera: 13 MP
- Front camera: 8 MP
- Display: 6.0" Super AMOLED FHD display with Corning Gorilla Glass 4, 1080×1920px
- Connectivity: 802.11 a/b/g/n, Wi-Fi hotspot; Bluetooth v4.1, A2DP; USB 2.0 via microUSB
- Data inputs: List: Multi-touch capacitive touchscreen; Fingerprint sensor; 3 push buttons; aGPS; GLONASS; Gyroscope; Accelerometer; Digital compass
- Model: SM-A9000 (A9); SM-A9100 (A9 Pro) (Last letter varies by carrier & international models)

Samsung Galaxy A9 or Samsung Galaxy A9 2016 Edition is an Android phablet smartphone produced by Samsung Electronics. It was introduced on January 15, 2016, along with the Samsung Galaxy A3 (2016), Samsung Galaxy A5 (2016), and Samsung Galaxy A7 (2016).
