= Mega =

Mega or MEGA may refer to:

== Science ==
- mega-, a metric prefix denoting 10^{6}
- Mega (number), a certain very large integer in Steinhaus–Moser notation
- "mega-" a prefix meaning "large" that is used in taxonomy
- Gravity assist, for Moon-Earth gravity assist and Mars-Earth gravity assist

== Business ==
- Aixam-Mega, a French automobile manufacturer based in Aix-les-Bains, Savoie
- Megaupload, a file sharing site seized by the FBI
- Mega (service), a cloud storage and file hosting service
- Mega Aircompany, a charter airline based in Almaty, Kazakhstan
- Mega Enterprise, a South Korean company that specialises in developing games
- MEGA International Srl., a French software company
- Mega Maldives, a Maldivian airline
- MEGA, a Russian chain of supermarkets, until september 2023 owned by IKEA

== Music ==
- Mega (Yacht album), 2005
- Mega (Blank Banshee album), 2016
- Mega Records, a US record label
- Mega Records, former name of Danish record company Edel-Mega Records

== Radio ==
- KLOL (Mega 101), a Spanish radio station in Houston
- KXOL-FM (Mega 96.3), a Spanish radio station in Los Angeles
- WSKQ-FM (Mega 97.9), a Spanish radio station in New York City
- WMEG (Mega 106.9), a Spanish radio station in Puerto Rico

== People ==
- Megawati Sukarnoputri (born 1947), former Indonesian president
- Megawati Hangestri Pertiwi (born 1999), Indonesian women's volleyball player
- Ram Charan Teja (born 1985), Indian actor; sometimes nicknamed Mega Power Star
- Mega (wrestler), ring name of Cesar Caballero
- Mega Banton (born 1973), Jamaican dancehall deejay
- Christopher J. Mega (1930–2011), New York politician and judge
- Vordul Mega (born 1979), American rapper

== Places ==
- Mega, Ethiopia, a town in Ethiopia
- Mega, Indonesia, a town in Western New Guinea, Indonesia

== Technology ==
- Junghans Mega, the world's first radio-controlled wristwatch with hands
- Mega (service), a file hosting service offered by Mega Cloud Services, a company based in Auckland, New Zealand
- Mega (NES peripheral), a programmable controller for the Nintendo Entertainment System
- Mega Drive, a 16 bit game console created by Sega
- Middle Eastern Geodatabase for Antiquities (MEGA), geographic information system
- Molecular Evolutionary Genetics Analysis, molecular biology software
- Samsung Galaxy Mega, an Android smartphone/tablet computer hybrid
- Li Mega, a battery electric minivan

== Television ==
- Mega (Chilean TV network), the first private television network of Chile
- Mega (Spanish TV channel), a Spanish private television channel owned by Atresmedia
- Mega (Ukrainian TV channel), a television channel in Ukraine
- Mega Channel, the Greek language terrestrial station of Greece and Cyprus
- Mega64, a low-budget series of comedy skits centered on video games
- "Mega", episode 18 of Law & Order season 10

== Other uses ==
- Mega (video game magazine), a defunct British video game magazine
- Mega (fashion magazine), a Filipino fashion and lifestyle magazine
- MEGA Role-Playing System
- Mega, a character from The Tribe
- Mega Millions, a major jackpot game in the U.S.
- MEGA Family Shopping Centre, a network of shopping malls in Russia operated by IKEA
- Megalophobia, Fear of massive objects
- MEGA Esports, a professional esports organization based in Bangkok, Thailand
- Marx-Engels-Gesamtausgabe, the complete works of Marx and Engels in German
- Metro-Link Express for Gandhinagar and Ahmedabad, rail transit in Gujarat, India
- Megatall, a skyscraper taller than 600 m (1,969 ft)
- Make Europe Great Again, a political slogan
- Ethnic Greek Minority for the Future, a Greek political party sometimes abbreviated as MEGA

== See also ==
- La Mega (disambiguation)
- Maga (disambiguation)
- Megabus (disambiguation)
- Mega Man (disambiguation)
- Mega TV (disambiguation)
- Megha (disambiguation)
- Meg (disambiguation)
