= Dirat al-Tulul =

Lava region in southern Syria

Coordinates: 33°21′27″N 37°3′19″E

Dirat al-Tulul (Arabic: ديرة التلول, romanized: Dirat at Tulūl, lit. 'Land of Hills'), and called locally in Levantine Arabic Diret el Tlūl, is a lava region in southern Syria. It lies about 65 kilometers east of Damascus, located in the central part of the Rif Dimashq administrative district (governorate or muhafazat).

== Geology and climate ==
Dirat al-Tulul forms the northernmost extension of the massive alkaline lava field of Harrat al-Shamah. To the south it is bordered by the al-Safa lava field, another part of the massive Harrat al-Shamah lava region. Dirat al-Tulul also forms the western part of the Syrian steppe known as Badiyat al-Sham.

Dirat al-Tulul contains more than 32 cinder cones, known as Tell (Arabic for hill).

This region receives between 100 and 200 mm. of precipitation per year and it is sparsely populated, due to its aridity and rocky terrain. It is used for pasture by nomadic and seminomadic Bedouin.

== List of volcanic cones in Dirat at Tulul ==
Tell ‘Ājer (Tell Aajer) 979 m.

Tell Daqwa (Tell Daqwa) 945 m.

Tell Um ‘Otek (Tell Um Otek) 935 m.

Tell Ja’afar (Tell Jaafar) 910 m.

Tell Um Msaraje (Tell Um Masarja) 906 m.

Tell Um el Meza (Tell Um el Meza) 889 m.

Tell Wasţāni (Tell Wastani) 889 m.

Tell Šimāli (Tell Shimali) 884 m.

Tell Ħuēmel (Tell Hweimel) 879 m

Tell As Skhāna (Tell As Skhana) 879 m.

Tell Qebli (Tell Qebli) 879 m.

Tell El Matalla (Tell El Matalla) 875 m.

Tell Abū Şafā (Tell Abu Safa) 870 m.

Tell Šayabe (Tell Shayaba) 845 m.

Tell El ‘Anţūr (Tell el Antoor) 823 m.

Tell Um Rqēbi (Tell Um Rqeibi) 811 m.

Tell Ħuējer (Tell Hweijer) 791 m.

Tell Khnēfes (Tell Khneifes) 763 m.

Tell Maqħūl (Tell Maqhool) 744 m.

Tell Salmān (Tell Salman) 738 m.
