= Jawa, Jordan =

Bronze Age archaeological site in eastern Jordan

Jawa
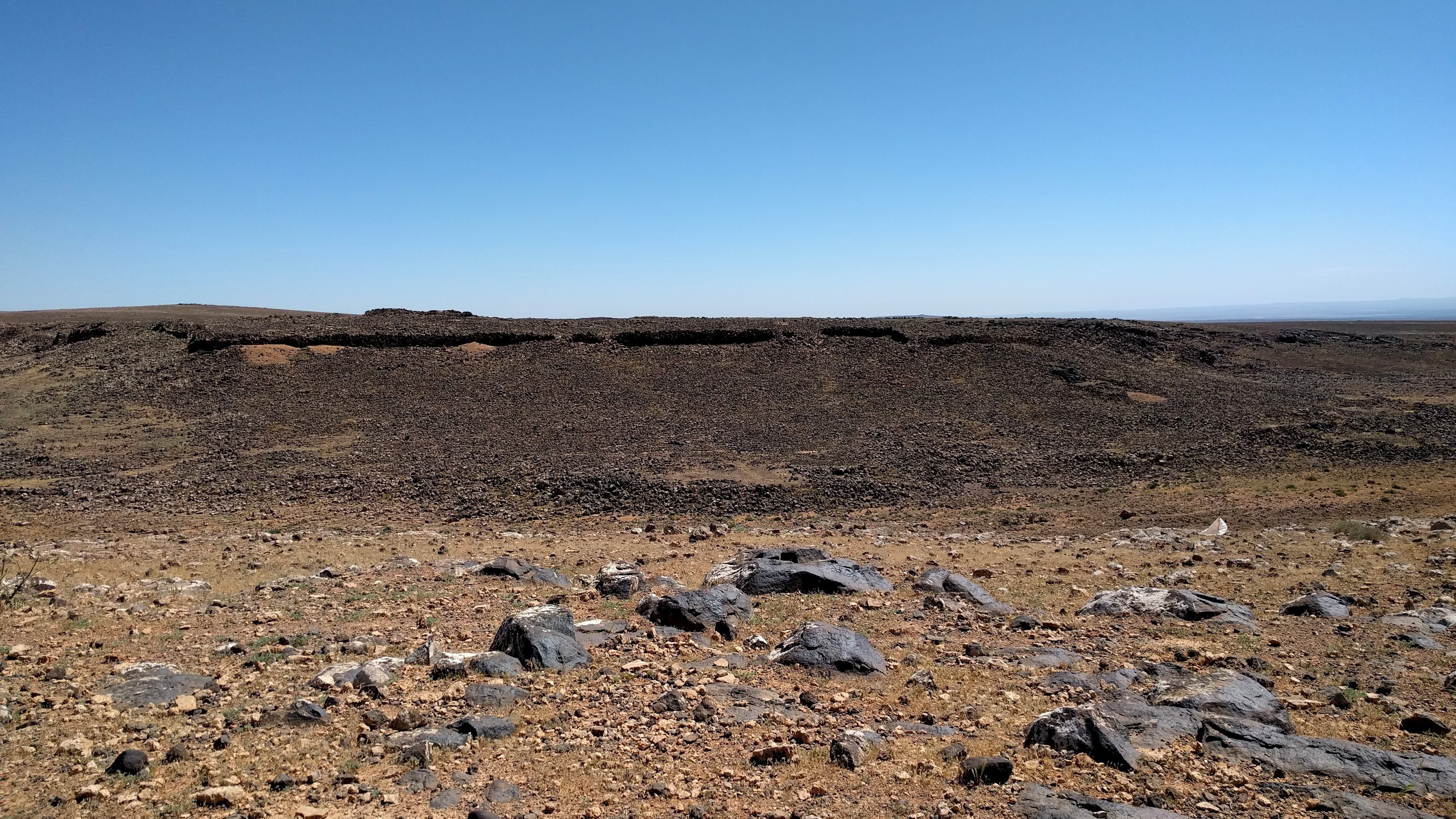
- View of Jawa from the south

- Location within Jordan
- 32°20′06″N 37°00′12″E
- Location: Jordan
- Region: Mafraq Governorate

Jawa is the site of the oldest proto-urban development in Jordan, dating from the late 4th millennium BC (Early Bronze Age). It is located in one of the driest areas of the Black Desert (Harrat al-Shamah) of Eastern Jordan.

Remains of dams have been found, the largest of which is a masonry gravity dam and the oldest known dam in the world. It was used as a protection from flash floods.

== Discovery and history of investigation ==
Jawa was first reported by French explorer Antoine Poidebard, who flew over and photographed the site in 1931, mistaking it for Roman ruins. Before and after Poidebard's discovery, several archaeological expeditions came close to but missed the site. Nelson Glueck visited it in 1947 but apparently failed to notice its significance, describing Jawa as a "small, filthy spring […] probably never more than a small police post." Finally, in 1950, an expedition led by epigrapher F. V. Winnett reached the site and documented some of the inscriptions there. Amongst their number was Lankester Harding, who suggested that the remains were not Roman but in fact dated to the Early Bronze Age.

Harding recommended the site to Svend Helms, who first visited the site in 1966 and directed excavations there between 1972 and 1976. In contrast to earlier assumptions about the site's lack of significance, Helms concluded that "Jawa is the best preserved fourth-millennium town yet discovered anywhere in the world: paradoxically in a place—the Black Desert—where it could hardly exist today and probably hardly when it was built."

== History ==
The town was built by a group of perhaps 2,000 migrants coming from the North or East. They had some understanding of urban life, as well as hydrology. It extended over 100,000 m^{2} and consisted of a walled town and extensive earthworks to divert winter floods from the wadi into a series of reservoirs. This work would have had to be completed by the first winter after the group's arrival; otherwise they would not have survived the following summer. It is estimated the work would have taken a minimum workforce of 700.

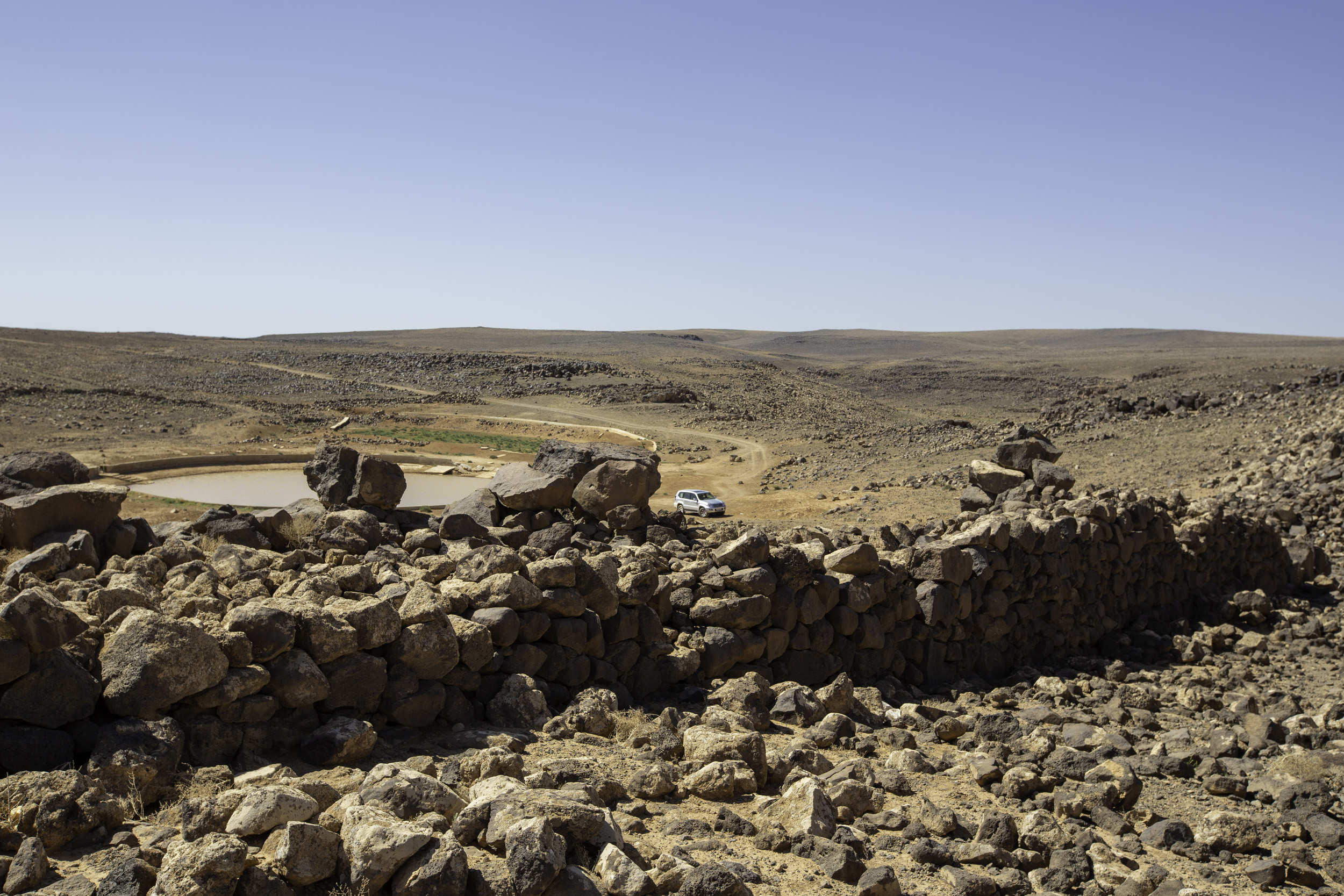
Jawa (2013)

It is located on the southern edge of an area of basalt which runs across Syria and eastern Jordan and is an attempt to harness the major water resources of Wadi Rajil: a dry river bed which floods irregularly during the winter months. Wadi Rajil has a catchment area of 300 km^{2} reaching 35 km north into Jebel Druze. The basalt allows very little water to soak into the ground. Any rainfall in the mountains results in violent short lived flash floods. The total annual flow down the wadi at Jawa is estimated to be 2,000,000 m^{3} per year arriving in a few dramatic winter floods with flows of 80–110 m^{3}/s. Research suggests that the community at Jawa could survive on 3% of that total flow: if they could store it in sufficient quantities to last through the four dry summer months. It would have to support their population of 2,000 to 5,000 as well as their large herds of sheep, goats and some cattle. Estimates based on bone counts indicate there may have been as many as 10,000 sheep and goats as well as 800 cattle. There were also 200 equids and 160 dogs. From seed remains it is apparent that some of the water was also used for irrigated agriculture. The inhabitants ate barley, wheat, chickpeas, lentils and grapes.

Based on the size and density of houses in the excavated areas, Helms estimated that the maximum population of the town was between 3,000 and 5,000. He also considered it short-lived: occupied for perhaps as little as a single generation before it was violently destroyed.

There is a fortified building located in the center of the ruins of the original town. It is believed to date from 2000 to 1500 BC, and is not associated with any contemporaneous stone structures.

== Water supply system ==
Jawa Dam
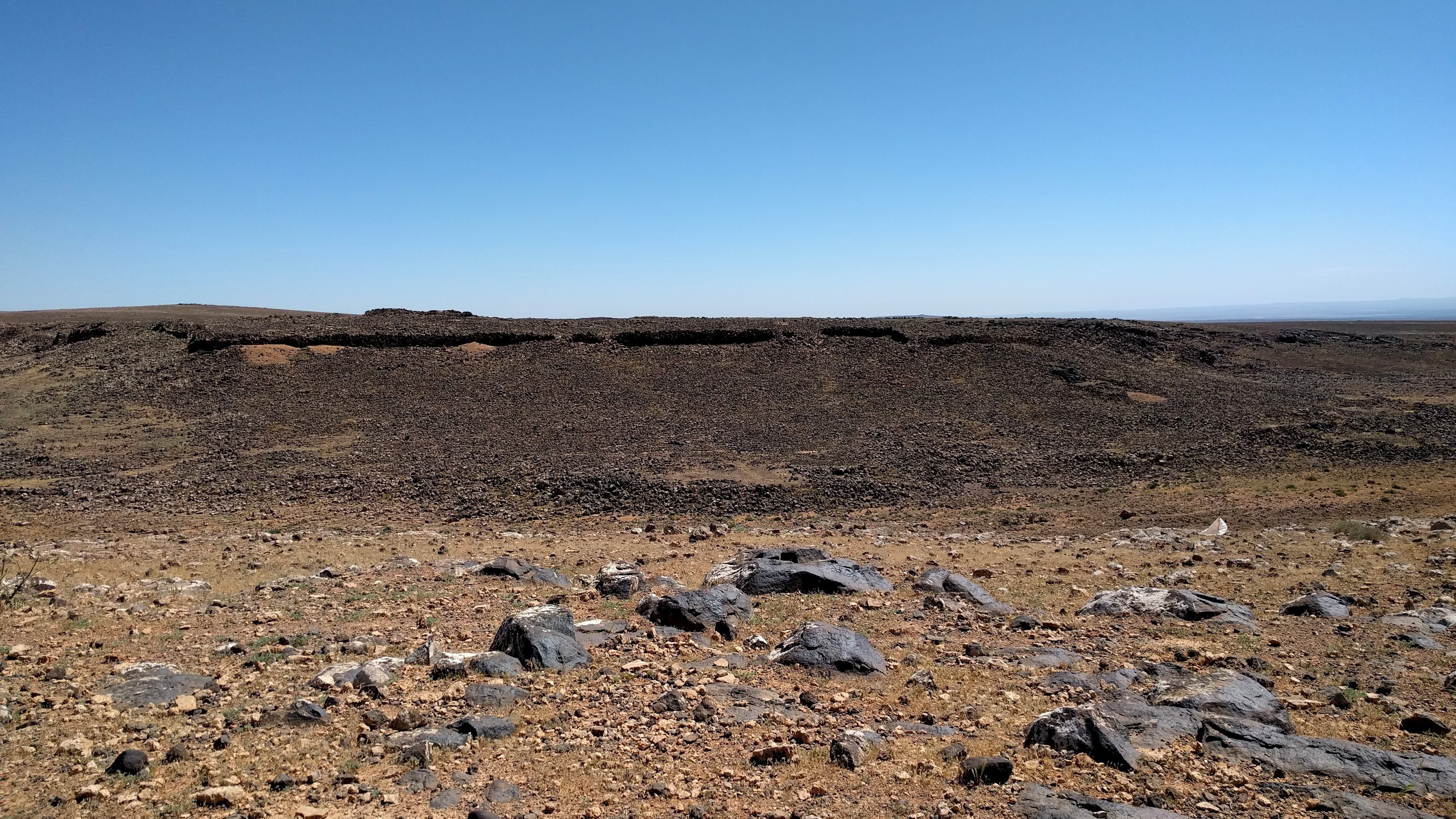

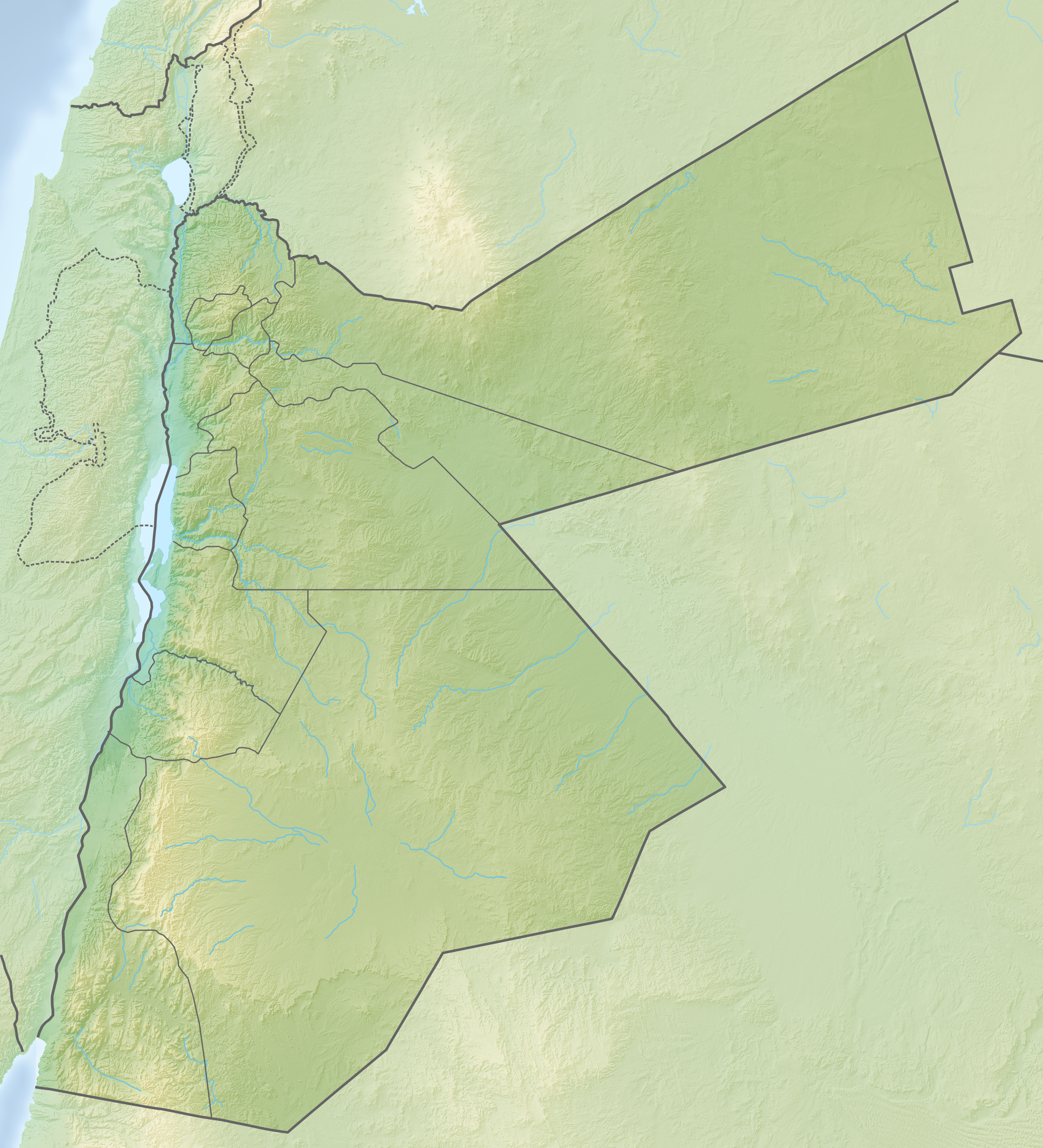
- Location within Jordan
- Location: Jawa, Mafraq Governorate, Jordan
- Coordinates: 32°20′06″N 37°00′12″E
- Construction began: ~3500 BC

Dam and spillways
- Type of dam: Gravity, masonry
- Impounds: Wadi Rajil
- Height: 4.5 m (15 ft)
- Length: 80 m (260 ft)
- Width (base): 4.5–5 m (15–16 ft)

Reservoir
- Creates: Jawa Reservoir
- Total capacity: 31,000 m^{3} (1,100,000 ft^{3}) est.

There are remains of three dams across Wadi Rajil at Jawa, part of an extensive water supply system that included other smaller dams, channels, and deflectors across the wadi to support the town. Two are deflection dams meant to channel water into a number of reservoirs. The third was an attempt at a reservoir dam, completely blocking the flow of the flood. It appears not to have survived more than one season. The other two probably ceased to function within a generation.

The largest is a masonry gravity dam, and the oldest known dam in the world, with recent carbon-14 dating putting initial construction between 3500 and 3400 BC. It was designed to divert water into three depressions to the west of the settlement. The feed canal was also used to fill a natural cave. The dam itself was built at an angle across the curve of the wadi. It may not have reached from bank to bank. It is speculated that even if the structure only withstood the flood for a short time, some water would have been diverted to the reservoirs.

The largest reservoir had a double wall, 80 metres long and 4–5 metres high, in-filled with sand and ash. Excavators found traces of revetments and a rudimentary apron on the up-stream face. An attempt to build a larger wall to expand the capacity of the reservoirs beside the town was not completed. The small amount of rainfall, perhaps 150 mm per year, which fell on local micro-catchments, was also harnessed by a long series of primitive canals leading to the reservoirs. This would have been a significant contribution in maintaining water levels between floods.

== See also ==
- Media related to Jawa, Jordan at Wikimedia Commons
