= Megas (disambiguation) =

Megas, or Magnús Þór Jónsson, (born 1945), is an Icelandic rock and roll singer, songwriter, and writer.

Megas may also refer to:

- Megas (album), first album by singer Megas
- Megas XLR, an American animated television series
- Megas logothetēs, an official or administrator of the Byzantine Empire
- Megas doux, the commander-in-chief of the Byzantine navy
  - Megas droungarios tou stolou, the second-in-command
- Megas droungarios tēs viglas/viglēs, senior judicial position of the Byzantine Empire

== See also ==
- The Megas (disambiguation)
- Mega (disambiguation)
- Mega-, a unit prefix in metric systems of units denoting a factor of one million
- The Magicks of Megas-tu, an episode of Star Trek: The Animated Series
