= Mega TV =

Mega TV may refer to:

- Mega TV (American TV network), a Spanish television network based in Florida
- MegaTV (Korea), a Korean IPTV service
- Mega Channel, a Greek television station
- Mega TV (Malaysia), a now defunct Malaysian cable television station
- Mega TV (Tamil), a Tamil language television channel from India
- Mega TV (Mozambique), a Mozambican television channel

== See also ==
- Red Televisiva Megavisión, a Chilean television station
- Other Mega television channels
