= La Mega =

La Mega may refer to:

== Companies ==
- La Mega Media, an American media company

== Radio stations ==
- KXOL-FM in Los Angeles, California
- WMEG and WEGM in Puerto Rico
- WOXY 97.7 FM in Mason, Ohio
- WSKQ-FM in New York City
- WSTL in Providence, Rhode Island
- WTIS in Tampa, Florida
- WTKZ in Allentown, Pennsylvania
- WWLA (FM) in Johnstown, Ohio

== See also ==
- Mega (disambiguation)
- The Megas (disambiguation)
