= MEG =

MEG may refer to:

- Mono-Ethylene glycol, an alternative name ethylene glycol, organic compound ethane-1,2-diol
- Madras Engineer Group, regiment of the Corps of Engineers of the Indian Army
- Maghreb-Europe Gas Pipeline, a natural gas pipeline linking Africa and Europe
- Magnetoencephalography, mapping brain activity by recording magnetic fields produced by currents in the brain
- Malange Airport, by IATA code, airport in Malanje, Angola
- Media General, by NYSE stock symbol, defunct American media company
- Melody Garden stop, by MTR station code, a light rail stop in Tuen Mun, Hong Kong
- Midland Examining Group, former exam board in England, Wales and Northern Ireland
- A Modern English Grammar on Historical Principles, a reference work by Otto Jespersen
- Motionless electromagnetic generator, purported perpetual motion machine
- The Mu to E Gamma experiment, a particle physics experiment in muon decay
- Multiple exciton generation, a concept in quantum electronics
- Musée d'ethnographie de Genève, an ethnographic museum in Geneva (Switzerland)
- Museum Ethnographers Group, a collective of ethnographic researchers
- Meg (singer), a living Japanese singer, songwriter and model
- Megaworld (stock symbol MEG), a Philippine real estate company
- Meghalaya, a state in northeastern India (postal code MEG)

== See also ==
- Meg (disambiguation)
- Meg, for people with the name
