= Harrat al-Sham =

Desert region in Syria and northern Arabia

Ḥarrat al-Shām Black Desert
- Desert
- Location within the Levant of the wider volcanic province it is part of
- Interactive map of Ḥarrat al-Shām
- Coordinates: 32°37′53″N 36°45′52″E
- Part of: Syrian Desert
- Water bodies: Lake Burqu' (see Qasr Burqu'); Qa Shubayqa
- Age: Oligocene, Neogene, Quaternary
- Geology: Basaltic volcanic field
- Volcanic field: Harrat Ash Shaam Volcanic Province (HASV)

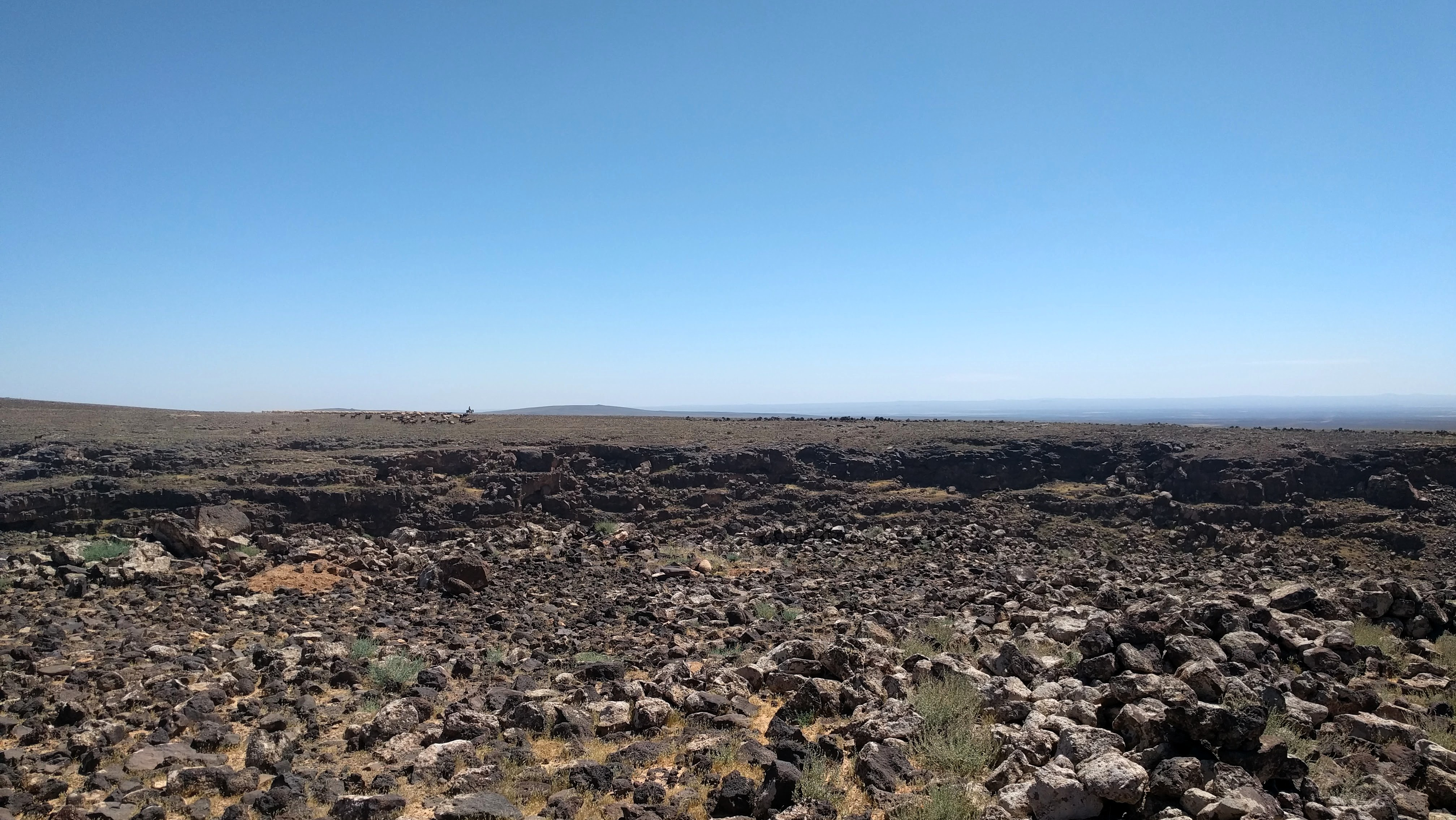
The Harrat near Jawa in eastern Jordan

The Ḥarrat al-Shām (Arabic: حَرَّة ٱلشَّام), (Note: Variously transcribed as the harra, Ḥarrat ash-Shāmah (حَرَّة ٱلشَّامَة) or Ḥarrate-Shāmah (حَرَّةِ شَامَة).) also known as the Harrat al-Harra or Harrat al-Shaba, and sometimes the Black Desert in English, is a region of rocky, basaltic desert straddling southern Syrian region and the northern Arabian Peninsula. It covers an area of some 40,000 km^{2} (15,000 sq mi) in the modern-day Syrian Arab Republic, Israel, Jordan, and Saudi Arabia. Vegetation is characteristically open acacia shrubland with patches of juniper at higher altitudes.

The Harrat has been occupied by humans since at least the Late Epipalaeolithic (c. 12,500–9500 BCE). One of the earliest known sites is Shubayqa 1 (occupied c. 12,600–10,000 BCE), a Natufian site where archaeologists have discovered the remains of the oldest known bread.

== Geology ==
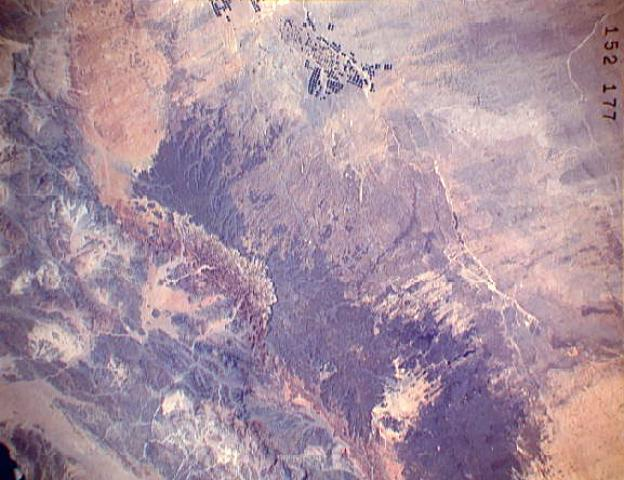
Harrah region from the Space Shuttle

The Harrat is part of a system of volcanic fields formed by tectonic activity from the Oligocene through to the Quaternary. This system, which geologists refer to as the 'Harrat Ash Shamah Volcanic Field', is the largest of several volcanic fields on the Arabian Plate, containing more than 800 volcanic cones and around 140 dikes. Activity began during the Miocene; an earlier eruptive stage at the southeastern end of the volcanic field, occurred during the late Pleistocene and the Holocene. It is known to have erupted in historic times.

The Jabal al-Druze, al-Safa and Dirat al-Tulul volcanic fields, among others, form the northern and Syrian part of this system. The Saudi Arabian portion of the Harrat Ash Shamah volcanic field extends across a 210 km-long (130-mile), roughly 75 km-wide (47-mile) northwest–southeast-trending area on the northeastern flanks of the Wadi Sirhan and reaches its 1,100 metres (3,600 ft) high point at Jabal al-Amud. It is in the Tabuk Province of northwest Saudi Arabia. and is one of a series of Quaternary volcanic fields paralleling the Red Sea coast.

== History and economy ==
The Harrat has traditionally been occupied by nomadic Bedouin of the Anizah confedaration. It It is primarily associated with the Ahl al-Jabal tribe, who graze sheep, goats, donkeys and camels there, but the Rwala, Zbaid, Ghayyath, Sardiyya and other tribes also use the area at times. Although the region as a whole is too dry for rainfed agriculture, seasonal wetlands such as the Qa' Shubayqa are used for growing cereals after they are flooded by winter rains. In the second half of the 20th century, many Bedouin settled in the village of Safawi, which grew up around a pumping station on the Kirkuk–Haifa oil pipeline (H5).

== Archaeological sites ==
- Desert kites

=== Jordan ===
- Jawa, Jordan, Early Bronze Age proto-urban settlement
- Qasr al-Azraq and Qasr 'Ain es-Sil, ancient desert castles in the Azraq oasis
- Qasr Burqu', ancient "desert castle"
- Qasr Usaykhim, an ancient fort northeast of Azraq
- Shubayqa 1, Natufian hunter-gatherer site with the oldest bread-making find in the world

== See also ==
- Syrian Desert
- Hauran, a historical region partially overlapping with the Harrat al-Sham
- List of volcanoes in Saudi Arabia
- Sarawat Mountains
  - Midian Mountains
