= Qasr Usaykhim =

Nabatean fortress located in the East of Jordan

- قصر أصيخم (Arabic)
- Asykhm, Iskhem, Aschim, Asikham, Akkham, Aseikhim
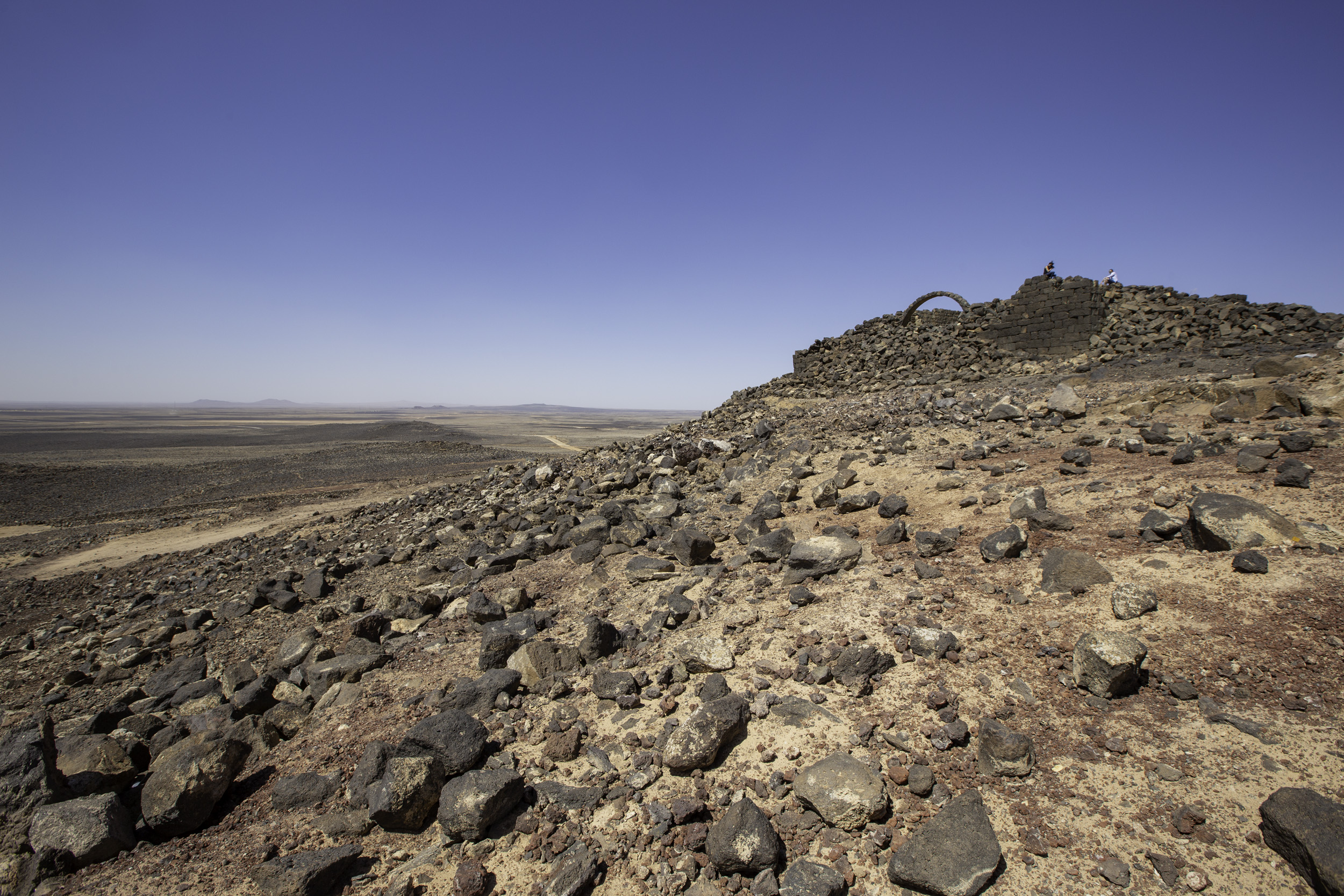
- Interactive map of Qasr Usaykhim
- 31.94633°N 36.95279°E
- Cultures: Nabataean, Roman
- Location: Jordan
- Region: Zarqa Governorate

Site notes
- Material: basalt
- Elevation: 624 m (2,047 ft)
- Length: 23 m (75 ft)
- Width: 23 m (75 ft)
- Archaeologists: Gertrude Bell, Aurel Stein, David L. Kennedy, Samuel Thomas Parker

Identifiers
- MEGA-J: 12399

Qasr Usaykhim or Qasr Aseikhin (Arabic: قصر أصيخم), is probably a Roman fortlet on the extreme eastern edge of the Limes Arabiae et Palaestinae. The solitary outpost would thus possess one of the most spectacular sites of all Roman forts in Jordan. The ruins of the structure are located on the crest of a volcano in the Syrian Desert, Zarqa Governorate and about 18 km northeast of the town of Azraq, overlooking the wadi and allowing vegetation to grow.

== Building history ==
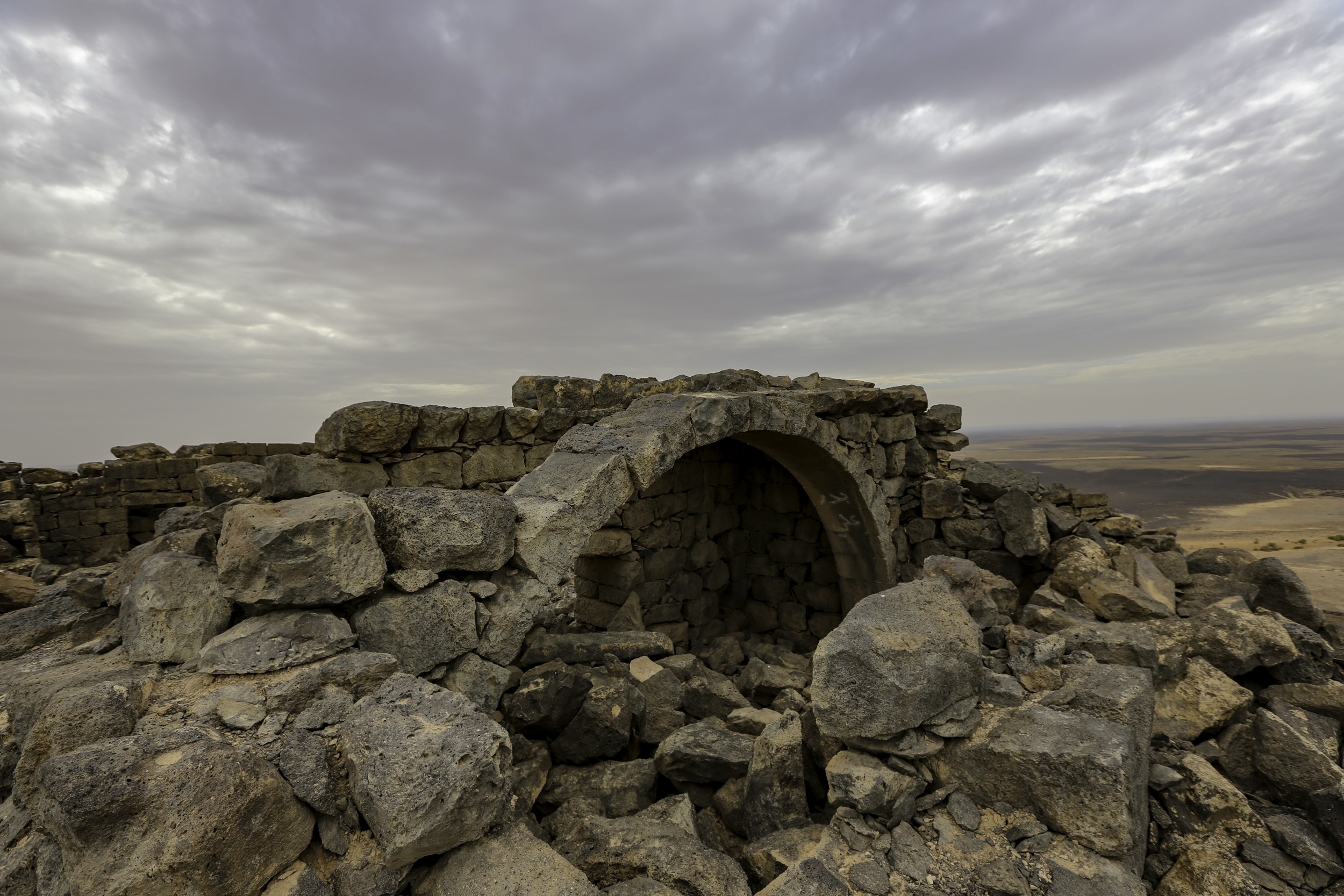
Remnants of an arch

Since no excavations have been carried out to date, it is difficult to make a chronological sequence of the settlement history on the tell. In the wide area around the site, flints could be collected during field excavations, in addition there are numerous other indications of prehistoric activities on the mountain and in its vicinity. More recent are the traces of diagonally placed chisel marks in a small quarry created at the tell, which are considered characteristic of the Nabataeans. A possible structural sequence, according to Kennedy's reflections, may have been initially a 1st century AD Nabataean defensive farmstead, where later, in the 3rd and/or early 4th century, a Roman outpost was established. The earliest date of a military use of the Tell by Roman troops would have been after the annexation of the Nabataean Empire in 106 AD. This task may also have been undertaken by Nabataeans in Roman service. As inscriptions from Al-Jawf, ancient Dumata, from the south-eastern end of the Wadi Sirhan, Nabataeans also served in the Roman army at outposts less than ten years after the Roman takeover. A final phase of use lasted until the late 6th century for Kennedy, according to evidence from the ceramic find deposit. It is possible that the site was last used for civilian purposes again. Apart from the chisel marks, there is so far no direct evidence for the immediate presence of Nabataeans on the tell. Among the abundant but difficult-to-identify surface pottery, Kennedy says that no Nabataean fragments have yet been picked out, though the American provincial Roman archaeologist and pottery specialist Samuel Thomas Parker (1950-2021), in his 1976 investigation, dated quite early sherds to the 1st century AD. Kennedy referred, in connection with a possible Nabataean origin of the Qasr, to the increased detection of corresponding Nabataean initiatives in the area and the opportunities that limited agriculture on the slopes of the Tell and in the Wadi Aseikhin could provide.

Like all stone-built Roman structures in the Azraq Depression, the small ruin on the tell is also made of basalt. The ground plan of the building forms a rectangle of about 23 metres and has an entrance to the west and another to the south. The rectangular central courtyard is surrounded on all four sides by vaulted hallways, the rear walls of which adjoin the enclosing wall. Both the inner and outer walls are uniformly one metre thick and have a two-shell masonry of well-cut basalt blocks. The core between the two wall shells is filled with rubble. Since hardly any wall joints are visible, only very little mortar can be found.

== Literature ==
- David L. Kennedy: The Roman Army in Jordan. Council for British Research in the Levant, Henry Ling, London 2004, ISBN 0-9539102-1-0, p. 66–68.
- David L. Kennedy, Robert Cowie: Archaeological Explorations on the Roman Frontier in North East Jordan: Some Further Notes. In: Annual of the Department of Antiquities of Jordan 28, Amman 1984, p. 321-332.
- David L. Kennedy: Archaeological Explorations on the Roman Frontier in North-east Jordan: The Roman and Byzantine Military Installations and Road Network on the Ground and from the Air (= BAR International Series 134), British Archaeological Reports, Oxford 1982, ISBN 0-86054-165-7, p. 107.
- Samuel Thomas Parker: Romans and Saracens. A History of the Arabian Frontier. (= Dissertation Series/American Schools of Oriental Research 6), Eisenbrauns, Winona Lake 1986, ISBN 0-89757-106-1. p. 178.
- Samuel Thomas Parker: Archaeological Survey of the „Limes Arabicus“: A Preliminary Report. In: Annual of the Department of Antiquities of Jordan 21, 1976, S. 19–31; here: p. 23.
