= Mega Man (disambiguation) =

Mega Man is a video game franchise created by Capcom.

Mega Man, Megaman or MegaMan may also refer to:

== Characters ==
- Mega Man (character), the title character from the eponymous video game series
- Megaman, a Marvel Comics villain who first appeared in Nova (vol. 1) #8 (April 1977)

== Music ==
- Megaman, member of UK garage/hip hop group So Solid Crew
- "MegaMan" (song), a 2011 song by Lil Wayne from album Tha Carter IV

== Television ==
- Mega Man (1994 TV series), a Japanese-Canadian-American animated television series
- MegaMan NT Warrior, a 2002 anime series
- Mega Man Star Force (TV series), a 2006 anime series
- Mega Man: Fully Charged, a 2018 American-Japanese-Canadian animated television series

== Video games ==
- Mega Man (original series)
  - Mega Man (1987 video game), first video game of the series
- Mega Man (1990 video game), released for DOS systems
- Mega Man (1995 video game), released for the Game Gear

== Other ==
- Mega Man: Upon a Star, a three-episode OVA series
- Mega Man (Archie Comics), a 2011–2015 American comic book series
- MegaMan Magee aka Tom Magee, a former strongman (who at that time performed under the nickname "Mega Man"), pro wrestler, and actor
- "The Return of Megaman", episode 14 of Team Knight Rider (1998)

== See also ==
- Mega Man II (disambiguation)
- Rockman (disambiguation), referring to the Japanese name for Mega Man
