= Mega TV (Mozambique) =

Mozambican television channel

- Country: Mozambique
- Broadcast area: Mozambique

Ownership
- Owner: Mega - Radio & Televisão, SA

History
- Launched: 2021

Links
- Website: mega.co.mz

Mega TV is a Mozambican commercial television network founded in 2021 by Mega - Radio & Televisão, SA. The channel defines itself as a "local, patriot and innovative" television station, broadcasting a wide array of national content. The station is available on terrestrial television (TMT and GOtv) and on cable and satellite.

== History ==
Mega TV was already broadcasting in June 2020. Mega TV and Multichoice signed an agreement on March 17, 2021, enabling the channel to be available on the Mozambican DStv and GOtv offerings. A reality show became its breakthrough program in that period, which by April 2021 was known for the aggressive behavior of some of its contestants, prompting DJ Júnior to establish new rules to its production.

By July 2021, at the time of the conclusion of its reality show, Mega TV was touted as "the baby who scared Mozambican media giants", over its ability of being on air for only a year and capable of producing a successful program. In August, an intimate video of presenter Tanya Gonçalves leaked on social media, being shown on TV Sucesso's Batidas. On October 12, 2021, it signed a contract with ZAP, enabling its availability to Mozambican subscribers on October 12.

In June 2022, Mega TV hired Mozambican viral internet sensation Narciso Paulo.

After a period of inactivity, Mega TV announced a new reality show in September 2024.
