= Wadi Rajil =

Seasonal stream in eastern Jordan

Wadi Rajil is a seasonal stream (wadi) in the Badia region of eastern Jordan and southern Syria. It originates in the Jabal al-Druze and flows south through the harrat al-Sham into the Azraq oasis. One of the major watercourses in the Azraq basin, it drains much of the northern part of the basaltic harrat al-Sham, which is also known as the harrat al-Rajil.
