= Megalodon (disambiguation) =

Megalodon is an extinct species of giant shark.

Megalodon may also refer to:

== Biology ==
- Megalodon (bivalve), a genus of fossil bivalves
- Brachysuchus megalodon, a phytosaur
- Schistura megalodon, a stone loach; see Schistura
- "Pricesaurus megalodon" a junior synonym of Anhanguera

== Entertainment ==
- Megalodon (2002 film), a 2002 action film
- Megalodon (2018 film), an action horror television film broadcast by Horror Channel
- Shark Attack 3: Megalodon, a 2003 monster film
- Megalodon: The Monster Shark Lives, a 2013 Discovery Channel mockumentary
- Megalodon Collective, Norwegian jazz group
- "Megalodon", a song on the Mastodon album Leviathan
- The Meg, a 2018 science fiction action film loosely based on Steve Alten's 1997 novel Meg: A Novel of Deep Terror.
- The Black Demon, a 2023 thriller film based on the Aztec legend.

== Other uses ==
- A make of modern scuba diving rebreather
- Megalodon (website) (web gyotaku), a web archive site

== See also ==
- Meg (disambiguation)
- Megalodonta, a genus of daisies
- Megalodontesidae, a family of sawflies
  - Megalodontes, a genus within the family
- Megalodontidae, an extinct family of bivalve molluscs
