= Ogre Forest =

Ogre Forest is a 1987 role-playing game supplement published by MEGA Games Ltd. for MEGA Role-Playing System.

== Contents ==
Ogre Forest is a supplement in which two beginner-friendly adventure scenarios are included: "Ogre Forest" and "The Return of Twain Alderyn". It also comes with a gamemaster's screen and six pages of color maps.

== Publication history ==
Ogre Forest was published by MEGA Games Ltd. (UK) in 1988 as a book and a cardstock screen.

== Reviews ==
- Computer and Video Games
