= Samsung Galaxy Mega 2 =

Android smartphone manufactured by Samsung

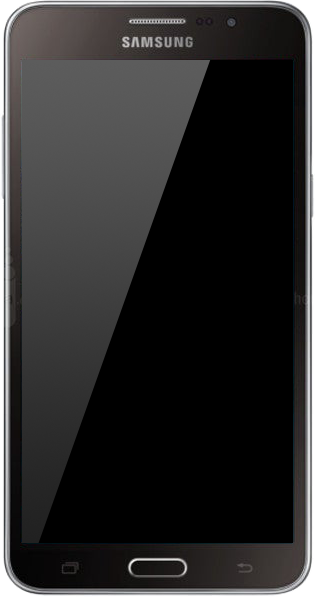
- Brand: Samsung
- Manufacturer: Samsung Electronics
- Type: Phablet
- Series: Samsung Galaxy
- First released: September 2014
- Predecessor: Samsung Galaxy Mega
- Successor: Samsung Galaxy A8 (2015)
- Compatible networks: 2G bands 850 / 900 / 1800 / 1900; 3G bands 850 / 900 / 1900 / 2100; 4G LTE: dependent on device; 1 2 3 4 5 7 17 29 (SM-G750A); 1 3 5 7 8 20 (SM-G750F); 1 3 7 38 39 40 41 (SM-G7508Q)
- Form factor: Slate
- Dimensions: 163.6 mm × 84.9 mm × 8.6 mm (6.44 in × 3.34 in × 0.34 in)
- Weight: 194 g (7 oz)
- Operating system: Original: Android 4.4.2 "KitKat" with TouchWiz; Current: Android 5.1.1 "Lollipop"
- System-on-chip: Exynos 4415 (SM-G750F, SM-G7508Q); Qualcomm MSM8916 Snapdragon 410 (SM-G750A, SM-G750H, SM-G7508)
- CPU: Quad-core 1.5 GHz Cortex-A9 (SM-G750A, SM-G750F, SM-G7508Q); Quad-core 1.2 GHz Cortex-A53 (SM-G750H, SM-G7508)
- GPU: Mali-400 (SM-G750A, SM-G750F, SM-G7508Q); Adreno 306 (SM-G7508, SM-G750H)
- Memory: 1.5 GB RAM
- Storage: Internal Memory: 16GB - 12.69GB Usable (SM-G750A, SM-G750F, SM-G7508Q); 8GB - 4.69GB Usable (SM-G750H, SM-G7508)
- Removable storage: microSDXC (up to 64 GB)
- SIM: micro-SIM: 1 slot (SM-G750A, SM-G750F, SM-G7508); 2 slots (SM-G750H, SM-G7508Q)
- Battery: Li-ion 2,800 mAh
- Rear camera: 8-megapixel rear-facing camera
- Front camera: 2.1-megapixel front-facing camera
- Display: 6.0 in (150 mm) 720p HD Super Clear LCD, 245 ppi
- Connectivity: Wi-Fi 802.11a/b/g/n/, WiFi Direct, Bluetooth 4.0 (BLE), USB 2.0 H/S GPS+ GLONASS
- Model: SM-G750A; SM-G750F; SM-G750H; SM-G7508Q; SM-G7508; SM-G7509; SM-G7509W
- Codename: mega2lteatt (SM-G750A); mega2lte (SM-G750F); vasta3g (SM-G750H); vastalte, vasteltezh (SM-G7508Q); vastalteduosctc (SM-G7509)
- SAR: Head: 0.207 W/Kg 1 g Body: 0.370 W/kg 1 g
- Other: Available in White, Black

The Samsung Galaxy Mega 2 is an Android phablet smartphone manufactured by Samsung, the successor to the Samsung Galaxy Mega. It was released in October 2014.

== Features ==
The Galaxy Mega closely resembles the Galaxy S5, with many similar features. Among its functions are customizable lock screens and quick access to settings via the drop-down notification bar.

The device includes Multi Window functionality (commonly referred to as 'split screen'), enabling users to run multiple applications on a single screen, an ability that is enhanced by the phone's 6.0-inch LCD display.

The display includes Smart Stay, which uses the front-facing cameras to determine if the user is looking at the display, powering off the display if not. The home screen is usable in either portrait or landscape mode. Included in the phone's operating system is Samsung S Voice, a virtual assistant.

== Hardware ==
The Samsung Galaxy Mega 2 has a six-inch display with a resolution of 720 x 1280, a quad core 1.5 GHz processor and an 8-megapixel camera. It has internal storage options of 8 GB or 16 GB (of that, 5.34 or 12 GB respectively are usable), and has dual-SIM capability.

The rear-facing 8-megapixel camera comes with several shooting modes, including:

- HDR (Rich Tone)
- Beauty Face
- Shot and More
- Virtual Tour
- Sound and Shot
- Night Mode
- Panorama

Users can store additional music, photos and videos with up to 64 GB of expandable storage with an external microSD card. A 2,800mAh removable battery should allow the phone to run throughout the day on a single charge. The Galaxy Mega is powered by a quad-core processor with 1.5 GB of RAM.

The motherboard of the Galaxy Mega 2 is similar to that of the Samsung Galaxy S5, with a large sub-board housing the processor, SIM card and microSDXC card readers, front and rear-facing cameras, microphone assembly, and other components, located at the top of the device, connected to a smaller sub-board at the bottom housing the micro-USB port.

== Design ==
The Galaxy Mega 2 measures 6.6 x 3.46 x 0.31 inches and it weighs 7.1 ounces (201.3 grams). It has a traditional IPS LCD screen. The rear of the device is made of a faux leather material.

The Galaxy Mega 2 does not have a unibody design or proprietary screws, which allows it to be disassembled relatively easily using a standard Phillips No. 000 screwdriver for repairs.

== Software ==
The Samsung Galaxy Mega 2 shipped with Android version 4.4.2 skinned with Samsung's TouchWiz interface. Samsung's Multi-window Mode is the front and center feature of the device.

Like other Galaxy phones, the lock screen can be customized with widgets and shortcuts. Seven customizable home screens are available. Eleven quick settings buttons in the notification drawer toggle various device features. These include Wi-Fi connectivity, Sound Mode, Ultra Power Saving, and Power Saving.

The device's final software update came with Android 5.1.1. AT&T continued providing security updates until the last version came on January 20, 2017. However, international versions of the device only received an upgrade to Android 4.4.4, with the final update to this branch occurring on January 22, 2020. Samsung has since removed all the updates from its servers.

== Variants ==
The Mega 2 has many variants, differing mostly in wireless connectivity offerings and region. All devices have a 6.0 inch display and 1.5 GB of RAM.

Those that have dual-SIM capability are known as variants of the Galaxy Mega 2 Duos.

== See also ==
- Samsung Galaxy Mega
- Samsung Galaxy S5
- Samsung Galaxy Note 3
- Samsung Galaxy Tab S
- Samsung Galaxy S5 Mini
- Samsung Galaxy S6
- Samsung Galaxy S6 Edge
