= Meg (disambiguation) =

Meg is a feminine given name.

It may also refer to:

== Entertainment ==
- Meg, sci-fi franchise created by Steve Alten about megalodon sharks
  - Meg: A Novel of Deep Terror, a 1997 science fiction novel by Steve Alten
  - The Meg, a 2018 film based on the Steve Alten novel series
  - Meg 2: The Trench, 2023 science fiction action film and sequel to the 2018 film
- Meg!, a comic strip

== Other uses ==
- Meg (computer), an early British computer developed at Manchester University
- Meg (informal), short for megabyte, a computer term
- Meg (informal), short for Megalodon, an extinct shark
- Meghalaya, a state in northeastern India (postal code MEG)

== See also ==
- Mons Meg, a medieval bombard located at Edinburgh Castle, Scotland
- Megalodon (disambiguation)
- Mega (disambiguation)
- MEG (disambiguation)
