= TV Sucesso (Mozambique) =

Mozambican television channel

- Country: Mozambique
- Broadcast area: Mozambique

Ownership
- Owner: Africa Communications

History
- Launched: December 2014 (experimental); May 2015 (regular)

TV Sucesso is a Mozambican television network owned by Africa Communications, itself owned by noted television presenter Gabriel Júnior. The channel started in 2015 and quickly became one of the most popular channels in the country.

== History ==
TV Sucesso made experimental broadcasts in December 2014 and started regular broadcasts in May 2015.

On October 15, 2017, the channel started airing Moçambique em Concerto, which was previously broadcast by TVM. The program received a leadership certificate on October 29.

The channel announced on March 20, 2018, that it would carry a package of matches of the 2018 FIFA World Cup, following a similar move by Miramar, which at the time wasn't officially confirmed.

On June 29, 2020, the channel premiered Aşk Yeniden and O Hayat Benim. On September 23, 2020, Fred Jossias left TV Sucesso without consent, supposedly to set up his own channel, A Tua TV.

On February 18, 2021, during RTP África's Conversas ao Sul, celebrity and influencer Neyma Nacimo announced that she was preparing a weekly talk show, Noites com Neyma Nacimo.

For its seventh anniversary, TV Sucesso held an anniversary gala, where it was revealed that the channel had become the most watched network in Mozambique. In conjunction, the channel discarded the purple logo it has been using since the start and replaced it with a new version of the eye logo, which was seen with criticism from some viewers over its design. A few days later, on December 2, the logo was retouched.

== Controversies ==
=== Blocking of Bang Entretenimento ===
In September 2017, Gabriel Júnior supposedly blocked artists from Bang Entretenimento to perform in its afternoon show Batidas. Bang's president Bang Soni released a public statement on Instagram, claiming that the group isn't made up of "pirates" and "manipulators".

=== Dispute between TV Miramar and TV Sucesso ===
In March 2018, following a report that aired on TV Miramar's Fala Moçambique critical of Gabriel Júnior, José Xpião of TV Sucesso sent an open letter to José Guerra, the president of the UCKG in Mozambique, the Miramar outlets and Associação Beneficiente Cristã. This came following TV Sucesso's Jornal Principal airing reports critical of the Universal Church of the Kingdom of God, accusing the sect of being "a religious and dumb people's company". Gabriel Júnior formerly attended the UCKG.
