= MEGA Role-Playing System =

Tabletop role-playing game

MEGA Role-Playing System, Fantasy Edition is a Norwegian role-playing game published by MEGA Games Ltd. (U.K.) in 1987.

== Description ==
MEGA Role-Playing System is a fantasy system, translated from a Norwegian design, with a distinctly Norse slant on swords-and-sorcery. The system is "generic", meaning it is not tied to any particular game such as Dungeons & Dragons or Runequest, but can be used in any fantasy setting. The rules cover character creation (including a detailed list of characters' quirks), combat, priestly and wizardly magic, and more.

== Publication history ==
MEGA Role-Playing System was designed by Isy Allon and Ben Brakas and published by MEGA Games Ltd. in 1987 as a 144-page hardcover book. MEGA Games planned to publish further books using the same rules system but in different genres, but the only other publications released were a gamemaster's screen, and an adventure, Ogre Forest.

== Reception ==
In Issue 6 of The Games Machine, John Woods was initially pleased by the quality of the book and the clean layout. But he found the rules laboriously complex, and not well written, commenting, "This is a particularly serious problem in the sections explaining the more complex parts of the rules such as the combat system. What turn out, on careful reading, to be fairly sound and straightforward rules are explained in such a hurried and confusing fashion as to make them almost unintelligible." He concluded on a down note, saying, "All in all the system is exceedingly disappointing, with what I can only describe as a half-finished feel. [...] I really can’t recommend MEGA to anyone."

Stewart Wieck reviewed The MEGA Role-Playing System in White Wolf #18 (Nov./Dec., 1989), rating it a 2 out of 5 and stated that "a few bright spots among the rules cannot dig MEGA out of the 'no background' hole [...] MEGA's setting is stale and offers a gamer little reason to try it out instead of a better supported or more richly developed game."

In his 1990 book The Complete Guide to Role-Playing Games, game critic Rick Swan thought MEGA was very out-dated, writing, "this Norwegian design might have generated some interest if it had been published in the 1970s, but now it's little more than a curious anachronism." Swan did find the character generation system was "moderately interesting", but "The rest of it reads liked warmed-over Dungeons & Dragons." Swan gave the game a poor rating of only 1.5 out of 4.
