= Rockman =

Rockman may refer to:

- Rockman, the Japanese name for the Mega Man franchise
  - Rockman, the Japanese name of Mega Man (character), the titular protagonist of the Mega Man video games
- Alexis Rockman (born 1962), American contemporary artist
- Rockman (amplifier), a brand name of headphone guitar amplifiers and other music technology products
- Rockman Rock, a pseudonym of Jimmy Cauty from electronic music group The KLF
- Rockman (character), an early Marvel Comics hero
- "Rock Man", a song by B'z, a B-side of "Ultra Soul"
- Rock Men, characters in the Conker series
