= The Megas (disambiguation) =

The Megas is a mini-series comic about a future society in an alternate reality.

The Megas may also refer to:

- The Megas (band), a video-game cover music band from California, U.S.
- Los Megas, a former Mexican professional wrestling group

== See also ==
- Megas (disambiguation)
