= Samsung Galaxy Mega =

2013 Android smartphone

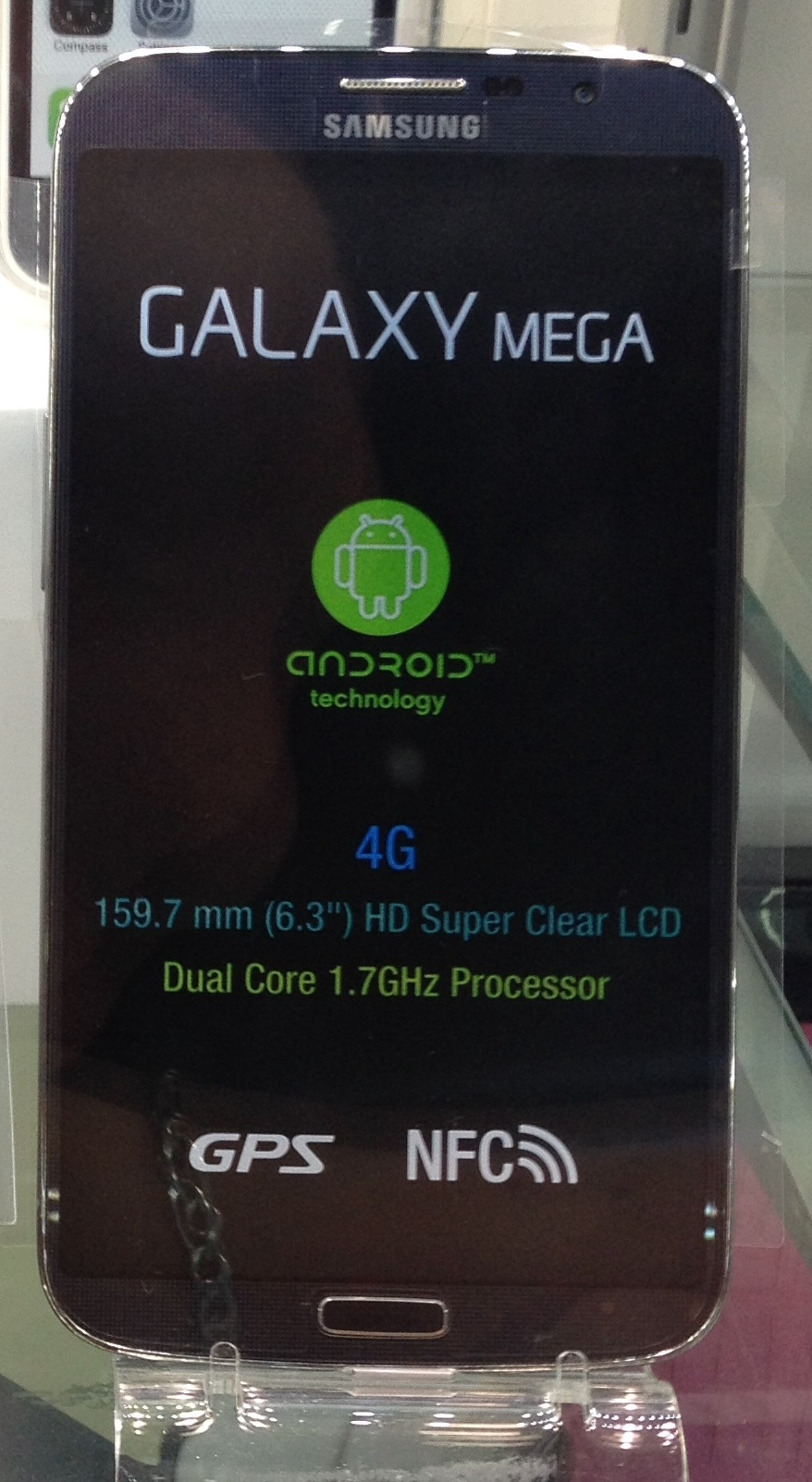
- Samsung Galaxy Mega
- Brand: Samsung
- Manufacturer: Samsung Electronics
- Type: Phablet
- First released: June 2013; 13 years ago
- Successor: Samsung Galaxy Mega 2
- Form factor: Slate
- Dimensions: 167.6 mm × 88 mm × 8.0 mm (6.60 in × 3.46 in × 0.31 in) (6.3 in model); 162.6 mm × 82.4 mm × 9.0 mm (6.40 in × 3.24 in × 0.35 in) (5.8 in model)
- Weight: 199 g (7 oz) (6.3 in); 182 g (5.8 in)
- Operating system: Original: Android 4.2.2 "Jelly Bean" with TouchWiz; Current: Android 4.4.2 "KitKat"
- System-on-chip: Qualcomm Snapdragon 400 (6.3 in); Broadcom (5.8 in)
- CPU: 1.7 GHz Dual core Krait 300 (6.3 in); 1.4 GHz Dual core (5.8 in)
- GPU: Adreno 305 (6.3 in); VideoCore IV (5.8 in)
- Memory: 1.5 GB RAM
- Storage: Internal Memory; 8 GB (5.8 in, usable 5.34 GB); 16 GB (6.3 in, usable 12.0 GB)
- Removable storage: microSDXC (up to 64 GB)
- Battery: Li-ion 3,200 mAh (6.3 in); Li-ion 2,600 mAh (5.8 in)
- Rear camera: Single-Camera Setup; 5.8 in: 8 MP, f/2.7, 1/3.2", 1.4 µm, AF; 6.3 in: Sony IMX 175 or Samsung S5K3H5XA; 8 MP, f/2.6, 28mm (wide), 1/3.2", 1.4 µm, AF; Camera features: 5.8 in: LED flash; 6.3 in: LED flash, HDR, Panorama; Video recording: 1080p@30fps, (stereo sound rec. (Only for the 6.3 in model))
- Front camera: Samsung S5K6A3YX; 1.9 MP
- Display: 6.3 in (160 mm) 720p HD Super Clear LCD, 233 ppi 5.8 in (150 mm) 540p LCD, 190 ppi
- Connectivity: Both: Wi-Fi a/b/g/n/ac, WiFi Direct, BT 4.0 (BLE), USB 2.0 H/S GPS+GLONASS; 6.3 in: NFC, MHL
- SAR: Head: 0.1 W/kg 1 g Body: 0.54 W/kg 1 g Hotspot: 0.99 W/kg 1 g
- Other: Available in White, Black, Plum Purple

The Samsung Galaxy Mega is an Android phablet smartphone that was manufactured and released by Samsung. It was announced on April 11, 2013. There were 2 models released that year, one having a 6.3 in (160 mm) screen, and another with a 5.8 in (150 mm) screen. It has a 1,280×720 screen, a dual-core 1.7 GHz processor and an 8-megapixel camera. The phone runs Android 4.2.2 "Jelly Bean" software, and internal storage is 8 or 16 GB (usable 5.34 or 12 GB respectively).

The Galaxy Mega has received the Android 4.4.2 "KitKat" update. Also available is the unofficial update CyanogenMod 11 Android 4.4.2 update, for the Mega 6.3 (GT-I9200/I9205). The device's successor is the Samsung Galaxy Mega 2.

== Features ==
- Multi-window – Split screen capability
- Home Screen is available in landscape mode
- Group Play – Link with other Galaxy devices to share photos or create surround sound using each device's speaker
- Air View – Hover over areas in supported apps to view on-screen previews. (6.3 model in portrait mode only)
- S Memo – Samsung's note app. Create hand-written notes with your finger, text using the keyboard, and embed audio or images.
- S Voice – Personal assistant and knowledge navigator.
- S Translator – Translator app, with support for nine languages.
- Smart Stay – Uses the front-facing camera to track the user's eyes, and only powers off the display if the user is not looking.
- IR blaster (6.3 model)
- Smart dual SIM (5.8 model)

== Hardware ==
The Galaxy Mega largely resembles the Galaxy S4, and the two share similar features. Users can customize the lock screen and quickly access settings from the drop-down notification bar. Other features include Air View, which allows users to preview emails and photos by hovering a finger an inch above the screen, and WatchON, which lets users control a television with the smartphone. It also includes Multi Window, which allows users to use multiple apps on the same screen, a feature that is enhanced with the phone's 6.3-inch LCD (720 x 1280) display. S Translator provides quick and easy translations, and ChatON lets users share their screens with others.

The rear-facing 8-megapixel camera comes with numerous shooting modes such as Panorama and Sound & Shot. The Story Album feature lends itself to quick photo album creation on the go. The Mega runs Android 4.2.2 Jelly Bean. Users can store additional music, photos and videos with up to 64 GB of expandable storage with an external microSD card. A 3,200-mAh removable battery should allow the phone to run throughout the day on a single charge. The Galaxy Mega is powered by a dual-core 1.7-GHz Qualcomm MSM8930 Snapdragon 400 processor with 1.5GB of RAM.

== Design ==
The Galaxy Mega measures 6.6 x 3.46 x 0.31 inches, and is larger than the Samsung Galaxy Note II (5.9 x 3.2 x 0.37 inches), HTC One (2013) (5.1 ounces, 5.31 x 2.63 x 0.28 inches) and Motorola Moto X (1st generation) (4.8 ounces, 5.1 x 2.6 x 0.22-0.4 inches). It weighs 7.1 ounces.

== Software ==
The Samsung Galaxy Mega runs Android Jelly Bean OS 4.2.2 skinned with Samsung's TouchWiz interface, with features such as multi-window mode. The lock screen can be customized with widgets and shortcuts. Seven customizable home screens are available to the user. 16 quick settings buttons in the notification drawer enable users to toggle features including Wi-Fi connectivity and the proprietary Smart Stay. These buttons can be rearranged by clicking on a tile button in the top right corner of the notification drawer.

Due to its large size, the home screen can be viewed horizontally.

Since 2014, the Galaxy Mega has been updated to Android 4.4.2 Kitkat.

== Variants ==
- GT-I9150 - 5.8-inch screen, 1.4 GHz CPU, 1.5 GB RAM, 8 GB built-in storage - no LTE support - no dual SIM support
- GT-I9152 - 5.8-inch screen, 1.4 GHz CPU, 1.5 GB RAM, 8 GB built-in storage - no LTE support - dual SIM support
- GT-I9200 - 6.3-inch screen, 1.7 GHz CPU, 1.5 GB RAM, 8 GB or 16 GB built-in storage - no LTE support - no dual SIM support
- GT-I9205 - 6.3-inch screen, 1.7 GHz CPU, 1.5 GB RAM, 8 GB or 16 GB built-in storage - LTE support - no dual SIM support

Only the GT-I9152 has dual SIM support. Only the GT-I9205 has LTE support (i.e. 4G-LTE support) and no FM Radio. The AT&T version of the GT-I9205 is known as the SGH-i527.

== Gallery ==
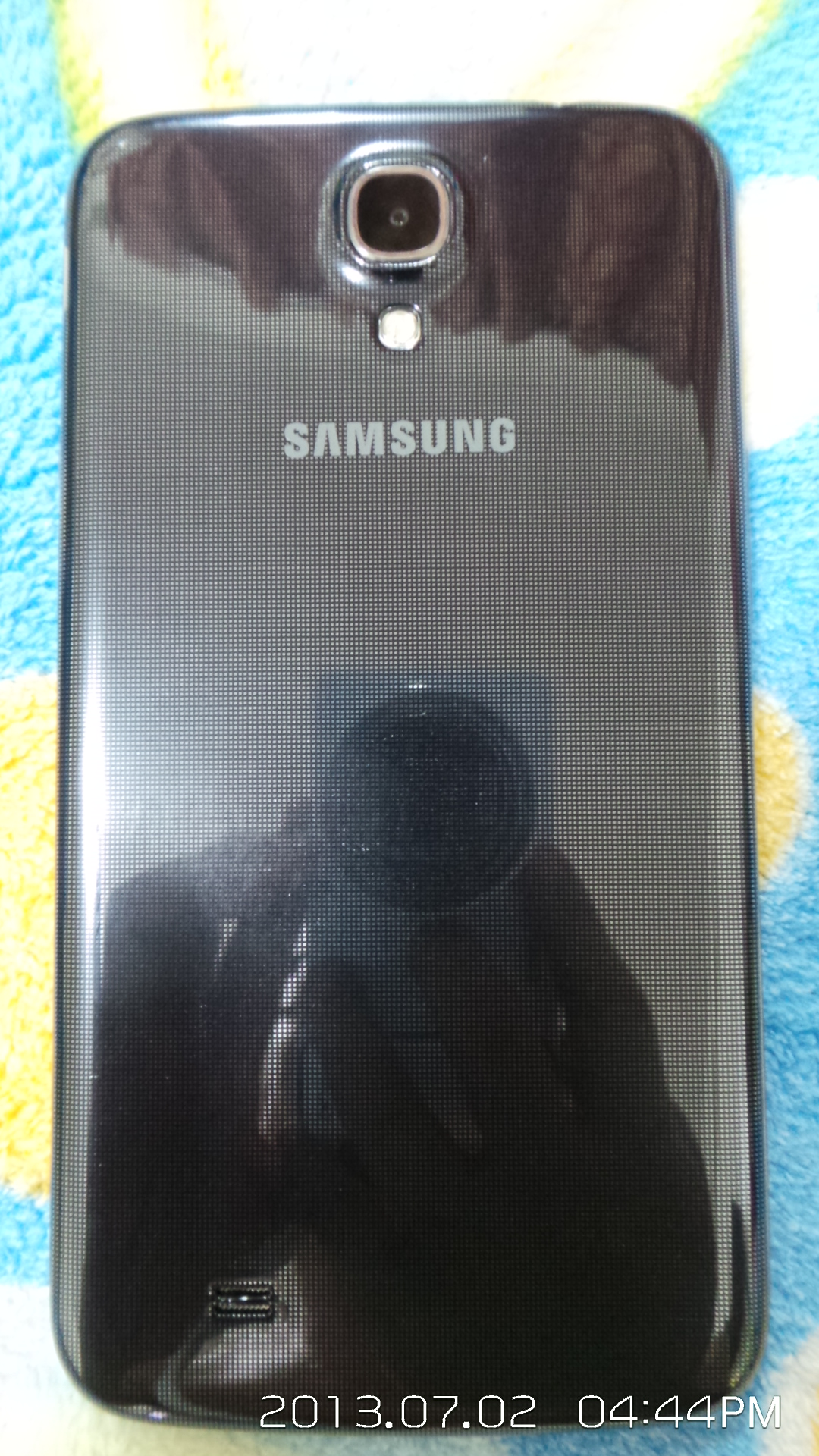
Samsung Galaxy Mega 6.3 back

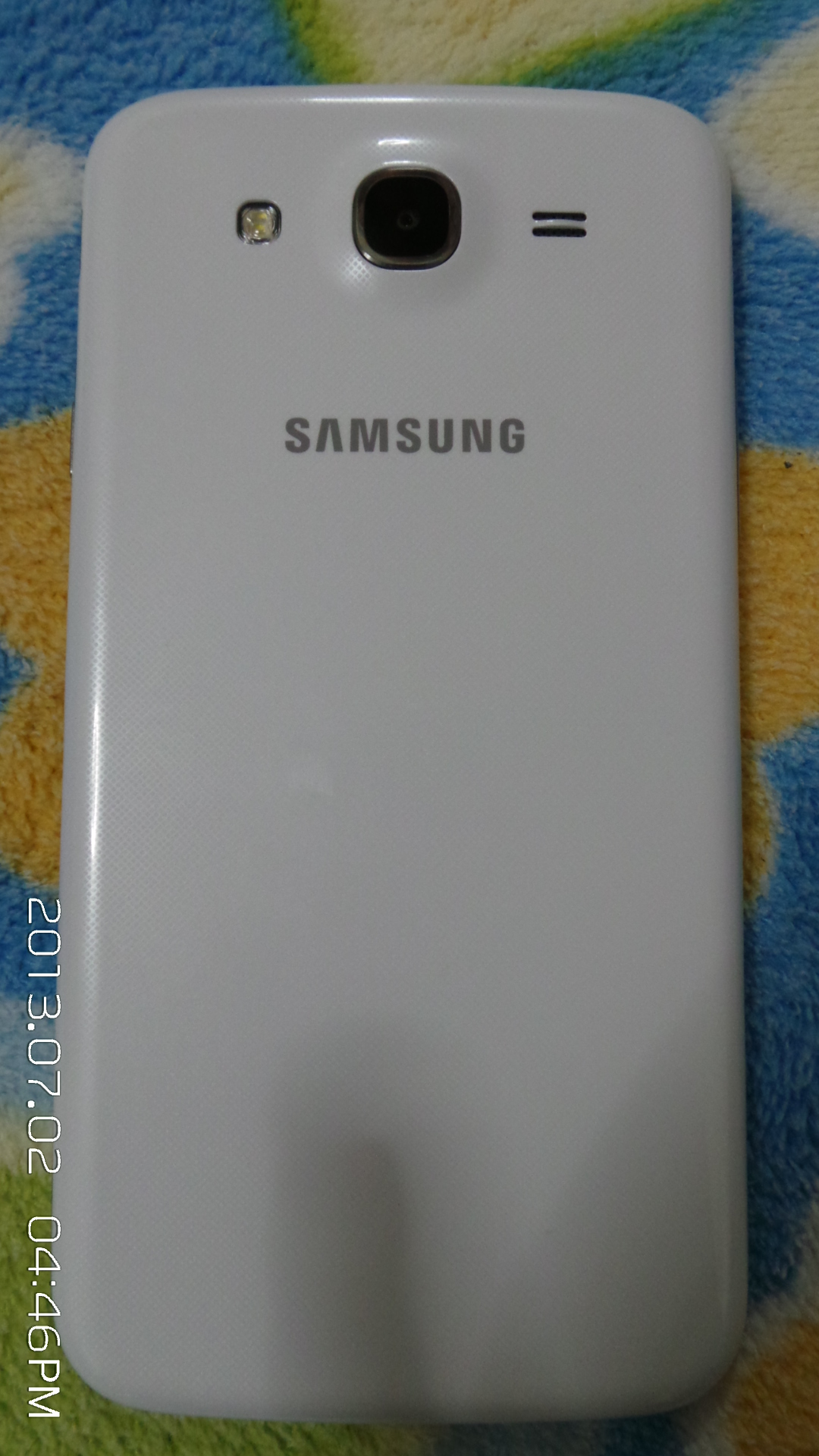
Samsung Galaxy Mega 5.8 back

== See also ==
- Samsung Galaxy S4
- Samsung Galaxy Note II
- Samsung Galaxy Note 3
- Samsung Galaxy Note 8.0
- Samsung Galaxy Tab 3 8.0
