= Megabus =

Megabus may refer to:

- Megabus (Europe), a low-cost coach service with services in Europe owned by ComfortDelGro.
- Megabus (North America), a low-cost bus service in the United States and Canada owned by Variant Equity Advisors.
- Megabús, a bus rapid transit system in Pereira, Colombia.
