= Al-Safa (Syria) =

Hilly region in southern Syria

- Volcanic field
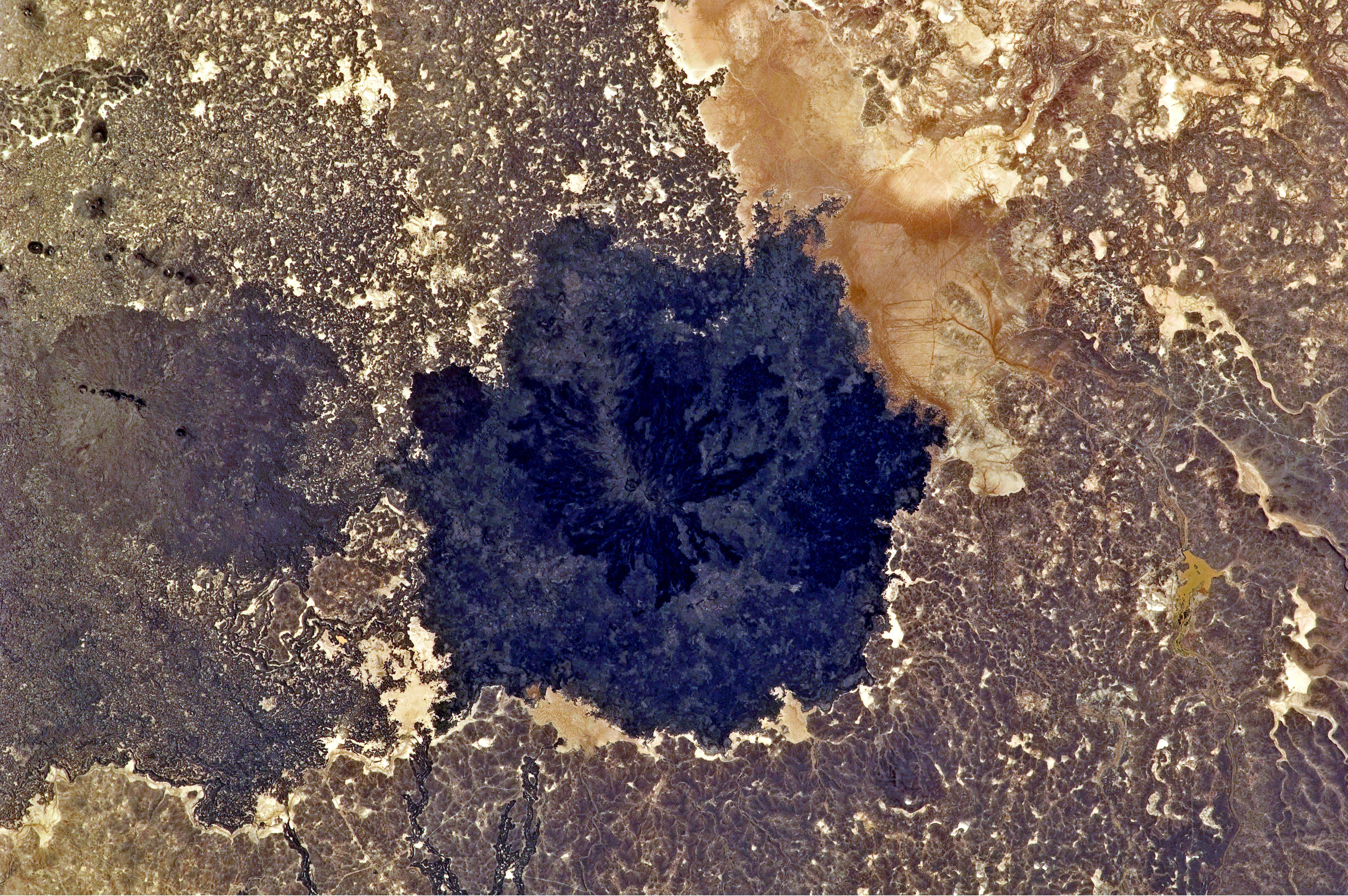
- Es Safa basaltic volcanic field

- Location in Syria
- Coordinates: 33°02′10″N 37°11′53″E
- Location: Suwayda Governorate, Syria
- Age: Holocene
- Geology: Basaltic lava field
- Volcanic field: Harrat Ash Shamah
- Last eruption: mid-19th century

As-Safa (Arabic: الصفا, Aṣ-Ṣafā), also known as Tulul al-Safa (تلول الصفا, Tulūl Eṣ-Ṣafā), Arabic for Al-Safa hills, is a hilly region which lies in southern Syria, north-east of Jabal al-Druze volcanic plateau. It consists of a basaltic lava field of volcanic origin, covering an area of 220 square kilometres, and contains at least 38 cinder cones. This volcanic field lies within the northern part of the massive alkaline Harrat Ash Shamah volcanic field that extends from southern Syria, through eastern Jordan to Saudi Arabia. The region is extremely scarce in water.

In 1857, archaeologists discovered inscriptions in a previously unknown writing system in As-Safa. This script, Safaitic, was named after As-Safa, even though it is now also attested in other locations.

== Volcanic activities ==
The field contains numerous vents which have been active during the Holocene Epoch (12,000 years ago). A boiling lava lake was observed in the Es Safa volcanic area in the middle of the 19th century (see Erta Ale in Ethiopia and Puʻu ʻŌʻō in Hawaii for reference).

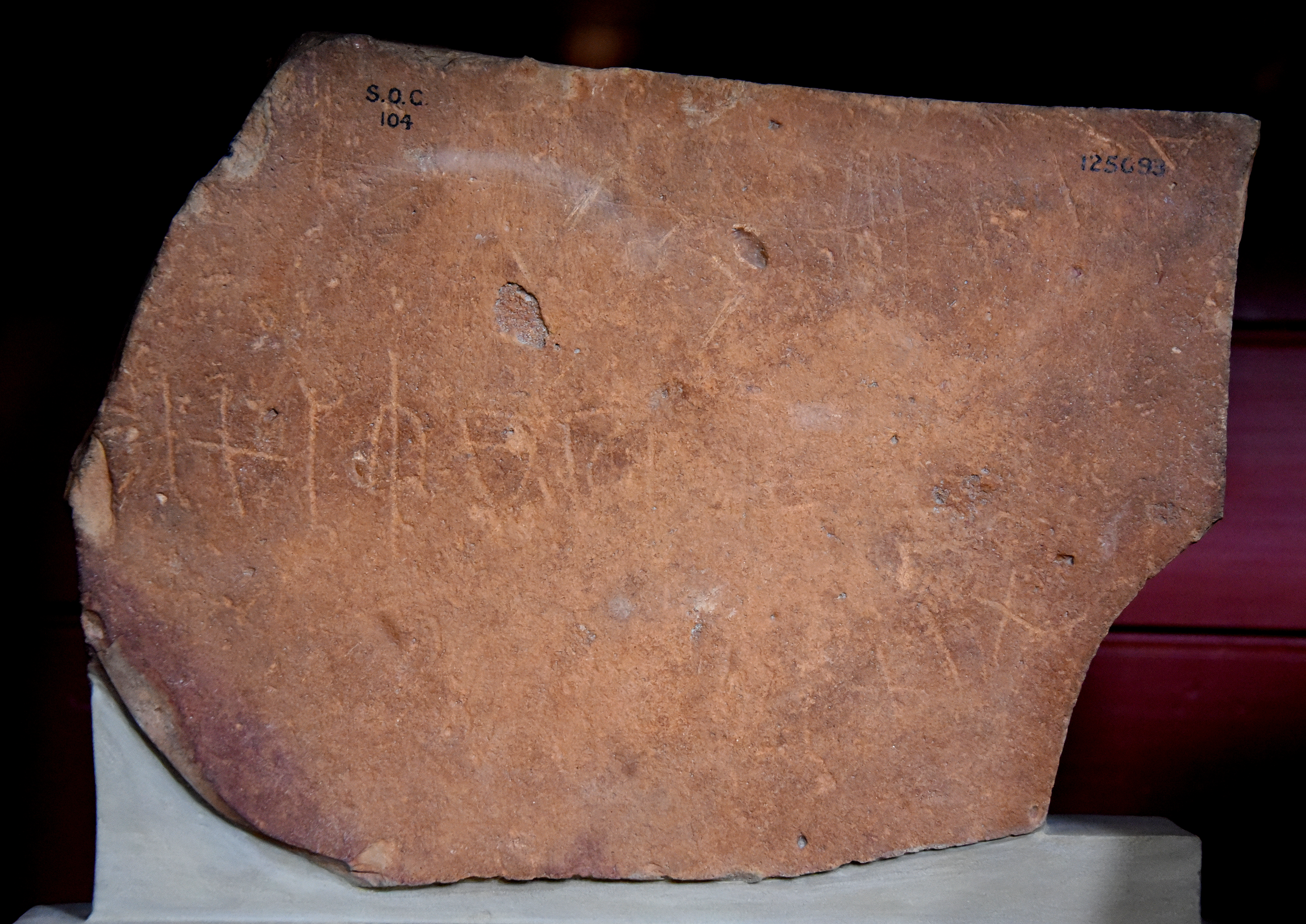
Safaitic script with a figure of a camel on a red sandstone fragment, from al-Safa, currently housed in the British Museum

== Demography ==
The region was frequently used by the Druze through history as a refuge in the years of war. The whole region currently lies within Suwayda Governorate, as the governorate's borders run along the region's boundaries. Only roaming Bedouins visit it occasionally, in addition to some archaeologists.

== Syrian civil war ==
In the Syrian civil war, al-Safa became the last pocket of ISIL in the Suwayda Governorate and the Rif-Damasiq Governorate. It was surrounded by the Syrian Army in the Suwayda offensive. The area was recaptured by Syrian government forces on 17 November 2018.

== List of volcanic cones in Es Safa ==
- Tell el Aqzass (Tell el Aqzass) 889 m.
- Tell ed Ders (Tell ed Ders) 878 m.
- Jabal Rghēli (Jabal Rgheli) 874 m.
- Tell Darayir Šimāli (Tell Darayer Shimali) 844 m.
- Tell Um Ħwār (Tell Um Hwar) 818 m.
- Tell Um el Janbrīs (Tell Um el Janbris) 808 m.
- Tell Darayir Qebli (Tell Darayir Qebli) 803 m.
- Tell ‘Ali (Tell Ali) 770 m.
- Tell al Khēl (Tell el Kheil) 765 m.
- Tell Eş Şafa (Tell Es Safa) 739m.
- Tell Ţarrān (Tell Tarran) 731 m.
- Jabal Sīs (Jabal Sees) 692 m.
- Tell Zqēţa (Tell Zqeita) 670 m.
- Jabal el Jarīn (Jabal el Jareen) 657 m.
- Jabal Abū Ghanem (Jabal Abu Ghanem) 632 m.

== See also ==
- Himaitic
- Late antique Syria
- Paleo-Arabic
- Pre-Islamic Arabian inscriptions
