= Middle Eastern Geodatabase for Antiquities =

The Middle Eastern Geodatabase for Antiquities (MEGA) is a web based geographic information system or GIS developed by the Getty Conservation Institute (GCI), with matching funds from the World Monuments Fund (WMF) and in partnership with the Jordanian Department of Antiquities (DoA). The GIS will serve as the primary tool for the Jordanian DoA in its ongoing work to inventory, monitor, and manage Jordan's vast number of archaeological sites.

== The system ==
MEGA–Jordan is, at its core, an electronic inventory capable of maintaining information on site location and extent, site characteristics, and site condition in an easy-to-use manner. Ultimately it will help standardize and centralize information on archaeological sites throughout the country in a single system focused primarily on the aims of heritage management and research. MEGA–Jordan will become the DoA's preeminent planning and decision-making tool, addressing its needs and demands related to the legal protection of sites, site management, infrastructure and development control, World Heritage requirements, and development of national and regional research strategies. Infrastructure and development planning are especially crucial, and the GIS will permit the DoA to assess the potential impact of development projects (e.g., construction of buildings, roadways, pipelines) on or near archaeological sites. MEGA–Jordan is also seen as a tool for coordinating archaeological site data with Jordanian government ministries (e.g., Tourism and Antiquities, Planning, Agriculture) and for academic research.

The system offers various levels of user access based on user roles—i.e., some users will have full access to all data and the ability to add and edit sites and their attributes, approve new sites, run administrative reports, and export data, while others may only have access to search and view the data.

== Awards ==
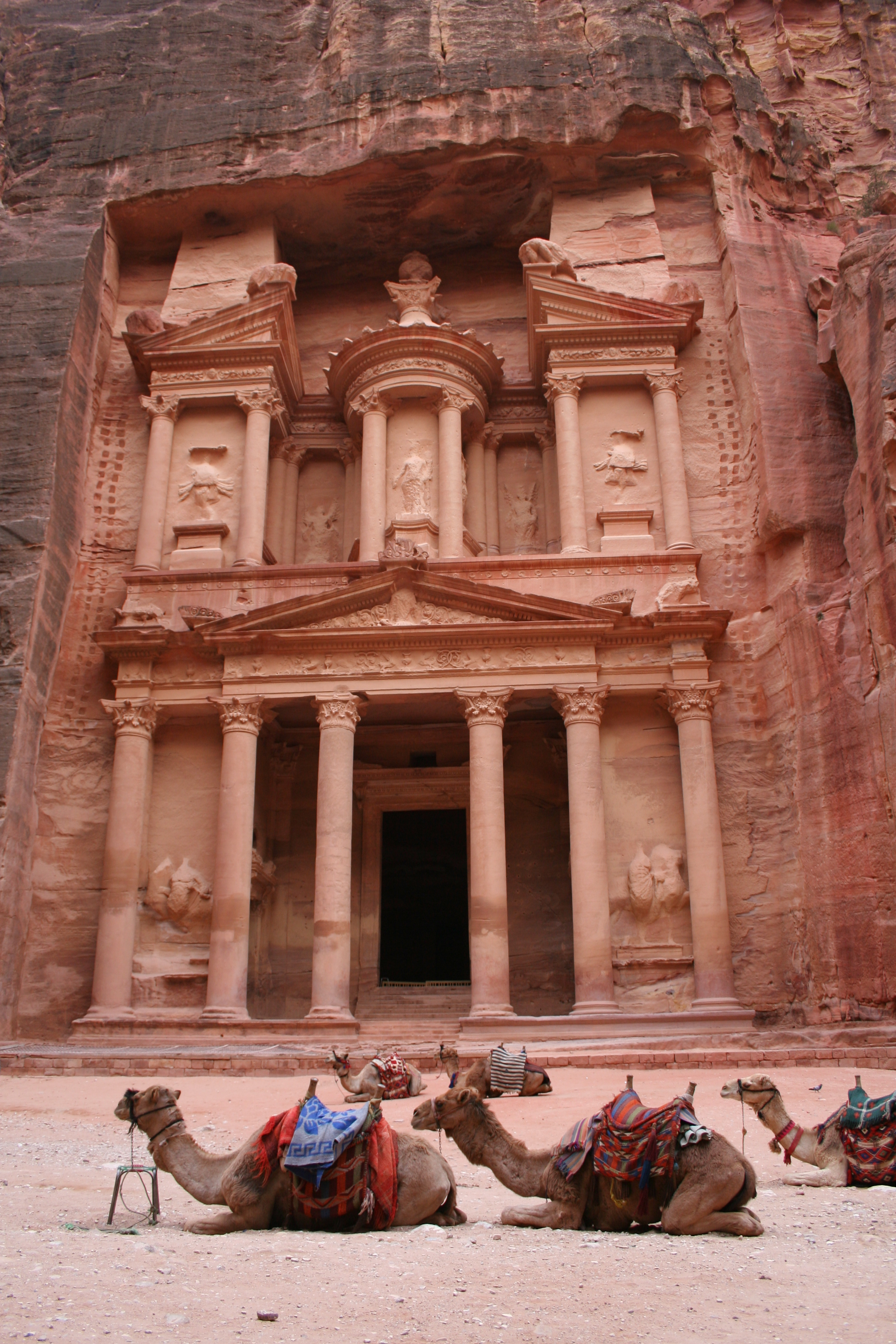
The most iconic image of an archaeological site in Jordan is likely that of Al-Khazneh (Arabic for 'treasury') of Petra, which was elaborately carved into a sandstone cliff between approximately 100 AD and 200 BC. Its name is a misnomer, as the facade's extensive funerary symbols suggest that it was constructed as a tomb.

The MEGA system was selected as "one of the 100 most significant innovations of 2010" by Netexplorateur:

== See also ==
- Architectural conservation
- Cultural heritage management
- GIS in archaeology
- Historic preservation
