= Samsung Galaxy A20 =

2019 smartphone from Samsung

Samsung Galaxy A20 Samsung Galaxy A20e Samsung Galaxy A20s
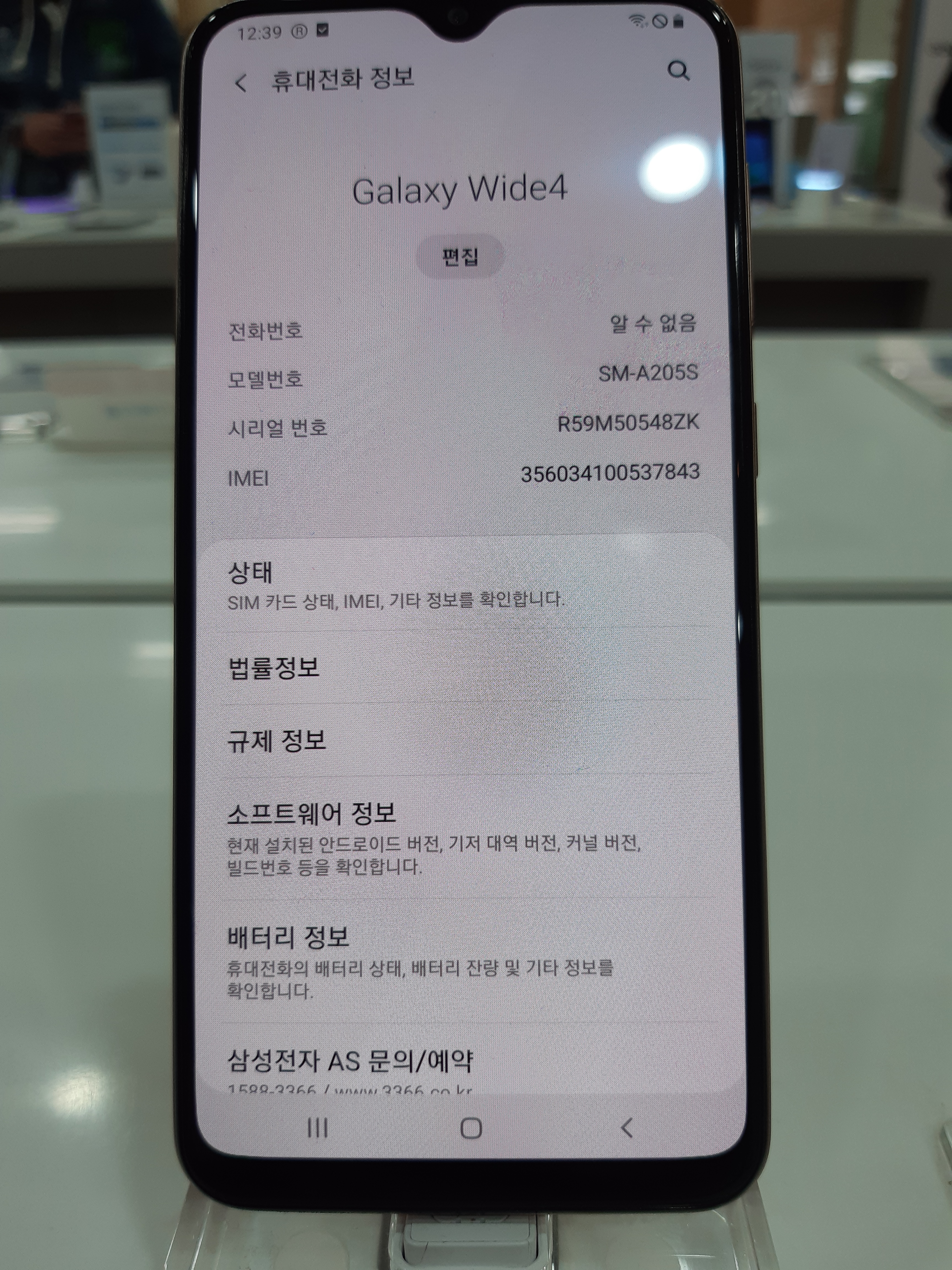
- Samsung Galaxy A20 on display in South Korea
- Brand: Samsung
- Manufacturer: Samsung Electronics
- Type: Smartphone
- Series: Galaxy A
- Family: Samsung Galaxy
- First released: A20: March 19, 2019; 7 years ago A20e: April 10, 2019; 7 years ago A20s: September 23, 2019; 7 years ago
- Discontinued: January 16, 2023; 3 years ago
- Predecessor: Samsung Galaxy J6; Samsung Galaxy A6; Samsung Galaxy J7 (2018) (for Wide4)
- Successor: Samsung Galaxy A21; Samsung Galaxy A21s; Samsung Galaxy F42 5G (for Wide4)
- Related: Samsung Galaxy M20; Samsung Galaxy A10; Samsung Galaxy A10s; Samsung Galaxy A30; Samsung Galaxy A40; Samsung Galaxy A50; Samsung Galaxy A60; Samsung Galaxy A70; Samsung Galaxy A80; Samsung Galaxy A90 5G
- Compatible networks: List: 2G bands: GSM 850 / 900 / 1800 / 1900; 3G bands: HSDPA 850 / 900 / 1700(AWS) / 1900 / 2100; 4G bands (LTE): 1, 2, 3, 5, 7, 8, 20, 28, 34, 38, 39, 40, 41
- Form factor: Slate
- Dimensions: A20: 158.4 mm (6.24 in) H 74.7 mm (2.94 in) W 7.8 mm (0.31 in) D A20e: 147.4 mm (5.80 in) H 69.7 mm (2.74 in) W 8.4 mm (0.33 in) D A20s: 163.3 mm (6.43 in) H 77.5 mm (3.05 in) W 8 mm (0.31 in) D
- Weight: A20: 169 g (6.0 oz); A20e: 141 g (5.0 oz); A20s: 183 g (6.5 oz)
- Operating system: Original: Android 9 "Pie" with One UI 1.1; Current: Android 11 with One UI 3.1
- System-on-chip: A20e & A20: Samsung Exynos 7 Octa 7884; A20s: Qualcomm Snapdragon 450
- CPU: A20e & A20: Octa-core (2x1.6 GHz Cortex-A73 & 6x1.35 GHz Cortex-A53); A20s: Octa-core (8x1.8 GHz Cortex-A53)
- GPU: A20e & A20: Mali-G71 MP2; A20s: Adreno 506
- Memory: 3, 4 GB RAM
- Storage: 32, 64 GB
- Removable storage: MicroSD, up to 512GB
- Battery: A20e: Li-Po 3000 mAh, non-removable A20 & A20s: Li-Po 4000 mAh, non-removable
- Charging: 15W Fast charging
- Rear camera: A20e and A20: Primary: 13 MP, f/1.9, 28mm, 1/3.1", 1.12µm, AF; Ultrawide: 5 MP, f/2.2, 12mm, 1/5.0", 1.12µm; LED flash, panorama, HDR; 1080p@30/60fps; A20s: Primary: 13 MP, f/1.8, 28mm, 1/3.1", 1.12µm, AF; Ultrawide: 8 MP, f/2.2, 13mm, 1/4.0", 1.12µm; Depth: 5 MP, f/2.2; LED flash, panorama, HDR; 1080p@30/60fps
- Front camera: 8 MP, f/2.0, 26mm (wide), 1/4.0", 1.12µm; 1080p@30fps
- Sound: Loudspeaker, 3.5mm audio jack
- Connectivity: 4G LTE Dual Sim
- Model: SM-A202x (A20e); SM-A205x (A20); SM-A207x (A20s) (last letter varies by carrier and international models)
- Codename: samsung-a20
- SAR: 0.23 W/kg (head); 1.38 W/kg (body)

The Samsung Galaxy A20, Galaxy A20e, and the Galaxy A20s are mid-range Android-based smartphones developed and marketed by Samsung Electronics, as part of the Galaxy A series.

The Galaxy A20 was unveiled on 19 March 2019, followed by the Galaxy A20e on 10 April 2019, and the Galaxy A20s on 23 September 2019. The Galaxy A20e and Galaxy A20 was sold in South Korea as the Galaxy Jean2 and the Galaxy Wide4, respectively, on 4 June 2019.

Although the Galaxy A20 variant sold in Japan is marketed simply as the Galaxy A20, its specifications are nearly identical to that of the Galaxy A10e, which was released on 1 November 2019.

== Specifications ==
=== Design ===
All three devices feature the same plastic build and a glass front (with Corning Gorilla Glass 3 for the A20 only).

| Galaxy A20e | Galaxy A20 | Galaxy A20s |
|---|---|---|
| Black; White; Deep Blue; Coral | Black; Red; Deep Blue; Coral; Gold | Black; Red; Blue; Green |

=== Hardware ===
Connectivity options include dual nano-SIM support, 4G LTE, Wi-Fi b/g/n, Bluetooth 5.0, GPS, NFC (depending on region), and FM radio. Sensors include a rear-mounted fingerprint sensor, accelerometer, gyroscope, proximity, and compass.

==== Display ====
All three devices feature an HD+ (720 x 1560) resolution (with an aspect ratio of 19.5:9) and an Infinity-V notch. The only differences are its screen sizes and the display type used: the smaller A20e features a 5.8-inch PLS LCD, the base A20 features a 6.4-inch SuperAMOLED display, while the larger A20s features a 6.5-inch IPS LCD.

==== Battery ====
The A20 and A20s features a 4000mAh non-removable battery, while the A20e features a 3000mAh non-removable battery. Regardless of its battery capacity, all devices support 15W Fast Charging.

==== Processor and memory ====
The A20e and A20 are powered by the Exynos 7884 chipset with an octa-core CPU, while the A20s is powered by the Qualcomm Snapdragon 450 chipset. The A20e and A20 are available exclusively with 3 GB of RAM and 32 GB of internal storage. The A20s offers those same configuration, plus an additional option of 4 GB of RAM and 64 GB of storage.

All three devices uses eMMC for its internal storage and has expandable storage up to 512 GB via a dedicated microSD card slot.

==== Camera ====
The three devices feature a 13 MP primary sensor (f/1.9 for A20e and A20; f/1.8 for A20s) and 5 MP (f/2.2) ultra-wide sensor (8 MP for A20s). An additional 5 MP (f/2.2) depth sensor is included for the A20s. The front camera for the three devices is 8 MP (f/2.0), capable of 1080p video.

=== Software ===
The first two devices have Android 9 Pie with One UI Core 1.1 pre-installed while the refreshed variant (with the "s" suffix) has One UI Core 1.5 pre-installed. They were eligible for 2 OS upgrades and 4 years of security updates.

| | Pre-installed OS | OS Upgrades history | | End of support |
| | Pre-installed OS | 1st | 2nd | End of support |
|---|---|---|---|---|
| A20 | Android 9 Pie (One UI Core 1.1) | Android 10 (One UI Core 2.0); April 2020 | Android 11 (One UI Core 3.1); June 2021 | May 2023 |
| A20e; Galaxy Jean2 | Android 9 Pie (One UI Core 1.1) | Android 10 (One UI Core 2.0); April 2020 | Android 11 (One UI Core 3.1); June 2021 | May 2023 |
| A20s; Galaxy Wide4 | Android 9 Pie (One UI Core 1.5) | Android 10 (One UI Core 2.0); May 2020 | Android 11 (One UI Core 3.1); July 2021 | May 2023 |
