= Samsung Galaxy A10e =

Samsung Galaxy smartphone

- Brand: Samsung
- Manufacturer: Samsung Electronics
- Series: Galaxy A series
- First released: August 2019
- Successor: Samsung Galaxy A01; Samsung Galaxy A11
- Related: Samsung Galaxy A10; Samsung Galaxy A10s
- Dimensions: 147.3 mm (5.80 in) H 69.6 mm (2.74 in) W 8.4 mm (0.33 in) D
- Weight: 141 g (5.0 oz)
- Operating system: Original: Android 9 Pie with One UI 1.1; Last: Android 11 with One UI 3.1
- System-on-chip: Exynos 7884 (14 nm)
- CPU: Octa-core (2x1.6 GHz Cortex-A73 & 6x1.35 GHz Cortex-A53)
- GPU: Mali-G71 MP2
- Memory: 2 GB or 3 GB RAM
- Storage: 32 GB internal storage
- Removable storage: microSD (Up to 512GB)
- Battery: 3000mAh
- Charging: 5W
- Rear camera: 8 MP or 5 MP
- Front camera: 5 MP or 2 MP
- Display: 5.83 in HD+ PLS TFT LCD (720x1560 resolution)
- Connectivity: USB-C
- Model: SM-A102Ux (last letter varies by carrier and international models)
- SAR: 0.47 W/kg (head); 0.54 W/kg (body)
- Website: www.samsung.com/us/support/mobile/phones/galaxy-a/galaxy-a10e/

Samsung Galaxy A10e is an Android Smartphone manufactured by Samsung Electronics as a cheaper variant of the Samsung Galaxy A10. It was announced in July 2019 and released in August 2019. It comes with Android 9 (Pie) with Samsung's first version of One UI.

== Specifications ==
=== Hardware ===
The Samsung Galaxy A10e is equipped with a 5.83-inch PLS TFT capacitive touchscreen with a resolution of 720x1560 (~295 ppi). The phone itself measures 147.3 mm × 69.6 mm × 8.4 mm (5.80 in × 2.74 in × 0.33 in) and weighs 141 grams (5.0 oz). It is powered by Samsung's in-house Exynos 7884 SoC with an octa-core (2x1.6 GHz Cortex-A73 & 6x1.35 GHz Cortex-A53) CPU and a Mali-G71 MP2 GPU. It comes with 32 GB of Internal storage which is expandable up to 512 GB via MicroSD card slot and 2 GB or 3 GB RAM (depending on the model). The phone has a non-removable 3000 mAh battery.

=== Software ===
The Samsung Galaxy A10e comes with One UI 1.1 over Android 9 (Pie), upgradable to One UI 3.1 over Android 11.
