= Samsung Galaxy A52 =

2021 mid-range smartphone by Samsung Electronics

Samsung Galaxy A52 Samsung Galaxy A52 5G Samsung Galaxy A52s 5G

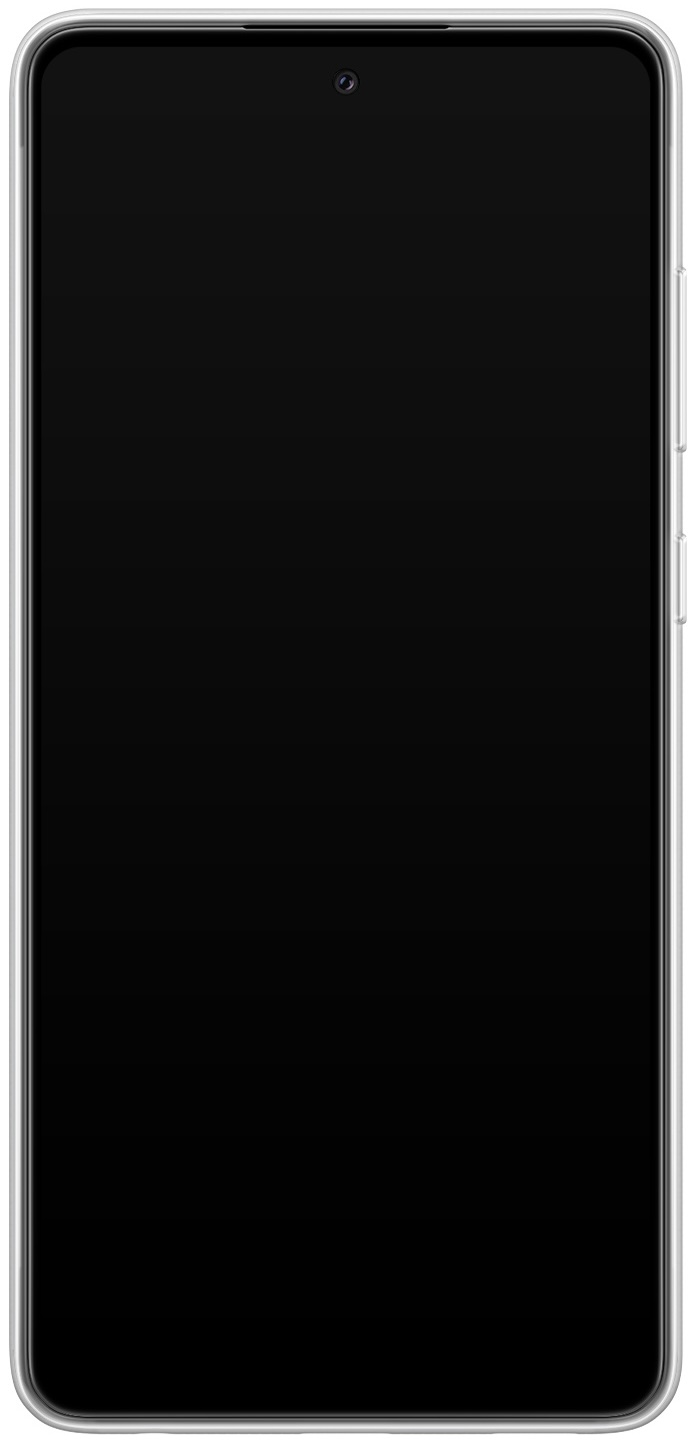
- Galaxy A52 in Awesome White
- Brand: Samsung
- Manufacturer: Samsung Electronics
- Type: Smartphone
- Series: Galaxy A
- Family: Samsung Galaxy
- First released: March 17, 2021; 5 years ago
- Availability by region: 4G: March 26, 2021; 5 years ago 5G: March 19, 2021; 5 years ago 5G "s" model: September 1, 2021; 5 years ago
- Predecessor: Samsung Galaxy A51
- Successor: Samsung Galaxy A53 5G
- Related: Samsung Galaxy A22; Samsung Galaxy A32; Samsung Galaxy A72
- Compatible networks: 2G / 3G / 4G; 5G (for A52 5G & A52s 5G)
- Form factor: Slate
- Dimensions: 159.9 mm (6.30 in) H 75.1 mm (2.96 in) W 8.4 mm (0.33 in) D
- Weight: 189 g (6.7 oz)
- Operating system: Original: Android 11 with One UI 3.1; Current: Android 14 with One UI 6.1
- System-on-chip: 4G: Qualcomm Snapdragon 720G (8 nm); 5G: Qualcomm Snapdragon 750G 5G (8 nm); 5G "s" model: Qualcomm Snapdragon 778G 5G (6 nm)
- CPU: 4G: Octa-core (2x2.3 GHz Kryo 465 Gold & 6x1.8 GHz Kryo 465 Silver); 5G: Octa-core (2x2.2 GHz Kryo 570 & 6x1.8 GHz Kryo 570); 5G "s" model: Octa-core (4x2.4 GHz Kryo 670 & 4x1.9 GHz Kryo 670)
- GPU: 4G: Adreno 618; 5G: Adreno 619; 5G "s" model: Adreno 642L
- Memory: 4 GB, 6 GB or 8 GB RAM
- Storage: 128 GB or 256 GB UFS 2.1
- Removable storage: microSD, up to 1 TB
- Battery: 4500 mAh lithium-polymer
- Charging: 25 W Fast-charging
- Rear camera: Quad-Camera Setup; Primary: Sony IMX 682; 64 MP, f/1.8, 25mm, FoV 83°, 1/1.73", 0.8 µm, PDAF, OIS; Ultrawide: Samsung ISOCELL (S5K)3L6; 12 MP, f/2.2, 13mm, FoV 116.3°, 1/3.0", 1.12 µm, FF; Macro: GalaxyCore GC5035; 5 MP, f/2.4, 25mm, 1/5.0", 1.12 µm, FF; Depth: GalaxyCore GC5035; 5 MP, f/2.4, 1/5.0", 1.12 µm; Camera features: LED flash, Panorama, HDR; Video recording: 4K@30fps, 1080p@30/60fps, 720p@30fps; gyro-EIS
- Front camera: Sony IMX 616; 32 MP, f/2.2, 25mm (wide), FoV 80.5°, 1/2.76", 0.8 µm, FF; Camera features: HDR; Video recording: 4K@30fps, 1080p@30/60fps, 720p@30fps
- Display: 6.5 in (170 mm) Super AMOLED, 1080 × 2400, 20:9 ratio, ~84.9% screen-to-body ratio, ~405 ppi, 800 nits peak brightness 4G: 90 Hz refresh rate 5G/5G "s" model: 120 Hz refresh rate
- Sound: Loudspeaker (stereo); 3.5mm Audio jack
- Connectivity: USB-C
- Water resistance: IP67
- Model: International models: SM-A525x (4G); SM-A526x (5G); SM-A528x (5G "s" model) (last letter varies by carrier and international models); Japanese model: SC-53B (NTT Docomo, 5G)

The Samsung Galaxy A52 is a mid-range Android-based smartphone manufactured, developed and produced by Samsung Electronics as part of its Galaxy A series. It was announced on 17 March 2021 at the Samsung's virtual Awesome Unpacked event alongside the Galaxy A72. An upgraded variant of the 5G version, Galaxy A52s, was first released in August 2021.

The phone serves as a successor of the Galaxy A51. It is similar to its predecessor but features an upgraded 64 MP main camera, a larger-capacity 4500 mAh battery, and IP67 water- and dust-resistant design.

== Specifications ==
=== Design ===
The Galaxy A52 has a similar design to its predecessor, the Galaxy A51. It has an Infinity-O display with a selfie camera cutout and slim bezels, just like the A51. Unlike the A51, the A52 has matte color options rather than glossy gradient finishes.

The display is protected by Corning Gorilla Glass 5 while the frame and back panel are made of plastic. Both the LTE and 5G (including the 5G "s") variants share the same design and have IP67 water- and dust-resistance.

Galaxy A52 (LTE/5G)	Galaxy A52s
Awesome Violet; Awesome Blue; Awesome White; Awesome Black	Awesome Violet; Awesome Mint; Awesome White; Awesome Black

=== Hardware ===
==== Display ====
All variants feature 6.5-inch Super AMOLED display with 800 nits maximum brightness, 20:9 aspect ratio, 1080×2400 pixels resolution, 411 PPI pixel density and ~84.1% screen-body ratio; however, the display refresh rate differs on all models: the LTE variant has a 90 Hz refresh rate while the 5G/5G "s" variant have a 120 Hz refresh rate.

==== Cameras ====
All variants feature a quad-rear camera setup with a 64 MP main camera with optical image stabilization (OIS), a 12 MP ultrawide-angle camera, a 5 MP depth camera, and a 5 MP depth sensor. The camera is able to take video up to 4K@30fps, and 1080p@60fps.

==== Battery ====
All variants have a 4500 mAh battery with 25W fast charging support; however, a 15W charger is included in the box, and users need to buy the 25W charger separately.

==== Processor and memory ====
The LTE variant is powered by Qualcomm Snapdragon 720G processor, the 5G variant on the other hand is powered by Qualcomm Snapdragon 750G processor. The 5G "s" variant uses the Qualcomm Snapdragon 778G 5G processor. All variants come with 6 or 8 GB of RAM and storage options come with 128 or 256 GB (all models and storage variants use UFS 2.1). It continues to have support for microSD cards.

==== Others ====
The device includes a 3.5 mm Audio jack (the last A5x model to include it) and uses the top earpieces and the bottom speaker to deliver stereo sound. It also features an under-the-screen optical fingerprint scanner.

=== Software ===
All variants ship with Android 11 and One UI 3.1, and are eligible for 3 OS upgrades and 4 years of security updates which were previously introduced on the A90.

	Pre-installed OS	OS Upgrades history			End of support
	Pre-installed OS	1st	2nd	3rd	End of support
A52 LTE	Android 11 (One UI 3.1)	Android 12 (One UI 4.0); January 2022	Android 13 (One UI 5.0); November 2022 (One UI 5.1); March 2023	Android 14 (One UI 6.0); December 2023/January 2024 (One UI 6.1); May 2024	April 2025
A52 5G	Android 11 (One UI 3.1)	Android 12 (One UI 4.0); January 2022	Android 13 (One UI 5.0); November 2022 (One UI 5.1); March 2023	Android 14 (One UI 6.0); December 2023/January 2024 (One UI 6.1); May 2024	April 2025
A52s 5G	Android 11 (One UI 3.1)	Android 12 (One UI 4.0); January 2022	Android 13 (One UI 5.0); November 2022 (One UI 5.1); March 2023	Android 14 (One UI 6.0); December 2023 (One UI 6.1); May 2024	October 2025
