= Samsung Galaxy A20s =

Samsung smartphone

- Brand: Samsung
- Developer: Samsung
- Manufacturer: Samsung Electronics
- Type: Smartphone
- Series: Samsung Galaxy A Series
- First released: October 5th, 2019
- Predecessor: Samsung Galaxy A20
- Successor: Samsung Galaxy A21; Samsung Galaxy A21s
- Related: Samsung Galaxy A22
- Compatible networks: 2G, 3G, 4G, LTE
- Form factor: Touch Bar
- Dimensions: H: 163.3 mm (6.43 in ) W: 77.5 mm (3.05 in) D: 8.0 mm (0.31 in)
- Weight: 183 g (6 oz)
- Operating system: Android version shipped: Android 9, One UI 1 Last: Android 11, One UI 3.1
- System-on-chip: Qualcomm Snapdragon 450
- CPU: Octa-core 1.8 GHz
- GPU: Adreno 506
- Modem: Qualcomm® Snapdragon™ X9 LTE modem
- Memory: 3 GB or 4 GB LPDDR3
- Storage: 32 GB or 64 GB eMMC 5.1
- Removable storage: microSDXC UHS-I up to 512 GB
- SIM: Single SIM (Nano-SIM) or Dual SIM (Nano-SIM, Dual stand-by)
- Battery: Li - Po 4000mAh, non-removable
- Charging: Charging up to 15W, no wireless charging
- Rear camera: 13MP (Wide) + 8MP (Ultrawide) + 5MP (Depth)
- Front camera: 8MP (Wide)
- Display: 6.5 inches, IPS LCD, 720x1560px aspect ratio
- Sound: Internal speakers with Dolby Atmos support, 3.5mm stereo audio jack
- Connectivity: Wifi 802.11 b/g/n Wi-Fi Direct Wi-Fi Hotspot Bluetooth v.4.2
- Data inputs: USB Type-C 2.0 & 3.5mm Audio Jack
- Model: SM-A207F/DS (Global) SM-A207M/DS (LATAM, Brazil) SM-A2070 (HK, China)
- SAR: Head - 0.69 W/kg Body - 1.43 W/kg
- Other: A-GPS, GLONASS, GALILEO, BDS FM Radio
- Website: www.samsung.com/levant/smartphones/galaxy-a/samsung-galaxy-a20s-black-32gb-sm-a207fzkdmid//

The Samsung Galaxy A20s is an Android smartphone designed, developed, produced and marketed by Samsung Electronics. It was announced on September 24, 2019 and released to the general public on October 5, 2019. It is one of the 2019 Samsung Galaxy A Series of mid-range smartphones. The Samsung Galaxy A20s is a budget phone featuring lower specifications and performance than their flagships of the time, the Samsung Galaxy S10 and the Samsung Galaxy Note 10, however featuring a lower price at $499 MSRP vs $749 and $949 for the S10 and Note 10, respectively.

== Specifications ==
=== Hardware ===
- Chipset – Qualcomm Snapdragon 450 - Octa-core @ 1.80 GHz
- GPU – Adreno 506

Memory

- RAM/ROM sizes – 3 GB RAM with 32 GB ROM or 4 GB RAM with 64 GB ROM
- External memory support – Yes
- External memory maximum capacity – 512 GB

=== Network ===
The Samsung Galaxy A20s is compatible with 2G, 3G, and 4G networks. It supports Wi-Fi, Wi-Fi Direct, Bluetooth, and Mobile Tethering. It also supports a download speed of up to 150 megabits per second and an upload speed of up to 50 megabits per second when connected to a Long Term Evolution (LTE) network. The smartphone has a 42.2 megabits per second download and 5.76 megabits per second upload speed when connected to 3G. It has Bluetooth version 4.2 and 802.11 2.4 GHz b/g/n Wi-Fi.

=== Platform ===
The system on a chip on the Samsung Galaxy A20s is a 14 nanometer Qualcomm Snapdragon 450 chipset, including the Adreno 506 graphics processing unit.

=== Display ===
The Samsung Galaxy A20s has a TFT capacitive IPS LCD. It has a 6.5-inch display with high definition and a cinematic ratio of 19.5:9 and screen-to-body ratio of 82%. It has 264 PPI (Pixels Per Inch).

=== Memory ===
The Samsung Galaxy A20s comes with 3 GB or 4 GB of LPDDR3 RAM. The 3 GB RAM version has 32 GB of storage, while the 4 GB RAM version has 64 GB of storage. They have a storage type of eMMC version 5.1. The storage can be expanded up to 512 GB with external memory using a microSD card (and the smartphone supports UHS-I speed).

=== Camera ===
The Samsung Galaxy A20s has three rear cameras. The wide camera is 13 megapixels, the ultrawide camera is 8 megapixels, and the depth camera is 5 megapixels. The front camera is also an 8 megapixel wide camera.

=== Battery ===
The Samsung Galaxy A20s includes a 4000 mAh battery and supports 15 W fast charging.

=== Software ===
The Samsung Galaxy A20s comes preinstalled with Android 9 Pie and One UI core version 1.0 and can be updated to Android 11 with One UI core version 3.1.
