= Samsung Galaxy A21s =

Mid-range Android smartphone from Samsung

Samsung Galaxy A21 Samsung Galaxy A21s
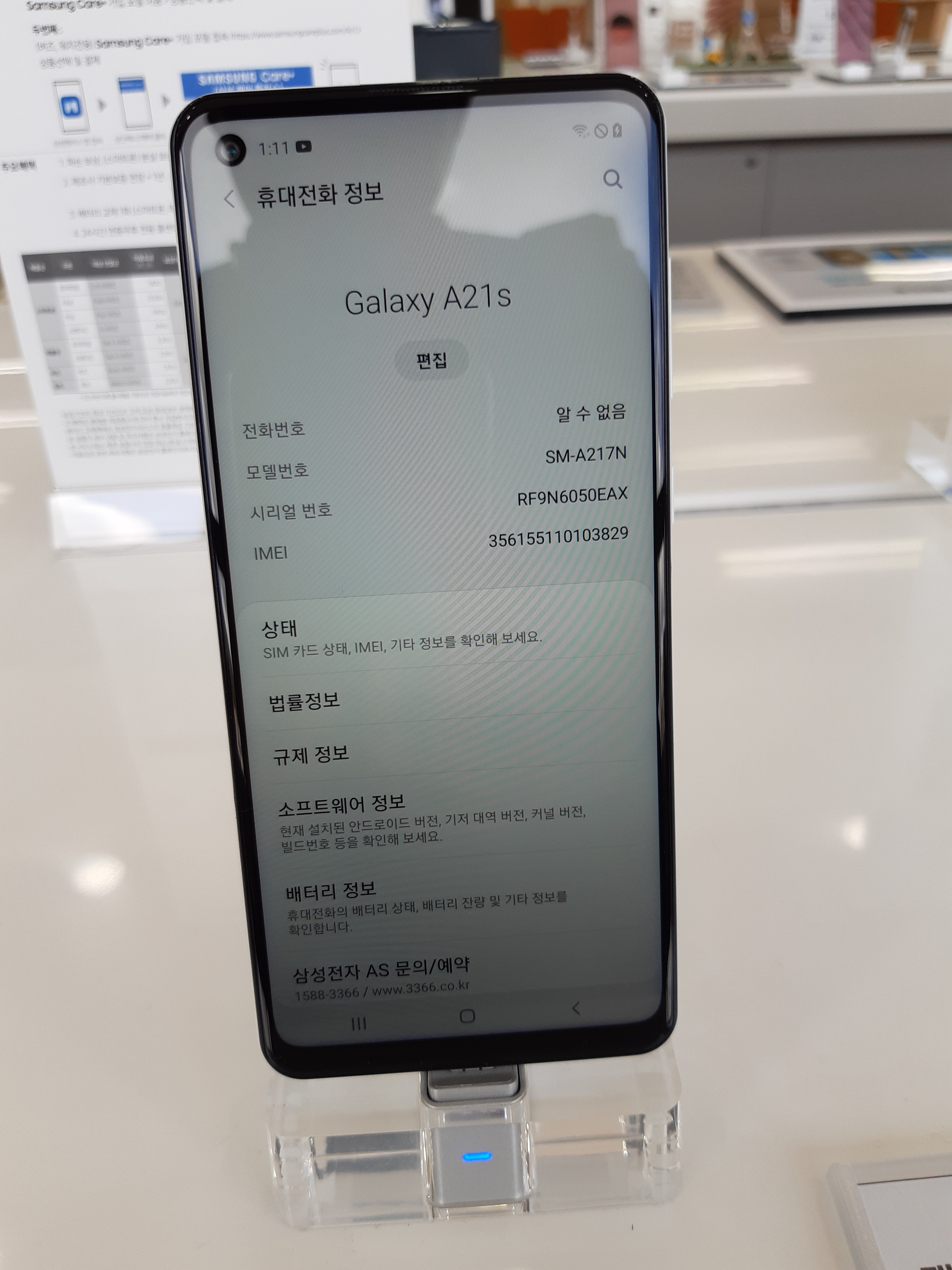
- Samsung Galaxy A21s on display in South Korea
- Brand: Samsung
- Manufacturer: Samsung Electronics
- Series: Samsung Galaxy A series
- First released: A21: 8 April 2020; 6 years ago A21s: 14 May 2020; 6 years ago
- Availability by region: A21s: 2 June 2020; 6 years ago A21: 26 June 2020; 6 years ago
- Predecessor: Samsung Galaxy A20; Samsung Galaxy A20s
- Successor: Samsung Galaxy A22; Samsung Galaxy A22 5G
- Related: Samsung Galaxy A21; Samsung Galaxy A30s
- Dimensions: A21: 167.8 mm (6.61 in) H 76.7 mm (3.02 in) W 8.1 mm (0.32 in) D A21s: 163.7 mm (6.44 in) H 75.3 mm (2.96 in) W 8.9 mm (0.35 in) D
- Weight: A21: 193 g (6.8 oz); A21s: 192 g (6.8 oz)
- Operating system: Original: Android 10 with One UI Core 2.1; Current: Android 12 with One UI Core 4.1
- System-on-chip: A21: MediaTek Helio P35 (12 nm); A21s: Exynos 850 (8 nm)
- CPU: A21: Octa-core (4x2.35 GHz Cortex-A53 & 4x1.8 GHz Cortex-A53); A21s: Octa-core (4x2.0 GHz Cortex-A55 & 4x2.0 GHz Cortex-A55)
- GPU: A21: PowerVR GE8320; A21s: Mali-G52
- Memory: A21: 3GB RAM; A21s: 2/3/4/6GB RAM
- Storage: A21: 32GB; A21s: 32/64/128GB
- Removable storage: microSDXC
- Battery: A21: 4000 mAh Lithium polymer A21s: 5000 mAh Lithium polymer
- Charging: 15W Adaptive Fast Charging
- Rear camera: Quad-Camera Setup; A21: Primary: 16 MP, f/1.8, (wide), 1/3.06", 1.0µm, PDAF; Ultrawide: 8 MP, f/2.2, 1/4.0", 1.12µm; Macro: 2 MP, f/2.4; Depth: 2 MP, f/2.4; A21s: Primary: Samsung ISOCELL S5KGM2; 48 MP, f/2.0, 26mm, 1/2.0", 0.8µm, PDAF; Ultrawide: Samsung ISOCELL S5K4HA; 8 MP, f/2.2, 13mm, 123°, 1/4.0", 1.12µm; Macro: GalaxyCore GC02M1; 2 MP, f/2.4, 1/5.0", 1.75µm; Depth: GalaxyCore GC02M1B; 2 MP, f/2.4, 1/5.0", 1.75µm; Camera features: LED flash, Panorama, HDR; Video recording: 1080p@30fps
- Front camera: Hynix Hi-1336; 13 MP, f/2.0 (A21), f/2.2 (A21s), 25mm (wide), 1/3.1", 1.12µm; 1080p@30fps
- Display: 6.5 in (17 cm)LED HD+ 720 x 1600 pixels, 20:9 ratio (~270 ppi density)
- Sound: Loudspeaker, 3.5mm auxiliary
- Connectivity: Wi-Fi 802.11 a/b/g/n/ac, dual-band, Wi-Fi Direct, hotspot, Bluetooth 5.0
- Model: SM-A217F/DS (Global); SM-A217F/DSN (Russia)
- SAR: 0.42 W/kg (head); 1.54 W/kg (body)
- Other: Fingerprint sensor (rear-mounted), accelerometer, gyro, proximity, compass
- Website: www.samsung.com/levant/smartphones/galaxy-a21s-a217/SM-A217FZKGMID/

The Samsung Galaxy A21 is a mid-range Android-based smartphone designed, developed, marketed, and manufactured by Samsung Electronics as part of its Galaxy A series.

Two models were released: the base model (simply known as the Galaxy A21) and the Galaxy A21s. The former was announced on April 8, 2020 and released exclusively for North American markets, while the latter was announced on May 15, 2020 for the rest of the world.

The two devices serve as successors to the Samsung Galaxy A20 and the Samsung Galaxy A20s.

== Specifications ==
=== Design ===
While both devices share nearly the same build (glass front and plastic frame and back), the back design differs between the two devices. The base variant featured a plain back design, while the "s" variant featured a crystal-like pattern.

Galaxy A21	Galaxy A21s
Black	Prism Crush Black; Prism Crush Silver; Prism Crush Blue; Prism Crush Red

=== Hardware ===
==== Display ====
Both variants have the same 6.5" PLS TFT LCD Infinity O display with HD+ 720 x 1600 resolution, 20:9 aspect ratio, ~270 ppi density.

==== Cameras ====
Both devices have a quad rear camera setup, but each features a different layout. The base variant has a vertically-arranged camera setup located in the upper left corner, while the "s" variant is arranged in an "L" shape located in the corner with a rectangular protrusion.

The setup consists of a 16 MP (for the base variant) or 48 MP ("s" variant) wide angle camera, an 8 MP ultrawide camera, a 2 MP macro camera, and a 2 MP depth sensor. It also has a single 13 MP front facing camera, which sits in a small punch hole on the front of the screen. The rear facing cameras can record video up to 1080p in 30 fps. The front cameras can shoot 1080p at 30 fps.

==== Processor and memory ====
The base variant is powered by the MediaTek Helio P35 cta-core SoC (System on a chip) and only sold in 3GB of RAM and 32GB of internal storage, which can be expanded via a microSD card of up to 512GB.

The "s" variant is powered by Exynos 850 octa-core SoC (System on a chip) and comes with RAM ranging from 3 GB to 6 GB as well as 32GB or 64GB internal storage, which can be expanded via a microSD card of up to 512GB.

==== Battery ====
It comes with a non-removable 5000mAh lithium polymer battery which charges with a 15W Fast Charger.

=== Software ===
Both devices originally came with Android 10 and One UI Core 2.1. It was promised to have at least two OS upgrades and 4 years of security updates.

	Pre-installed OS	OS Upgrades history		End of support
	Pre-installed OS	1st	2nd	End of support
A21	Android 10 (One UI Core 2.1)	Android 11 (One UI Core 3.1); October 2021	Android 12 (One UI Core 4.1); September 2022	August 2024
A21s	Android 10 (One UI Core 2.1)	Android 11 (One UI Core 3.0); March 2021	Android 12 (One UI Core 4.1); July 2022	July 2024
