= Samsung Galaxy A32 =

2021 Android smartphone produced by Samsung

Samsung Galaxy A32 Samsung Galaxy A32 5G (Samsung Galaxy Jump (South Korea))

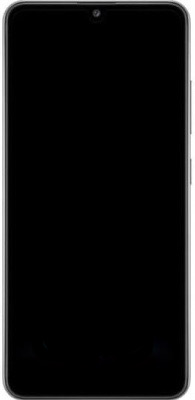
- Samsung Galaxy A32 (4G LTE)
- Brand: Samsung Galaxy
- Manufacturer: Samsung Electronics
- Type: 4G: Smartphone; 5G: Smartphone
- Series: Galaxy A series
- First released: 4G: 25 February 2021; 5 years ago 5G: 13 January 2021; 5 years ago
- Availability by region: 4G: 25 February 2021; 5 years ago 5G: 22 January 2021; 5 years ago
- Predecessor: Samsung Galaxy A31
- Successor: Samsung Galaxy A33 5G
- Related: Samsung Galaxy A13; Samsung Galaxy A22; Samsung Galaxy A42 5G; Samsung Galaxy A52; Samsung Galaxy A72
- Form factor: Slate
- Dimensions: 4G: 158.9 mm (6.26 in) H 73.6 mm (2.90 in) W 8.4 mm (0.33 in) D 5G: 164.2 mm (6.46 in) H 76.1 mm (3.00 in) W 9.1 mm (0.36 in) D
- Weight: 4G: 184 g (6.5 oz); 5G: 205 g (7.2 oz)
- Operating system: Original: Android 11 with One UI 3.1; Current: Android 13 with One UI 5.1
- System-on-chip: 4G: MediaTek Helio G80 (12 nm); 5G: MediaTek Dimensity 720 (7 nm)
- CPU: Octa-core; 4G: 2x2.0 GHz Cortex-A75 & 6x1.8 GHz Cortex-A55; 5G: 2x2.0 GHz Cortex-A76 & 6x2.0 GHz Cortex-A55
- GPU: 4G: Mali-G52 MC2, 2 core 1000 MHz; 5G: Mali-G57 MC3
- Memory: 4, 6 or 8 GB RAM
- Storage: 64 or 128 GB
- Removable storage: microSDXC, up to 512 GB
- Battery: 5000 mAh lithium-polymer
- Charging: 15W Fast charging
- Rear camera: 4G: Primary: Samsung ISOCELL (S5K)GW3; 64 MP, f/1.8, 25mm, FoV 82.7°, 1/1.97", 0.7 μm, PDAF; Ultrawide: Sony IMX 355 or Siliconfile SR846D; 8 MP, f/2.2, 13mm, FoV 116.3°, 1/4.0", 1.12 μm, FF; Macro: GalaxyCore GC5035; 5 MP, f/2.4, 1/5.0", 1.12 μm, FF; Depth: GalaxyCore GC5035; 5 MP, f/2.4, 1/5.0", 1.12 μm 1080p@30fps, 720p@30fps 5G: Primary: Samsung ISOCELL (S5K)GM2; 48 MP, f/1.8, 25mm, FoV 82°, 1/2.0", 0.8 μm, PDAF; Ultrawide: Siliconfile SR846D; 8 MP, f/2.2, 13mm, FoV 116.3°, 1/4.0", 1.12 μm, FF; Macro: GalaxyCore GC5035; 5 MP, f/2.4, 25mm, 1/5.0", 1.12 μm, FF; Depth: GalaxyCore GC02M1B; 2 MP, f/2.4, 1/5.0", 1.75 μm 4K@30fps, 1080p@30fps, 720p@30fps
- Front camera: 4G: SK Hynix Hi-2021; 20 MP, f/2.2, 25mm (wide), FoV 81.7°, 1/2.78", 1.0 μm, FF; 5G: Samsung ISOCELL S5K3L6; 13 MP, f/2.2, 25mm (wide), FoV 80.9°, 1/3.1", 1.12 μm, FF
- Display: 4G: 6.4 in (160 mm) 90 Hz Super AMOLED, 1080 × 2400, 20:9 ratio, ~84.9% screen-to-body ratio, ~411 ppi, 800 nits HBM, corning gorilla glass 5; 5G: 6.5 in (170 mm) TFT LCD, 720 × 1600, 20:9 ratio, ~81.6% screen-to-body ratio, ~270 ppi
- Sound: Loudspeaker (mono)
- Connectivity: Wi-Fi 802.11 a/b/g/n/ac, dual-band, Wi-Fi Direct, Hotspot; Bluetooth 5.0, A2DP, LE; A-GPS, GLONASS, BDS, GALILEO; NFC, FM Radio
- Data inputs: USB-C
- Model: International models: 4G: SM-A325F, SM-A325F/DS, SM-A325M; 5G: SM-A326B, SM-A326B/DS, SM-A326BR, SM-A326BR/DS, SM-A326W, SM-A326U; Japanese model: SCG08 (au, 5G)

The Samsung Galaxy A32 is a mid-range Android-based smartphone developed and manufactured by Samsung Electronics. It serves as the successor to the Galaxy A31. The 5G variant was the first to be announced on 13 January 2021, while the LTE variant was announced subsequently on 26 February 2021.

== Specifications ==
=== Design ===
Both devices uses Corning Gorilla Glass 5 to protect the display, plastic frame and plastic back.

Galaxy A32 LTE	Galaxy A32 5G
Awesome Violet; Awesome Blue; Awesome White; Awesome Black

=== Hardware ===
==== Display ====
The two variants have different display specifications. The LTE variant have a FHD+ (1080 × 2400) resolution, a SuperAMOLED display with an Infinity-U notch, and a 90 Hz refresh rate. The 5G variant has a slightly downgraded screen specification: HD+ (720 × 1600) resolution, PLS display with an Infinity-V notch, and either 60 Hz (International) or 90 Hz (USA) refresh rate.

==== Cameras ====
The rear camera setup for both variants features a quad-camera layout. The key differences between the variants are their main primary camera and front-facing camera.

The LTE variant features a 64 MP (f/1.8) main camera and a 20 MP (f/2.2) front camera. The 5G variant features a 48 MP (f/1.8) main camera and a 13 MP (f/2.2) front camera. For both devices, they have the same 8 MP ultrawide camera, 5 MP macro, and 5 MP depth sensors.

Video recording is limited to 1080p@30fps for the front camera for both variants, while the rear primary camera is limited to 1080p@30fps for the LTE variant and 4K@30fps for the 5G variant.

==== Processor and memory ====
The LTE variant uses the MediaTek Helio G80 (12 nm) SoC with octa-core CPU, while the 5G variant uses the MediaTek Dimensity 720 5G (7 nm) SoC with octa-core CPU. Both variants offer RAM configurations from 4 GB to 8 GB and storage options of either 64 GB or 128 GB, with support for microSD cards. The 5G variant uses UFS 2.1 for its internal storage, while the LTE variant uses eMMC.

=== Software ===
The phones were pre-installed with One UI 3.1 based on Android 11. Like its predecessor, both models are eligible for two major Android OS upgrades and 4 years of security updates.

	Pre-installed OS	OS Upgrades history		End of support
	Pre-installed OS	1st	2nd	End of support
A32 LTE	Android 11 (One UI 3.1)	Android 12 (One UI 4.1); May 2022	Android 13 (One UI 5.0); December 2022	April 2025
A32 5G	Android 11 (One UI 3.1)	Android 12 (One UI 4.1); April 2022	Android 13 (One UI 5.0); December 2022	April 2025

== Reception ==
The device was given a positive reception, with Wired giving it an 8/10, and The Verge giving it a 7.5/10.
