= Samsung Galaxy A72 =

2021 mid-range Android-based smartphone from Samsung

- Brand: Samsung
- Manufacturer: Samsung Electronics
- Series: Galaxy A series
- First released: March 17, 2021; 5 years ago
- Availability by region: March 26, 2021; 5 years ago
- Predecessor: Samsung Galaxy A71
- Successor: Samsung Galaxy A73 5G; Samsung Galaxy A53 5G (for North America)
- Related: Samsung Galaxy A52; Samsung Galaxy A32; Samsung Galaxy A22
- Colors: Awesome Black, Awesome White, Awesome Violet, Awesome Blue
- Dimensions: 165 mm (6.5 in) H 77.4 mm (3.05 in) W 8.4 mm (0.33 in) D
- Weight: 203 g (7.2 oz)
- Operating system: Original: Android 11 with One UI 3.1; Current: Android 14 with One UI 6.1
- System-on-chip: Qualcomm Snapdragon 720G (8 nm)
- CPU: Octa-core (2x2.3 GHz Kryo 465 Gold & 6x1.8 GHz Kryo 465 Silver)
- GPU: Adreno 618
- Memory: 6 GB or 8 GB RAM
- Storage: 128 GB or 256 GB
- Removable storage: microSD, up to 1 TB
- Battery: 5000 mAh Li-Ion non-removable
- Charging: 25 W Fast-charging
- Rear camera: Quad-Camera Setup; Primary: Sony IMX 682; 64 MP, f/1.8, 24mm, FoV 83°, 1/1.73", 0.8 µm, PDAF, OIS; Telephoto: Hynix Hi-847; 8 MP, f/2.4, (telephoto), 1/4.4", 1.0 µm, PDAF, OIS, 3x optical zoom; Ultrawide: Samsung ISOCELL (S5K)3L6; 12 MP, f/2.2, 13mm, FoV 123°, 1/3.0", 1.12 µm; Macro: GalaxyCore GC5035; 5 MP, f/2.4, 1/5.0", 1.12 µm; Features: LED flash, Panorama, HDR; Video: 4K@30fps, 1080p@30/60fps; gyro-EIS
- Front camera: Sony IMX 616; 32 MP, f/2.2, 25mm (wide), FoV 82.5°, 1/2.8", 0.8 µm; Features: HDR; Video: 4K@30fps, 1080p@30fps
- Display: 6.7 in (170 mm) 90 Hz Super AMOLED, 1080 × 2400, 20:9 ratio, ~393 ppi, 800 nits peak brightness
- Sound: Loudspeaker (stereo)
- Data inputs: USB-C
- Water resistance: IP67

The Samsung Galaxy A72 is a mid-range Android-based smartphone developed and manufactured by Samsung Electronics. The phone, announced alongside the Galaxy A52 at Samsung's virtual Awesome Unpacked event on 17 March 2021, serves as the successor to the Galaxy A71. The Galaxy A72 retains many of the features of its previous iteration, but also includes an upgraded 5,000 mAh battery, IP67 water and dust resistance, and the inclusion of an 8 MP telephoto camera. Unlike its predecessor, the Galaxy A72 doesn't have a 5G variant (a 5G A7x model would later return to its successor).

== Specifications ==
=== Design ===
The Galaxy A72 has a similar design with its predecessor. It has an Infinity-O display with a cutout for the front-facing camera, just like the Galaxy A71. However, the device has matte color options rather than the glossy gradient finishes on the Galaxy A71. The display is protected by Corning Gorilla Glass 3 while the frame and back panel is made of plastic. It has IP67 water and dust resistance.

Galaxy A72
- Awesome Violet
- Awesome Blue
- Awesome White
- Awesome Black

=== Hardware ===
Galaxy A72 has Bluetooth 5.0, Wi-Fi 802.11 a/b/g/n/ac, a 3.5 mm headphone jack, and NFC. Galaxy A72 has stereo speakers, an under-display fingerprint sensor and a hybrid Dual-SIM slot (Nano-SIM/MicroSD card combo).

==== Display ====
Galaxy A72 has a 6.7-inch Super AMOLED display with 800 nits maximum brightness, 20:9 aspect ratio, 1080×2400 resolution, ~393 PPI pixel density and 90 Hz refresh rate. The display also has a punch hole for the front-facing camera.

==== Battery ====
It has a 5000 mAh non-removable battery with 25W fast charging support. There is a 25W charger in the box, unlike the Galaxy A52 shipping with a 15W charger.

==== Processor and memory ====
The Galaxy A72 uses the Qualcomm Snapdragon 720G SoC octa-core CPU, and paired with 6 or 8 GB RAM and 128 GB internal storage (the storage uses UFS 2.0).

==== Camera ====
Galaxy A72 has a quad rear camera setup with a 64 MP main camera with optical image stabilization (OIS), a 12 MP wide-angle camera, an 8 MP telephoto camera (with optical image stabilization and 3x optical (lossless) zoom) and a 5 MP macro. The phone is capable of zooming up to 30x and has a 32 MP front-facing camera. The rear camera setup also includes an LED flash.

=== Software ===
The A72 was shipped with Android 11 and Samsung's One UI 3.1. In May 2021, the Galaxy A52 and A72 were announced to receive three generations of Android software update support.

	Pre-installed OS	OS Upgrades history			End of support
	Pre-installed OS	1st	2nd	3rd	End of support
A72	Android 11 (One UI 3.1)	Android 12 (One UI 4.0); January 2022	Android 13 (One UI 5.0); November 2022	Android 14 (One UI 6.0); January 2024 (One UI 6.1); May 2024	April 2025
