= Samsung Galaxy A11 =

2020 entry-level smartphone by Samsung Electronics

Samsung Galaxy A11 Samsung Galaxy M11

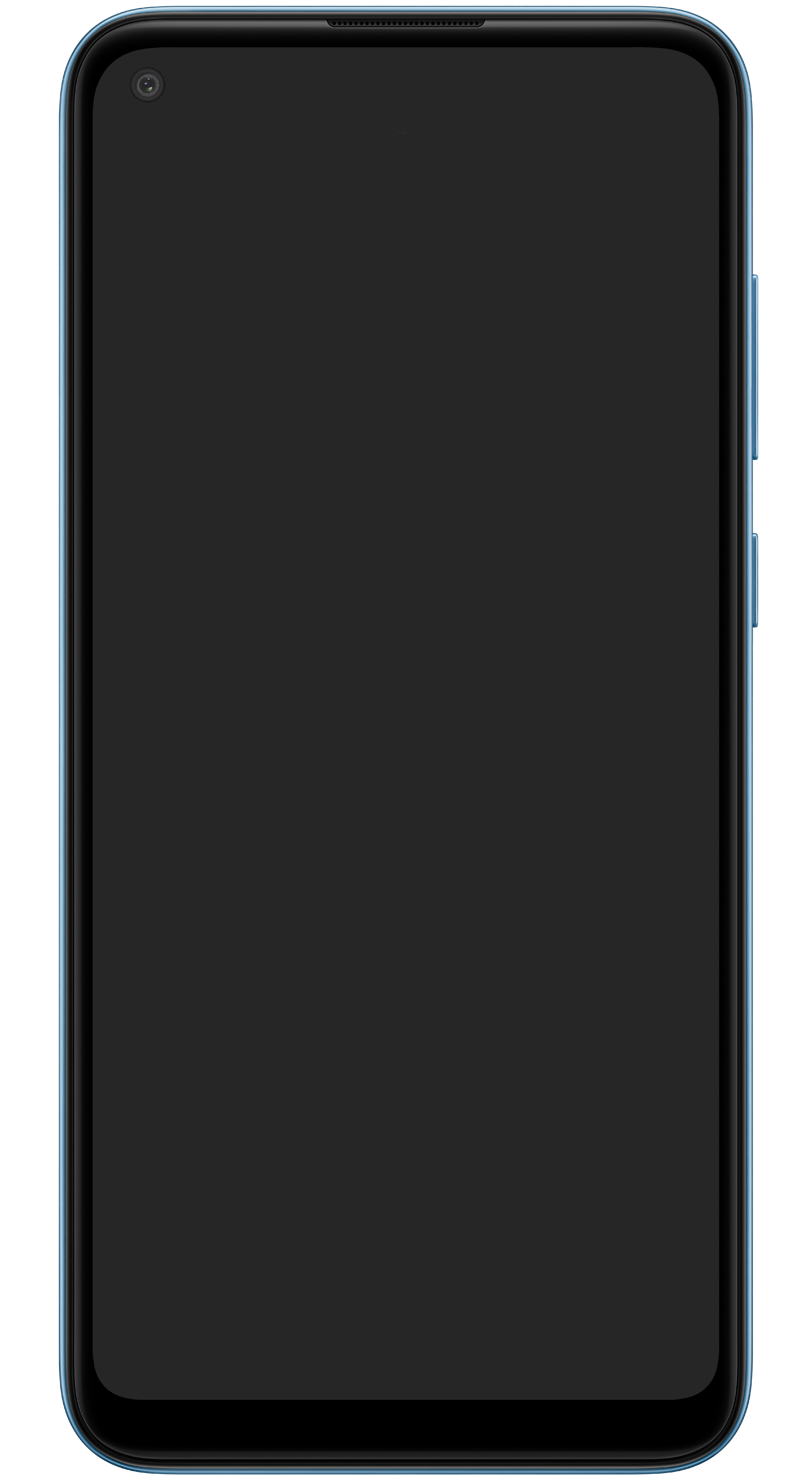
- Brand: Samsung
- Manufacturer: Samsung Electronics
- Type: Smartphone
- Series: Galaxy A
- Family: Samsung Galaxy
- First released: March 30, 2020; 6 years ago
- Predecessor: For A11: Samsung Galaxy A10e (US only); Samsung Galaxy A10; Samsung Galaxy A10s; For M11: Samsung Galaxy M10
- Successor: Samsung Galaxy A12
- Related: Samsung Galaxy A51; Samsung Galaxy A71
- Compatible networks: 2G / 3G / 4G
- Form factor: Slate
- Dimensions: 161.4 mm (6.35 in) H 76.3 mm (3.00 in) W 8 mm (0.31 in) D
- Weight: 177 g (6.2 oz)
- Operating system: Original: Android 10 with One UI Core 2 Current: Android 12 with One UI Core 4.1
- System-on-chip: Snapdragon 450
- CPU: 1.8GHz Octa-core
- GPU: Adreno 506
- Memory: 2GB, 3GB, 4GB RAM
- Storage: 32GB or 64GB
- Removable storage: MicroSD, up to 512GB
- Battery: A11: 4000 mAh Li-Polymer Battery; M11: 5000 mAh Li-Polymer Battery
- Rear camera: Primary: 13 MP, f/1.8, 27mm, 1/3.1", 1.12μm, AF; Ultrawide: 5 MP, f/2.2, 14mm, 115°, 1/5.0", 1.12μm Depth: 2 MP, f/2.4, 1/5.0", 1.75μm LED flash, panorama, HDR; 1080p@30fps
- Front camera: 8 MP, f/2.0, 27mm (wide), 1/4.0", 1.12μm 1080p@30fps
- Display: 6.4 inch HD+ PLS LCD (720 x 1560 px) (~268 ppi density) 19.5:9 ratio
- Data inputs: Sensors: Accelerometer; Fingerprint scanner (rear-mounted); Proximity sensor; Other: Physical sound volume keys; USB-C Port
- Model: A11: SM-A115x; M11: SM-M115x (last letter varies by carrier and international models)

The Samsung Galaxy A11 is an entry-level Android-based smartphone manufactured and developed by Samsung Electronics. It was first announced on March 13, 2020, as a successor to the Samsung Galaxy A10. A rebranded version of this device, Galaxy M11, was first released on March 30, 2020, but with a larger battery capacity (5000 mAh).

== Specifications ==
=== Design ===
Similar to its predecessor, it continues to feature a plastic back (with a glossy texture), plastic frame, and a glass front.

Galaxy A11	Galaxy M11
Black; White; Blue; Red	Black; Violet; Metallic Blue

=== Hardware ===
==== Display ====
Both devices have the same 6.4" PLS TFT display, with a 1560x720 (HD+) resolution.

==== Battery ====
The A11 has a 4000 mAh battery, while the M11 has a 5000mAh battery. Both devices supports 15 W fast charging.

==== Processor and memory ====
Both devices use the Qualcomm Snapdragon 450 SoC. RAM options vary from 2 GB to 4 GB, while storage options are available either in 32 GB or 64 GB. Both devices also used eMMC for its internal storage. It has support for expandable storage with the use of the microSD card up to 512 GB.

==== Cameras ====
Unlike the Galaxy A10, which had only one rear camera, the A11 has a triple camera setup, a first for the Galaxy A1x lineup.

Both devices have a triple camera setup, a first for the Galaxy A1x and Galaxy M1x lineups. It has a 13 MP main camera (f/1.8), a 5 MP (f/2.2) ultrawide, and a 2 MP (f/2.4) depth camera. The selfie camera received a bump to 8 MP (up from 5).

=== Software ===
The Galaxy A11 and M11 were shipped with Android 10 and One UI Core 2.0. Like its predecessor, it is only slated to receive 2 OS upgrades and 4 years of security updates.

	Pre-installed OS	OS Upgrades history		End of support
	Pre-installed OS	1st	2nd	End of support
A11	Android 10 (One UI Core 2.0)	Android 11 (One UI Core 3.1); May 2021	Android 12 (One UI Core 4.1); October 2022	May 2024
M11	Android 10 (One UI Core 2.0)	Android 11 (One UI Core 3.1); May 2021	Android 12 (One UI Core 4.1); July 2022	May 2024

Preceded by Samsung Galaxy A10	Samsung Galaxy A11; 2020	Succeeded by Samsung Galaxy A12
