= Samsung Galaxy A22 =

2021 mid-range Android smartphones from Samsung

Samsung Galaxy A22 Samsung Galaxy A22 5G

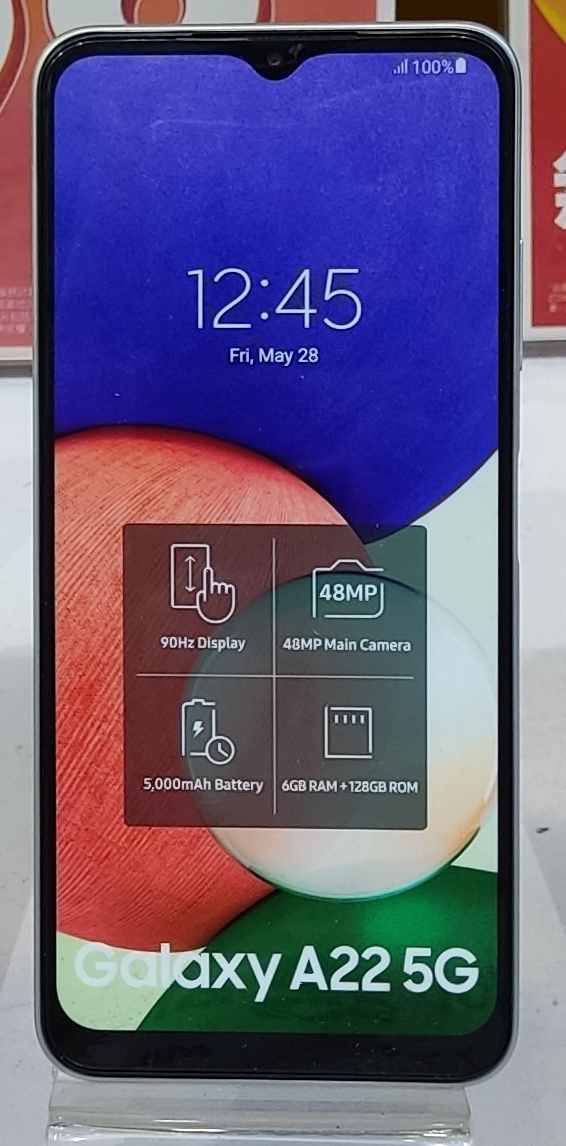
- Samsung Galaxy A22 on display in Hong Kong
- Brand: Samsung
- Manufacturer: Samsung Electronics
- Type: Phablet
- Series: Galaxy A series
- First released: June 3, 2021; 5 years ago
- Availability by region: 4G: July 1, 2021; 5 years ago 5G: June 24, 2021; 5 years ago
- Predecessor: Samsung Galaxy A21; Samsung Galaxy A21s
- Successor: Samsung Galaxy A23
- Related: Samsung Galaxy A02; Samsung Galaxy A12; Samsung Galaxy A32; Samsung Galaxy A52; Samsung Galaxy A72
- Compatible networks: List: 2G bands: GSM 850 / 900 / 1800 / 1900; 3G bands: HSDPA 850 / 900 / 1900 / 2100; 4G bands (LTE): 1, 2, 3, 5, 7, 8, 20, 28, 38, 40, 41; 5G bands: 1, 3, 5, 7, 8, 20, 28, 38, 40, 41, 78, 79
- Form factor: Slate
- Colors: 4G: Black, White, Mint, Violet; 5G: Gray, White, Mint, Violet
- Dimensions: 4G: 159.3 mm (6.27 in) H 73.6 mm (2.90 in) W 8.4 mm (0.33 in) D 5G: 167.2 mm (6.58 in) H 76.4 mm (3.01 in) W 9.0 mm (0.35 in) D
- Weight: 4G: 186 g (6.6 oz); 5G: 203 g (7.2 oz)
- Operating system: Original: Android 11 with One UI Core 3.1; Current: Android 13 with One UI Core 5.1
- System-on-chip: 4G: MediaTek MT6769V/CU Helio G80 (12 nm); 5G: MediaTek MT6833 Dimensity 700 5G (7 nm)
- CPU: 4G: Octa-core (2x2.0 GHz Cortex-A75 & 6x1.8 GHz Cortex-A55); 5G: Octa-core (2x2.2 GHz Cortex-A76 & 6x2.0 GHz Cortex-A55)
- GPU: 4G: Mali-G52 MC2; 5G: Mali-G57 MC2
- Memory: 4G: 4, 6 GB; 5G: 4, 6, 8 GB
- Storage: 64/128 GB
- Removable storage: microSDXC, expandable up to 1TB
- Battery: 5000 mAh lithium-polymer
- Charging: 15 W Fast charging
- Rear camera: 4G: Primary: Samsung ISOCELL S5KGM2 or Sony IMX 582; 48 MP, f/1.8, 25mm, 1/2.0", 0.8µm, PDAF, OIS; Ultrawide: Sony IMX 355; 8 MP, f/2.2, 13mm, 123°, 1/4.0", 1.12µm; Macro: 2 MP, f/2.4; Depth: 2 MP, f/2.4; 5G: Primary: Hynix Hi-4821Q; 48 MP, f/1.8, 25mm, 1/2.0", 0.8µm, PDAF; Ultrawide: Hynix Hi-556; 5 MP, f/2.2, 13mm, 115°, 1/5.0", 1.12µm; Depth: 2 MP, f/2.4; All: LED flash, panorama, HDR; 4G: 1080p@30fps; 5G: 1152p@30fps
- Front camera: 4G: Sony IMX 258; 13 MP, f/2.2, 25mm (wide), 1/3.06", 1.12µm; 5G: GalaxyCore GC8034; 8 MP, f/2.0, 27mm (wide), 1/4.0", 1.12µm; All: 1080p@30fps
- Display: 4G: 6.4 in (160 mm); 720 x 1600 px resolution, 20:9 ratio (~274 ppi density); Super AMOLED, 90Hz, 600 nits 5G: 6.6 in (170 mm); 1080 x 2400 px resolution, 20:9 ratio (~399 ppi density); TFT LCD, 90Hz
- Sound: Loudspeaker, 3.5 mm headphone jack
- Connectivity: Wi-Fi: 802.11 a/b/g/n/ac Wi-Fi Direct; Wi-Fi hotspot Bluetooth: 5.0; USB: 2.0, Type-C 1.0
- Data inputs: Sensors: Accelerometer; Proximity sensor; Fingerprint scanner (side-mounted); Gyroscope; Magnetometer; Always On Display
- Model: 4G: SM-A225F, SM-A225F/DS, SM-A225M, SM-A225M/DS; 5G: SM-A226B, SM-A226B/DS, SM-A226B/DSN, SM-A226BR, SM-A226BR/N, SM-A226L, SC-56B
- Website: Galaxy A22 5G

The Samsung Galaxy A22 is a mid-range Android-based smartphone developed and manufactured by Samsung Electronics as a part of Galaxy A series. The LTE and 5G variants were first announced on 3 June 2021, making the latter the first in the Galaxy A2x series to implement 5G. There were two rebranded versions of the 5G variant: the Galaxy F42 5G (in India as a Flipkart exclusive) with different color options, 64 MP main camera and a slightly different camera setup, and the Galaxy Wide5 (for South Korea) which has the same specifications as the Galaxy F42 5G.

== Specifications ==
=== Design ===
Both devices feature a plastic frame and back, with a glass front. There is a side-mounted capacitive fingerprint reader at the right side.

Galaxy A22 LTE	Galaxy A22 5G
Violet; Mint; White; Black	Violet; Mint; White; Gray

=== Hardware ===
==== Display ====
Both devices have different screen specifications to set the two variants apart. The LTE variant features a 6.4-inch SuperAMOLED display and an HD+ (720x1600) resolution. The 5G variants features a 6.6-inch PLS TFT LCD display with a FHD+ (1080x2400) resolution. Both variants have a 90 Hz refresh rate.

==== Cameras ====
The LTE variant has a quad-camera setup: 48 MP main camera (with OIS), a 8 MP ultrawide-angle camera, and a 2 MP sensor for the macro and depth cameras. The front camera features a 13 MP sensor.

The 5G variant has a triple-camera setup: 48 MP main camera (64 MP for the F42 and Wide5), a 5 MP wide-angle camera and a 2 MP depth sensor. There is an 8 MP front-facing camera located in the V-shaped notch of the display.

==== Processor and memory ====
The LTE variant is powered by the MediaTek Helio G80 processor, while the 5G variants are powered by the MediaTek Dimensity 700 SoC.

Both devices offer RAM options of 4 GB or 6 GB, with an 8 GB option available for the 5G variant, and internal storage options of 64 GB or 128 GB. The LTE in all variants and 5G version in 64 GB utilizes eMMC 5.1 for its internal storage. However, the Galaxy A22 5G in 128 GB variant upgrades its storage type to UFS 2.1.

==== Battery ====
Both variants have a 5000 mAh non-removable battery with 15 W fast charging support.

=== Software ===
The phones were shipped with Android 11 and One UI Core 3.1. It would receive 2 OS upgrades and 4 years of security patches.

	Pre-installed OS	OS Upgrades history		End of support
	Pre-installed OS	1st	2nd	End of support
A22 LTE	Android 11 (One UI Core 3.1)	Android 12 (One UI Core 4.1); May 2022	Android 13 (One UI Core 5.0); December 2022	July/August 2025
A22 5G	Android 11 (One UI Core 3.1)	Android 12 (One UI Core 4.1); July 2022	Android 13 (One UI Core 5.0); November 2022	July/August 2025
F42 5G	Android 11 (One UI Core 3.1)	Android 12 (One UI Core 4.1); July 2022	Android 13 (One UI Core 5.0); November 2022	July/August 2025
Wide5	Android 11 (One UI Core 3.1)	Android 12 (One UI Core 4.1); July 2022	Android 13 (One UI Core 5.0); November 2022	July/August 2025
