= Samsung Galaxy A10s =

2019 Android-based smartphone from Samsung

- Brand: Samsung Galaxy
- Developer: Samsung Electronics
- Manufacturer: Jiaxing Yongrui Electron Technology
- Type: Phone
- Series: Galaxy A series
- First released: August 27, 2019; 7 years ago
- Predecessor: Samsung Galaxy A10
- Successor: Samsung Galaxy A11
- Compatible networks: GSM / HSPA / LTE
- Form factor: Slate
- Dimensions: 156.9 mm (6.18 in) H 75.8 mm (2.98 in) W 7.8 mm (0.31 in) D
- Weight: 168 g (5.9 oz)
- Operating system: Android 9, One UI Core 1.5 (upgradable to Android 11 with One UI Core 3.1)
- CPU: MediaTek Helio P22 MT6762 (12 nm)
- GPU: PowerVR GE8320
- Memory: 2GB, 3GB RAM
- Storage: 32GB, eMMC 5.1
- Removable storage: microSDXC
- SIM: Dual SIM (Nano-SIM, dual stand-by)
- Battery: 3900mAh
- Rear camera: Primary: Hynix Hi-1336; 13 MP, f/1.8, 28mm, 1/3.1", 1.12µm, AF; Depth: GalaxyCore GC2375H; 2 MP, f/2.4, 1/5.0", 1.75μm; LED flash, panorama, HDR; 1080p@30fps
- Front camera: Hynix Hi-846; 8 MP, f/2.0, 26mm (wide), 1/4.0", 1.12μm; 1080p@30fps
- Display: 6.2 in (160 mm), 90.5 cm2 (~80.7% screen-to-body ratio); 720 x 1520 pixels, 19:9 ratio (~271 ppi density)
- Sound: 3.5mm Headphone Jack
- Connectivity: Wi-Fi IEEE 802.11 b/g/n, Wi-Fi Direct, Hotspot; Bluetooth 4.2, A2DP, LE; A-GPS, GLONASS, GALILEO, BDS
- Model: SM-A107F, SM-A107M

The Samsung Galaxy A10s is an Android-based smartphone developed and marketed by Samsung Electronics as a part of its Galaxy A series. This phone was announced on August 27, 2019, and was targeted towards the low-budget category. It is the second Galaxy smartphone not manufactured by Samsung and was instead manufactured by Jiaxing Yongrui Electron Technology. Unlike the first ODM Galaxy smartphone, the China-exclusive Samsung Galaxy A6s, it is available internationally.

== Design ==
The Galaxy A10s sports a 7.8 mm body featuring a glossy plastic finish, with four color options: black, green, blue, or red. It has an HD+ display PLS TFT LCD and an Infinity-V cutout on the front to host the front camera module. The screen also flaunts an auto-adaptive brightness feature. The additional features also include a rear-mounted fingerprint sensor, along with face recognition for unlocking the phone and a dual camera setup for photography.

== Specifications ==
=== Hardware ===
The Samsung Galaxy A10s is a smartphone with a slate-type factor form. The dimensions of A10s are 156.9 mm × 75.8 mm × 7.8 mm (6.18 in × 2.98 in × 0.31 in) weighing 168 g (5.93 oz). The device is equipped with a dual sim with support for GSM, HSPA, and LTE supporting all 4G bands for connectivity, as well a Wi-Fi 802.11 b/g/n, Wi-Fi Direct, Hotspot with Bluetooth 4.2, A2DP, LE support. For navigation, GPS with A-GPS, GLONASS, BeiDou, and GALILEO are supported. It has a microUSB 2.0 and USB On-The-Go support.

It has a 6.2-inch diagonal touchscreen, PLS TFT LCD with an Infinity-V cutout, rounded corners, and a 720 × 1520 (HD+) pixel resolution display. The device is powered up by a 3900 mAh lithium polymer non-removable battery.

The chipset is powered by a MediaTek MT6762 Helio P22 (12 nm) Octa-core 2.0 GHz Cortex-A53 with GPU PowerVR GE8320 (4 cores at 2.4 GHz + 4 cores at 1.9 GHz). The internal eMMC-type memory 5.1 is 32 GB expandable with a dedicated microSD card slot. The Samsung Galaxy A10s also comes in a dual memory option of 2 GB RAM and 3 GB RAM.

It has dual camera with a main sensor powered by 13 MP, f/1.8, 28 mm (wide), AF capable of recording up to 1080p at 30 fps and a secondary depth 2 MP depth sensor with f/2.4 aperture. While at the front, it has a single 8 MP, f/2.0, with video recording capabilities of 1080p at 30 fps.

=== Software ===
Samsung had launched the Galaxy A10s with Android 9 Pie-based One UI. The smartphone received the Android 10 based One UI 2 update in 2020, and the Android 11-based on One UI 3 update in July 2021.

=== Rebrand ===
The Galaxy A10s was mentioned in the name section of the Samsung Galaxy M01s listing in the Google Play Console after its recent TUV Rhineland certification, hinting that the device would be a rebranded version of the A10s released in August of the previous year. This was further confirmed after discovering the same specifications found on both devices. However, the Galaxy M01s features a lithium-ion, instead of a lithium-polymer battery, different two-color variations, slight weight differences, and a lower price than the former.
