= Samsung Galaxy A10 =

2019 smartphone from Samsung

Samsung Galaxy A10 Samsung Galaxy A10e Samsung Galaxy A10s

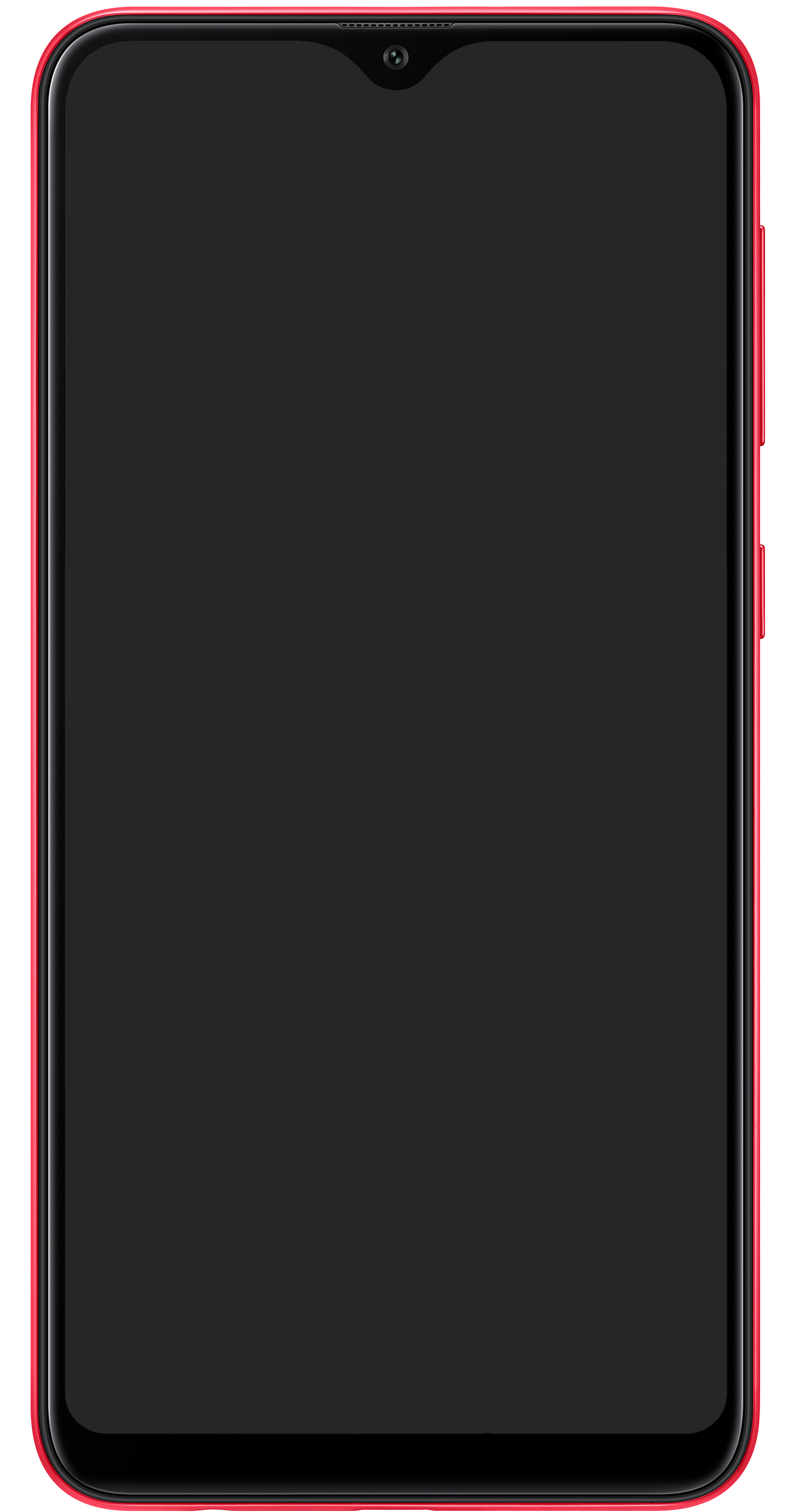
- Galaxy A10 in Red
- Brand: Samsung
- Manufacturer: Samsung Electronics
- Type: Smartphone
- Series: A Series
- First released: A10: February 28, 2019; 7 years ago A10e: June 13, 2019; 7 years ago A10s: August 12, 2019; 7 years ago
- Predecessor: Samsung Galaxy J3 (2018); Samsung Galaxy J4
- Successor: Samsung Galaxy A11
- Related: Samsung Galaxy A2 Core; Samsung Galaxy A20; Samsung Galaxy A01
- Dimensions: A10: 155.6 mm (6.13 in) H; 75.6 mm (2.98 in) W; 7.9 mm (0.31 in) D; A10e: 147.3 mm (5.80 in) H; 69.6 mm (2.74 in) W; 8.4 mm (0.33 in) D; A10s: 156.9 mm (6.18 in) H; 75.8 mm (2.98 in) W; 7.8 mm (0.31 in) D
- Weight: A10: 168 g (5.9 oz); A10e: 141 g (5.0 oz); A10s: 168 g (5.9 oz)
- Operating system: Original: Android 9.0 "Pie" with One UI 1.1; Current: Android 11 with One UI 3.1
- System-on-chip: A10 and A10e: Samsung Exynos 7 Octa 7884; A10s: Mediatek Helio P22
- CPU: A10 and A10e: Octa-core (2x1.6 GHz Cortex-A73 & 6x1.35 GHz Cortex-A53); A10s: Octa-core (2.0 GHz Cortex-A53)
- GPU: A10 and A10e: Mali-G71 MP2; A10s: PowerVR GE8320
- Memory: 2/3 (A10e/s)/4 (A10) GB RAM
- Storage: 32 GB
- Removable storage: MicroSD, up to 512 GB
- Battery: A10: 3400 mAh Li-Polymer Battery; A10e: 3000 mAh Li-Polymer Battery; A10s: 4000 mAh Li-Polymer Battery
- Rear camera: A10 and A10s: 13 MP, f/1.9 (f/1.8 for A10s), 28mm (wide), AF A10e: 8 MP or 5 MP, f/1.9 AF; Features: LED flash, panorama, HDR; Video recording resolutions: 1080p@30fps
- Front camera: A10: 5 MP, f/2.0 A10e: 5 MP or 2 MP, f/2.0 A10s: 8 MP, f/2.0
- Display: A10 and A10s: 6.2" HD+ PLS TFT; A10e: 5.83" HD+ PLS TFT
- Model: SM-A105x (A10); SM-A102x (A10); SM-A107x (A10s) (last letter varies by carrier and international models)
- SAR: 0.32 W/kg (head); 1.09 W/kg (body)

The Samsung Galaxy A10 is an entry-level Android-based smartphone developed by Samsung Electronics. Three variants were launched under this model, which includes: the base model (known as the Galaxy A10; announced on February 28, 2019), the smaller variant (known as the Galaxy A10e; announced on June 13, 2019), and a slightly upgraded variant (known as the Galaxy A10s; announced on August 12, 2019). All three variants were released with Android 9 (Pie) (and the first version of One UI).

== Specifications ==
=== Hardware ===
The Samsung Galaxy A10 has a 6.2-inch HD+ Infinity-V Display with a 720×1520 resolution. The phone itself measures 155.6 mm × 75.6 mm × 7.9 mm and weighs 168 g. It is powered by an Octa-core (2x1.6 GHz Cortex-A73 & 6x1.35 GHz Cortex-A53) CPU and a Mali-G71 MP2 GPU. It has 32 GB internal storage, expandable up to 512 GB via MicroSD and 2 GB RAM. It has a non-removable 3400 mAh battery.

=== Software ===
The Samsung Galaxy A10 launched with Android 9 (Pie) with Samsung's One UI skin. In May 2020, it received Android 10, with One UI 2, and in August 2021, it was upgraded to Android 11 along with One UI 3. In 2023 Samsung has dropped support for the A10.
