= Ultra wide angle lens =

Camera lens with a very short focal length

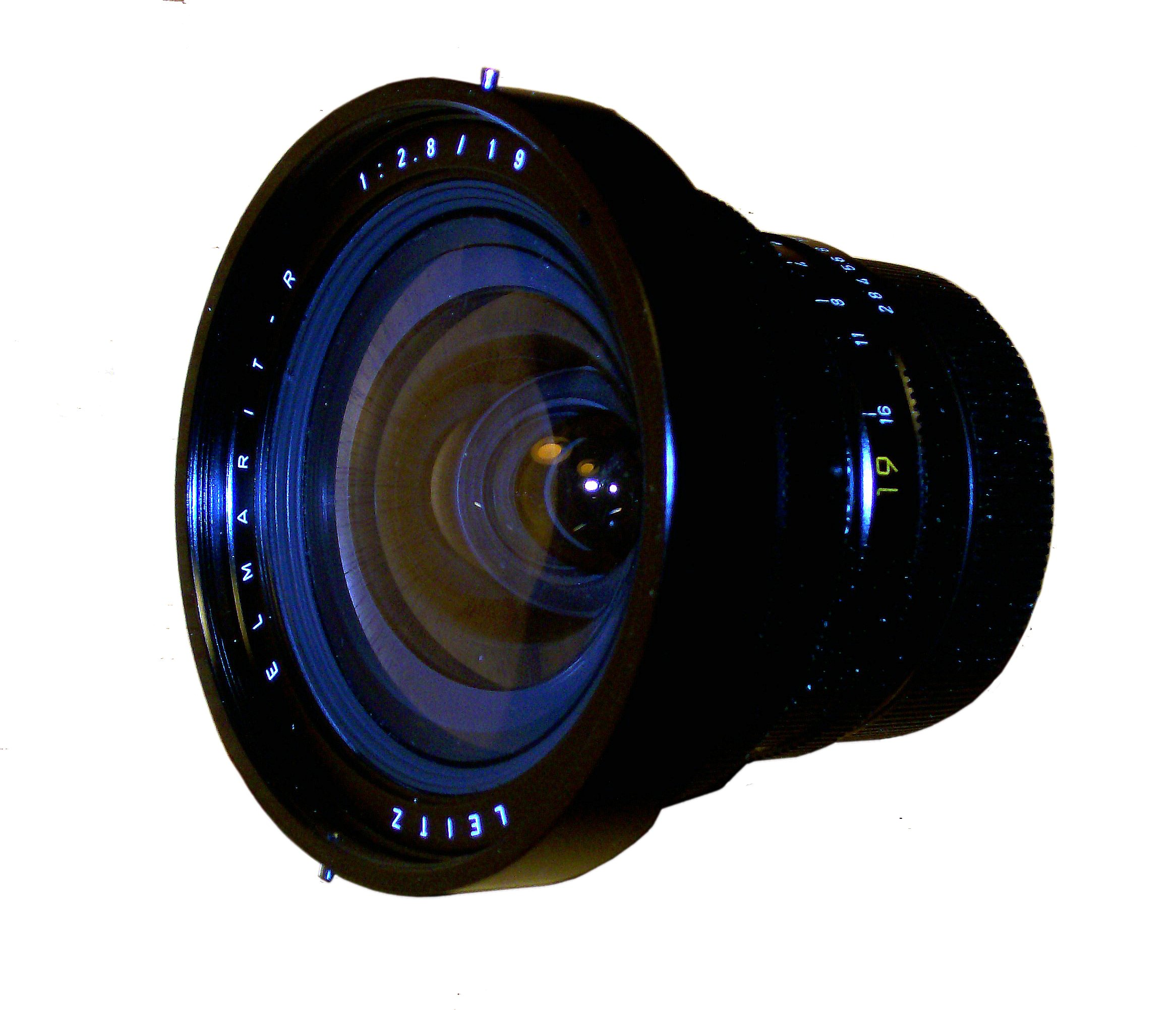
Leitz Elmarit-R 19/2.8 ultra-wide angle lens for Leica R cameras

An ultra-wide angle lens is a lens whose focal length is shorter than that of an average wide-angle lens, providing an even wider angle of view.

== Classification ==
The term ultra-wide angle lens refers to a range of focal lengths which vary according to the size of the sensor or film format of the camera in question; the generally-accepted definition is a lens that covers more than a 24 mm lens on "full-frame" 35mm film is considered an ultra-wide angle lens. Equivalently, this can be stated that a lens with an angle of view greater than 84° on the diagonal, which is the coverage of a 24 mm lens on 35mm film, is an ultra-wide angle lens. Alternatively, a conventional wide-angle lens has an angle of view that ranges from 62 to 84° and an ultra-wide angle lens, in comparison, has an angle of view from 94 to 118°. Based on these definitions, the focal lengths for an ultra-wide angle lens can be computed for several popular film and image sensor formats.

Ultra-wide angle lens focal lengths and diagonal angle of view
Sensor / format		Definition 1		Definition 2	
Name	Diag.	Min. angle	Max. focal length	Angles	Focal lengths
1"	15.9 mm (0.6 in)	> 84°	< 8.8 mm	94 – 118°	4.8–7.4 mm
4/3"	21.6 mm (0.9 in)	> 84°	< 12 mm	94 – 118°	6.5–10.1 mm
APS-C	28.3 mm (1.1 in)	> 84°	< 15.7 mm	94 – 118°	8.5–13.2 mm
35mm	43.3 mm (1.7 in)	> 84°	< 24 mm	94 – 118°	13–20 mm
6×4.5	70 mm (2.8 in)	> 84°	< 39 mm	94 – 118°	21–33 mm
6×6	79.2 mm (3.1 in)	> 84°	< 44 mm	94 – 118°	24–37 mm
6×7	89.6 mm (3.5 in)	> 84°	< 50 mm	94 – 118°	27–42 mm
4×5	154.5 mm (6.1 in)	> 84°	< 86 mm	94 – 118°	46–72 mm
5×7	208.7 mm (8.2 in)	> 84°	< 116 mm	94 – 118°	63–97 mm
8×10	312 mm (12.3 in)	> 84°	< 173 mm	94 – 118°	94–145 mm
20×24	1,010 mm (39.8 in)	> 84°	< 560 mm	94 – 118°	300–470 mm

Ultra-wide angle lenses

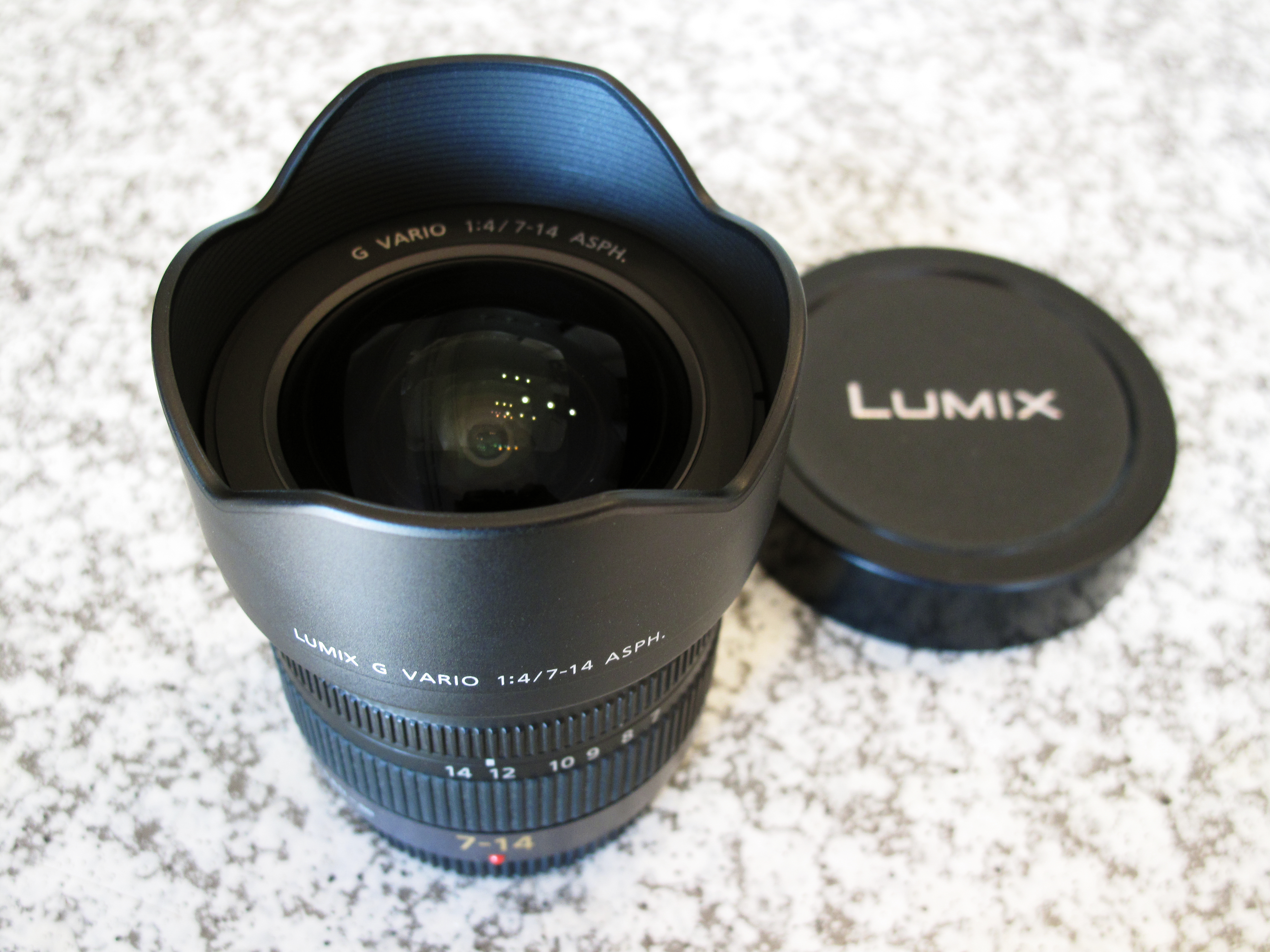
Panasonic Lumix G Vario 1:4/7–14 mm Asph.

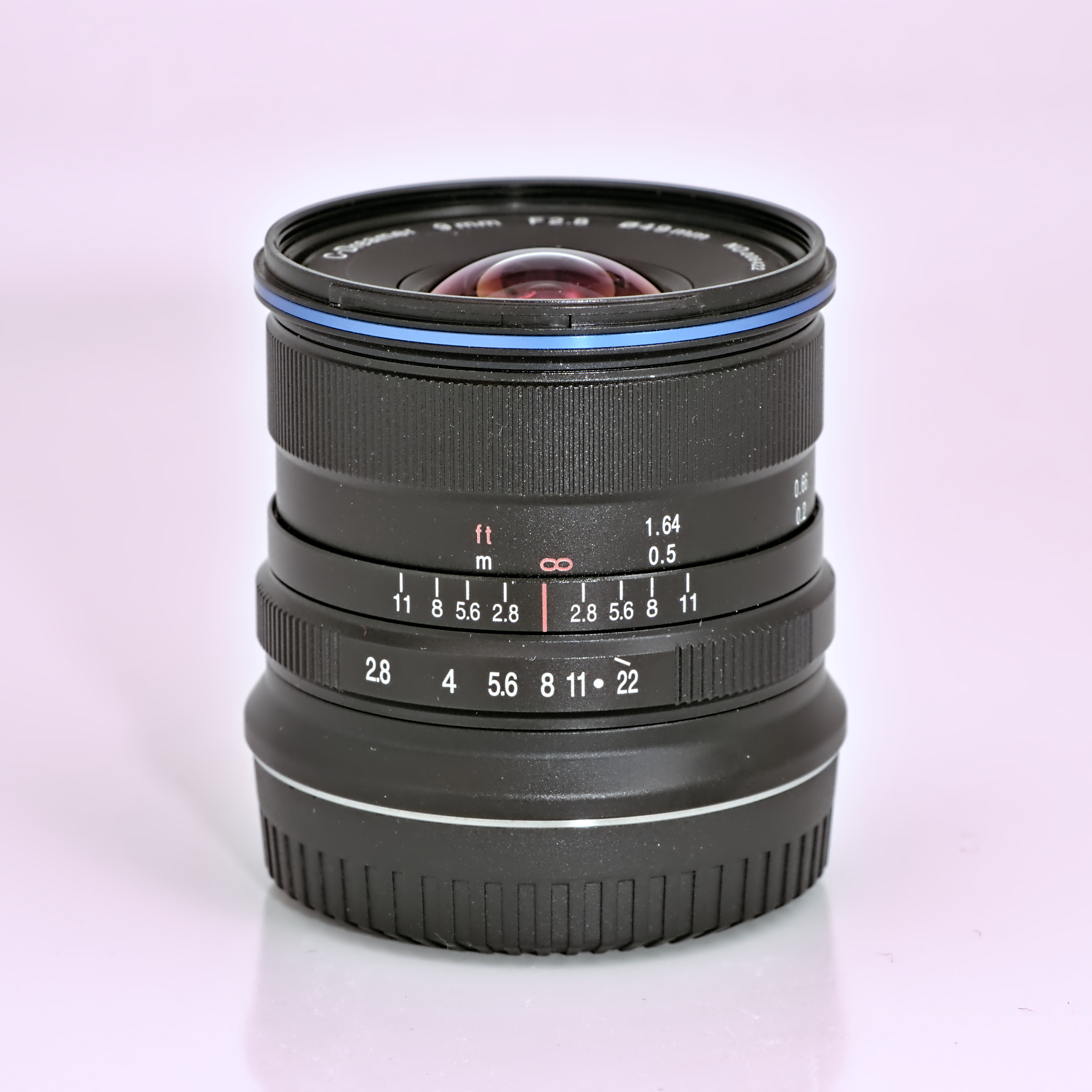
Laowa C-Dreamer 9 mm f/2.8

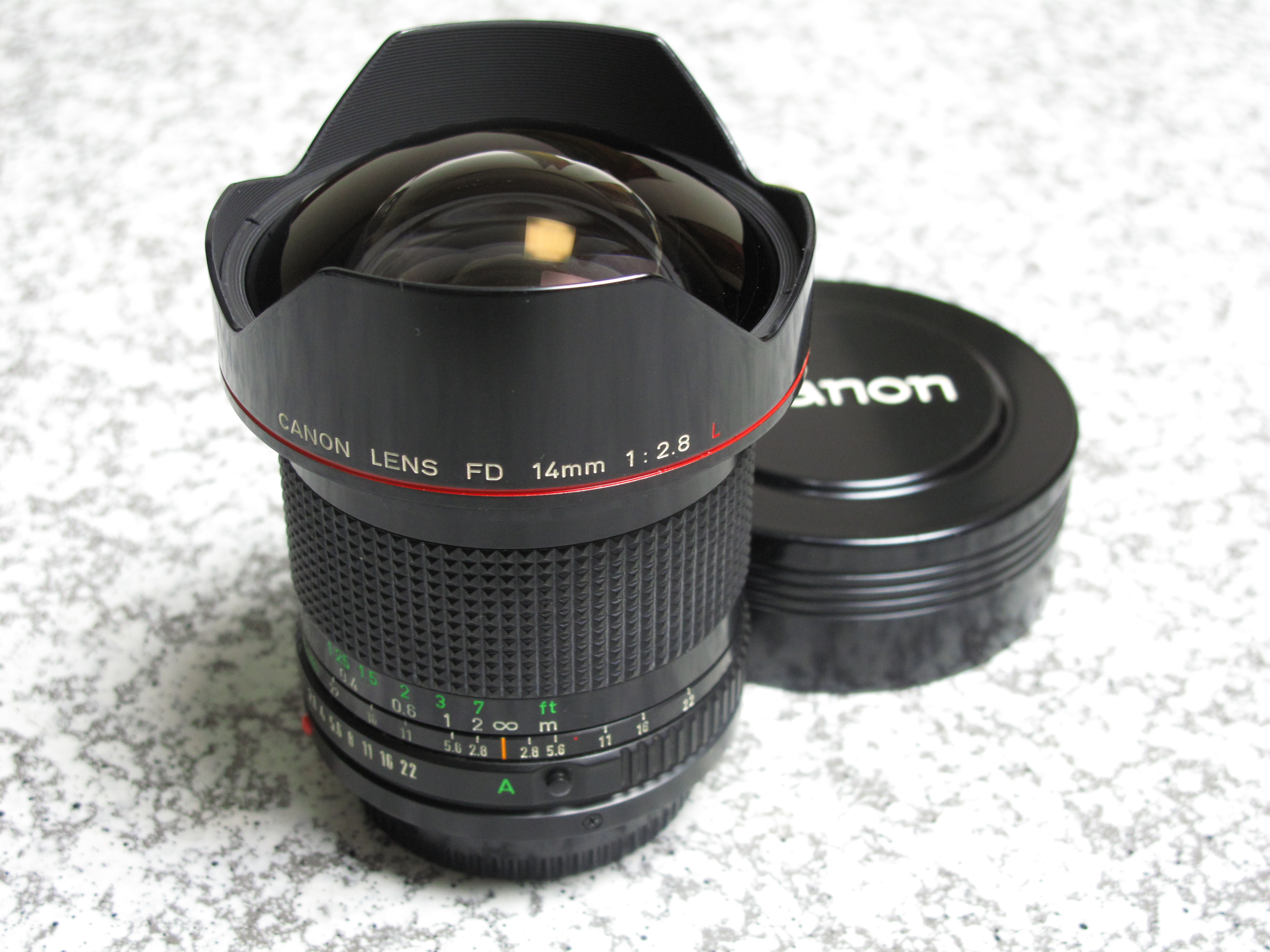
Canon New FD 14 mm 1:2.8 L

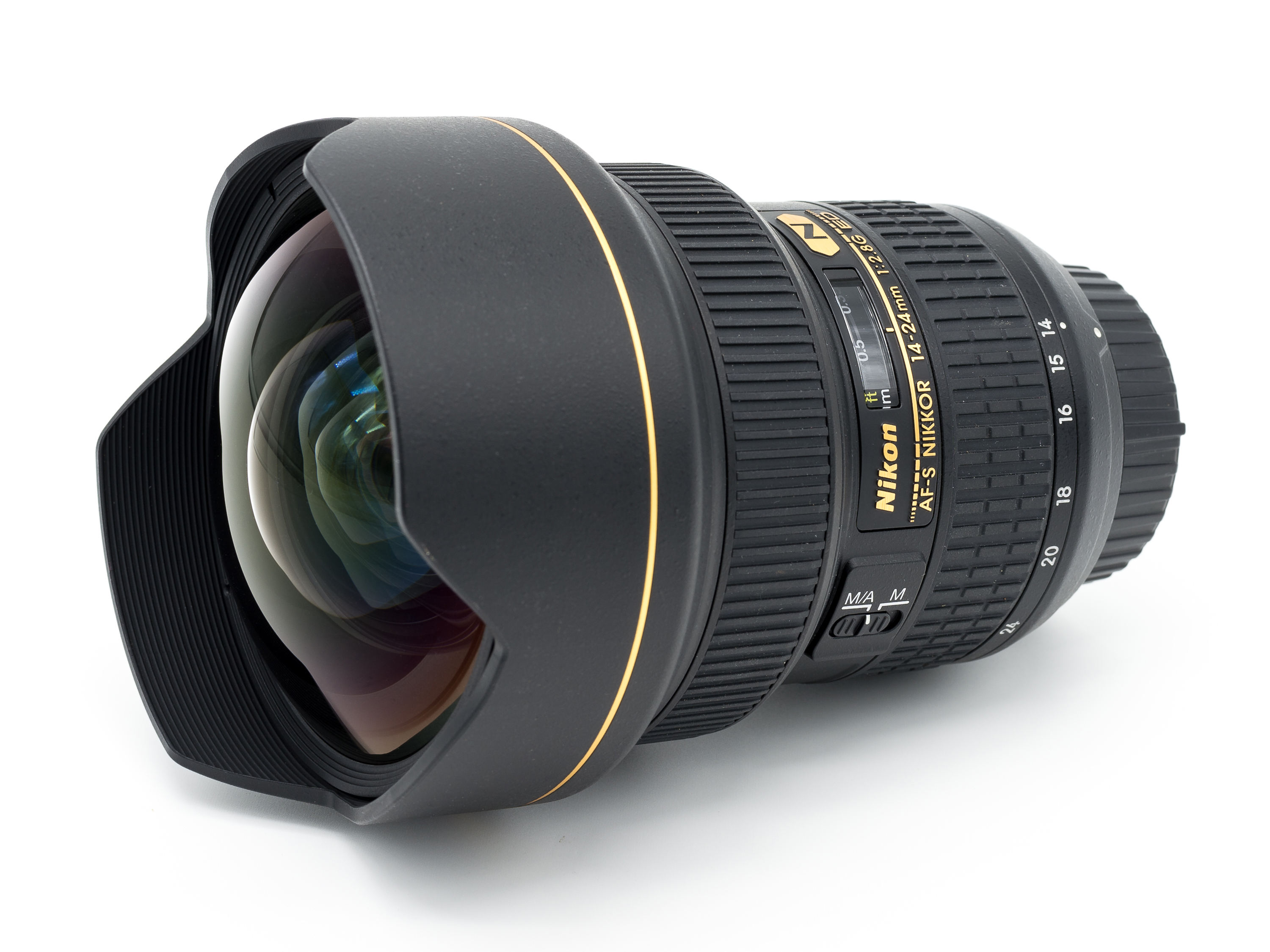
Nikkor 14–24 mm 1:2.8G ED

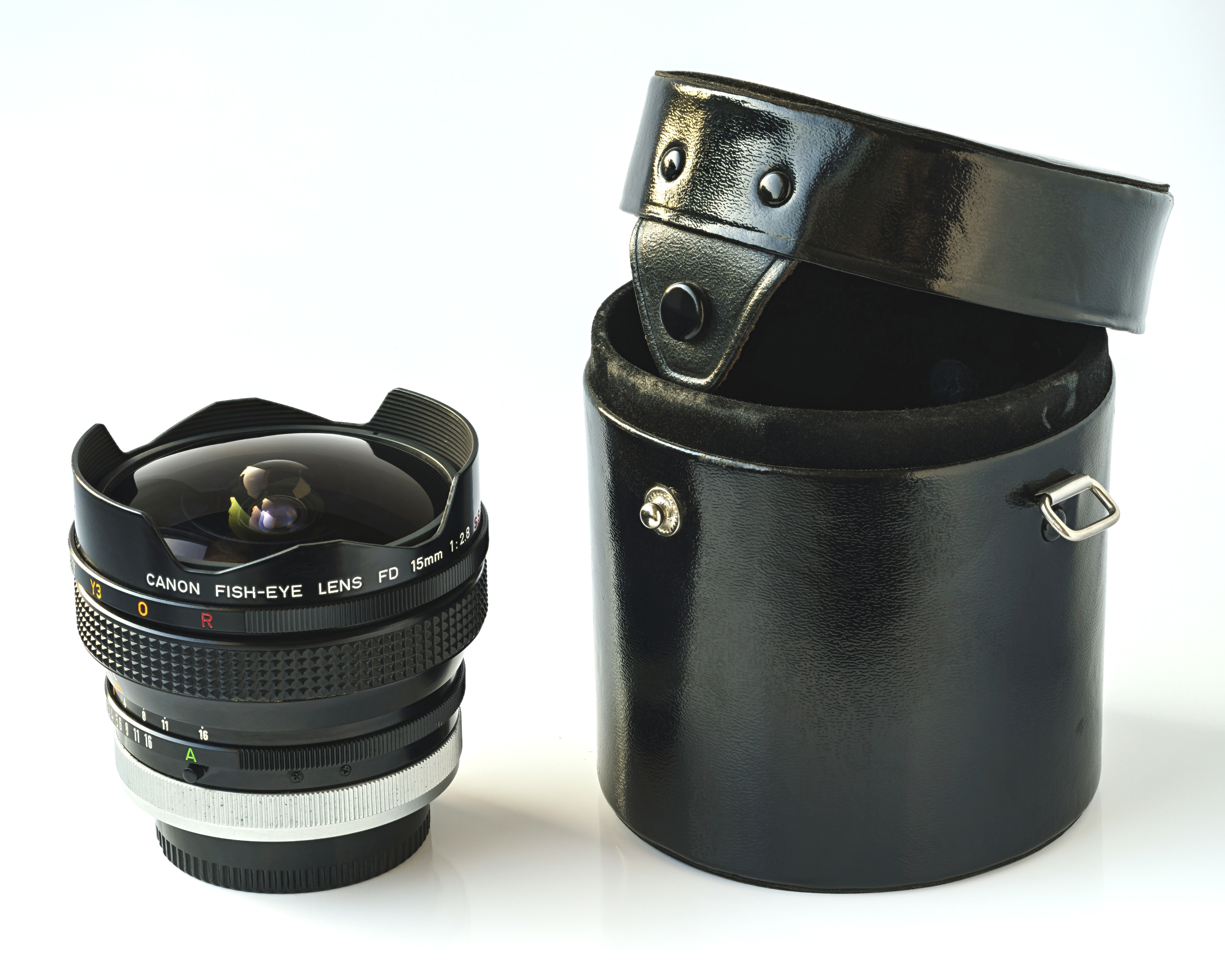
Canon Fish-eye Lens FD 15 mm 1:2.8 S.S.C.

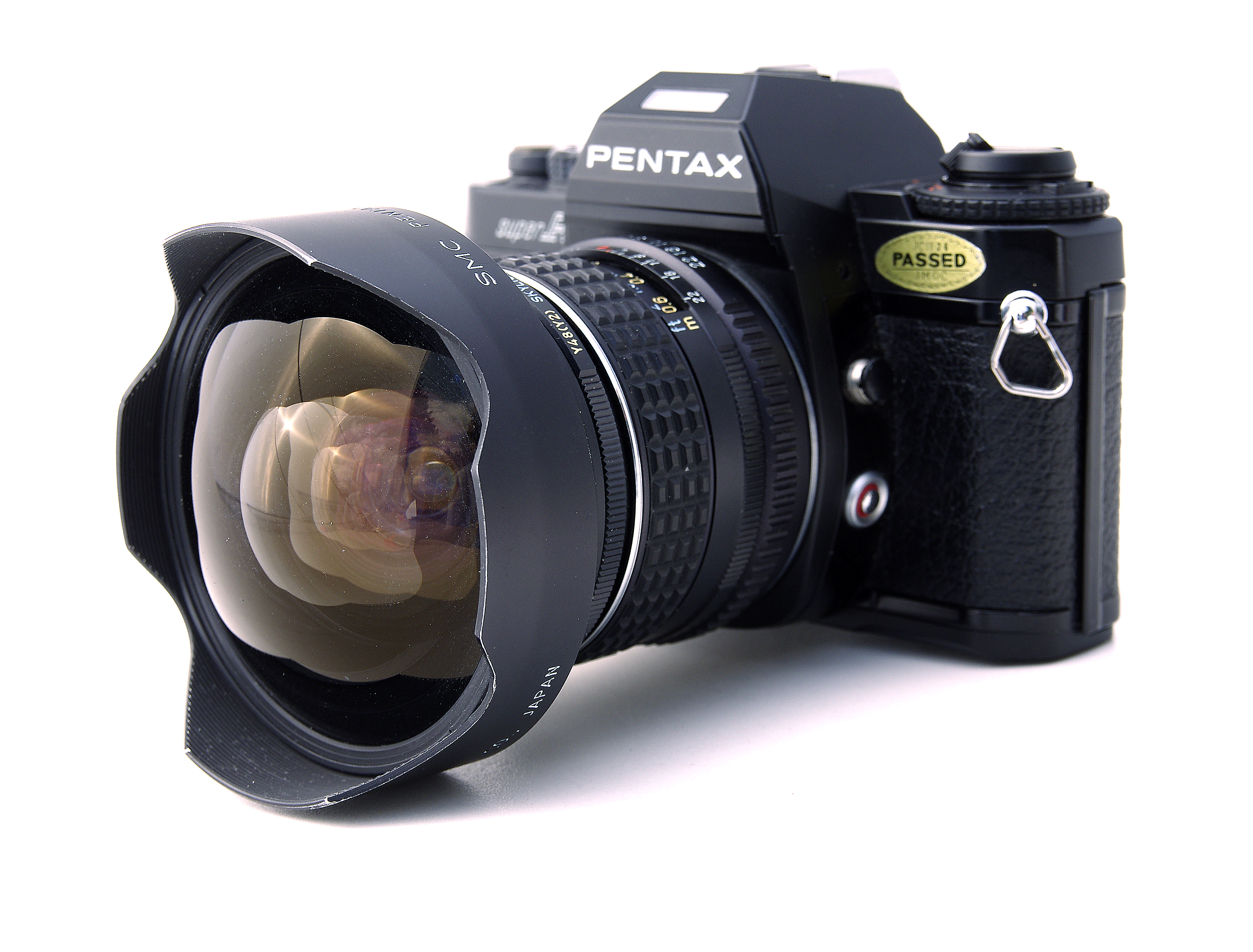
Pentax Super A with SMC Pentax 15 mm 1:3.5

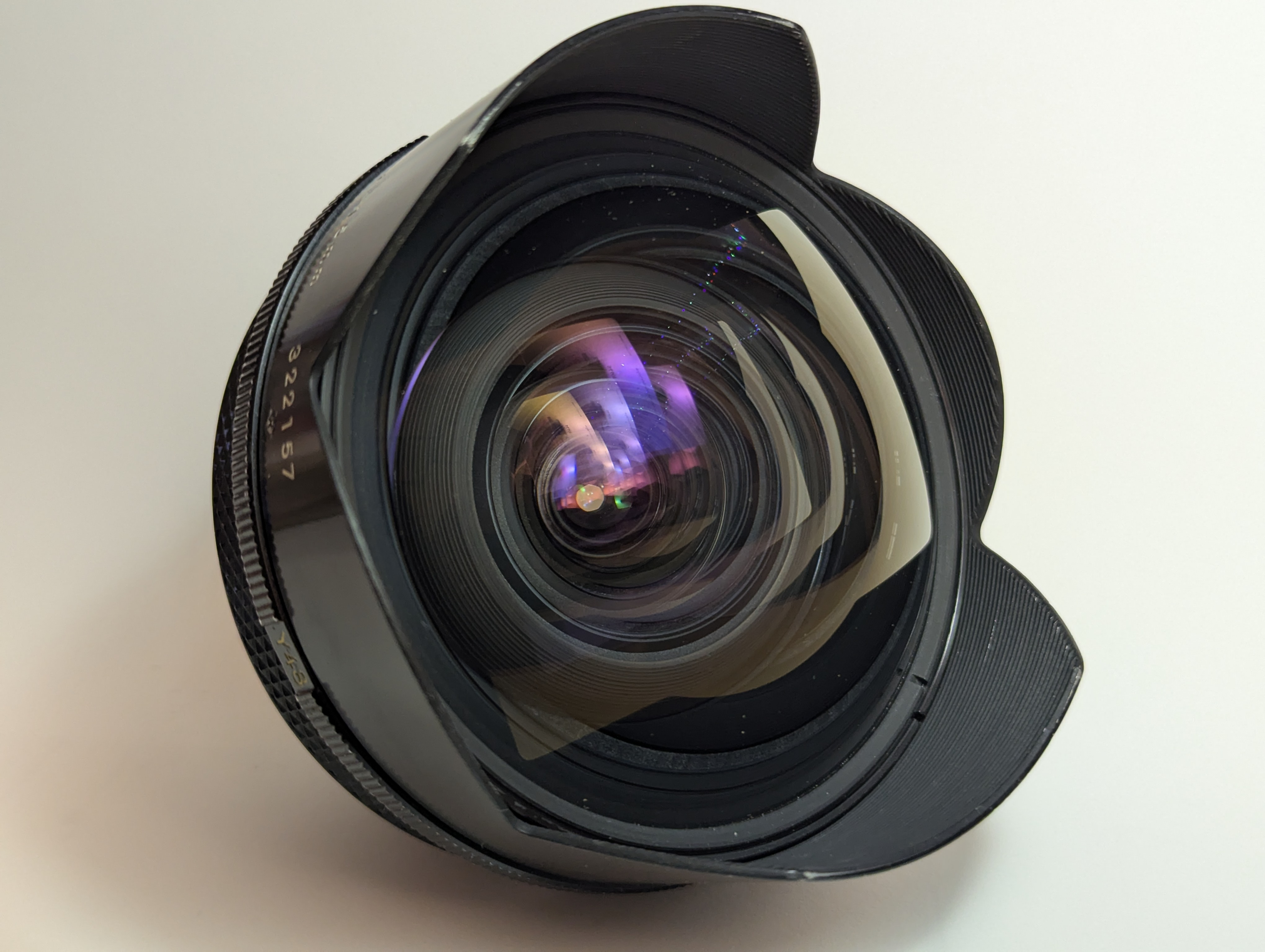
Nikkor-QD.C 15 mm 1:5.6

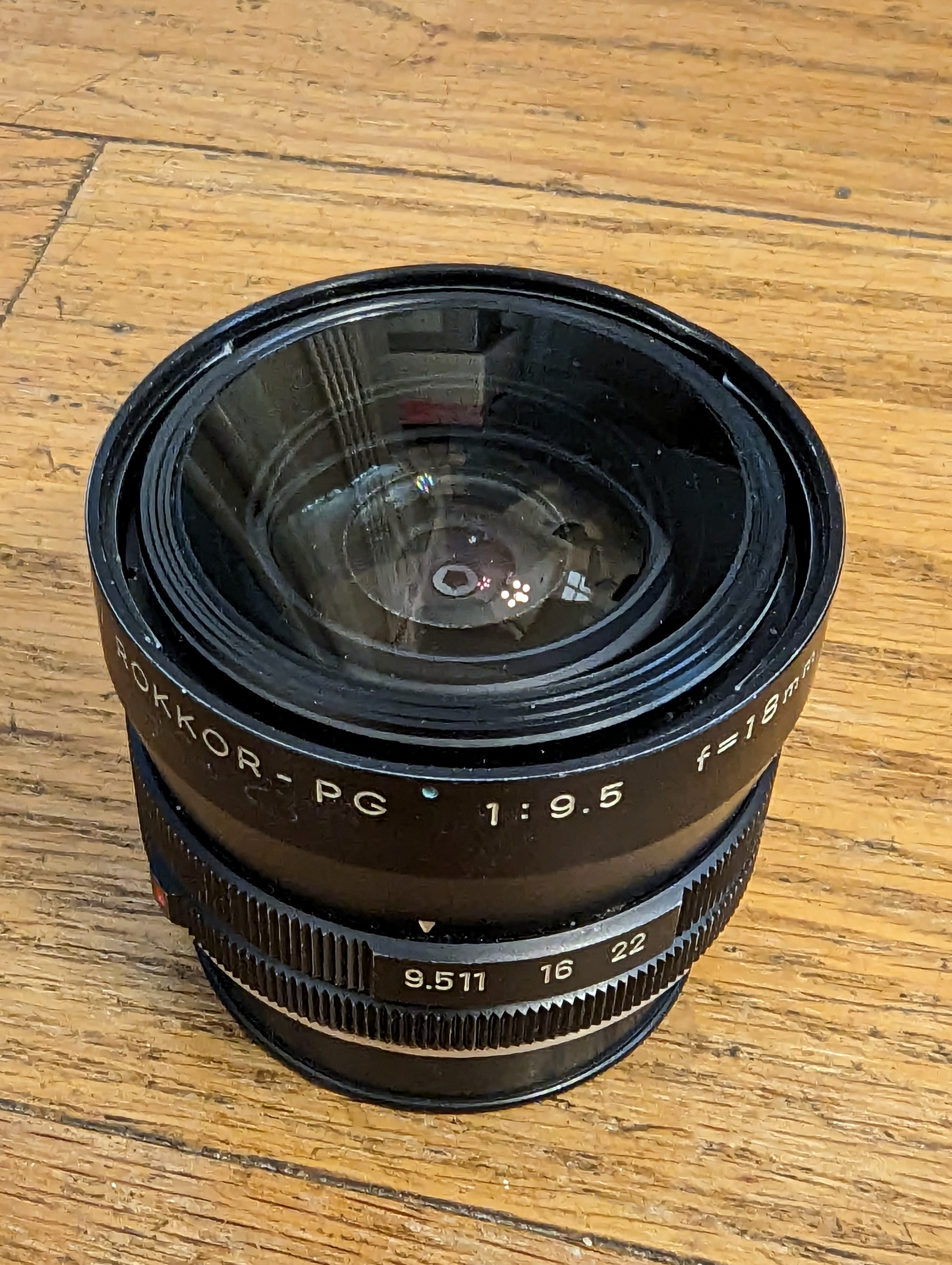
UW Rokkor-PG 1:9.5 f=18 mm

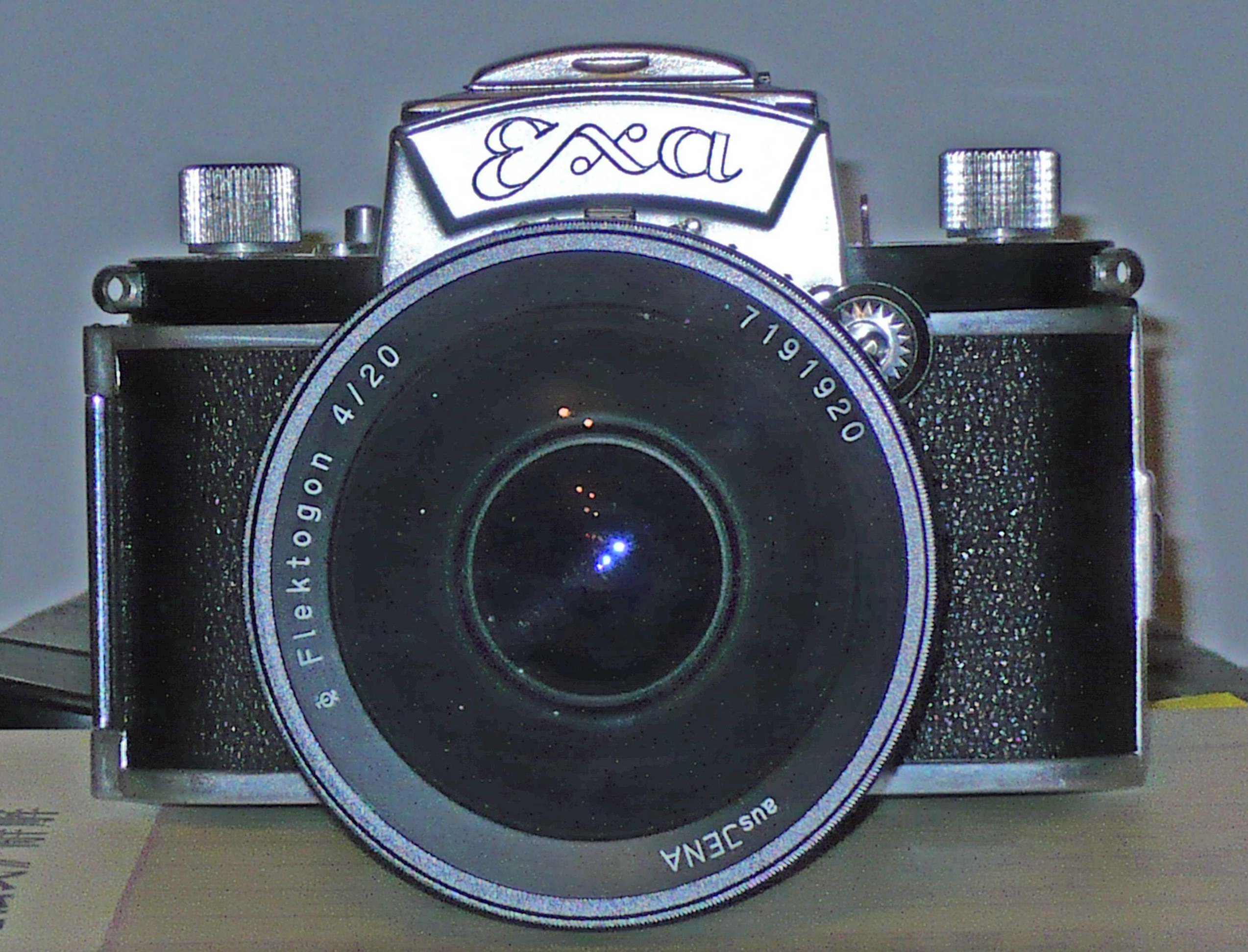
Ihagee Exa camera with Carl Zeiss Jena Flektogon 1:4 20 mm

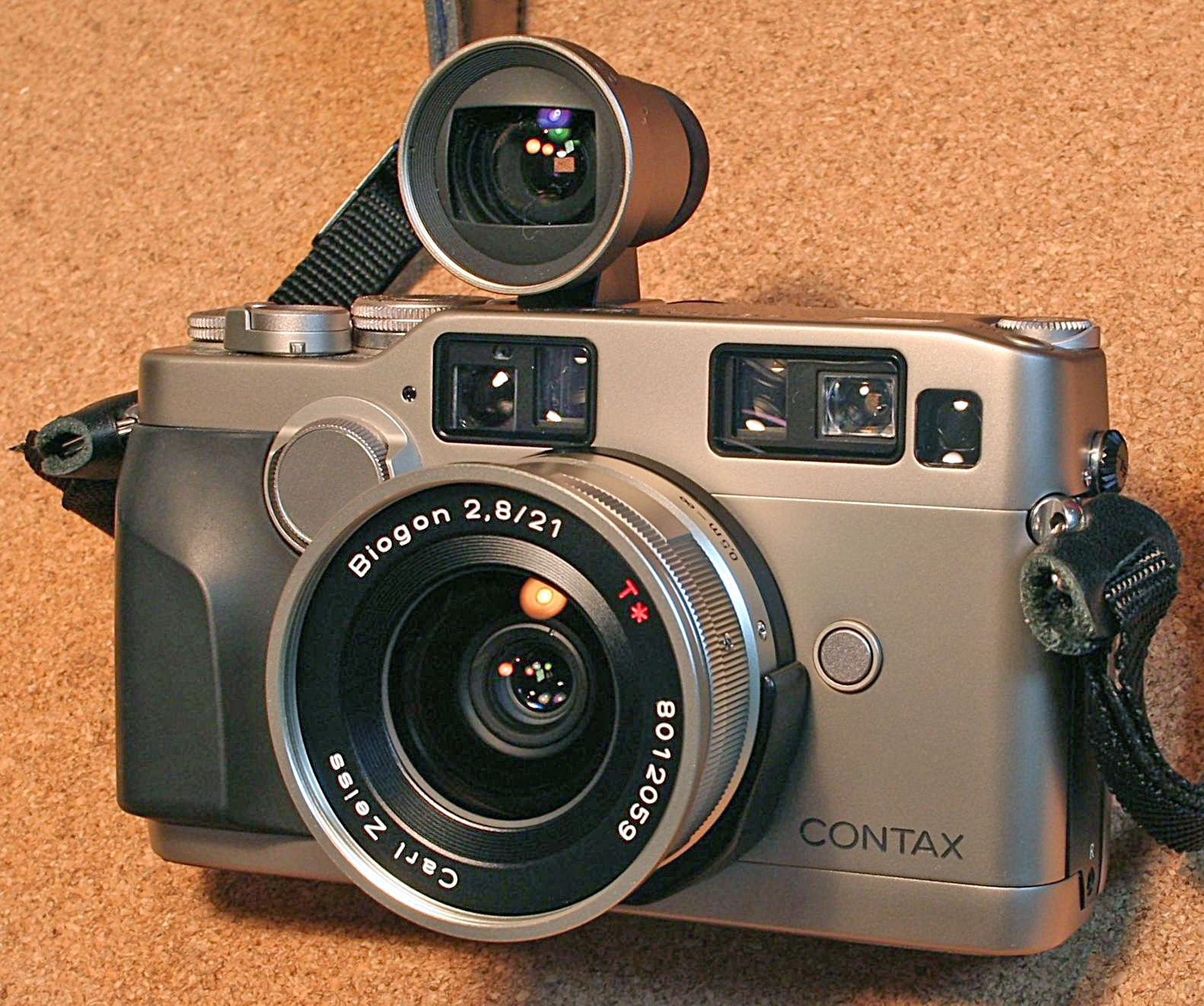
Contax G2 with Carl Zeiss Biogon 2.8/21 mm

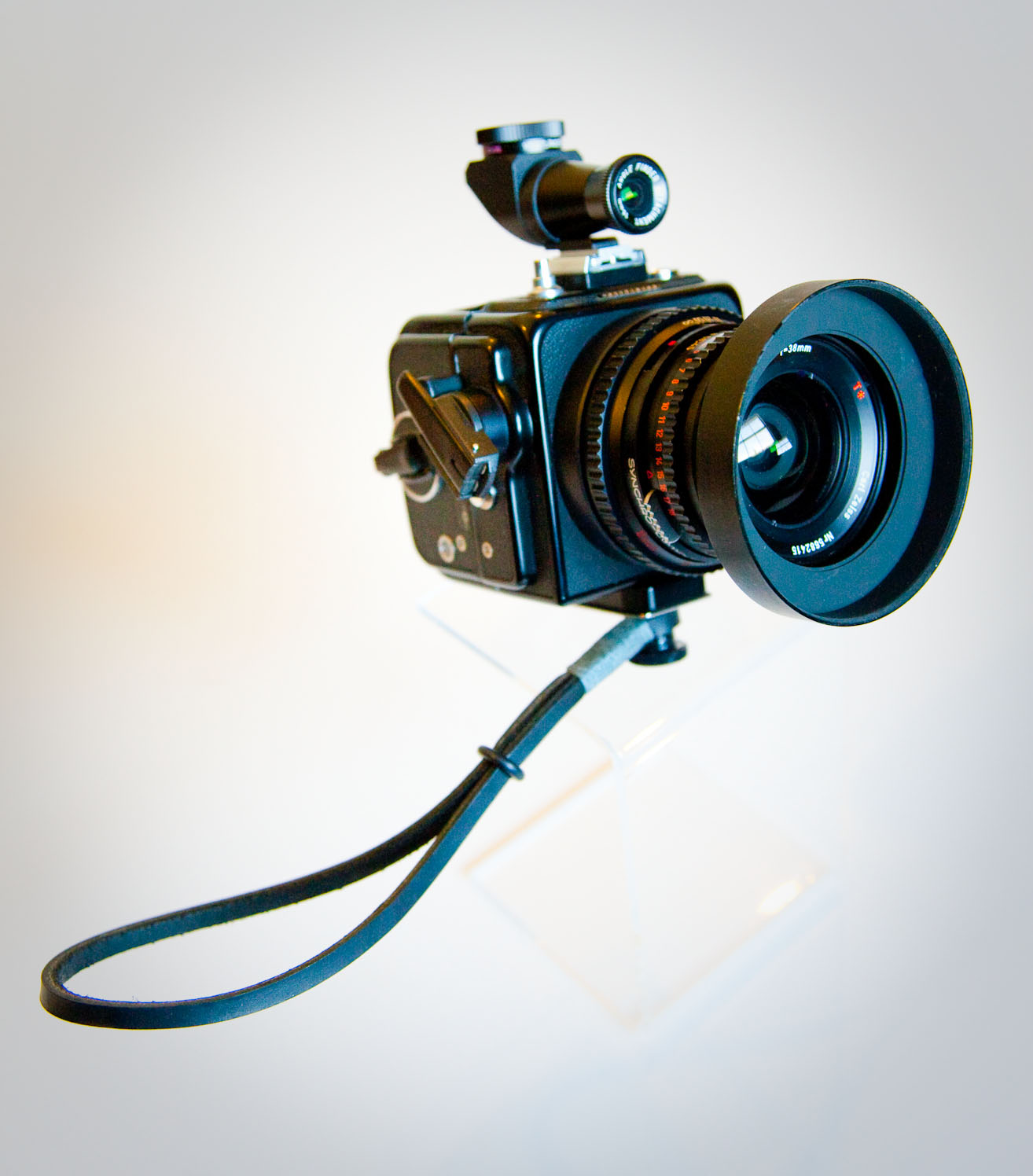
Hasselblad SWC/M with Zeiss Biogon 4.5/38 mm

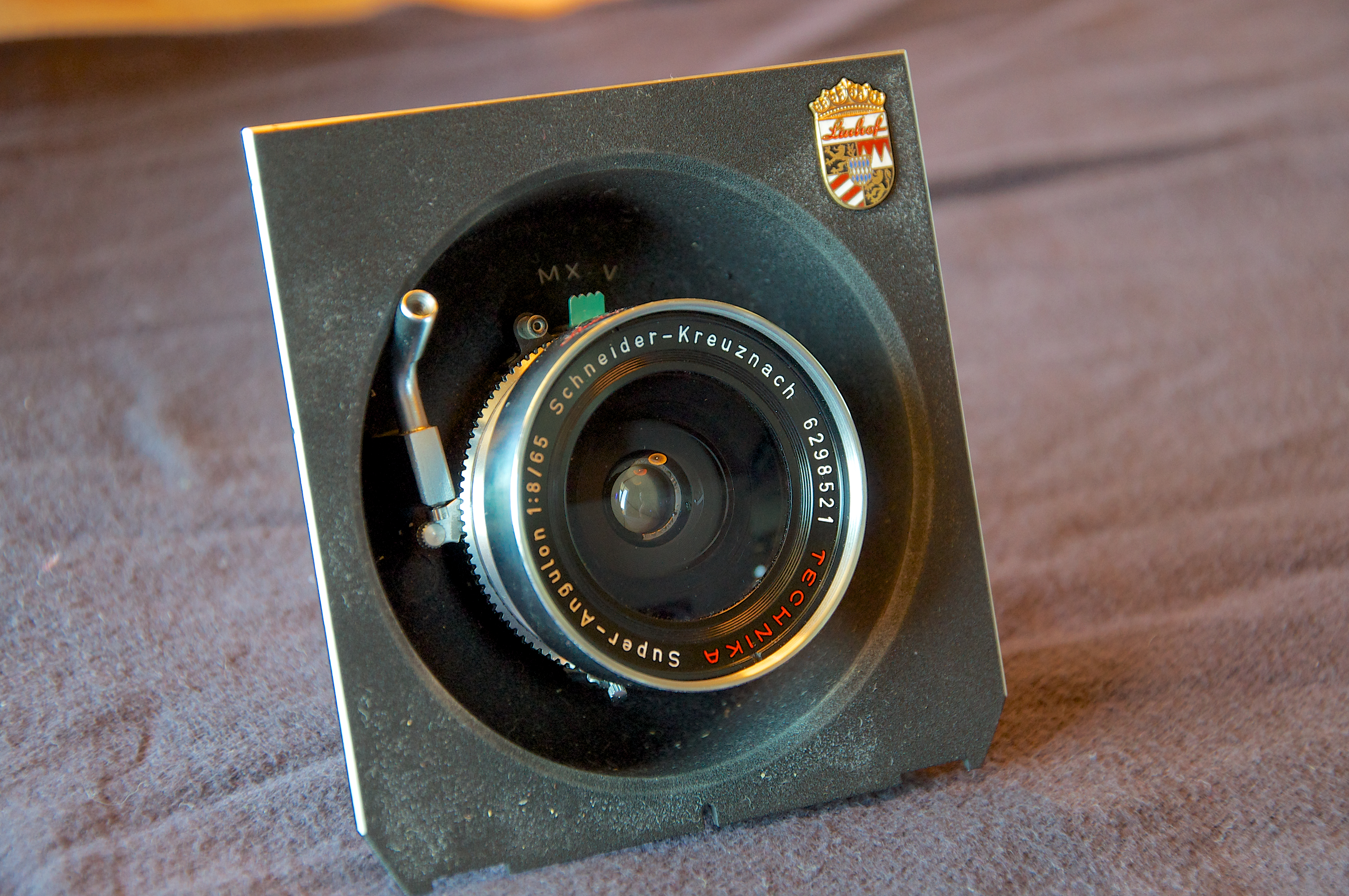
Schneider-Kreuznach Super-Angulon 1:8/65 mm

=== 'Fisheye' and rectilinear lenses ===
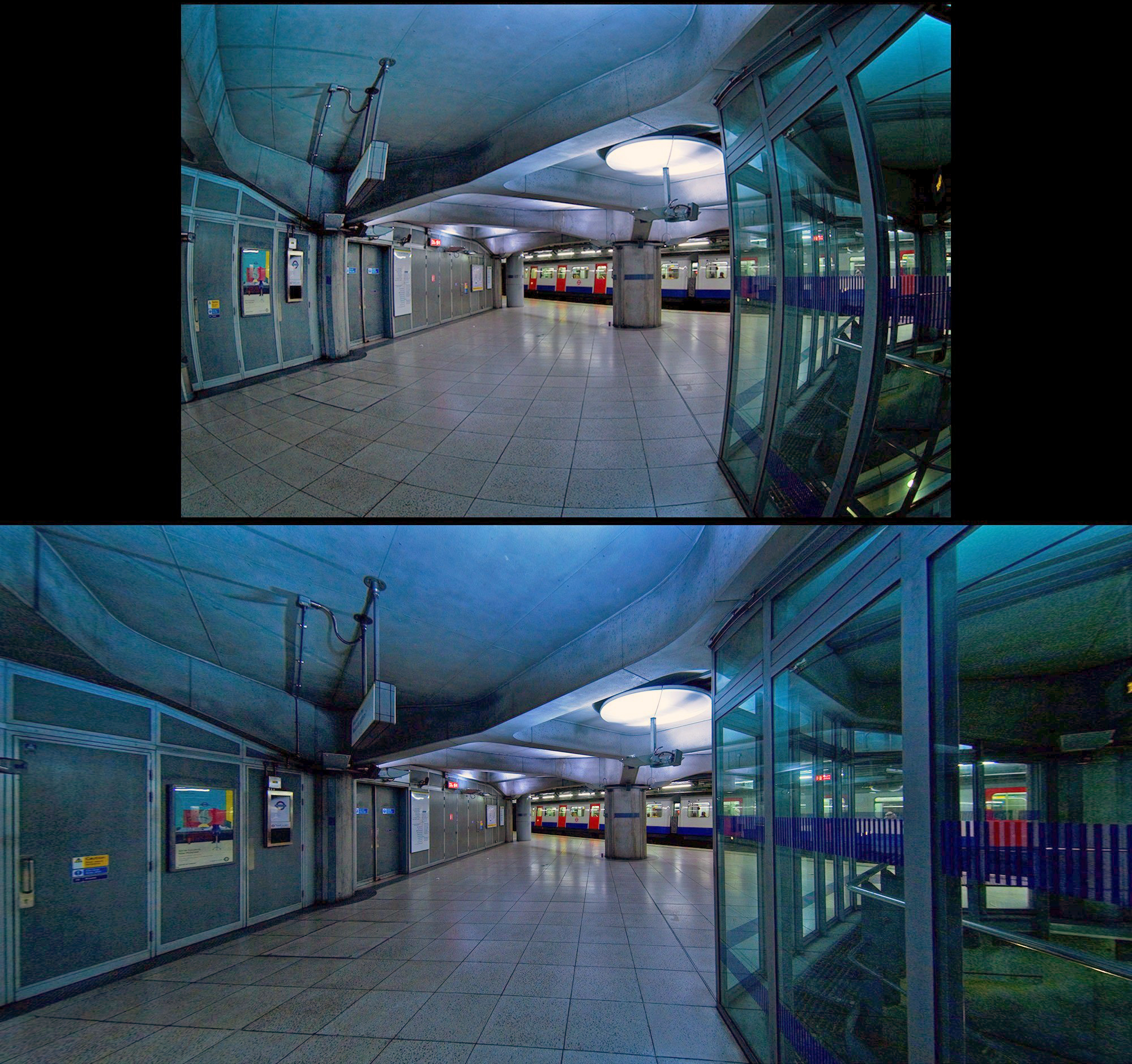
Curvilinear (above) and software-corrected rectilinear (below) versions of the same image. Notice the barrel distortion typical for fisheye lenses in the curvilinear image. While this example has been rectilinear-corrected by software, high-quality wide-angle lenses are built with optical rectilinear correction.

Ultra-wide angle lenses come in two varieties: Fisheye lenses with curvilinear barrel distortion, and rectilinear lenses which are designed so that straight lines in the scene will render straight (uncurved) in the photographic image and thus lack the extreme barrel distortion that is characteristic of a fisheye lens. Neither denotes a particular range of focal lengths, the difference is only whether distortion is present or not. However, the shorter the focal length, the more difficult it is to implement rectilinear correction.

The mapping function defines the position of an object relative to the center of the image, r, as a function of the focal length of the lens, f, and the angle from the optical axis θ, which is half of the angle of view. Since rectilinear lenses have a mapping function that depends on the tangent function, $r = f \cdot \tan{\theta}$, θ cannot exceed 90°, which means the angle of view of a rectilinear lens cannot exceed 180°. For most practical lenses, the angle of view is limited to around 120 to 130°. In contrast, the typical mapping function of a fisheye lens is $r = f \cdot \theta$, making the fisheye capable of capturing a 180° or greater angle of view.

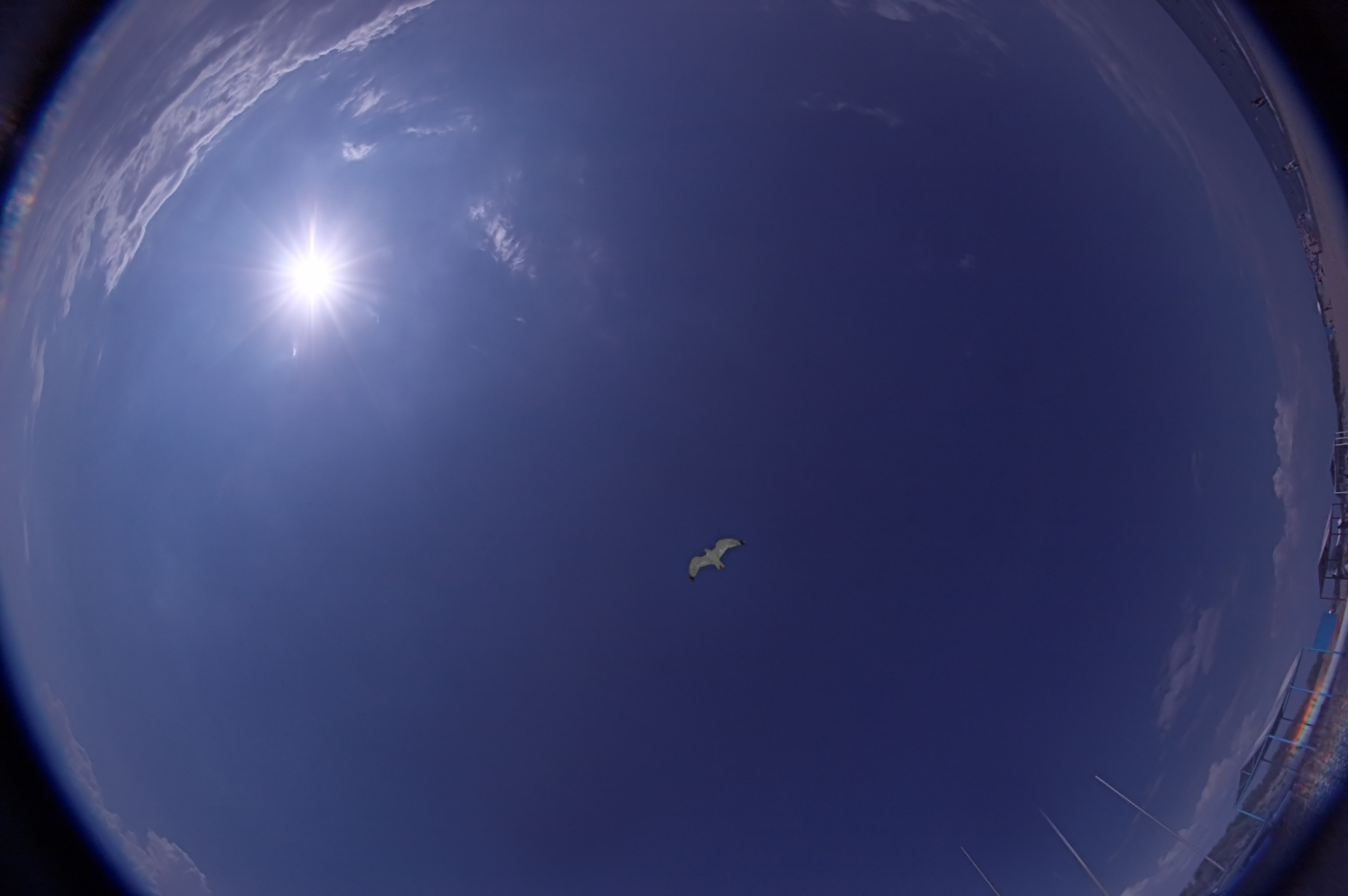
Peleng 8/3.5 fisheye. A capture of an entire scene, including the sun is shown (180-degree circular fisheye). The underside of the seagull is illuminated by flash.

In fisheye lenses, the visual angle is close to or more than 180 degrees in at least one direction. For example, a "diagonal fish eye" would have a viewing angle of at least 180 degrees within the diagonals of the frame. A "circular fisheye" would represent the image in the form of a circle.

Rectilinear ultra-wide angle lenses are used in photography and cinematography sometimes to achieve three-dimensional perspective distortion instead of simply two-dimensional barrel distortion. A notable, signature employment for this purpose is frequently seen in the films of Terry Gilliam, for instance.

=== Development ===
The oldest "lenses", pinholes, used in pinhole cameras, provide a rectilinear rendering. In images made using this technique, there is little or no distortion due to the rectilinear propagation of light. For a long time it was thought that only symmetrical optical formulas could ensure the geometrically precise transfer of light without distortion becoming apparent near the edge of images (as the viewing angle increases). However, with modern technology and understanding of optics, ultra-wide angle lenses can these days eliminate distortion almost completely.

Smartphones began incorporating ultra-wide angle lenses on rear cameras in the mid 2010s. The first models were LG’s G5 and V20 in 2016.

== Features ==
=== Larger depth of field (DOF) ===
The depth of field afforded by an ultra-wide angle lens is very great. Therefore, the photographer has the ability to keep much or almost all of the scene in focus, with respect to the hyperfocal distance of the lens.

=== Better aperture setting ===
Thanks to the small focal length, these lenses can shoot longer exposures without fear of camera shake in the image. (In longer lenses camera shake is multiplied by the zoom factor, but in shorter lenses it is much less apparent). This means that the photographer can afford to use a much smaller aperture if they choose, and still retain a balanced image.

=== Framing challenges ===
With such an expansive angle of view and consequent coverage, it can be very difficult to keep undesired objects, such as light sources or even the photographer's fingers or feet, out of the image. However this does not always pose a problem, as even the sun in a photograph takes up such a small amount of space that its presence can often have little negative impact on the overall composition. Sources of light may induce internal reflections, rendered as lens flare, which may or may not be desired.

=== Use of filters ===
When using an ultra-wide angle lens, the sky often constitutes a very large portion of the frame, and may need to be darkened for the image to appear balanced. This is often achieved through the use of a gradient filter. Note that a polarizing filter, which also darkens the sky, will often give uneven results when used on an ultra-wide angle lens.

For some ultra-wide angle lenses, such as the Zeiss Hologon and the Goerz Hypergon, natural vignetting (radial darkening due to the cos^{4} law) may require a center-graduated filter for even exposure. Many ultra-wide lenses have visibly bulbous front elements, which may make it challenging to attach a conventional flat filter to the lens front; in those cases, the lens may have provisions to attach a filter to the rear, or may have a built-in filter turret.

=== Perspective ===
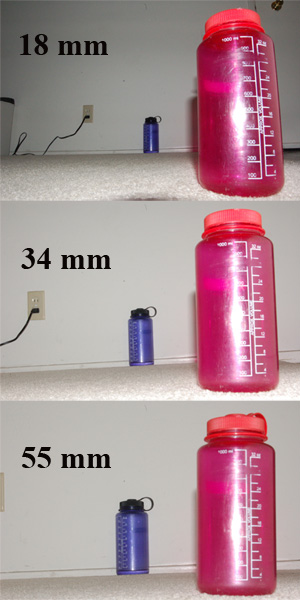
How focal length affects perspective: 18 mm (ultra-wide angle), 34 mm (wide-angle), and 55 mm (normal lens) at identical field size achieved by different camera-subject distances. Notice that the shorter the focal length and the wider the angle of view, perspective distortion and size differences change.

Longer lenses magnify the subject more, apparently compressing distance and (when focused on the foreground) blurring the background. Wider lenses tend to magnify distance between objects.

Another result of using a wide-angle lens is a greater apparent perspective distortion when the camera is not aligned perpendicularly to the subject: parallel lines converge at the same rate as with a normal lens, but converge more due to the wider total field. For example, buildings appear to be falling backwards much more severely when the camera is pointed upward from ground level than they would if photographed with a normal lens at the same distance from the subject, because more of the subject building is visible in the wide-angle shot.

Because different lenses generally require a different camera–subject distance to preserve the size of a subject, changing the angle of view can indirectly distort perspective, changing the apparent relative size of the subject and foreground.

Photographs taken with Sigma 10–20 mm lens

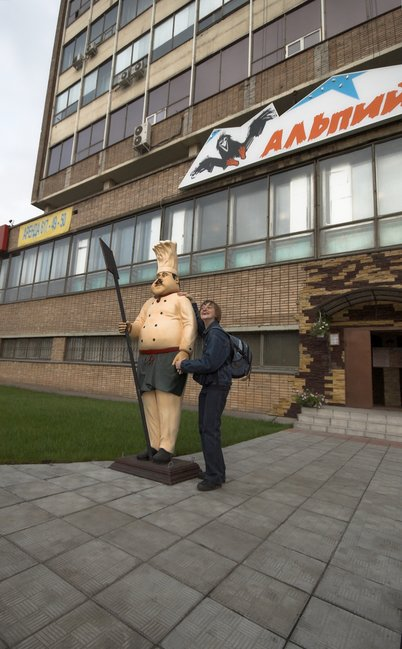
This is a rectilinear lens as obvious by the lack of distortion of straight lines

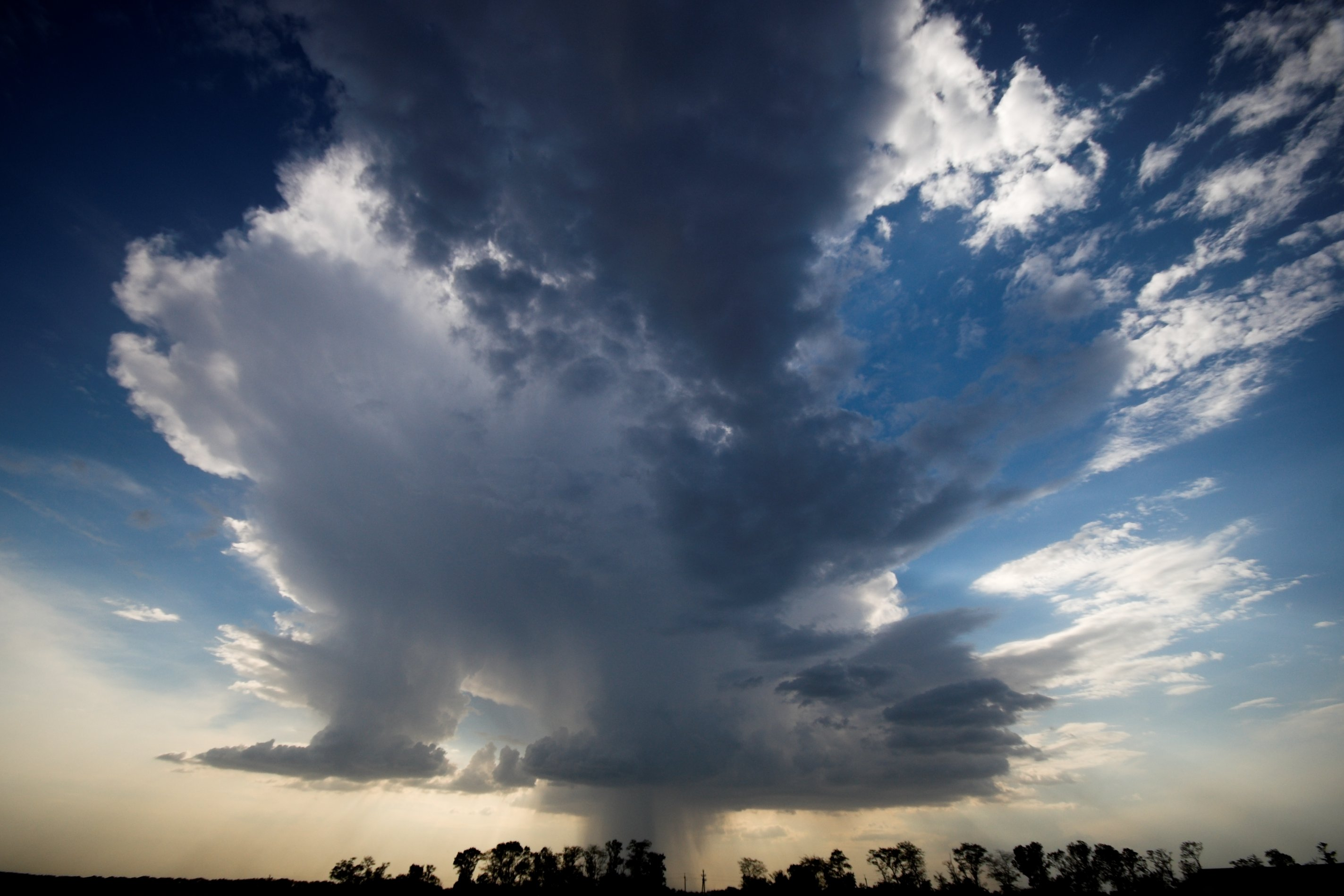
Sky, exhibiting some of the characteristics often found in images taken with an ultra-wide -angle lens

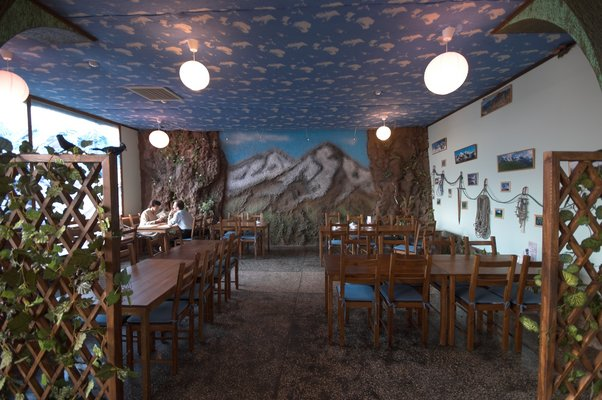
Interior space; distortion can be seen on spherical objects, which become elongated.

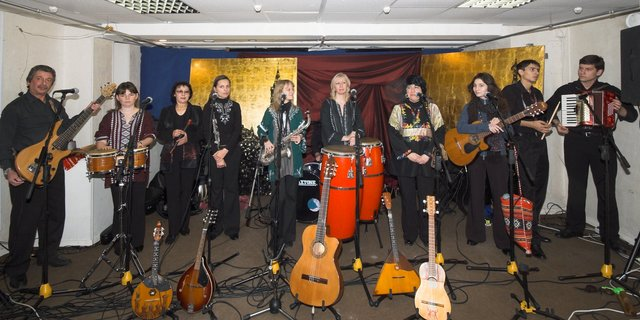
People with the characteristic distortion to the edges of the image
