= Samsung Galaxy M22 =

Android-based smartphone

- Brand: Samsung Galaxy
- Manufacturer: Samsung Electronics
- Type: Smartphone
- Series: Galaxy M series
- First released: September 14, 2021; 5 years ago
- Predecessor: Samsung Galaxy M21
- Successor: Samsung Galaxy M23 5G
- Related: Samsung Galaxy A22; Samsung Galaxy M02; Samsung Galaxy M12; Samsung Galaxy M32; Samsung Galaxy M42 5G; Samsung Galaxy M52 5G
- Compatible networks: GSM / HSPA / LTE
- Form factor: Slate
- Dimensions: 159.9 mm (6.30 in) H 74 mm (2.9 in) W 8.4 mm (0.33 in) D
- Weight: 186 g (6.6 oz)
- Operating system: Android 11 with One UI 3.1
- System-on-chip: Mediatek Helio G80 (12 nm)
- CPU: Octa-core (2x2.0 GHz Cortex-A75 & 6x1.8 GHz Cortex-A55)
- GPU: Mali-G52 MC2
- Memory: 4 GB, 6 GB
- Storage: 64GB, 128GB
- SIM: Dual Nano-SIM
- Battery: 5000mAh
- Charging: Fast charging 25W
- Rear camera: 48 MP, f/2.0, (wide), PDAF, OIS; 8 MP, f/2.2, 123˚ (ultrawide), 1/4.0", 1.12 μm 2 MP, f/2.4, (macro); 2 MP, f/2.4, (depth); LED flash, panorama, HDR; 1080p@30fps
- Front camera: 13 MP, f/2.2, (wide), 1/3.1", 1.12 μm 1080p@30fps
- Display: 6.4 in (160 mm), Infinity-U Display, 720 x 1600 resolution, 20:9 aspect ratio (~274 ppi density); Super AMOLED, 90Hz refresh rate, 600 nits (HDR)
- Sound: Loudspeaker, Ear speaker
- Connectivity: Wi-Fi 802.11 a/b/g/n/ac, dual-band, Wi-Fi Direct, hotspot Bluetooth 5.0, A2DP, LE
- Data inputs: Multi-touch screen USB Type-C 2.0; Fingerprint scanner

The Samsung Galaxy M22 is an Android-based smartphone by Samsung. It is a part of Samsung Galaxy M series. This phone was announced on September 14, 2021.

== Specifications ==
=== Hardware ===
The Galaxy M22 is a smartphone with form factor of type slate, whose dimensions are 159.9 × 74 × 8.4 mm and weighs 186 grams.

The device features GSM, HSPA, LTE, Wi-Fi 802.11 connectivity dual-band a/b/g/n/ac with support for Wi-Fi Direct and hotspot, of Bluetooth 5.0 with A2DP and LE, of GPS with A-GPS, BeiDou, Galileo and GLONASS positioning system and NFC. It has Dolby Atmos support. It features a USB-C 2.0 port and a 3.5mm audio jack input.

It features a 6.4-inch diagonal touchscreen capacitive screen, Super AMOLED Infinity-U type, rounded corners and HD+ 720 × 1600 resolution pixel, with a maximum refresh rate of 90 Hz.

The 5000 mAh li-po battery is not removable by the user. Supports fast charging at 25 watts.

The chipset is a MediaTek Helio G80 with CPU octa core (2 cores at 2 GHz + 6 cores at 1.8 GHz ). The internal memory, of type eMMC 5.1, is 128 GB (expandable via microSD up to 1 TB) while the RAM is 4 GB.

The rear camera has a 48 megapixel main sensor, with f/2.0 aperture, an 8 MP ultra-wide-angle sensor, a 2 MP depth sensor and a 2 MP for the macro, is equipped with autofocus PDAF, HDR and flash LED modes, capable of recording a maximum of Full HD video at 30 frames per second, while the front camera is a single 13 MP, with HDR support and maximum Full HD@30 fps video recording.

=== Software ===
The OS is Android 11, accompanied by user interface One UI Core 3.1.

== Marketing ==
The device was presented on September 14 2021. It is available, after the presentation, on the Samsung Germany website.

== See also ==
- Samsung Galaxy
- Samsung Galaxy M
