= Samsung Galaxy A12 =

2020 Android smartphone by Samsung

Samsung Galaxy A12 Samsung Galaxy A12 Nacho Samsung Galaxy M12 Samsung Galaxy F12

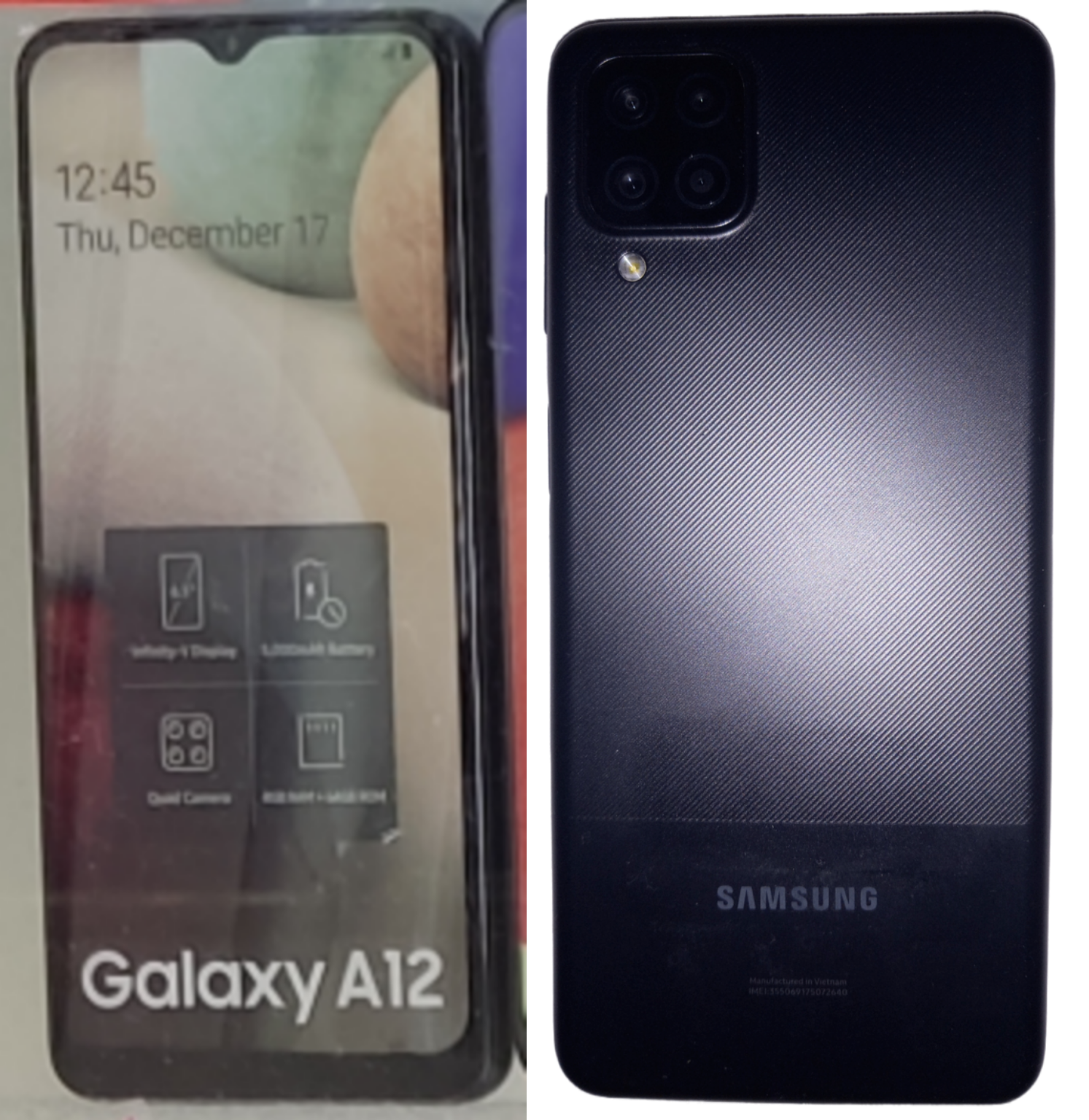
- Samsung Galaxy A12 in Black
- Brand: Samsung
- Manufacturer: Samsung Electronics
- Type: Smartphone
- Series: Galaxy A series Galaxy M series Galaxy F series
- First released: A12: November 24, 2020; 5 years ago; M12: February 5, 2021; 5 years ago (India); April 19, 2021; 5 years ago (Europe); F12: April 5, 2021; 5 years ago
- Availability by region: A12: December 21, 2020 (Global); February 16, 2021 (India, original); April, 2021 (U.S.); M12: March 18, 2021 (India); April 30, 2021 (Europe); F12: April 12, 2021; A12 Nacho: August 9, 2021 (Original); August 12, 2021 (Rebranded as A12)
- Predecessor: Samsung Galaxy A11; Samsung Galaxy M11
- Successor: Samsung Galaxy A13; Samsung Galaxy M13; Samsung Galaxy F13
- Related: Samsung Galaxy A02/A02s; Samsung Galaxy A22; Samsung Galaxy A32; Samsung Galaxy A42 5G; Samsung Galaxy A52; Samsung Galaxy A72; Samsung Galaxy M22; Samsung Galaxy M32; Samsung Galaxy M52 5G; Samsung Galaxy F52 5G; Samsung Galaxy F62/M62
- Compatible networks: GSM, HSPA, LTE
- Form factor: Glass front, plastic back, plastic frame
- Colors: A12: Black, White, Blue and Red; M12, F12: Black, Blue and Green
- Dimensions: A12: 164 mm (6.5 in) H 75.8 mm (2.98 in) W 8.9 mm (0.35 in) D; M12, F12: 164 mm (6.5 in) H 75.9 mm (2.99 in) W 9.7 mm (0.38 in) D
- Weight: A12: 205 g (7.2 oz); M12 (India), F12: 221 g (7.8 oz); M12 (Europe): 212 g (7.5 oz)
- Operating system: Original (A12): Android 10 with One UI Core 2.5; Original (M12, F12, A12 Nacho): Android 11 with One UI Core 3.1; Current (A12): Android 12 with One UI Core 4.1; Current (M12, F12, A12 Nacho): Android 13 with One UI Core 5.1
- System-on-chip: A12: Mediatek MT6765 Helio P35 (12nm); M12, F12, A12 Nacho: Samsung Exynos 850 (S5E3830) (8nm)
- CPU: A12: Octa-core 4x 2.35 GHz Cortex-A53 + 4x 1.8 GHz Cortex-A53; M12, F12, A12 Nacho: Octa-core 8x 2.0 GHz Cortex-A55
- GPU: A12: PowerVR GE8320; M12, F12, A12 Nacho: ARM Mali-G52
- Memory: 3 GB, 4 GB, or 6 GB
- Storage: 32 GB, 64 GB or 128 GB (eMMC 5.1)
- Removable storage: MicroSD (up to 1 TB)
- SIM: Dual-slot nanoSIM
- Battery: A12, M12 (Europe): 5000 mAh lithium polymer; M12 (India), F12: 6000 mAh lithium polymer
- Charging: 15W fast charging via USB Type-C
- Rear camera: Quad-Camera Setup; A12: Primary: Samsung ISOCELL S5KGM2 (Global) / Samsung ISOCELL S5K2P6 (U.S.); 16 MP (U.S.) / 48 MP (Global), f/2.0, 25mm (wide), FoV 82°, 1/3.06" (U.S.) / 1/2.0" (Global), 1.0 µm (U.S.) / 0.8 µm (Global), AF; Ultrawide: GalaxyCore GC5035; 5 MP, f/2.2, 14mm, FoV 115°, 1/5.0", 1.12 µm, FF; Macro: GalaxyCore GC02M1; 2 MP, f/2.4, 1/5.0", 1.75 µm, FF; Depth: GalaxyCore GC02M1B; 2 MP, f/2.4, 1/5.0", 1.75 µm; A12 Nacho / M12 / F12: Primary: Samsung ISOCELL S5KGM2; 48 MP, f/2.0, 25mm (wide), FoV 82°, 1/2.0", 0.8 µm, AF (A12 Nacho), PDAF (M12 / F12); Ultrawide: GalaxyCore GC5035; 5 MP, f/2.2, 14mm, FoV 115°, 1/5.0", 1.12 µm, FF; Macro: GalaxyCore GC02M1; 2 MP, f/2.4, 1/5.0", 1.75 µm, FF; Depth: GalaxyCore GC02M1B; 2 MP, f/2.4, 1/5.0", 1.75 µm; Camera features: LED flash, Panorama, HDR; Video recording: 1080p@30fps
- Front camera: Samsung ISOCELL S5K4HAYX or Siliconfile SR846D; 8 MP, f/2.2, 25mm (wide), FoV 81.1°, 1/4.0", 1.12 µm, FF; Camera features: HDR; Video recording: 1080p@30fps
- Display: A12: 60Hz refresh rate, IPS LCD 720 × 1600, 6.5 in (170 mm), 20:9 ratio, ~85.8% screen-to-body ratio, ~270 ppi density; M12, F12: 90Hz refresh rate, IPS LCD 720 × 1600, 6.5 in (170 mm), 20:9 ratio, ~81.9% screen-to-body ratio, ~270 ppi density, Gorilla Glass protection (Galaxy F12 only)
- Sound: Loudspeaker, 3.5mm audio jack
- Connectivity: 3.5 mm aux, Bluetooth 5.0, Wi-Fi 802.11 b/g/n 2.4GHz, FM radio
- Data inputs: Fingerprint scanner (side-mounted); Accelerometer; Proximity sensor
- Model: A12: SM-A125F/DSN, SM-A125F/DS, SM-A125F, SM-A125U, SM-A125U1, SM-A125M/DSN, SM-A125M/DS, SM-A125W, SM-A127N; A12 Nacho: SM-A127F/DS, SM-A127F/DSN, SM-A127F, SM-A127M, SM-A127U; M12: SM-M127F/DS, SM-M127F/DSN, SM-M127F, SM-M127G/DS, SM-M127G/DSN, SM-M127G; F12: SM-F127G, SM-F127G/DS, SM-F127F, SM-F127F/DS
- SAR: 0.67 W/kg (head); 1.38 W/kg (body); (Galaxy A12)
- Other: NFC (market/region dependent)
- Website: web.archive.org/web/20210501061133/https://www.samsung.com/us/mobile/phones/galaxy-a/galaxy-a12-unlocked-sm-a125uzkdxaa/

The Samsung Galaxy A12 is an entry-level 64-bit Android-based smartphone manufactured by Samsung Electronics. It was announced on November 24, 2020 as a successor to the Samsung Galaxy A11. There were several rebranded versions of the device: the Galaxy M12 (announced on February 5, 2021), the Galaxy F12 (announced on April 5, 2021), and the Galaxy A12 Nacho (announced on August 9, 2021).

== Specifications ==
=== Design ===
The Samsung Galaxy A12 features a plastic back covered with a diagonal stripe texture, except for the bottom quarter, which is flat and joined with a metallic Samsung logo. Additionally, the Samsung Galaxy M12 features a plastic back which is covered with a vertical stripe texture (with small horizontal stripes) and a black Samsung logo at the bottom. The fingerprint sensor is integrated into the power button on the right.

| Galaxy A12 Galaxy A12 Nacho | Galaxy M12 | Galaxy F12 |
|---|---|---|
| Red; Blue; White; Black | Green; Light Blue; Black | |

=== Hardware ===
==== Display ====
All variants have a 6.5 in (170 mm) IPS LCD Infinity-V display with HD+ (720×1600) resolution. The only difference is the 90 hz refresh rate found on the Galaxy M12 and Galaxy F12.

==== Cameras ====
All variants feature quad rear-facing cameras housed in a black rounded square with a separate LED flash. The camera system comprises a 48 MP primary camera, an 8 MP ultrawide camera, and two 2 MP sensors for macro and depth. The North American version of the A12 uses a 16 MP main camera sensor instead of 48 MP found in the original.

The front-facing camera has an 8 MP resolution. Video can be recorded at up to 1080p at 30 fps on the main, ultrawide and selfie cameras.

==== Processor and memory ====
The original variant of the Galaxy A12 is powered by the MediaTek Helio P35 SoC, while all of its rebranded versions and the Galaxy A12 Nacho uses the Samsung Exynos 850 SoC.

All variants have a dedicated slot for microSDXC and internal storage configurations ranging from 32 GB to 128 GB as well as memory configurations ranging from 3GB to 6GB. All variants also use eMMC for its internal storage.

==== Battery ====
The Galaxy A12, Galaxy A12 Nacho, and international Galaxy M12 feature a 5000mAh non-removable battery with 15W fast charging support. The Indian variants of the Galaxy M12 and F12 offer a larger 6000mAh battery capacity while maintaining the same 15W charging speed.

=== Software ===
The Samsung Galaxy A12 were pre-installed with Android 10 and One UI Core 2.5, while the Galaxy M12, Galaxy F12 and Galaxy A12 Nacho were pre-installed with One UI Core 3.1 and Android 11. Like its predecessors, they were eligible to have two OS updates and 4 years of security updates.

| | Pre-installed OS | OS Upgrades history | | End of support |
| | Pre-installed OS | 1st | 2nd | End of support |
|---|---|---|---|---|
| A12 LTE | Android 10 (One UI Core 2.5) | Android 11 (One UI Core 3.1); May 2021 | Android 12 (One UI Core 4.1); August 2022 | January 2025 |
| A12 Nacho | Android 11 (One UI Core 3.1) | Android 12 (One UI Core 4.1); May 2022 | Android 13 (One UI Core 5.0); December 2022 (One UI Core 5.1); April 2023 | January 2025 |
| M12 | Android 11 (One UI Core 3.1) | Android 12 (One UI Core 4.1); July 2022 | Android 13 (One UI Core 5.0); December 2022 (One UI Core 5.1); June 2023 | January 2025 |
| F12 | Android 11 (One UI Core 3.1) | Android 12 (One UI Core 4.1); August 2022 | Android 13 (One UI Core 5.0); January 2023 (One UI Core 5.1); April 2023 | January 2025 |

| Preceded by Samsung Galaxy A11 | Samsung Galaxy A12; 2021 | Succeeded by Samsung Galaxy A13 |
| Preceded by Samsung Galaxy M11 | Samsung Galaxy M12; 2021 | Succeeded by Samsung Galaxy M13 |
| Preceded by N/A | Samsung Galaxy F12; 2021 | Succeeded by Samsung Galaxy F13 |
