= Samsung Galaxy F13 =

2022 Android smartphone by Samsung

- Brand: Samsung Galaxy
- Manufacturer: Samsung Electronics
- Type: Smartphone
- Series: Samsung Galaxy F series
- First released: June 22, 2022; 4 years ago
- Predecessor: Samsung Galaxy F12
- Successor: Samsung Galaxy F14; Samsung Galaxy F14 5G
- Related: Samsung Galaxy M13; Samsung Galaxy F23 5G
- Compatible networks: GSM / HSPA / LTE
- Form factor: Slate
- Colors: Deep Green, Orange Copper, Light Blue
- Dimensions: 165.4 mm (6.51 in) H 76.9 mm (3.03 in) W 9.3 mm (0.37 in) D
- Weight: 207 g (7.3 oz)
- Operating system: Original: Android 12 with One UI Core 4.1; Last: Android 14 with One UI Core 6.1
- System-on-chip: Exynos 850 (8nm)
- CPU: Octa-core (4x2.0 GHz Cortex-A55 & 4x2.0 GHz Cortex-A55)
- GPU: Mali-G52
- Memory: 4 GB RAM
- Storage: 64 GB, 128 GB eMMC 5.1
- SIM: Dual SIM (Nano-SIM, dual stand-by)
- Battery: 6000 mAh
- Charging: Fast charging 15W
- Rear camera: 50 MP, f/1.8, (wide), PDAF; 5 MP, f/2.2, 123˚ (ultrawide); 2 MP, f/2.4, (depth); LED flash, panorama, HDR; 1080p@30fps
- Front camera: 8 MP, f/2.2, (wide); 1080p@30fps
- Display: 6.6 in (170 mm), Infinity-V Display; 720 x 1600 pixels, 20:9 ratio (~266 ppi density); PLS LCD
- Sound: Loudspeaker; 3.5mm jack
- Connectivity: Wi-Fi 802.11 a/b/g/n/ac, dual-band, hotspot Bluetooth 5.0, A2DP, LE
- Data inputs: Multi-touch screen; USB Type-C 2.0
- Model: SM-E135F, SM-E135F/DS

The Samsung Galaxy F13 is a mid-range smartphone manufactured by Samsung Electronics. It is part of Samsung Galaxy F series. This phone was announced on 22 June 2022.

On 22 June 2022, Samsung launched Galaxy F13 in India with an Auto Data Switching feature.

The F13 marks the last time the Galaxy F1x series only has 4G LTE network support, as its successor also had a 5G version.
