= Samsung Galaxy M13 =

Android smartphone by Samsung

Samsung Galaxy M13 Samsung Galaxy M13 5G
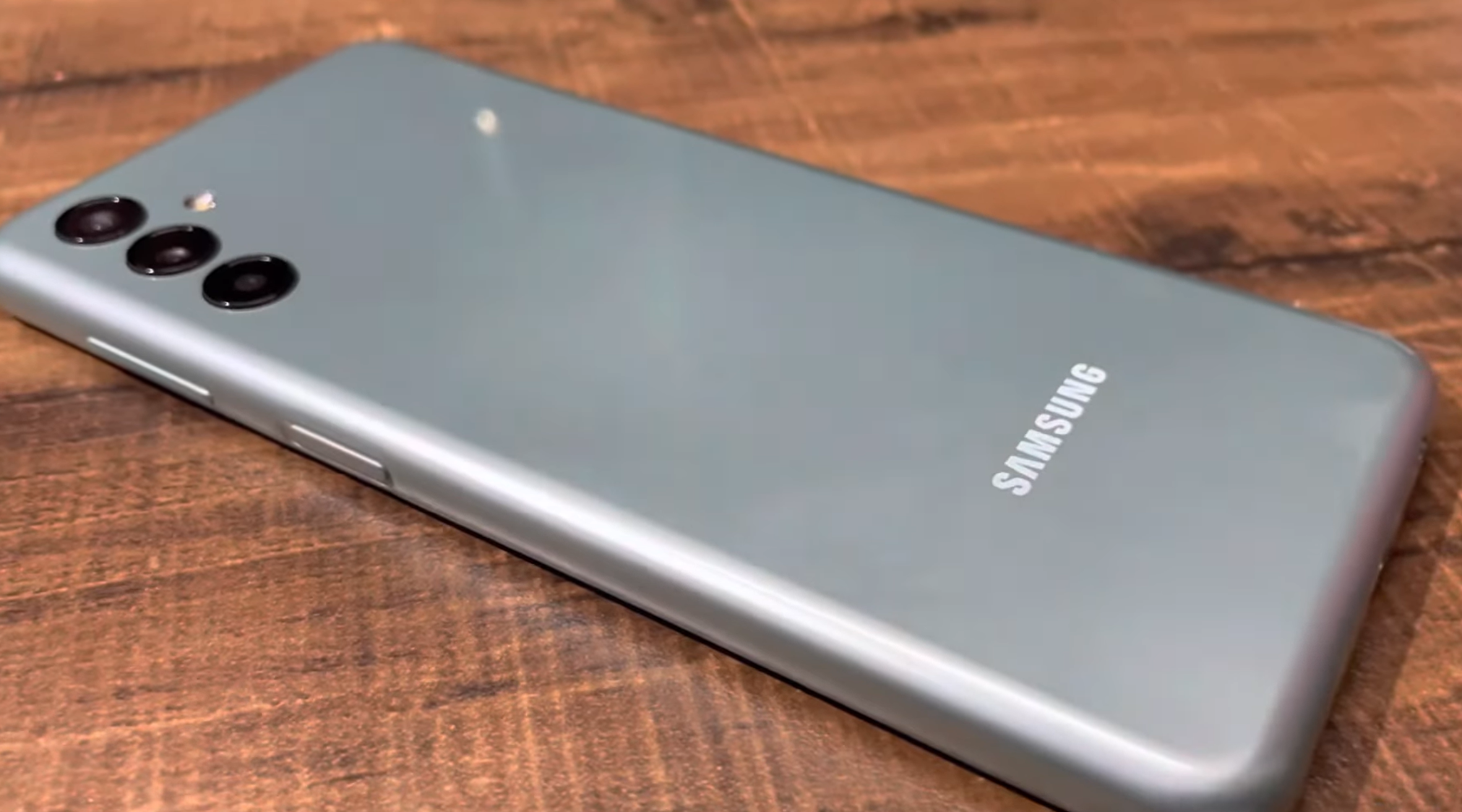
- The back of the Indian Samsung Galaxy M13
- Brand: Samsung Galaxy
- Manufacturer: Samsung Electronics
- Type: Smartphone
- Series: Samsung Galaxy M series
- First released: M13: May 27, 2022; 4 years ago M13 5G: July 23, 2022; 4 years ago
- Predecessor: Samsung Galaxy M12
- Successor: Samsung Galaxy M14; Samsung Galaxy M14 5G
- Related: Samsung Galaxy F13; Samsung Galaxy M23 5G; Samsung Galaxy M33 5G; Samsung Galaxy M53 5G
- Compatible networks: M13: GSM / HSPA / LTE; M13 5G: GSM / HSPA / LTE / 5G NR
- Form factor: Slate
- Dimensions: M13: 165.4 mm (6.51 in) H 76.9 mm (3.03 in) W 8.4 mm (0.33 in) D; M13 5G: 164.5 mm (6.48 in) H 76.5 mm (3.01 in) W 8.8 mm (0.35 in) D
- Weight: M13: 192 g (6.8 oz); M13 5G: 195 g (6.9 oz)
- Operating system: Android 12 with One UI 4.1
- System-on-chip: M13: Samsung Exynos 850 (8nm); M13 5G: MediaTek MT6833 Dimensity 700 (7 nm)
- CPU: M13: Octa-core (4x2.0 GHz Cortex-A55 & 4x2.0 GHz Cortex-A55); M13 5G: Octa-core (2x2.2 GHz Cortex-A76 & 6x2.0 GHz Cortex-A55)
- GPU: M13: Mali-G52; M13 5G: Mali-G57
- Memory: 4 GB RAM
- Storage: 64 GB, 128 GB eMMC 5.1
- Removable storage: microSDXC
- SIM: Dual SIM (Nano-SIM, dual stand-by)
- Battery: 6000 mAh
- Charging: Fast charging 15W
- Rear camera: M13: 50 MP, f/1.8, (wide), PDAF 5 MP, f/2.2, 123˚ (ultrawide) 2 MP, f/2.4, (depth); M13 5G: 50 MP, f/1.8, (wide), PDAF 2 MP, f/2.4, (depth); Both: LED flash, panorama, HDR 1080p@30fps
- Front camera: M13: 8 MP, f/2.2, (wide); M13 5G: 5 MP, f/2.0, (wide); Both: 1080p@30fps
- Display: M13: 6.6 in (170 mm); M13 5G: 6.5 in (170 mm); All: Infinity-U Display 1080 × 2408 resolution, 20:9 aspect ratio (~266 ppi density) PLS LCD
- Sound: Loudspeaker; 3.5mm jack
- Connectivity: Wi-Fi 802.11 a/b/g/n/ac, dual-band, hotspot Bluetooth 5.0, A2DP, LE; A-GPS, GLONASS, GALILEO, BDS
- Data inputs: Multi-touch screen USB Type-C 2.0; Sensors: Fingerprint scanner (side-mounted); Accelerometer; Compass
- Water resistance: n/a

The Samsung Galaxy M13 is an Android-based smartphone manufactured by Samsung Electronics as a part of its Galaxy M series. This phone was announced on 27 May 2022.
