= One UI =

Android distribution by Samsung Electronics

- Screenshot of the One UI 9 home screen on a Galaxy Z Fold 8 Ultra
- Developer: Samsung Electronics
- Written in: C, C++, Rust, Kotlin
- OS family: Android (Linux)
- Working state: Current
- Source model: Closed-source
- Initial release: 7 November 2018; 8 years ago
- Latest release: 9.0 (based on Android 17) / 22 July 2026; 3 months ago
- Latest preview: 9.5 Beta 1 (based on Android 17) / 18 November 2026; 0 days ago
- Available in: 100+ languages
- List of languages: 80+ languages and regional variants worldwide; Azərbaycan – Azerbaijani; Bosanski – Bosnian; Català – Catalan; Čeština – Czech; Dansk – Danish; Deutsch (Deutschland) – German (Germany); Deutsch (Österreich) – German (Austria); Deutsch (Schweiz) – German (Switzerland); Èdè Yorùbá (Bɛ̀nɛ̀) – Yoruba (Benin); Èdè Yorùbá (Nàìjíríà) – Yoruba (Nigeria); Eesti – Estonian; English (Australia) – English (Australia); English (Canada) – English (Canada); English (India) – English (India); English (Ireland) – English (Ireland); English (New Zealand) – English (New Zealand); English (Philippines) – English (Philippines); English (South Africa) – English (South Africa); English (United Kingdom) – English (United Kingdom); English (United States) – English (United States); English (Zawgyi) – English (Zawgyi); Español (España) – Spanish (Spain); Español (Estados Unidos) – Spanish (United States); Euskara – Basque; Filipino – Filipino; Français (Belgique) – French (Belgium); Français (Canada) – French (Canada); Français (France) – French (France); Français (Suisse) – French (Switzerland); Gaeilge – Irish; Galego – Galician; Hausa (Gana) – Hausa (Ghana); Hausa (Nijar) – Hausa (Niger); Hausa (Nijeriya) – Hausa (Nigeria); Hrvatski – Croatian; Igbo – Igbo; Indonesia – Indonesian; Íslenska – Icelandic; Italiano – Italian; Kiswahili (Jamhuri ya Kidemokrasia ya Kongo) – Swahili (Congo - Kinshasa); Kiswahili (Kenya) – Swahili (Kenya); Kiswahili (Tanzania) – Swahili (Tanzania); Kiswahili (Uganda) – Swahili (Uganda); Latviešu – Latvian; Lietuvių – Lithuanian; Magyar – Hungarian; Malaysia – Malay; Nederlands (België) – Dutch (Belgium); Nederlands (Nederland) – Dutch (Netherlands); Norsk bokmål – Norwegian Bokmål; O‘zbek – Uzbek (Latin); Polski (Polska) – Polish (Poland); Polski (Silesian) – Polish (Silesian); Português (Brasil) – Portuguese (Brazil); Português (Portugal) – Portuguese (Portugal); Română – Romanian; Shqip – Albanian; Slovenčina – Slovak; Slovenščina – Slovenian; Srpski – Serbian (Latin); Suomi – Finnish; Svenska – Swedish; Tiếng Việt – Vietnamese; Türkçe – Turkish; Türkmen dili – Turkmen; Ελληνικά – Greek; Беларуская – Belarusian; Български – Bulgarian; Кыргызча – Kyrgyz; Қазақ тілі – Kazakh; Македонски – Macedonian; Монгол – Mongolian; Русский – Russian; Српски – Serbian (Cyrillic); Тоҷикӣ – Tajik; Українська – Ukrainian; ქართული – Georgian; Հայերեն – Armenian; עברית – Hebrew; اردو – Urdu; العربية (إسرائيل) – Arabic (Israel); العربية (الإمارات العربية المتحدة) – Arabic (United Arab Emirates); العربية (مصر) - Arabic (Egypt); فارسی – Persian; አማርኛ – Amharic; नेपाली – Nepali; मराठी – Marathi; हिन्दी – Hindi; অসমীয়া – Assamese; বাংলা (বাংলাদেশ) – Bangla (Bangladesh); বাংলা (ভারত) – Bangla (India); ਪੰਜਾਬੀ – Punjabi; ગુજરાતી – Gujarati; ଓଡ଼ିଆ – Odia; தமிழ் – Tamil; తెలుగు – Telugu; ಕನ್ನಡ – Kannada; മലയാളം – Malayalam; සිංහල – Sinhala; ไทย – Thai; ລາວ – Lao; မြန်မာ (Unicode) – Burmese (Unicode); မြန်မာ (Zawgyi) – Burmese (Zawgyi); ខ្មែរ – Khmer; 한국어 – Korean; 日本語 – Japanese; 简体中文 (中国) – Simplified Chinese (China); 繁體中文 (台灣) – Traditional Chinese (Taiwan); 繁體中文 (香港) – Traditional Chinese (Hong Kong); Note: Not all languages are available on all devices. Some languages are removed completely in some regions.
- Update method: Firmware over-the-air
- Package manager: Android package (.apk)
- Supported platforms: ARMv7, ARMv8, ARMv9
- Kernel type: Monolithic (modified Linux kernel)
- Userland: Bionic libc, shell from NetBSD, native core utilities
- Default user interface: Graphical
- Preceded by: Samsung Experience
- Official website: www.samsung.com/us/apps/one-ui/

Support status
- One UI 6 and later supported

One UI is a user interface developed by Samsung Electronics for its mobile, computing devices and TVs, including Android-based devices running Android 9 "Pie" and later. It is the successor to Samsung Experience.

Samsung designed One UI to make using larger smartphones easier and be more visually appealing. It was announced and unveiled at Samsung Developer Conference on 7 November 2018, and was updated in the Galaxy Unpacked event on 20 February 2019 alongside the Galaxy S10 series, the Galaxy Fold, the Galaxy Watch Active, the Galaxy Fit and the Galaxy Buds, since then receiving yearly upgrades.

== Overview ==
Overview of One UI versions
Version	Initial release date	Latest version	Latest release date	Android version
One UI 1	7 November 2018	1.5	12 August 2019	Android 9 "Pie"
One UI 2	7 November 2019	2.5	21 August 2020	Android 10
One UI 3	20 December 2020	3.1.1 (Note: Identifies as One UI 3.1 on slate-style phones.)	11 August 2021	Android 11
One UI 4	15 November 2021	4.1.1 (Note: Identifies as One UI 4.1 on slate-style phones.)	25 August 2022	Android 12 (Note: Android 12L when running One UI 4.1.1.)
One UI 5	12 October 2022	5.1.1 (Note: Identifies as One UI 5.1 on slate-style phones.)	26 July 2023	Android 13
One UI 6	26 October 2023	6.1.1 (Note: Identifies as One UI 6.1 on slate-style phones.)	10 July 2024	Android 14
One UI 7	22 January 2025	7.0	22 January 2025	Android 15
One UI 8	9 July 2025	8.5	25 February 2026	Android 16 (Note: Android 16 QPR2 when running One UI 8.5.)
One UI 9	22 July 2026	9.0	22 July 2026	Android 17
One UI 9	22 July 2026	9.5 beta 1	18 November 2026	Android 17
Legend: Unsupported Supported Latest version Preview version

Overview of One UI Watch versions
Version	Initial release date	OS version
One UI Watch 1.0	17 May 2019	Tizen 4.0.0.4
One UI Watch 1.2	23 July 2019	Tizen 4.0.0.5
One UI Watch 1.5	19 November 2019	Tizen 4.0.0.7
One UI Watch 2.0	6 August 2020	Tizen 5.5.0.1
One UI Watch 3.0	27 July 2021	Wear OS 3.0
One UI Watch 3.0	9 February 2022	Wear OS 3.1
One UI Watch 4.0	9 February 2022	Wear OS 3.2
One UI Watch 4.5	26 August 2022	Wear OS 3.5
One UI Watch 5.0	11 August 2023	Wear OS 4.0
One UI Watch 6.0	19 July 2024	Wear OS 5.0
One UI Watch 8.0	22 July 2025	Wear OS 6.0
One UI Watch 9.0	7 August 2026	Wear OS 7.0
Legend: Unsupported Supported Latest version Preview version

=== History ===
==== Development ====
Prior to the release of One UI, early builds of the then new software interface made its way to the public in September 2018, which was internally named as Samsung Experience 10. The said software reported to include several refinements from its predecessor, Samsung Experience, which included improvements to the user interface, such as placing common features and user interface elements along the middle of the screen rather than near the top. The software skin was also the first in Android to implement a system-wide Dark mode (then called as "Night mode") interface (which gives UI elements and supported applications a darkened color scheme).

==== Release ====
The first version of One UI (known as One UI 1.0) was announced and released on 7 November 2018 at the Samsung Developer Conference, which now features refined icons and improvements to one-hand usage, making a "natural experience" on larger screen sizes and makes them easier to reach with a user's thumb when using the device one-handed.

For similar reasons, apps use large headers to push their main content towards the vertical center of the screen. The navigation bar supports the use of gestures and the usual 3-button system. As with Android Pie upstream, the Overview screen of recent apps uses a horizontal layout, as opposed to the vertical layout of previous versions. Dark mode was later implemented to other manufacturers from Android 10 and on IOS 13.

Upon the release of the first version, reviews for the software were mixed, praising for the design and organization improvements, but with criticism on the new gesture-based navigation being "half-baked" by some, with users having to swipe up from the bottom of the device in the three locations of the "buttons" to navigate.

When One UI launched in late 2018, the default system font continued to be the Google-developed Roboto. As before, Samsung have pre-installed their own Samsung Sans typeface and the "fun" typefaces Choco Cooky, Cool Jazz and Rosemary as options. One UI also introduced an additional pre-installed font, Samsung One, a lighter typeface that was originally released in 2016 as an option from the Galaxy Store.

Although Samsung Experience was rebranded to One UI in late 2018, some apps like Settings or the Calendar still identify One UI 1.0–1.5 as Samsung Experience. This would be corrected with One UI 2 as the Samsung Experience name would later fade away with the release of Android 10 for those supported devices. Additionally, app versions were 10.x and with each generation of One UI, the version of apps was incremented by 1 for every One UI version.

==== Succeeding developments ====
Since then, numerous One UI versions were released, alongside several major changes. With the release of One UI 3.1 in 2021, Google Messages has been pre-installed for most devices globally, until it became the default messaging app on Galaxy devices sold only in the U.S. since July 2026. Also in 2021, Samsung and Google announced the wearable version of Tizen and Wear OS were being merged.

With the release of One UI 6.0 in 2023, Roboto was replaced as the default system font by a new typeface, One UI Sans. Roboto continues to be pre-installed as an option, now under its own name.

One UI 7.0 became the shortest-lived among all released versions and the only version to not have an incremental version (e.g. x.1), due to its delayed roll out. Alongside the release of One UI 7.0 in 2024, One UI became the default interface on its Tizen-based smart TVs, monitors, projectors, and home appliances.

=== One UI Core ===
One UI Core was a slimmed down version of the original One UI feature set aimed towards the lower-end/budget models of the A Series, M Series, the F Series, and some budget A Series Tablets that all came with the core version of One UI. Devices running One UI Core lacked features that the full version of One UI gets such as Screen recording, Knox Security, Samsung DeX, Link to Windows, Good Lock modules, and sometimes AR Emoji depending if the OS uses 32-bit or 64-bit. Since the release of One UI 6, the One UI Core name had been abandoned, and devices previously running One UI Core were instead given full One UI software with limited features with the update to One UI 6.0 based on Android 14.

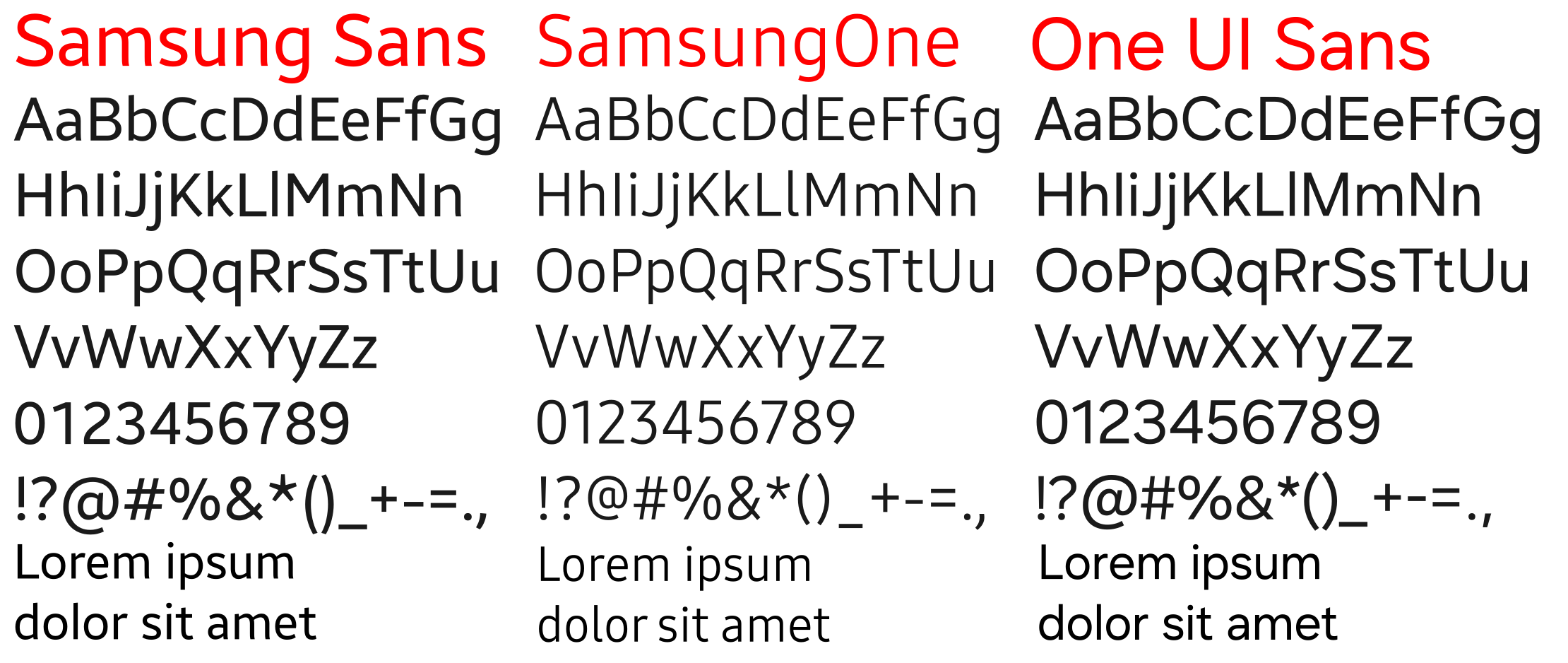
Comparison between Samsung Sans, SamsungOne and One UI Sans typefaces

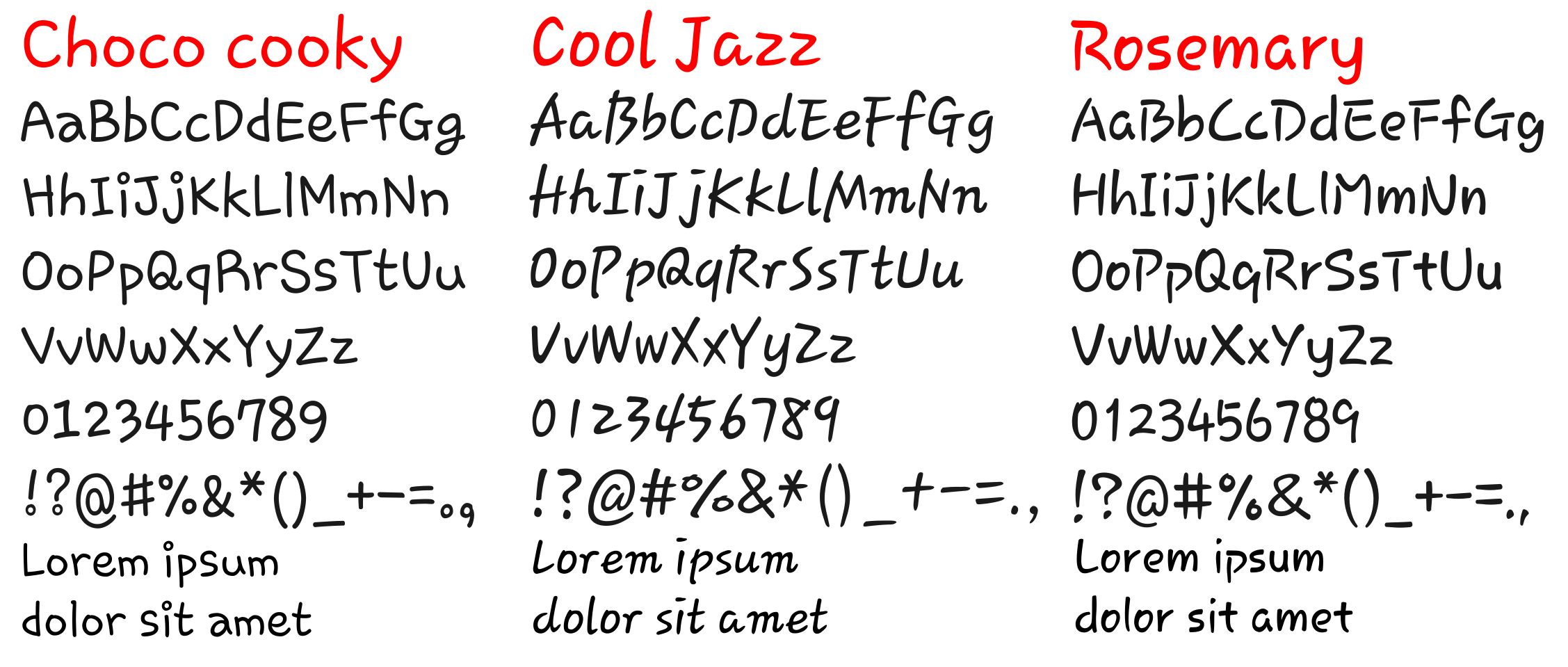
Comparison between Choco Cooky, Cool Jazz and Rosemary typefaces

== Default apps and components ==
The following is a list of Samsung's first-party apps and components included with One UI. Availability may vary by device and region, and not all apps and components are preinstalled or supported on every device. One UI devices (like other Android devices from different manufacturers) also come with numerous Google Mobile Services components preinstalled as part of the Android software experience, except for devices sold in Mainland China.

Software	Description
AR Doodle	Augmented reality camera for creating doodles
Bixby	Smart voice assistant
Bixby Vision	Augmented reality camera tools: Translate, Text copy, Discover, Wine (formerly)
Calculator	Basic calculator with scientific mode, tips calculator, and unit converters
Calendar	Calendar app
Camera	Photo and video camera (including integrated additions)
Clock	Clock, alarms, timers and countdowns app.
Contacts	Contacts manager
Creative Studio	AI-powered tool for creating images, stickers, wallpapers, and other graphics from photos or text prompts
Daily Board	Photo frame emulator for Galaxy tablets
Deco Pic	Decorating personal photos and videos
Device Care	Optimization tool for monitoring battery, storage, memory, and device security
Device Control & Media Output	Control home connected devices or switch media output to different devices (integrated in quick panel)
Digital Wellbeing	Screen time monitor tool
Email	Email client
Expert RAW	Image editor capable of editing raw image files
Galaxy Avatar	Augmented reality avatar and emoji creation tool, includes Avatar Camera, Stickers and Editor
Galaxy Enhance-X	AI-powered tool to automatically improve photos
Galaxy Store	Downloadable apps, games, themes and customizations
Galaxy Themes	Customization platform for downloading and applying themes, wallpapers, icons, and always-on display styles
Galaxy Wearable	Manager for Galaxy Watch, Galaxy Fit, Galaxy Buds, and Galaxy Ring wearable devices
Gallery	Photo and video gallery, includes stories and OneDrive backup
Gaming Hub	All installed games and Samsung instant plays
Good Guardians	Privileged utilities for Galaxy for device battery, temperature, and more
Good Lock	UI customization and productivity tools for Galaxy
Group Sharing	Share content with other Samsung accounts (integrated)
Health Platform	An aggregator bringing together data from various health apps
Interpreter	Real-time translation tool for face-to-face conversations using voice and text
Messages	SMS, MMS and RCS text messaging client (Note: No longer preinstalled on US devices sold in 2024 or later, following Samsung's transition to Google Messages. Discontinued in the US on July 6, 2026, while still remaining available in other regions.)
Modes and Routines	Conditional automation tool
Multi control	Service for controlling multiple Samsung devices and dragging-and-dropping files
Music Share	Multi-device connect to Bluetooth speakers
My Files	File manager including FTP/SFTP client and SMB network client and integration with OneDrive and Google Drive
PENUP	Social network for drawings, preinstalled on phones and tablets with S Pen
Phone	Cellular and VoIP calling client
Quick Measure	Augmented reality measuring tool
Quick Share	File transfer tool with nearby Galaxy or Android devices and other devices using link, QR code, or installing Windows App.
Radio	FM radio client (available on Samsung devices with 3.5mm headphone jack)
Reminder	Reminder app with support for syncing with Microsoft To Do
Samsung Blockchain Wallet	Cryptocurrency management
Samsung Browser	Chromium-based web browser
Samsung Cloud	Cloud storage and backup with support for end-to-end encryption
Samsung DeX	Desktop-like interface for using Galaxy devices on an external display
Samsung Find	Asset tracking service for tracing, finding, locking and wiping lost or stolen devices, including smart tags, as well as sharing location with people
Samsung Flow	Text, screen, and file share between phone, tablet, and PC
Samsung Food	Personalized recipe discovery, meal planning, and cooking assistant platform
Samsung Global Goals	Advertising to support donation for the UN's Sustainable Development Goals
Samsung Health	Personal health tracking tool
Samsung Health Monitor	Health monitoring app for ECG and blood pressure measurements on supported devices
Samsung Highlights	Curated content hub showcasing selected articles, media, and recommendations
Samsung Kids	Restricted environment for kids with parental controls
Samsung Members	Community support and exclusive content, including device diagnostics
Samsung Music	Music player of formats including MP3, WMA, AAC and FLAC, with support for Spotify integration (Note: Spotify available in 184 markets.)
Samsung News	News aggregator from various sources depending by region (provided by Upday in parts of Europe). Can be integrated (media page) into the One UI home screen. Replaced Samsung Free/Samsung O's Read tab. (Note: Samsung Free, also called Samsung O in some territories, was a media and entertainment app integrating Samsung TV Plus, Podcasts (region dependent), Samsung News news aggregator and instant casual games, from 2020-2023 or 2020-2025 depending on territory.)
Samsung Notes	Note-taking, sketching and PDF reader and editor
Samsung Shop	Storefront for Samsung Electronics products
Samsung TTS (Text-to-speech)	Speech synthesis
Samsung TV Plus	Free ad-supported television streaming service (available in selected markets)
Samsung Visit In	Provides location-based notifications for nearby Samsung store offers
Samsung Wallet	Digital wallet (Samsung Pay payment system, Samsung Pass password manager) (available in 32 markets)
Smart Switch	Data transfer tool to move content to a new Galaxy device from any phone including iPhones, also serves as service for Smart Switch PC and backup for Galaxy Watches
SmartThings	Smart home management platform
Secure Folder	Private and encrypted sandboxed workspace using Knox
Secure Wi-Fi	VPN network service, available in select countries and regions
Smart View	Screen mirroring and casting using Miracast (integrated in quick panel) (formerly Samsung Link and AllShare Play)
Studio	Create a project using pictures and/or videos
Tips	Device information, manual and remote support; not available on low-end models
Voice Recorder	Voice recording in M4A format (3gp4 codec) up to 256 kbit/s/48 kHz
Weather	Weather information provided by The Weather Channel

== Version history ==
Version	Android version	Release date	Key features/highlights	Ref.
1.0	9.0 Pie	24 December 2018	System-wide redesign for one-hand usability; Dark mode (which was then known as Night Mode); Always on display improvements; Custom gesture navigation implementation	
1.1	9.0 Pie	20 February 2019	Software improvements, stability fixes (primarily for the camera and biometrics)	
1.5	9.0 Pie	12 August 2019	Native screen recorder; Power mode for high system performance; Link to Windows support	
2.0	Android 10	3 December 2019	Added Digital Wellbeing; Minor UI changes in Device Care and Quick Settings Panel; Android 10 gesture system implementation; native Android Auto; Trash folder in Files	
2.1	Android 10	11 February 2020	Native 120 Hz screen refresh rate support; Quick Share and Music Share; Live Captions support	
2.5	Android 10	5 August 2020	Feature additions/improvements to camera, DeX, and gestures; New charging sound used for the Galaxy S20 series and later	
3.0	Android 11	2 December 2020	UI improvements to Quick settings/Notification panels, Notification pop-ups, and incoming call screens; Blue Light Filter renamed to Eye Comfort Shield	
3.1	Android 11	18 February 2021	Camera/Gallery improvements (enhanced touch autofocus and auto exposure control, improved Single Take feature, and software implementations such as Object Eraser, Multi Mic Recording); Pre-installed Google Messages	
3.1.1	Android 11	31 August 2021	Improvements to multi-tasking for Foldable devices; Note: The update also made its way to other Galaxy S and Note series devices, but lists the One UI version as 3.1 in the settings menu.	
4.0	Android 12	15 November 2021	Material You customization; Privacy Dashboard; Integration of Google Duo	
4.1	Android 12	15 March 2022	Virtual RAM feature (named as RAM Plus); UI improvements (redesigned palette picker, Smart Widgets); Camera improvements (Pro Mode on more cameras, Night Mode portraits); Accessibility related features: separate Left/Right audio balance, extra brightness toggle	
4.1.1	Android 12L	23 August 2022	Improvements to multi-tasking for Foldables and Tablets	
5.0	Android 13	28 October 2022	Option to completely turn off RAM Plus; UI improvements (lock screen, Material You)	
5.1	Android 13	13 February 2023	Improvements to multitasking; Settings and Spotify suggestions; Improvements to Camera and Gallery features (color tone for selfies, enhanced image remastering)	
5.1.1	Android 13	26 July 2023	Improvements to multitasking	
6.0	Android 14	30 October 2023	Google Messages as the default messaging app for Galaxy devices sold only in the U.S.; Redesigned Quick Settings panel, ability to sort notifications (in Notification panel) by time; One UI Sans being the new default font	
6.1	Android 14	28 March 2024	AI-based features branded as Galaxy AI, exclusive for the flagship Galaxy S and Z series only; AI models are powered by Baidu's Ernie model (for Mainland China only) and by Google's Gemini Pro (for the rest of the world); Enhanced battery protection designed to prevent battery degradation; Super HDR for photos in the Gallery and on social media apps like Instagram and Snapchat; Lock screen wallpaper support on Always On Display for compatible devices; Merger of Samsung's Quick Share and Google's Nearby Share feature with support for all Android and Windows devices; Seamless Updates support (which installs updates to a secondary system partition that the device boots from whenever it is restarted); made available starting with the Galaxy A55	
6.1.1	Android 14	5 September 2024	Galaxy AI related features: Portrait Studio, Suggested Replies and Sketch to Image; Non-Galaxy AI features: Improvements to multitasking	
7.0	Android 15	22 January 2025	Galaxy AI related features: All devices, including Galaxy A/M/F series: Circle To Search, Now Bar, AI Select; All devices (except Galaxy M and F series): Long press side button to activate Google Gemini; Galaxy S and Z series only: Live Translate, Interpreter, Note Assist, and Transcript Assist, alongside new tools such as Now Brief and an improved Generative Edit; Option to use local, on-device AI processing; Non-Galaxy AI features: UI overhaul (icons, widgets, system apps, lock screen, quick panel (which has been split into the notification panel and the control panel); Updated set of ringtones and notification sounds; Discontinuation of DeX for PC and downloadable Edge Panels	
8.0	Android 16	15 September 2025	Galaxy AI related features: Galaxy A/M/F series: Circle To Search on more devices; All devices: inclusion of Gemini Live; improved Portrait Studio in Generative Edit and Audio Eraser; Non-Galaxy AI features: Multitasking improvements; Improvements to Flex Window; Removed ability to unlock bootloader	
8.5	Android 16	25 February 2026	Galaxy AI related features: Integration; Improved Call assistance with AI screening; Creative Studio for wallpapers, stickers, and profile images; Perplexity AI integration in Bixby; Non-Galaxy AI features: Refreshed visual design, featuring transparent blur effects, floating elements, and smoother animations; built-in document scanner (in Camera app); extensive UI customizations (home screen, lock screen, and quick settings panel); Quick Share with support for AirDrop	
9.0	Android 17	22 July 2026	Galaxy AI related features: My FanCam, which keeps a selected person centered in a recorded video; editable and generative cards in Now Brief; Non-Galaxy AI features: more size options for the brightness, volume and media controls in the Quick Panel; Text Spotlight, an accessibility tool that shows selected text larger in a floating window; Mandatory device reset after the 13th failed unlock attempt (only applies to devices that were pre-installed with One UI 9)	
9.5	Android 17	18 November 2026 (Beta)	[icon]	

== Software support ==
Prior to the release of One UI, Samsung provided 2 years of OS upgrades and 3 or 4 years of security updates for most of its devices. Since then, software support has been extended multiple times:

- On 5 August 2020 (during the Galaxy Unpacked event unveiling the Galaxy Note20 series), Samsung announced that it would offer up to 3 years of OS (and One UI) upgrades and 4 years of security updates for select devices released between 2019 and 2023
- On 9 February 2022 (also during the Galaxy Unpacked event unveiling the Galaxy S22 series), Samsung announced that it would offer up to 4 years of OS (and One UI) upgrades and 5 years of security updates for select phones and most tablets released between 2021 and 2024, rugged tablets released since 2024, and smartwatches released between 2021 and 2025
- On 17 January 2024 (during the Galaxy Unpacked Event unveiling the Galaxy S24 series), Samsung announced that it would offer up to 7 years of both OS upgrades and security updates for select devices released since 2024, becoming the second manufacturer to offer 7 years of support (the first brand to do so was Google with the release of the Pixel 8 lineup).

Enterprise edition devices have a slightly longer software support. An example would be the Enterprise edition of the Galaxy S25 series, which, for the first time on any Android device, have support for 8 OS upgrades and 8 years of security updates.

The extended software support was followed by Samsung's low-end and mid-range phones released since 2025 and smartwatches sold since 2026:

- It expanded with 6 years of OS and security updates with the release of Galaxy A16, Galaxy A26, A36, A56, and the Galaxy A07 (including their respective Galaxy M and F series counterparts).
- Additionally, they provided 4 years of OS and security updates only for the following devices: the Galaxy A06 5G, and its rebranded versions, Galaxy F06 5G (sold in India), Galaxy M06 5G (sold online in select countries), and the Galaxy A25 (Japan variant).
- It currently provides 5 years of OS and security updates for the Galaxy Watch 9 series and later smartwatches as well.

Galaxy Book devices are subject to the Windows support life cycle. Samsung has no control on restricting Windows feature updates and Microsoft does not restrict feature updates on computers.

Samsung devices eligible for extended support
Device series		3 OS upgrades 4 years of security updates	4 (Note: 5 OS upgrades for Galaxy Watch 9 (and Galaxy Watch Ultra2) and succeeding models) OS upgrades 5 (Note: 4 years of security updates for the A06 5G/M06 5G/F06 5G) years of security updates	6 OS upgrades 6 years of security updates	7 OS upgrades 7 years of security updates	8 OS upgrades 8 years of security updates
Smartphones	Galaxy S	S10 and S20 series (except for the 2022 variant of S20 FE)	S21, S22, S23 series	—N/a	S24 series and later models	Enterprise edition of the Galaxy S25 series
Smartphones	Galaxy Note	Note 10 and Note 20 series	—N/a	—N/a	—N/a	—N/a
Smartphones	Galaxy Z	Fold, Z Fold 2, Z Flip/Flip 5G	Z Flip/Fold 3 to Z Flip/Fold 5	—N/a	Z Flip/Fold 6 and later models	—N/a
Smartphones	Galaxy A	A51/A51 5G (UW), A52/A52s; A71/A71 5G (UW), A72; A82; A90 5G	A06 5G; A15 (LTE/5G); A24, A25; A33, A34, A35; A53, A54, A55; A73	A07 (LTE/5G); A16 (LTE/5G); A26; A36; A56 and later models	—N/a	—N/a
Smartphones	Galaxy M	—N/a	M06 5G; M15; M33, M34, M35; M53, M54, M55	M07; M16 (LTE/5G); M36; M56 and later models	—N/a	—N/a
Smartphones	Galaxy F	—N/a	F06 5G; F15; F34, F35; F54, F55	F07; F16; F56 and later models	—N/a	—N/a
Smartphones	Galaxy Xcover	XCover Pro, XCover 5	XCover 6 Pro, XCover 7	—N/a	XCover 7 Enterprise Edition; XCover 7 Pro and later models	—N/a
Tablets	Galaxy Tab S	Tab S6, Tab S7; Tab S6 Lite (2020)	Tab S6 Lite (2024); Tab S8, Tab S9	—N/a	Tab S10 series and later models	—N/a
Tablets	Galaxy Tab A	Tab A7 Lite, Tab A8, and Tab A9/Tab A9+	—N/a	—N/a	Tab A11 and later models	—N/a
Tablets	Galaxy Tab Active	Tab Active 3 and Tab Active 4 Pro	Tab Active 5 and later models	—N/a	—N/a	Enterprise edition of the Tab Active 5
Galaxy Watch		—N/a	4 OS upgrades: Galaxy Watch 4 to Watch 8 series 5 OS upgrades: Galaxy Watch 9 series and later models	—N/a	—N/a	—N/a

== Devices running One UI ==
Sources to verify this section
To verify the latest OS version of Samsung devices:
- doc.samsungmobile.com/[model number]/[country specific code]/doc.html
- Model numbers: can be found on the related Wikipedia pages and by using a search engine
- Country Specific Code (CSC): Code designated by Samsung to differentiate between regional firmwares
- Codes can also be found using a search engine or using this example

Example: Galaxy S25 Ultra International (Europe) variant: https://doc.samsungmobile.com/SM-S938B/EUX/doc.html

To verify if the device is still supported:

- Samsung Mobile Security: The site usually removes device names if it already reached its end of support, without notice
- Model names: can be found by using a search engine

Legend:	Unsupported	Security only	Supported	Upcoming

=== Smartphones ===
==== Current series ====
===== Galaxy S series (2017−) =====
Device	Original version	Current version	Status	Ref.
Galaxy S8 / S8+ / S8 Active	Samsung Experience 8.1	One UI 1.0	Unsupported	
Galaxy S9 / S9+	Samsung Experience 9.0	One UI 2.5	Unsupported	
Galaxy S Light Luxury	Samsung Experience 9.0	One UI 2.5	Unsupported	
Galaxy S10e / S10 / S10+ / S10 5G	One UI 1.1	One UI 4.1	Unsupported	
Galaxy S10 Lite	One UI 2.0	One UI 5.1	Unsupported	
Galaxy S20 / S20+ / S20 Ultra	One UI 2.1	One UI 5.1	Unsupported	
Galaxy S20 FE	One UI 2.5	One UI 5.1	Unsupported	
Galaxy S20 FE (2022)	One UI 4.1	One UI 5.1	Unsupported	
Galaxy S21 / S21+ / S21 Ultra	One UI 3.1	One UI 7.0	Unsupported	
Galaxy S21 FE	One UI 4.0	One UI 8.0	Security	
Galaxy S22 / S22+ / S22 Ultra	One UI 4.1	One UI 8.0	Security	
Galaxy S23 / S23+ / S23 Ultra	One UI 5.1	One UI 9.0	Supported	
Galaxy S23 FE (Global)	One UI 5.1	One UI 9.0	Supported	
Galaxy S23 FE (Korea & Japan)	One UI 6.0	One UI 9.0	Supported	
Galaxy S24 / S24+ / S24 Ultra	One UI 6.1	One UI 9.0	Supported	
Galaxy S24 FE	One UI 6.1.1 (Note: Still displayed as One UI 6.1 in the settings menu.)	One UI 9.0	Supported	
Galaxy S25 / S25+ / S25 Ultra	One UI 7.0	One UI 9.0	Supported	
Galaxy S25 Edge	One UI 7.0	One UI 9.0	Supported	
Galaxy S25 FE	One UI 8.0	One UI 9.0	Supported	
Galaxy S26 / S26+ / S26 Ultra	One UI 8.5	One UI 9.0	Supported	
Galaxy S26 FE	One UI 9.0	One UI 9.0	Supported	

===== Galaxy Z series (2019−) & Samsung W series (2017−) =====
Device	Original version	Current version	Status	Ref.
W2018 (China)	Samsung Experience 8.5	One UI 1.0	Unsupported	
W2019 (China)	Samsung Experience 9.5	One UI 2.5	Unsupported	
Galaxy Z Fold / Z Fold 5G	One UI 1.1	One UI 4.1.1	Unsupported	
W20 5G (China)	One UI 1.5	One UI 4.1.1	Unsupported	
Galaxy Z Flip	One UI 2.1	One UI 5.1.1	Unsupported	
Galaxy Z Flip 5G	One UI 2.5	One UI 5.1.1	Unsupported	
Galaxy Z Fold 2 / W21 5G (China)	One UI 2.5	One UI 5.1.1	Unsupported	
Galaxy Z Fold 3 / W22 5G (China)	One UI 3.1.1	One UI 7.0	Unsupported	
Galaxy Z Flip 3	One UI 3.1.1	One UI 7.0	Unsupported	
Galaxy Z Fold 4 / W23 5G (China)	One UI 4.1.1	One UI 8.0	Security	
Galaxy Z Flip 4 / W23 Flip 5G (China)	One UI 4.1.1	One UI 8.0	Security	
Galaxy Z Fold 5 / W24 5G (China)	One UI 5.1.1	One UI 9.0	Supported	
Galaxy Z Flip 5 / W24 Flip 5G (China)	One UI 5.1.1	One UI 9.0	Supported	
Galaxy Z Fold 6	One UI 6.1.1	One UI 9.0	Supported	
Galaxy Z Flip 6 / W25 Flip 5G (China)	One UI 6.1.1	One UI 9.0	Supported	
Galaxy Z Fold SE / W25 5G (China)	One UI 6.1.1	One UI 9.0	Supported	
Galaxy Z Fold 7 / W26 5G (China)	One UI 8.0	One UI 9.0	Supported	
Galaxy Z Flip 7	One UI 8.0	One UI 9.0	Supported	
Galaxy Z Flip 7 FE	One UI 8.0	One UI 9.0	Supported	
Galaxy Z TriFold	One UI 8.0	One UI 9.0	Supported	
Galaxy Z Fold 8 / Z Fold 8 Ultra / W27 5G (China)	One UI 9.0	One UI 9.0	Supported	
Galaxy Z Flip 8	One UI 9.0	One UI 9.0	Supported	

===== Galaxy A series (2017−) =====
Generation	Device	Original version	Current version	Status	Ref.
Ax	Galaxy A8 / A8+ (2018)	Samsung Experience 8.5	One UI 1.0	Unsupported	
Ax	Galaxy A6 / A6+ (2018)	Samsung Experience 9.0	One UI 2.0	Unsupported	
Ax	Galaxy A7 (2018)	Samsung Experience 9.0	One UI 2.0	Unsupported	
Ax	Galaxy A8 Star (2018) / A9 Star	Samsung Experience 9.0	One UI 2.0	Unsupported	
Ax	Galaxy A9 (2018)	Samsung Experience 9.0	One UI 2.0	Unsupported	
Ax	Galaxy A8s (China) / A9 Pro (2019) (Korea)	Samsung Experience 9.5	One UI 2.0	Unsupported	
Ax0	Galaxy A10	One UI 1.1	One UI 3.1	Unsupported	
Ax0	Galaxy A10e / A20 (Japan)	One UI 1.1	One UI 3.1	Unsupported	
Ax0	Galaxy A10s	One UI Core 1.1	One UI Core 3.1	Unsupported	
Ax0	Galaxy A20 (Global) / Wide4 (Korea)	One UI 1.1	One UI 3.1	Unsupported	
Ax0	Galaxy A20e	One UI 1.1	One UI 3.1	Unsupported	
Ax0	Galaxy A20s	One UI Core 1.1	One UI Core 3.1	Unsupported	
Ax0	Galaxy A30	One UI 1.1	One UI 3.1	Unsupported	
Ax0	Galaxy A30s	One UI 1.5	One UI 3.1	Unsupported	
Ax0	Galaxy A40	One UI 1.1	One UI 3.1	Unsupported	
Ax0	Galaxy A40s	Samsung Experience 9.5	One UI 2.0	Unsupported	
Ax0	Galaxy A50	One UI 1.1	One UI 3.1	Unsupported	
Ax0	Galaxy A50s	One UI 1.5	One UI 3.1	Unsupported	
Ax0	Galaxy A60	One UI 1.1	One UI 3.1	Unsupported	
Ax0	Galaxy A70	One UI 1.1	One UI 3.1	Unsupported	
Ax0	Galaxy A70s	One UI 1.1	One UI 3.1	Unsupported	
Ax0	Galaxy A80	One UI 1.1	One UI 3.1	Unsupported	
Ax0	Galaxy A90 5G	One UI 1.5	One UI 4.1	Unsupported	
Ax1	Galaxy A01	One UI Core 2.0	One UI Core 4.1	Unsupported	
Ax1	Galaxy A11	One UI Core 2.0	One UI Core 4.1	Unsupported	
Ax1	Galaxy A21	One UI Core 2.1	One UI Core 4.1	Unsupported	
Ax1	Galaxy A21s	One UI Core 2.1	One UI Core 4.1	Unsupported	
Ax1	Galaxy A31	One UI 2.1	One UI 4.1	Unsupported	
Ax1	Galaxy A41	One UI 2.1	One UI 4.1	Unsupported	
Ax1	Galaxy A51	One UI 2.0	One UI 5.1	Unsupported	
Ax1	Galaxy A51 5G	One UI 2.1	One UI 5.1	Unsupported	
Ax1	Galaxy A71	One UI 2.0	One UI 5.1	Unsupported	
Ax1	Galaxy A71 5G / A Quantum (Korea)	One UI 2.1	One UI 5.1	Unsupported	
Ax2	Galaxy A02	One UI Core 2.5	One UI Core 3.1	Unsupported	
Ax2	Galaxy A02s	One UI Core 2.5	One UI Core 4.1	Unsupported	
Ax2	Galaxy A12	One UI Core 2.5	One UI Core 4.1	Unsupported	
Ax2	Galaxy A12 Nacho	One UI Core 3.1	One UI Core 5.1	Unsupported	
Ax2	Galaxy A22	One UI Core 3.1	One UI Core 5.1	Unsupported	
Ax2	Galaxy A22 5G / Buddy (Korea)	One UI Core 3.1	One UI Core 5.1	Unsupported	
Ax2	Galaxy A32	One UI 3.1	One UI 5.1	Unsupported	
Ax2	Galaxy A32 5G / Jump (Korea)	One UI 3.1	One UI 5.1	Unsupported	
Ax2	Galaxy A42 5G (Korea & US)	One UI 3.0	One UI 5.1	Unsupported	
Ax2	Galaxy A42 5G (Global)	One UI 2.5	One UI 4.1	Unsupported	
Ax2	Galaxy A52	One UI 3.1	One UI 6.1	Unsupported	
Ax2	Galaxy A52 5G	One UI 3.1	One UI 6.1	Unsupported	
Ax2	Galaxy A52s 5G	One UI 3.1	One UI 6.1	Unsupported	
Ax2	Galaxy A72	One UI 3.1	One UI 6.1	Unsupported	
Ax2	Galaxy A82 5G / Quantum2 (Korea)	One UI 3.1	One UI 6.1	Unsupported	
Ax3	Galaxy A03	One UI Core 3.1	One UI Core 5.1	Unsupported	
Ax3	Galaxy A03s	One UI Core 3.1	One UI Core 5.1	Unsupported	
Ax3	Galaxy A13 LTE and 5G (Global)	One UI Core 4.1	One UI 6.1	Unsupported	
Ax3	Galaxy A13 5G (Canada & US) / Wide6 (Korea)	One UI Core 3.1	One UI Core 5.1	Unsupported	
Ax3	Galaxy A23	One UI 4.1	One UI 6.1	Unsupported	
Ax3	Galaxy A23 5G (Global)	One UI 4.1	One UI 6.1	Unsupported	
Ax3	Galaxy A23 5G (Japan)	One UI Core 4.0	One UI 6.1	Unsupported	
Ax3	Galaxy A33 5G	One UI 4.1	One UI 8.0	Security	
Ax3	Galaxy A53 5G	One UI 4.1	One UI 8.0	Security	
Ax3	Galaxy A73 5G	One UI 4.1	One UI 8.0	Security	
Ax4	Galaxy A04	One UI Core 4.1	One UI 6.1	Security	
Ax4	Galaxy A04e	One UI Core 4.1	One UI 6.1	Security	
Ax4	Galaxy A04s	One UI Core 4.1	One UI 6.1	Unsupported	
Ax4	Galaxy A14	One UI Core 5.1	One UI 7.0	Security	
Ax4	Galaxy A14 5G	One UI Core 5.0	One UI 7.0	Security	
Ax4	Galaxy A24	One UI 5.1	One UI 9.0	Supported	
Ax4	Galaxy A34 5G	One UI 5.1	One UI 9.0	Supported	
Ax4	Galaxy A54 5G / Quantum4 (Korea)	One UI 5.1	One UI 9.0	Supported	
Ax5	Galaxy A05	One UI Core 5.1	One UI 7.0	Security	
Ax5	Galaxy A05s	One UI Core 5.1	One UI 7.0	Security	
Ax5	Galaxy A15	One UI 6.0	One UI 9.0	Supported	
Ax5	Galaxy A15 5G / Buddy3 (Korea)	One UI 6.0	One UI 9.0	Supported	
Ax5	Galaxy A25 5G (Global)	One UI 6.0	One UI 9.0	Supported	
Ax5	Galaxy A35 5G	One UI 6.1	One UI 9.0	Supported	
Ax5	Galaxy A55 5G / Quantum5 (Korea)	One UI 6.1	One UI 9.0	Supported	
Ax6	Galaxy A06	One UI 6.1	One UI 8.0	Security	
Ax6	Galaxy A06 5G / A25 5G (Japan)	One UI 7.0	One UI 9.0	Supported	
Ax6	Galaxy A16	One UI 6.1	One UI 9.0	Supported	
Ax6	Galaxy A16 5G / Buddy4 (Korea)	One UI 6.1	One UI 9.0	Supported	
Ax6	Galaxy A26 5G	One UI 7.0	One UI 9.0	Supported	
Ax6	Galaxy A36 5G	One UI 7.0	One UI 9.0	Supported	
Ax6	Galaxy A56 5G / Quantum6 (Korea)	One UI 7.0	One UI 9.0	Supported	
Ax7	Galaxy A07	One UI 7.0	One UI 9.0	Supported	
Ax7	Galaxy A07 5G	One UI 8.0	One UI 9.0	Supported	
Ax7	Galaxy A07s	One UI 8.5	One UI 9.0	Supported	
Ax7	Galaxy A17	One UI 7.0	One UI 9.0	Supported	
Ax7	Galaxy A17 5G / Buddy5 (Korea)	One UI 7.0	One UI 9.0	Supported	
Ax7	Galaxy A27 5G / Jump5 (Korea)	One UI 8.5	One UI 9.0	Supported	
Ax7	Galaxy A37 5G	One UI 8.5	One UI 9.0	Supported	
Ax7	Galaxy A57 5G / Quantum7 (Korea)	One UI 8.5	One UI 9.0	Supported	
Ax8	Galaxy A08	One UI 9.0	One UI 9.0	Supported	
Ax8	Galaxy A18	One UI 9.0	One UI 9.0	Supported	

===== Galaxy Xcover series (2017−) =====
Device	Original version	Current version	Status	Ref.
Galaxy Xcover 4	Samsung Experience 8.0	One UI 1.0	Unsupported	
Galaxy Xcover 4s	One UI 1.1	One UI 3.1	Unsupported	
Galaxy Xcover Pro	One UI 2.0	One UI 5.1	Unsupported	
Galaxy Xcover 5	One UI 3.1	One UI 6.1	Unsupported	
Galaxy Xcover 6 Pro	One UI 4.1	One UI 8.0	Security	
Galaxy Xcover 7	One UI 6.0	One UI 9.0	Supported	
Galaxy Xcover 7 Pro	One UI 7.0	One UI 9.0	Supported	

===== Galaxy M series (2019−) =====
Generation	Device	Original version	Current version	Status	Ref.
Mx0	Galaxy M10	Samsung Experience 9.5	One UI Core 2.0	Unsupported	
Mx0	Galaxy M10s	One UI Core 1.1	One UI Core 3.1	Unsupported	
Mx0	Galaxy M20	Samsung Experience 9.5	One UI Core 2.0	Unsupported	
Mx0	Galaxy M30	Samsung Experience 9.5	One UI Core 2.0	Unsupported	
Mx0	Galaxy M30s	One UI Core 1.1	One UI Core 3.1	Unsupported	
Mx0	Galaxy M40	One UI Core 1.1	One UI Core 3.1	Unsupported	
Mx1	Galaxy M01	One UI Core 2.0	One UI Core 4.1	Unsupported	
Mx1	Galaxy M01s	One UI Core 1.1	One UI Core 3.1	Unsupported	
Mx1	Galaxy M11	One UI Core 2.0	One UI Core 4.1	Unsupported	
Mx1	Galaxy M21	One UI Core 2.0	One UI Core 4.1	Unsupported	
Mx1	Galaxy M21s	One UI Core 2.0	One UI Core 4.1	Unsupported	
Mx1	Galaxy M21 Prime Edition 2021	One UI Core 3.1	One UI Core 5.1	Unsupported	
Mx1	Galaxy M31	One UI Core 2.0	One UI Core 4.1	Unsupported	
Mx1	Galaxy M31s	One UI Core 2.1	One UI Core 4.1	Unsupported	
Mx1	Galaxy M51	One UI Core 2.1	One UI Core 4.1	Unsupported	
Mx2	Galaxy M02	One UI Core 2.5	One UI Core 4.1	Unsupported	
Mx2	Galaxy M02s	One UI Core 2.5	One UI Core 4.1	Unsupported	
Mx2	Galaxy M12	One UI Core 3.1	One UI Core 5.1	Unsupported	
Mx2	Galaxy M22	One UI Core 3.1	One UI Core 5.1	Unsupported	
Mx2	Galaxy M32	One UI 3.1	One UI 5.1	Unsupported	
Mx2	Galaxy M32 5G	One UI 3.1	One UI 5.1	Unsupported	
Mx2	Galaxy M42 5G	One UI 3.1	One UI 5.1	Unsupported	
Mx2	Galaxy M52 5G	One UI 3.1	One UI 5.1	Unsupported	
Mx2	Galaxy M62	One UI 3.1	One UI 5.1	Unsupported	
Mx3	Galaxy M13	One UI Core 4.1	One UI 6.1	Unsupported	
Mx3	Galaxy M13 5G	One UI Core 4.1	One UI 6.1	Unsupported	
Mx3	Galaxy M23 5G / Buddy2 (Korea)	One UI 4.1	One UI 6.1	Unsupported	
Mx3	Galaxy M33 5G / Jump2 (Korea)	One UI 4.1	One UI 8.0	Security	
Mx3	Galaxy M53 5G / Quantum3 (Korea)	One UI 4.1	One UI 8.0	Security	
Mx4	Galaxy M04	One UI Core 4.1	One UI 6.1	Security	
Mx4	Galaxy M14	One UI Core 5.1	One UI 7.0	Security	
Mx4	Galaxy M14 5G	One UI Core 5.1	One UI 7.0	Security	
Mx4	Galaxy M34 5G	One UI 5.1	One UI 8.5	Supported	
Mx4	Galaxy M44 / Jump3 (Korea)	One UI 5.1	One UI 8.5	Supported	
Mx4	Galaxy M54 5G	One UI 5.1	One UI 9.0	Supported	
Mx5	Galaxy M05	One UI 6.0	One UI 8.0	Security	
Mx5	Galaxy M15 5G / Wide7 (Korea)	One UI 6.0	One UI 8.5	Supported	
Mx5	Galaxy M35 5G	One UI 6.1	One UI 8.5	Supported	
Mx5	Galaxy M55 5G / C55 5G (China)	One UI 6.1	One UI 8.5	Supported	
Mx5	Galaxy M55s 5G	One UI 6.1	One UI 8.5	Supported	
Mx6	Galaxy M06 5G	One UI 7.0	One UI 8.5	Supported	
Mx6	Galaxy M16 5G / Wide8 (Korea)	One UI 6.1	One UI 9.0	Supported	
Mx6	Galaxy M36 5G / Jump4 (Korea)	One UI 7.0	One UI 9.0	Supported	
Mx6	Galaxy M56 5G	One UI 7.0	One UI 9.0	Supported	
Mx7	Galaxy M07	One UI 7.0	One UI 9.0	Supported	
Mx7	Galaxy M17 5G / Wide9 (Korea)	One UI 7.0	One UI 9.0	Supported	
Mx7	Galaxy M17e 5G	One UI 8.0	One UI 9.0	Supported	
Mx7	Galaxy M47 5G	One UI 8.5	One UI 9.0	Supported	
Mx8	Galaxy M08	One UI 9.0	One UI 9.0	Supported	

===== Galaxy F series (2020−) =====
Generation	Device	Original version	Current version	Status	Ref.
Fx1	Galaxy F41	One UI Core 2.1	One UI Core 4.1	Unsupported	
Fx2	Galaxy F02s	One UI Core 2.1	One UI Core 4.1	Unsupported	
Fx2	Galaxy F12	One UI Core 3.1	One UI Core 5.1	Unsupported	
Fx2	Galaxy F22	One UI Core 3.1	One UI Core 5.1	Unsupported	
Fx2	Galaxy F42 5G / Wide5 (Korea)	One UI Core 3.1	One UI Core 5.1	Unsupported	
Fx2	Galaxy F52 5G	One UI 3.1	One UI 5.1	Unsupported	
Fx2	Galaxy F62	One UI 3.1	One UI 5.1	Unsupported	
Fx3	Galaxy F13	One UI Core 4.1	One UI 6.1	Unsupported	
Fx3	Galaxy F23 5G	One UI Core 4.1	One UI 6.1	Unsupported	
Fx4	Galaxy F04	One UI Core 4.1	One UI 6.1	Security	
Fx4	Galaxy F14	One UI Core 5.1	One UI 7.0	Security	
Fx4	Galaxy F14 5G	One UI Core 5.1	One UI 7.0	Security	
Fx4	Galaxy F34 5G	One UI 5.1	One UI 8.5	Supported	
Fx4	Galaxy F54 5G	One UI 5.1	One UI 8.5	Supported	
Fx5	Galaxy F05	One UI 6.0	One UI 8.0	Security	
Fx5	Galaxy F15 5G	One UI 6.0	One UI 8.5	Supported	
Fx5	Galaxy F55 5G	One UI 6.1	One UI 8.5	Supported	
Fx6	Galaxy F06 5G	One UI 7.0	One UI 8.5	Supported	
Fx6	Galaxy F16 5G	One UI 7.0	One UI 8.5	Supported	
Fx6	Galaxy F36 5G	One UI 7.0	One UI 8.5	Supported	
Fx6	Galaxy F56 5G	One UI 7.0	One UI 9.0	Supported	
Fx7	Galaxy F07	One UI 7.0	One UI 9.0	Supported	
Fx7	Galaxy F17 5G	One UI 7.0	One UI 9.0	Supported	
Fx7	Galaxy F70 5G	One UI 8.5	One UI 9.0	Supported	
Fx7	Galaxy F70e 5G	One UI 8.0	One UI 8.5	Supported	
Fx7	Galaxy F70 Pro 5G	One UI 8.5	One UI 9.0	Supported	
Fx8	Galaxy F08	One UI 9.0	One UI 9.0	Supported	

==== Former series ====
===== Galaxy Note series (2017−2020) =====
Device	Original version	Current version	Status	Ref.
Galaxy Note FE	Samsung Experience 8.1	One UI 1.0	Unsupported	
Galaxy Note 8	Samsung Experience 8.5	One UI 1.0	Unsupported	
Galaxy Note 9	Samsung Experience 9.5	One UI 2.5	Unsupported	
Galaxy Note 10 / Note 10+	One UI 1.5	One UI 4.1	Unsupported	
Galaxy Note 10 Lite	One UI 2.0	One UI 5.1	Unsupported	
Galaxy Note 20 / Note 20 Ultra	One UI 2.5	One UI 5.1	Unsupported	

===== Galaxy J series (2017−2018) =====
Device	Original version	Current version	Status	Ref.
Galaxy J3 (2017) / J3 Pro	Samsung Experience 8.1	One UI 1.1	Unsupported	
Galaxy J5 (2017) / J5 Pro	Samsung Experience 8.1	One UI 1.1	Unsupported	
Galaxy J7 (2017) / J7 Pro	Samsung Experience 8.1	One UI 1.1	Unsupported	
Galaxy J7 Core / J7 Neo / J7 Nxt	Samsung Experience 8.1	One UI 1.1	Unsupported	
Galaxy J7 Prime (2018) / J7 Prime 2	Samsung Experience 8.1	One UI 1.1	Unsupported	
Galaxy J7 Crown	Samsung Experience 9.0	One UI 1.1	Unsupported	
Galaxy J7 Duo	Samsung Experience 9.0	One UI 2.0	Unsupported	
Galaxy J7 (2018) US / Wide3	Samsung Experience 9.0	One UI 2.0	Unsupported	
Galaxy J4	Samsung Experience 9.0	One UI 2.0	Unsupported	
Galaxy J6 / On6	Samsung Experience 9.0	One UI 2.0	Unsupported	
Galaxy J8 / On8	Samsung Experience 9.0	One UI 2.0	Unsupported	
Galaxy J4+	Samsung Experience 9.5	One UI 2.0	Unsupported	
Galaxy J6+	Samsung Experience 9.5	One UI 2.0	Unsupported	

=== Tablets ===
==== Galaxy Tab S series (2017−) ====
Device	Original version	Current version	Status	Ref.
Galaxy Tab S3	Samsung Experience 8.0	One UI 1.1	Unsupported	
Galaxy Tab S4	Samsung Experience 9.5	One UI 2.5	Unsupported	
Galaxy Tab S5e	One UI 1.1	One UI 3.1	Unsupported	
Galaxy Tab S6	One UI 1.5	One UI 4.1.1	Unsupported	
Galaxy Tab S6 Lite	One UI 2.1	One UI 5.1.1	Unsupported	
Galaxy Tab S6 Lite (2022)	One UI 4.1	One UI 6.1.1	Unsupported	
Galaxy Tab S6 Lite (2024)	One UI 6.1	One UI 8.5	Supported	
Galaxy Tab S7 / S7+	One UI 2.5	One UI 5.1.1	Unsupported	
Galaxy Tab S7 FE	One UI 3.1.1	One UI 6.1.1	Unsupported	
Galaxy Tab S8 / S8+ / S8 Ultra	One UI 4.1	One UI 8.0	Security	
Galaxy Tab S9 / S9+ / S9 Ultra	One UI 5.1.1	One UI 9.0	Supported	
Galaxy Tab S9 FE / FE+	One UI 5.1.1	One UI 9.0	Supported	
Galaxy Tab S10+ / S10 Ultra	One UI 6.1.1	One UI 9.0	Supported	
Galaxy Tab S10 FE / S10 FE+	One UI 7.0	One UI 9.0	Supported	
Galaxy Tab S10 Lite	One UI 7.0	One UI 9.0	Supported	
Galaxy Tab S11 / S11 Ultra	One UI 8.0	One UI 9.0	Supported	
Galaxy Tab S12+ / S12 Ultra	One UI 9.0	One UI 9.0	Supported	

==== Galaxy Tab A series (2017−) ====
Device	Original version	Current version	Status	Ref.
Galaxy Tab A 8.0 (2017)	Samsung Experience 8.5	One UI 1.0	Unsupported	
Galaxy Tab A 8.0 (2018)	Samsung Experience 9.5	One UI 2.5	Unsupported	
Galaxy Tab A 10.5 (2018)	Samsung Experience 9.5	One UI 2.5	Unsupported	
Galaxy Tab A 8.0 (2019)	One UI Core 1.1	One UI Core 3.1	Unsupported	
Galaxy Tab A 8.0 with S Pen (2019)	One UI 1.1	One UI 3.1	Unsupported	
Galaxy Tab A 10.1 (2019)	One UI 1.1	One UI 3.1	Unsupported	
Galaxy Tab A7	One UI Core 2.5	One UI Core 4.1	Unsupported	
Galaxy Tab A7 (2022)	One UI Core 4.1	One UI Core 4.1	Unsupported	
Galaxy Tab A7 Lite	One UI Core 3.1	One UI 6.1	Unsupported	
Galaxy Tab A8	One UI Core 3.1	One UI 6.1	Unsupported	
Galaxy Tab A9	One UI 5.1.1	One UI 8.0	Security	
Galaxy Tab A9+	One UI 5.1.1	One UI 8.0	Security	
Galaxy Tab A9+ (2025)	One UI 7.0	One UI 8.5	Supported	
Galaxy Tab A11	One UI 7.0	One UI 9.0	Supported	
Galaxy Tab A11+	One UI 8.0	One UI 9.0	Supported	

==== Galaxy Tab Active series (2017−) ====
Device	Original version	Current version	Status	Ref.
Galaxy Tab Active 2	Samsung Experience 8.5	One UI 1.1	Unsupported	
Galaxy Tab Active Pro	One UI 1.5	One UI 3.1	Unsupported	
Galaxy Tab Active 3	One UI 2.5	One UI 5.1.1	Unsupported	
Galaxy Tab Active 4 Pro	One UI 4.1	One UI 7.0	Security	
Galaxy Tab Active 5	One UI 6.0	One UI 8.5	Supported	
Galaxy Tab Active 5 Pro	One UI 7.0	One UI 8.5	Supported	

=== Computers ===
==== Galaxy Book series (2017−) ====
Device	Original version	Current version	Status
Galaxy Book	Windows 10 (1607)	One UI Book 4 (Windows 11 25H2)	Supported
Galaxy Book 2	Windows 10 (1803)	One UI Book 4 (Windows 11 25H2)	Supported
Galaxy Book Pro	Windows 10 (20H2)	One UI Book 4 (Windows 11 25H2)	Supported
Galaxy Book Pro 360	Windows 10 (20H2)	One UI Book 4 (Windows 11 25H2)	Supported
Galaxy Book Odyssey	Windows 10 (20H2)	One UI Book 4 (Windows 11 25H2)	Supported
Galaxy Book (2021)	Windows 10 (20H2)	One UI Book 4 (Windows 11 25H2)	Supported
Galaxy Book Go	Windows 10 (21H1)	One UI Book 4 (Windows 11 25H2)	Supported
Galaxy Book 2 (2022)	Windows 10 (21H2)	One UI Book 5 (Windows 11 25H2)	Supported
Galaxy Book 2 360	Windows 10 (21H2)	One UI Book 5 (Windows 11 25H2)	Supported
Galaxy Book 2 Pro	Windows 10 (21H2)	One UI Book 5 (Windows 11 25H2)	Supported
Galaxy Book 2 Pro 360	Windows 10 (21H2)	One UI Book 5 (Windows 11 25H2)	Supported
Galaxy Book 3	One UI Book 5 (Windows 11 22H2)	One UI Book 7 (Windows 11 25H2)	Supported
Galaxy Book 3 360	One UI Book 5 (Windows 11 22H2)	One UI Book 7 (Windows 11 25H2)	Supported
Galaxy Book 3 Pro	One UI Book 5 (Windows 11 22H2)	One UI Book 7 (Windows 11 25H2)	Supported
Galaxy Book 3 Pro 360	One UI Book 5 (Windows 11 22H2)	One UI Book 7 (Windows 11 25H2)	Supported
Galaxy Book 3 Ultra	One UI Book 5 (Windows 11 22H2)	One UI Book 7 (Windows 11 25H2)	Supported
Galaxy Book 4	One UI Book 6 (Windows 11 23H2)	One UI Book 7 (Windows 11 25H2)	Supported
Galaxy Book 4 360	One UI Book 6 (Windows 11 23H2)	One UI Book 7 (Windows 11 25H2)	Supported
Galaxy Book 4 Pro	One UI Book 6 (Windows 11 23H2)	One UI Book 7 (Windows 11 25H2)	Supported
Galaxy Book 4 Pro 360	One UI Book 6 (Windows 11 23H2)	One UI Book 7 (Windows 11 25H2)	Supported
Galaxy Book 4 Ultra	One UI Book 6 (Windows 11 23H2)	One UI Book 7 (Windows 11 25H2)	Supported
Galaxy Book 4 Edge	One UI Book 6 (Windows 11 23H2)	One UI Book 7 (Windows 11 25H2)	Supported
Galaxy Book 5	One UI Book 6 (Windows 11 24H2)	One UI Book 7 (Windows 11 25H2)	Supported
Galaxy Book 5 360	One UI Book 6 (Windows 11 24H2)	One UI Book 7 (Windows 11 25H2)	Supported
Galaxy Book 5 Pro	One UI Book 6 (Windows 11 24H2)	One UI Book 7 (Windows 11 25H2)	Supported
Galaxy Book 5 Pro 360	One UI Book 6 (Windows 11 24H2)	One UI Book 7 (Windows 11 25H2)	Supported
Galaxy Book 6	One UI Book 8 (Windows 11 25H2)	One UI Book 8 (Windows 11 25H2)	Supported
Galaxy Book 6 Pro	One UI Book 8 (Windows 11 25H2)	One UI Book 8 (Windows 11 25H2)	Supported
Galaxy Book 6 Ultra	One UI Book 8 (Windows 11 25H2)	One UI Book 8 (Windows 11 25H2)	Supported
Galaxy Book 6 Edge	One UI Book 8 (Windows 11 25H2)	One UI Book 8 (Windows 11 25H2)	Supported

=== Watches ===
==== Gear series (2016–2018) ====
Device	Original version	Current version	Status	Ref.
Gear S3 Classic / Frontier	Tizen 2.3.2	One UI Watch 1.5 (Tizen 4.0.0.7)	Unsupported	
Gear Sport	Tizen 3.0.0	One UI Watch 1.5 (Tizen 4.0.0.7)	Unsupported	

==== Galaxy Watch series (2018−) ====
Device	Original version	Current version	Status	Ref.
Galaxy Watch	Tizen 4.0.0.0	One UI Watch 2.0 (Tizen 5.5.0.2)	Unsupported	
Galaxy Watch Active	One UI Watch 1.0 (Tizen 4.0.0.3)	One UI Watch 2.0 (Tizen 5.5.0.2)	Unsupported	
Galaxy Watch Active 2	One UI Watch 1.5 (Tizen 4.0.0.7)	One UI Watch 2.0 (Tizen 5.5.0.2)	Unsupported	
Galaxy Watch 3	One UI Watch 2.0 (Tizen 5.5.0.1)	One UI Watch 2.0 (Tizen 5.5.0.2)	Unsupported	
Galaxy Watch 4 / Watch 4 Classic	One UI Watch 3.0 (Wear OS 3.0)	One UI Watch 8.0 (Wear OS 6.0)	Unsupported	
Galaxy Watch 5 / Watch 5 Pro	One UI Watch 4.5 (Wear OS 3.5)	One UI Watch 8.0 (Wear OS 6.0)	Supported	
Galaxy Watch 6 / Watch 6 Classic	One UI Watch 5.0 (Wear OS 4.0)	One UI Watch 8.0 (Wear OS 6.0)	Supported	
Galaxy Watch FE	One UI Watch 5.0 (Wear OS 4.0)	One UI Watch 8.0 (Wear OS 6.0)	Supported	
Galaxy Watch 7	One UI Watch 6.0 (Wear OS 5.0)	One UI Watch 8.0 (Wear OS 6.0)	Supported	
Galaxy Watch Ultra	One UI Watch 6.0 (Wear OS 5.0)	One UI Watch 8.0 (Wear OS 6.0)	Supported	
Galaxy Watch 8 / Watch 8 Classic	One UI Watch 8.0 (Wear OS 6.0)	One UI Watch 8.0 (Wear OS 6.0)	Supported	
Galaxy Watch Ultra (2025)	One UI Watch 8.0 (Wear OS 6.0)	One UI Watch 8.0 (Wear OS 6.0)	Supported	
Galaxy Watch 9	One UI Watch 9.0 (Wear OS 7.0)	One UI Watch 9.0 (Wear OS 7.0)	Supported	
Galaxy Watch Ultra 2	One UI Watch 9.0 (Wear OS 7.0)	One UI Watch 9.0 (Wear OS 7.0)	Supported	

=== Headsets ===
Device	Original version	Current version	Status	Ref.
Galaxy XR	One UI XR (Android XR)	One UI XR (Android XR)	Supported	

== See also ==
- Comparison of mobile operating systems
- List of custom Android distributions

== References and notes ==
Preceded by Samsung Experience	One UI; 2019-Present	Succeeded by Current
