= Samsung Galaxy A41 =

Mid-range Android smartphone from Samsung

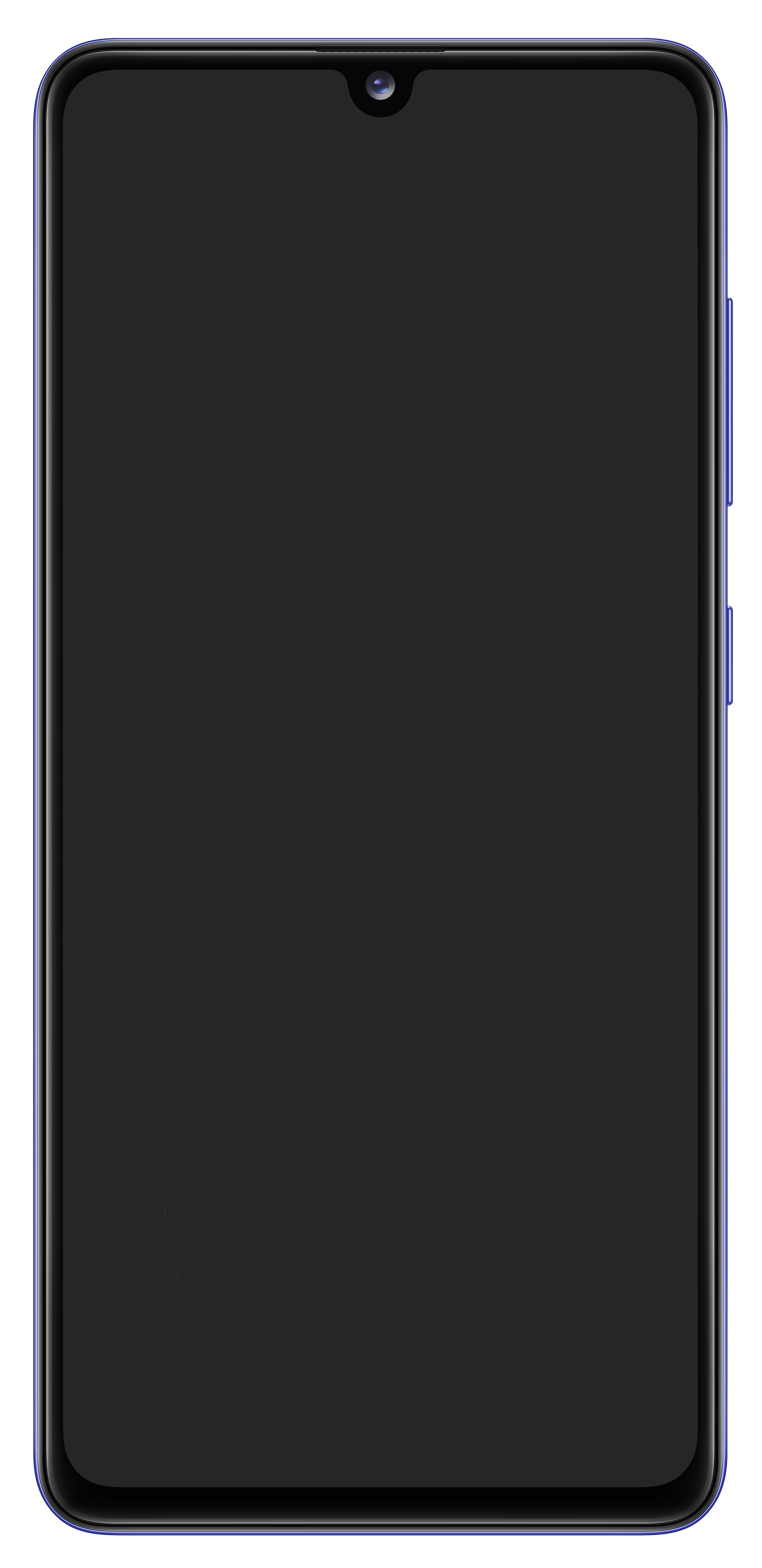
- Brand: Samsung
- Manufacturer: Samsung Electronics
- Type: Smartphone
- Series: Samsung Galaxy A series
- First released: 22 May 2020; 6 years ago
- Predecessor: Samsung Galaxy A40
- Successor: Samsung Galaxy A42 5G
- Related: Samsung Galaxy A01; Samsung Galaxy A11; Samsung Galaxy A21; Samsung Galaxy A21s; Samsung Galaxy A31; Samsung Galaxy A51; Samsung Galaxy A71
- Compatible networks: 2G; 3G; 4G LTE
- Form factor: Slate
- Dimensions: Europe: 149.9 mm (5.90 in) H 69.8 mm (2.75 in) W 7.9 mm (0.31 in) D Japan: 152.9 mm (6.02 in) H 70.4 mm (2.77 in) W 8.1 mm (0.32 in) D
- Weight: Europe: 152 g (5.4 oz); Japan: 160 g (5.6 oz)
- Operating system: Original: Android 10 with One UI 2.1; Current: Android 12 with One UI 4.1
- System-on-chip: MediaTek Helio P65 or Helio G80 (MT6768)
- CPU: Octa-core (2x2.0 GHz Cortex-A75 & 6x1.7 GHz Cortex-A55)
- GPU: Mali-G52 MC2
- Memory: 4 GB RAM
- Storage: 64 GB
- Removable storage: microSDXC, expandable up to 512 GB
- Battery: 3500 mAh lithium-polymer
- Rear camera: Primary: Sony IMX 582; 48 MP, f/2.0, 26mm, 1/2.0", 0.8µm, PDAF; Ultrawide: Samsung ISOCELL S5K4HAYX; 8 MP, f/2.2, 123°, 1/4.0", 1.12µm; Depth: GalaxyCore GC5035; 5 MP, f/2.4; LED flash, panorama, HDR; 1080p@30fps
- Front camera: Sony IMX 576 or Samsung S5K2X5; 25 MP, f/2.2, 25mm (wide), 1/2.8", 0.9µm; 1080p@30fps
- Display: 6.1 in (150 mm) 1080 x 2400 px (431 ppi) Super AMOLED; 20:9 aspect ratio
- Sound: Loudspeaker, 3.5 mm headphone jack
- Connectivity: Wi-Fi: 802.11 a/b/g/n/ac Wi-Fi Direct; Wi-Fi hotspot Bluetooth: 5.0; USB: 2.0, Type-C 1.0 reversible connector FeliCa (Japanese models only)
- Data inputs: Sensors: Accelerometer; Proximity sensor; Fingerprint scanner (optical); Gyroscope; Compass; Hall sensor
- Model: European model: SM-A415F; Japanese models: SCV48 (au); SC-41A (NTT Docomo)
- SAR: Head: 0.59 W/kg; Body: 1.50 W/kg
- Website: Official website

The Samsung Galaxy A41 is a mid-range Android-based smartphone developed by Samsung Electronics as part of their 2020 A-series smartphone lineup. It was announced on 18 March 2020, and first released in Europe on 22 May 2020 as the successor to the Galaxy A40.

== Specifications ==
=== Design ===
The display is made of Corning Gorilla Glass 3, while the back panel and sides are made of plastic. The device is equipped with GSM, HSPA, LTE, Wi-Fi 802.11 a/b/g/n/ac dual-band, Wi-Fi Direct, Bluetooth 5.0 with A2DP and LE. It has USB Type-C 2.0 with 3.5mm jack.

Galaxy A41
- Prism Crush Black
- Prism Crush Silver
- Prism Crush Blue
- Prism Crush Red

=== Hardware ===
==== Display ====
The phone has a 6.1-inch FHD+ Super AMOLED display, with a screen-to-body ratio of 85.9% and an aspect ratio of 20:9 to match that of other Galaxy smartphones sold in 2020. An optical, under-display fingerprint reader replaces the rear-mounted one seen on the A40.

==== Camera ====
The new L-shaped rear camera system (similar to the ones seen on newer Samsung phones) utilizes three cameras, a 48 MP wide lens, an 8 MP ultrawide lens and a 5 MP depth sensor. A U-shaped screen cut-out houses the 25 MP sensor for the front-facing camera. Both camera systems are capable of recording 1080p video at 30fps.

==== Processor and memory ====
The Galaxy A41 uses the MediaTek Helio P65 processor, available with 64 GB of storage (which uses eMMC) and 4 GB of RAM. Storage can be expanded up to 512 GB through a microSDXC card.

==== Battery ====
The device is powered by a 3500 mAh battery, with support for fast charging at up to 15 W.

=== Software ===
The phone comes with Android 10 and Samsung’s custom One UI 2.1 software overlay. Like its predecessor, the Galaxy A40, the phone is eligible for 4 years of security patches and two major Android OS upgrades.

	Pre-installed OS	OS Upgrades history		End of support
	Pre-installed OS	1st	2nd	End of support
A41	Android 10 (One UI 2.1)	Android 11 (One UI 3.1); April 2021	Android 12 (One UI 4.1); May 2022	June 2024
