= Samsung Galaxy M53 5G =

Android-based smartphone

Samsung Galaxy M53 5G Samsung Galaxy Quantum 3
- Brand: Samsung Galaxy
- Manufacturer: Samsung Electronics
- Type: Phablet
- Series: Samsung Galaxy M series
- First released: April 7, 2022; 4 years ago
- Predecessor: Samsung Galaxy M52 5G
- Successor: Samsung Galaxy M54 5G; Samsung Galaxy Quantum 4
- Related: Samsung Galaxy M13; Samsung Galaxy M23 5G; Samsung Galaxy M33 5G
- Compatible networks: GSM / HSPA / LTE / 5G
- Form factor: Slate
- Colors: Green, Blue, Emerald Brown
- Dimensions: 164.7 mm (6.48 in) H 77 mm (3.0 in) W 7.4 mm (0.29 in) D
- Weight: 176 g (6.2 oz)
- Operating system: Original: Android 12 with One UI 4.1; Current: Android 16 with One UI 8
- System-on-chip: MediaTek MT6877 Dimensity 900 5G (6 nm)
- CPU: Octa-core (2x2.4 GHz Cortex-A78 & 6x2.0 GHz Cortex-A55)
- GPU: Mali-G68 MC4
- Memory: 6GB, 8GB RAM
- Storage: 128GB, 256GB
- Removable storage: microSDXC
- SIM: Dual SIM (Nano-SIM, dual stand-by)
- Battery: 5000 mAh
- Charging: Fast charging 25W
- Rear camera: 108 MP, f/1.8, (wide), PDAF; 8 MP, f/2.2, (ultrawide), 1/4", 1.12 μm 2 MP, f/2.4, (depth); 2 MP, f/2.4, (macro); LED flash, panorama, HDR; 4K@30fps, 1080p@30/60fps
- Front camera: 32 MP, f/2.2, 26mm (wide); 4K@30fps, 1080p@30fps
- Display: 6.7 in (170 mm), Infinity-O Display; 1080 x 2408 resolution, 20:9 aspect ratio (~394 ppi density); Super AMOLED Plus, 120Hz refresh rate
- Sound: Loudspeaker
- Connectivity: Wi-Fi 802.11 a/b/g/n/ac, dual-band, Wi-Fi Direct, hotspot Bluetooth 5.2, A2DP, LE; A-GPS, GLONASS, GALILEO, BDS
- Data inputs: USB Type-C 2.0; Fingerprint scanner (side-mounted); Accelerometer; Gyroscope; Proximity sensor; Compass
- Model: SM-M536B, SM-M536B/DS, SM-M536B/DSN, SM-M536S
- Website: www.samsung.com/in/smartphones/galaxy-m53/

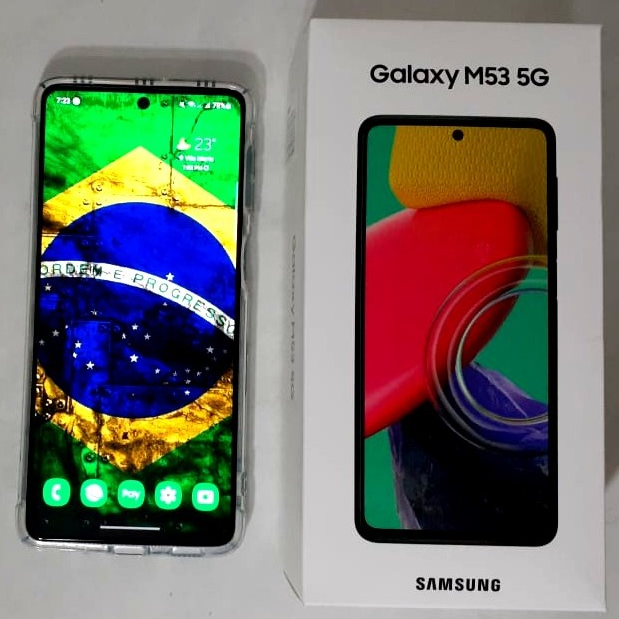
Samsung Galaxy M53 5G

The Samsung Galaxy M53 5G is a mid-range Android-based smartphone developed by Samsung Electronics as a part of its Galaxy M series. This phone was announced on 7 April 2022. Its key features are MediaTek's SoC Dimensity 900 5G, 120 Hz Super AMOLED Plus display, a triple camera setup with a 108 MP main camera and a 5000 mAh battery with 25W fast charging support.

It is the last Samsung smartphone ever to be intended officially for market of the Russian Federation.

== Specifications ==
=== Hardware ===
Samsung Galaxy M53 5G is powered by MediaTek Dimensity 900 5G SoC with 6 nm process, an integrated 5G modem, an octa-core CPU comprising a high performance cluster with 2x 2.4 GHz Cortex-A78 Gold cores and a power efficiency cluster with 6x 2.0 GHz Cortex-A55 Silver cores and Mali-G68 MC4 GPU. It has a 6.7 inch (172 mm) Super AMOLED Plus display with 1080x2400 pixels resolution, 20:9 aspect ratio, ~393 ppi pixel density, 120 Hz refresh rate and 16M colors. It features a triple camera setup at the rear with a 108 MP main camera with f/1.8 aperture, an 8 MP ultrawide-angle camera with f/2.2 aperture, a 2 MP macro camera with f/2.4 aperture, and a 2 MP depth camera with f/2.4 aperture. There is a 32 MP front-facing camera with f/2.2 aperture located in the circular punch hole of the display. It supports 4K video recording from the main camera and the front facing camera. It has a 5000 mAh non-removable battery with 25W fast charging support. However, there isn't a 25W charger in the box and it needs to be bought separately. It comes with 6/8 GB RAM and 128 / 256 GB internal storage and supports memory expansion via the hybrid SIM/microSD card slot up to 1 TB.

=== Software ===
Samsung Galaxy M53 5G is shipped with Android 12 and Samsung's proprietary user interface One UI 4.1. It comes with Knox Security Suite and AltZMode.
