= Samsung Galaxy M33 5G =

Android-based smartphone

- Also known as: Samsung Galaxy Jump2 (South Korea)
- Brand: Samsung Galaxy
- Manufacturer: Samsung Electronics
- Type: Smartphone
- Series: Samsung Galaxy M series
- First released: April 8, 2022; 4 years ago
- Predecessor: Samsung Galaxy M32; Samsung Galaxy M32 5G
- Successor: Samsung Galaxy M34 5G
- Related: Samsung Galaxy M13; Samsung Galaxy M23 5G; Samsung Galaxy M53 5G
- Form factor: Slate
- Colors: Deep Ocean Blue, Mystique Green, Emerald Brown
- Dimensions: 165.4 mm (6.51 in) H 76.9 mm (3.03 in) W 9.4 mm (0.37 in) D
- Weight: 198 g (7.0 oz)
- Operating system: Android 12 with One UI 4.1 upgradeable to Android 16 with One UI 8.0
- System-on-chip: Samsung Exynos 1280 (5 nm)
- CPU: Octa-core (2x2.4 GHz Cortex-A78 & 6x2.0 GHz Cortex-A55)
- GPU: Mali-G68 MP4
- Memory: 6 GB, 8 GB RAM
- Storage: 128 GB UFS 2.2
- Removable storage: microSDXC up to 1TB
- SIM: Dual SIM (Nano-SIM, dual stand-by)
- Battery: International: 5000 mAh; India: 6000 mAh
- Charging: Super Fast charging up to 25W (charging adapter not included)
- Rear camera: 50 MP, f/1.8, (wide), PDAF; 5 MP, f/2.2, (ultrawide), 1/4", 1.12 μm 2 MP, f/2.4, (depth); 2 MP, f/2.4, (macro); LED flash, panorama, HDR; 4K@30fps, 1080p@30/60fps, 720p@30fps
- Front camera: 8 MP, f/2.2, 26mm (wide); 4K@30fps, 1080p@30fps
- Display: 6.6 in (170 mm), Infinity-V display 1080 x 2408 resolution, 20:9 ratio (~394 ppi density); TFT LCD, 120Hz refresh rate Corning Gorilla Glass 5
- Sound: Loudspeaker, 3.5mm Audio Jack
- Connectivity: Wi-Fi 802.11 a/b/g/n/ac, dual-band, Wi-Fi Direct, hotspot Bluetooth 5.1, A2DP, LE
- Data inputs: USB Type-C 2.0; Fingerprint scanner (side-mounted); Accelerometer; Gyroscope; Proximity sensor; Compass
- Model: SM-M336B, SM-M336B/DS, SM-M336BU, SM-M336BU/DS, SM-M336K
- SAR: 1.04 W/kg (head) 1.38 W/kg (body)
- Website: www.samsung.com/in/smartphones/galaxy-m/galaxy-m33-5g-blue-128gb-storage-6gb-ram-sm-m336bzbpins/

The Samsung Galaxy M33 5G is an Android-based smartphone produced by Samsung. This phone was announced on 4 March 2022 with general availability from 8 April 2022. Galaxy M33 5G is powered by 5 nm-based chipset consisting of 8 cores at up to 2.4 GHz. It also comes with RAM Plus, which is the Samsung marketing name for memory paging on Android, using up to 12 GB of device storage as virtual RAM. It also came equipped with 6.6-inch FHD+ display with 120 Hz refresh rate. The phone also brings Power Cool Tech and Voice Focus feature.
