= Samsung Galaxy Tab S5e =

2019 mid-range tablet by Samsung Electronics

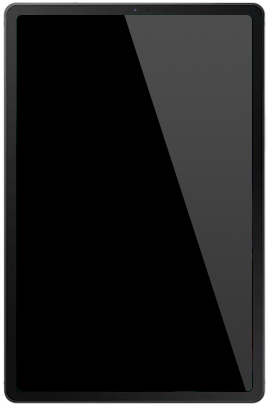
- Samsung Galaxy Tab S5e
- Brand: Samsung
- Manufacturer: Samsung Electronics
- Type: Tablet computer
- Series: Galaxy Tab S
- Family: Samsung Galaxy
- First released: February 20, 2019; 7 years ago
- Availability by region: April 26, 2019; 7 years ago
- Discontinued: April 2, 2020; 6 years ago
- Successor: Samsung Galaxy Tab S6 Lite
- Related: Samsung Galaxy Tab S4; Samsung Galaxy Tab S6
- Compatible networks: 2G, 3G, 4G
- Form factor: Bar
- Colors: Black, Gold, Silver
- Dimensions: 245 mm (9.6 in) H 160 mm (6.3 in) W 5.5 mm (0.22 in) D
- Weight: 400 g (14 oz)
- Operating system: Original: Android 9 "Pie" with One UI 1.1; Current: Android 11 with One UI 3.1
- System-on-chip: Qualcomm Snapdragon 670 (10 nm)
- CPU: Octa-core (2x2.0 GHz 360 Gold & 6x1.7 GHz Kryo 360 Silver)
- GPU: Adreno 615
- Memory: 4 or 6 GB RAM
- Storage: 64 or 128 GB eMMC 5.1
- Removable storage: microSDXC
- SIM: Nano-SIM
- Battery: Li-Po 7,040 mAh
- Charging: 18W Fast charging
- Rear camera: 13 MP, f/2.0, 26mm, 1/3.4", 1.0μm, AF; HDR, panorama 4K@30fps
- Front camera: 8 MP, f/2.0, 26mm, 1/4", 1.12μm 1080p@30fps
- Display: 10.5 in (270 mm); 1600 × 2560 px resolution, 16:10 ratio (~288 ppi density)
- Sound: Stereo speakers (4 speakers); Tuned by AKG/HARMAN
- Connectivity: Wi-Fi 802.11 a/b/g/n/ac, dual-band, Wi-Fi Direct, hotspot Bluetooth 5.0, A2DP, LE
- Data inputs: Fingerprint scanner (side-mounted); Accelerometer; Gyroscope; Proximity sensor; Compass
- Water resistance: none
- Model: SM-T720 (Wi-Fi); SM-T725 (LTE)
- SAR: 1.03 W/kg (head)

The Samsung Galaxy Tab S5e is a mid-range Android-based tablet computer manufactured, developed, produced, and marketed by Samsung Electronics. It was announced on February 15, 2019, and features an AMOLED display. It was introduced five days later at the Galaxy Unpacked event alongside the Galaxy S10 series. It became available on April 26, 2019.

== Specifications ==
=== Hardware ===
The Samsung Galaxy Tab S5e is built with an aluminum frame and an aluminum back panel. The device is available in black, gold, and silver colors. It has stereo loudspeakers with AKG tuning as well as a USB-C port for charging and connecting other accessories.

The Samsung Galaxy Tab S5e uses the Qualcomm Snapdragon 670 system-on-chip processor, with 4 GB or 6 GB of RAM and 64 GB or 128 GB of eMMC 5.1 internal storage.

The Samsung Galaxy Tab S5e has a 7,040 mAh battery and is capable of fast charging at up to 18 W.

The Samsung Galaxy Tab S5e features a 10.5-inch 2560 x 1600 Super AMOLED display with a 16:10 aspect ratio.

The Samsung Galaxy Tab S5e includes a single rear-facing camera. It has a 13-megapixel sensor and a wide 26 mm f/2.0 lens that is capable of recording 4K video at 30 fps. It also includes a front-facing camera which uses an 8-megapixel sensor.

=== Software ===
The Samsung Galaxy Tab S5e shipped with Android 9 Pie with One UI 1.1. Over time, Samsung updated the tablet's software, receiving Android 10 with One UI 2.1, and eventually receiving its final software update with Android 11 with One UI 3.1.
