= Samsung Developer Conference =

Annual technology conference

- Frequency: Annually
- Venue: Moscone Center / San Jose Convention Center
- Location: San Francisco / San José
- Country: United States
- Inaugurated: 2013
- Most recent: October 3, 2024
- Attendance: 5,000 Attendees (2019)
- Organizer: Samsung Electronics
- Website: https://www.samsungdeveloperconference.com

Samsung Developer Conference, also known as SDC, is an annual technology conference held by Samsung Electronics since 2013. The event focus in showcasing the latest technology advances in mobile software and Samsung products, such as SmartThings, Bixby, Tizen and One UI. From 2018, it has also unveiled the Infinity Flex display technology for foldable smartphones such as Samsung Galaxy Z Fold. The 2020 event was cancelled due to COVID-19 pandemic, and the 2021 event was held online due to the pandemic. and the 2022 event returned to an in-person format. since 2019.

== Overview ==
SDC started in 2013 as a technology event for people in the industry to “engage with industry leaders, collaborate with fellow developers, and learn about new Samsung tools and SDKs”, according to Samsung. The event usually takes place between October and November every year.

The first event was held in a hotel in San Francisco, but by the second edition they changed the venue to the McEnery Convention Center in San José.

During the first editions, SDC focused on mobile technologies, but in recent years it has also included sessions about Artificial Intelligence and Internet of Things.

== History ==
The first SDC edition was held from October 27 to 29 of 2013 in Westin ST. Francis Hotel in San Francisco, where the company discussed about Samsung Mobile SDK, Smart TV features and multi-screen. The following year, the venue changed to the Moscone West Convention Center in San Francisco, and mainly focused on Wearable devices and Virtual Reality.

After a year of hiatus in 2015, SDC 2016 came back with sessions centering mainly on Virtual Reality, which had been a big push for Injong Rhee (former Vice president and head of R&D in Samsung) and Samsung Developers. Even though Samsung has struggled to generate enthusiasm for many of its software products, SDC 2017 attracted 5,000 people to the event, which focused in Bixby, SmartThings and AR.

The fifth edition held in 2018 was a turning point for SDC, because Samsung unveiled the prototype of its first foldable smartphone, the Infinity Flex Display, which would later become the Galaxy Fold. SDC 2019 changed locations from San Francisco to San Jose Convention Center in California. With 5,000 participants, the conference discussed topics such as Blockchain, One UI, Bixby, SmartThings and Foldable UX Guide.

SDC 2020 was cancelled due to COVID-19 pandemic and the 2021 edition was the first to be held entirely online. The SDC22 conference took place in Oct. 12, 2022 at the Moscone North in San Francisco, bringing the event back to a physical venue. SDC23 was held on Oct. 5, again at the Moscone North in San Francisco. SDC24 was held on Oct. 3 at the San Jose McEnery Convention Center. SDC25 did not occur in 2025 and Samsung did not release the usual announcements or developer registrations for the year. That year, two other conferences, the Samsung AI Forum and the Samsung Tech Conference were organized by the company instead. SDC 2026 was also not held in 2026.

== See also ==
- WWDC
- Google I/O
- Microsoft Build
