= Samsung Galaxy M23 5G =

2022 mid-range smartphone by Samsung Electronics

Samsung Galaxy M23 5G Samsung Galaxy F23 5G (in India)Samsung Galaxy Buddy 2 (in South Korea)
- Also known as: Samsung Galaxy Buddy 2 (in South Korea)
- Brand: Samsung
- Manufacturer: Samsung Electronics
- Type: Phablet
- Series: Galaxy M/Galaxy F
- Family: Samsung Galaxy
- First released: M23: March 4, 2022; 4 years ago F23: March 8, 2022; 4 years ago
- Availability by region: M23: April 8, 2022; 4 years ago
- Predecessor: Samsung Galaxy M22; Samsung Galaxy F22; Samsung Galaxy A22 5G (Samsung Galaxy Buddy)
- Successor: Samsung Galaxy A15 5G (Galaxy Buddy 3)
- Related: Samsung Galaxy A23; Samsung Galaxy M13; Samsung Galaxy M33 5G; Samsung Galaxy M53 5G; Samsung Galaxy F13
- Compatible networks: 2G / 3G / 4G LTE / 5G NR
- Form factor: Slate
- Colors: Deep Green, Light Blue, Orange Copper
- Dimensions: 165.5 mm (6.52 in) H 77 mm (3.0 in) W 8.4 mm (0.33 in) D
- Weight: 198 g (7.0 oz)
- Operating system: Original: Android 12 with One UI 4.1; Current: Android 14 with One UI 6.1
- System-on-chip: Qualcomm SM7225 Snapdragon 750G
- CPU: Octa-core (2.2 GHz & 1.8 GHz)
- GPU: Adreno 619
- Modem: Qualcomm Snapdragon X52 5G
- Memory: 4GB, 6GB RAM
- Storage: 128GB eMMC 5.1
- Removable storage: microSDXC (supports up to 1TB)
- SIM: M23: Single SIM (Nano-SIM) or Dual SIM (Nano-SIM, dual stand-by); F23: Dual SIM (Nano-SIM, dual stand-by)
- Battery: Li-Po 5000 mAh
- Charging: Fast charging up to 25 W (charger not included)
- Rear camera: 50 MP, f/1.8 (wide), PDAF; 8 MP, f/2.2, 123˚ (ultrawide), 1/4", 1.12 μm 2 MP, f/2.4 (macro); LED flash, panorama, HDR; 4K@30fps, 1080p@30fps, 720p@480fps
- Front camera: 8 MP, f/2.2, (wide); 1080p@30fps
- Display: 6.6 in (170 mm), PLS; 1080 x 2408 pixels, 20:9 aspect ratio (~400 ppi density)
- Sound: Loudspeaker; 3.5mm jack
- Connectivity: Wi-Fi 802.11 a/b/g/n/ac, dual-band, Wi-Fi Direct, hotspot Bluetooth 5.0, A2DP, LE; A-GPS, BEIDOU, BDS, GLONASS, GALILEO, NFC, QZSS
- Data inputs: Multi-touch screen; USB-C 2.0
- Water resistance: none
- Model: M23: SM-M236B/DS, SM-M236B/DS, SM-M236L (Buddy 2); F23 SM-E236B, SM-E236B/DS

The Samsung Galaxy M23 5G is an Android-based smartphone manufactured, designed, developed and marketed by Samsung Electronics. This phone was announced on March 4, 2022. In India, the Galaxy M23 5G was released as the Samsung Galaxy F23 5G. In South Korea, the smartphone was released as the Samsung Galaxy Buddy 2 (Korean: 삼성 갤럭시 버디2) and was sold by LG Uplus mobile operator.

== Design ==
The front is made of Corning Gorilla Glass 5, while the back and frame are made of matte plastic.

From the back, the smartphone looks like the Samsung Galaxy M13.

At the bottom, is the USB-C port, speaker, microphone, and 3.5 mm audio jack. On the top, there is an additional microphone. On the left side, there is a Dual SIM tray with a microSD slot . On the right side are the volume control buttons and the smartphone lock button, which has a built-in fingerprint scanner.

The Samsung Galaxy M23 5G was sold in 3 colors: Rose Gold, Green and Blue.

== Specifications ==
=== Hardware ===
==== Platform ====
The device received a Qualcomm Snapdragon 750G processor and an Adreno 619 GPU.

==== Battery ====
The battery has a capacity of 5000 mAh. There is also support for 25 W fast charging.

==== Camera ====
The smartphone features a rear triple-camera setup, which consists of a 50 MP (f/1.8) wide-angle lens with phase autofocus, a 8 MP (f/2.2) ultrawide-angle lens with a 123° field of view and 2 MP (f/2.4) macro lens. The main camera is capable of recording video in resolution 4K@30fps. The wide-angle front-facing camera has a resolution of 8 MP, an aperture of f/2.2 and the ability to record video in a resolution of 1080p@30fps.

==== Screen ====
The Samsung Galaxy M23 5G features the TFT LCD, Infinity-V (with V-shaped notch) display with a 6.6" diagonal, a Full HD+ (2408 × 1080 pixels) resolution, 400 ppi pixel density, 20:9 aspect ratio, and a 120 Hz refresh rate.

==== Memory ====
Samsung Galaxy M23 5G was sold in 4/64, 4/128 and 6/128 GB configurations. The storage can be expanded by microSD card up to 1 TB

=== Software ===
The smartphone was released on One UI 4.1 based on Android 12. Later, it was updated to One UI 6.1 based on Android 14
