= Good Lock =

Mobile software application

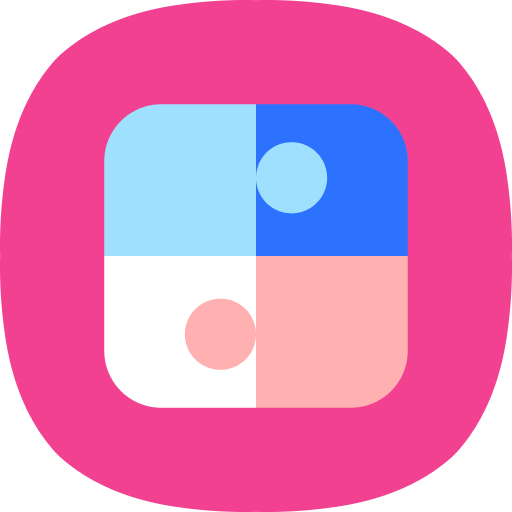
- Developer: Good Lock Labs (Samsung Electronics)
- Release: March 2016; 10 years ago
- Stable release: 3.0.14.2 / 30 October 2025
- Operating system: Android
- Platform: Samsung Galaxy
- Type: System utilities
- As of: 20 June 2026

Home menu of Good Lock app, most recent version 2026 (screenshot taken on Samsung S26)

Good Lock (Korean: 굿락) is a software suite to tweak and customize the user interface and experience on Samsung Galaxy devices. It is developed by Good Lock Labs in cooperation with Samsung, and can be downloaded from the Galaxy Store.

Good Lock was first released in April 2016. Responding to customer demand, it was revived in 2018 for the Galaxy S7, S8, S9 and Note 8 lines running Android Oreo. Good Lock has continued to be developed since then. Good Lock 6.0, was released alongside One UI 6.0 in Q4 2023.

While it initially launched in South Korea, it has progressively expanded its availability to over 40 countries, with more being added.

== Modules ==
Good Lock uses modules that can be added by users, each of which provides a different sort of customization. Some of the many modules available include:

- ClockFace, which customizes the clock on the always-on display or lock screen
- KeysCafe, which customizes the Samsung Keyboard
- LockStar, which customizes the lock screen
- One Hand Operation+, which adds a customizable gesture control system
- Theme Park, which lets users create their own theme
- Home Up, which customizes the home screen, apps screen and share menu
- NavStar, which customizes the navigation bar
- QuickStar, which customizes the quick panel and the top info bar
- RegiStar, which customizes the order of Settings menu items
- Pentastic, which customizes the S Pen Air command menu, cursor, and sound
- Wonderland, which allows users to create motion wallpapers with 3D effects

== Reception ==
The website 9to5Google wrote about the first version of Good Lock: "crazy, complex, and even brilliant in places". SamMobile called it a "balanced effort". XDA Developers wrote about Good Lock in 2018 saying: "Samsung Good Lock genuinely changes a great deal of how the phone's UI looks and feels. This is something that other manufacturers don't allow.". In 2021, Tom's Guide wrote that Good Lock is "the first app you should install on your Samsung Galaxy phone".
