= Samsung Galaxy A30s =

2019 smartphone by Samsung Electronics

- Brand: Samsung Galaxy
- Manufacturer: Samsung Electronics
- Type: Smartphone
- Series: Samsung Galaxy A series
- Availability by region: August 22, 2019; 7 years ago
- Predecessor: Samsung Galaxy A30
- Successor: Samsung Galaxy A31
- Compatible networks: GSM / HSPA / LTE
- Form factor: bar
- Operating system: Android 9.0 (Pie) with One UI 1.0, upgradable to Android 11 with One UI 3.1
- System-on-chip: Samsung Exynos 7904 (14 nm)
- CPU: Octa-core (2x1.8 GHz Cortex-A73 & 6x1.6 GHz Cortex-A53)
- GPU: Mali-G71 MP2
- Memory: 3GB, 4GB LPDDR4 RAM
- Storage: 32GB, 64GB, 128GB
- Removable storage: MicroSD, up to 2TB
- Battery: 4000 mAh Li-Polymer Battery
- Rear camera: 25 MP, f/1.7, 27mm wide, PDAF; 8 MP, f/2.2, 13mm ultrawide, 1/4.0", 1.12 μm 5 MP, f/2.2, depth
- Front camera: 16 MP, f/2.0, 26mm (wide), 1/3.06", 1.0 μm
- Display: 6.4" HD+ Super AMOLED; 720 x 1560 pixels, 19.5:9 ratio (~268 ppi density)
- Connectivity: USB Type-C 2.0; Wi-Fi 802.11 a/b/g/n/ac, dual-band, Wi-Fi Direct, hotspot
- Data inputs: Sensors: Fingerprint (under display, optical), accelerometer, gyro, proximity, compass
- Model: SM-A307F/DS; SM-A307FN/DS (Global); SM-A307G/DS (LATAM); SM-A307GN/DS (APAC); SM-A307GT/DS (Brazil)
- SAR: 0.87 W/kg (head); 0.43 W/kg (body)
- Website: Samsung Galaxy A30s

The Samsung Galaxy A30s is a midrange Android smartphone by Samsung Electronics. It has a triple-camera setup with a 25 MP main camera, a 6.4 inches HD+ Infinity-V display, and a 4000 mAh Li-Po battery. It ships with Android Pie with OneUI 1.0 (can be updated up to Android 11 with One UI 3.1). It was released on August 22, 2019

== Specifications ==
=== Storage and memory ===
It comes with 3 or 4 GB of LPDDR4 RAM, and 32, 64 or 128 GB storage. It allows MicroSD cards, up to 2TB, through a MicroSDXC slot, which can also hold up to 2 nano-sim cards.

=== Software ===
It released with Android 9 Pie, using the first version of One UI, 1.0, Samsung's custom user interface.

In April 2020, it started receiving the One UI 2.0 update, with Android 10, which introduced dark mode for more layouts, more vivid icons and redesigned app folders.

In August 2021, it received its last Android and One UI version update, Android 11, with One UI 3.1, skipping 3.0 and going directly to 3.1.
