= Samsung Galaxy M14 5G =

2023 Android smartphone manufactured by Samsung

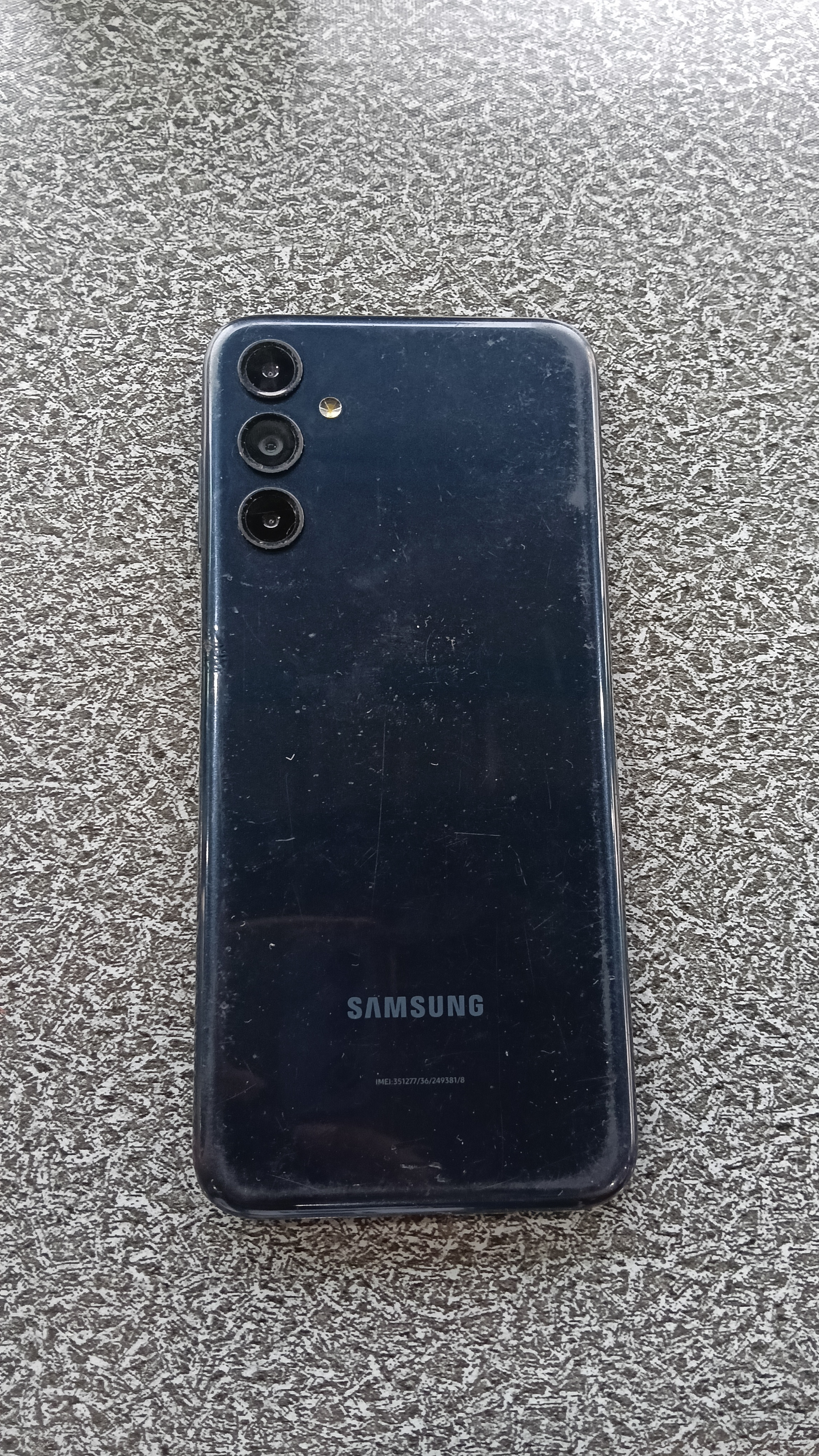
- Samsung Galaxy M14 5G in Navy Blue
- Brand: Samsung Galaxy
- Manufacturer: Samsung Electronics
- Type: Smartphone
- Series: Samsung Galaxy M series
- Availability by region: Global May 2023 (Samsung)
- Predecessor: Samsung Galaxy M13 5G
- Successor: Samsung Galaxy M15 5G
- Compatible networks: GSM / HSPA / LTE / 5G
- Form factor: Slate
- Colors: Navy Blue, Light Blue, Silver
- Dimensions: 166.8 mm (6.57 in) H 77.2 mm (3.04 in) W 9.4 mm (0.37 in) D
- Weight: 206 g (7.3 oz)
- Operating system: Android 13 with One UI 5.1 upgradable to Android 15 with One UI 7
- System-on-chip: Exynos 1330 (5nm)
- CPU: Octa-core (2x2.4 GHz Cortex-A78 & 6x2.0 GHz Cortex-A55)
- GPU: Mali-G68 MP2
- Memory: 4 and 6 GB RAM
- Storage: 64/128GB (eMMC 5.1)
- Removable storage: microSDHC
- SIM: Single SIM (Nano-SIM) or Dual SIM (Nano-SIM, dual stand-by)
- Battery: 6000 mAh
- Charging: Fast charging 15W (Global) and 25W (India)
- Rear camera: 50 MP, f/1.8, (wide), PDAF; 2 MP, f/2.4, (macro); 2 MP, f/2.4, (depth); LED flash, panorama, HDR; 1080p@30fps
- Front camera: 13 MP, f/2.0, (wide); 1080p@30fps
- Display: 6.6 inches Full HD+ 90Hz and Gorilla Glass 5
- Sound: Yes
- Connectivity: Wi-Fi 802.11 a/b/g/n/ac, dual-band, Wi-Fi Direct; Bluetooth 5.2, A2DP, LE
- Data inputs: Multi-touch screen; USB Type-C 2.0; Fingerprint scanner (side-mounted); Accelerometer; Proximity sensor; Compass
- Water resistance: Unsupported
- Model: SM-M146B, SM-M146B/DSN
- SAR: 0.48 W/kg (head); 1.53 W/kg (body)
- Made in: Vietnam(Global), United Kingdom(Global) and India

The Samsung Galaxy M14 5G is an Android-based smartphone designed and manufactured by Samsung Electronics. This phone was announced on March 8, 2023. It was released with Android 13 out of the box and received its first major OS update, Android 14, in December 2023 and its last major update, Android 15, based on One UI 7.
