= Samsung Galaxy A42 5G =

Mid-range Android smartphone from Samsung

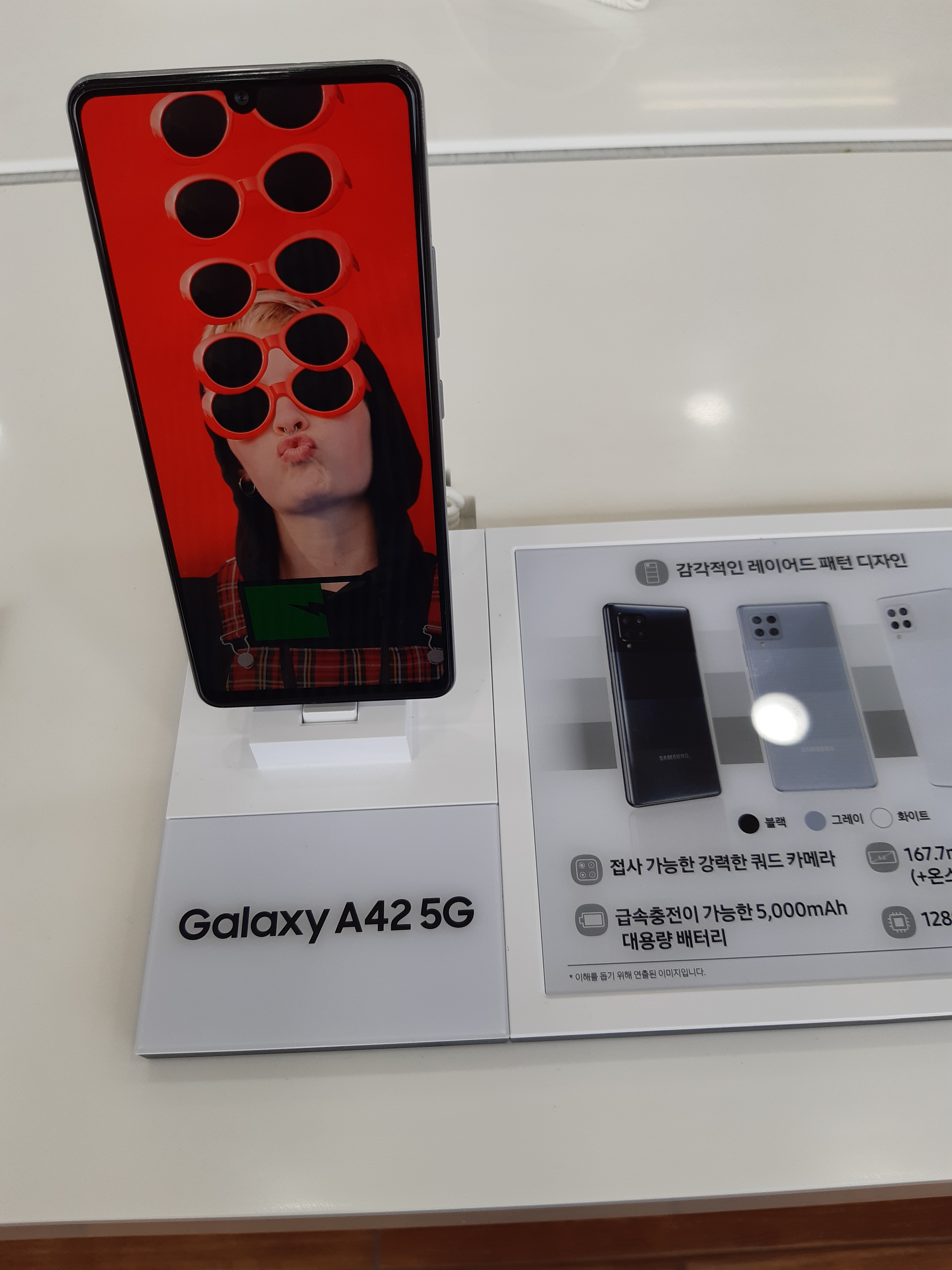
- Brand: Samsung
- Manufacturer: Samsung Electronics
- Type: Phablet
- Series: Galaxy A series
- First released: 11 November 2020; 5 years ago
- Predecessor: Samsung Galaxy A41
- Related: Samsung Galaxy A12; Samsung Galaxy A32; Samsung Galaxy A51 5G; Samsung Galaxy A52
- Compatible networks: 2G; 3G; 4G LTE; 5G
- Form factor: Slate
- Dimensions: 164.4 mm (6.47 in) H 75.9 mm (2.99 in) W 8.6 mm (0.34 in) D
- Weight: 193 g (6.8 oz)
- Operating system: Original: Global: Android 10 with One UI 2.5; South Korea and North America: Android 11 with One UI 3.1; Current: Global: Android 12 with One UI 4.1; South Korea and North America: Android 13 with One UI 5.1
- System-on-chip: Qualcomm Snapdragon 750G
- CPU: Octa-core (2x2.2 GHz & 6x1.7 GHz Kryo 570)
- GPU: Adreno 619
- Memory: 4, 6 or 8 GB RAM
- Storage: 128 GB
- Removable storage: microSDXC, expandable up to 512 GB
- Battery: 5000 mAh lithium-polymer
- Charging: 15W Adaptive Fast Charging
- Rear camera: Primary: Samsung ISOCELL S5KGM2; 48 MP, f/1.8, 24mm, 1/2.0", 0.8µm, PDAF; Ultrawide: Samsung ISOCELL S5K4HA; 8 MP, f/2.2, 13mm, 123°, 1/4.0", 1.12µm; Macro: GalaxyCore GC5035; 5 MP, f/2.4; Depth: GalaxyCore GC5035; 5 MP, f/2.4; LED flash, panorama, HDR; 4K@30fps, 1080p@30fps, 720p@480fps
- Front camera: SK Hynix Hi-2021; 20 MP, f/2.2, 25mm (wide), 1/2.78", 1.0µm; HDR; 1080p@30fps
- Display: 6.6 in (170 mm) 720p 720 x 1600 px (266 ppi) Super AMOLED; 20:9 aspect ratio
- Sound: Loudspeaker, 3.5 mm headphone jack
- Connectivity: Wi-Fi: 802.11 a/b/g/n/ac Wi-Fi Direct; Wi-Fi hotspot Bluetooth: 5.0; USB: 2.0, Type-C 1.0 reversible connector
- Data inputs: Sensors: Accelerometer; Proximity sensor; Fingerprint scanner (optical); Gyroscope; Compass; Hall sensor
- Water resistance: None
- Model: SM-A426B(Global); SM-A426U(Verizon); SM-A426N(KR); SM-A4260(HK); SM-S426DL(TracFone)
- SAR: Head: 1.15 W/kg; Body: 1.33 W/kg
- Website: www.samsung.com/us/smartphones/galaxy-a42-5g/

The Samsung Galaxy A42 5G is a mid-range Android-based smartphone developed by Samsung Electronics as part of its A series line. The phone was announced on 2 September 2020 during Samsung's virtual “Life Unstoppable” event, and first released on 11 November 2020 as a successor to the Galaxy A41. The phone comes pre-installed with Android 10 and Samsung's custom One UI 2.5 software overlay. It was rebranded as the Galaxy M42 5G in India as part of the M series line-up on 1 May 2021.

== Specifications ==
=== Design ===
The device have a plastic back and frame, and a glass front.

Galaxy A42 5G
- Prism Dot Gray
- Prism Dot White
- Prism Dot Black

=== Hardware ===
==== Display ====
The phone has a 6.6-inch HD+ Super AMOLED display, with a screen-to-body ratio of 84.3% and an aspect ratio of 20:9. Like its predecessor, there is an in-display optical fingerprint scanner.

==== Cameras ====
The Galaxy A42 5G has a quad-camera setup utilizing a 48 MP wide sensor, an 8 MP ultrawide sensor, a 5 MP macro sensor and a 5 MP depth sensor. The front-facing camera uses a 20 MP sensor, and is located in a U-shaped screen cutout. The rear camera is capable of recording 4K video at 30 fps, while the front camera is limited to 1080p.

==== Battery ====
The battery capacity is 5000 mAh, and fast charging is supported at up to 15 W.

==== Processor and memory ====
The Galaxy A42 5G is equipped with a Qualcomm Snapdragon 750G chipset. It has 128 GB of storage (which uses UFS 2.1) and 4, 6 or 8 GB of RAM, as well as a hybrid slot for dual Nano SIM and microSDXC cards.

=== Software ===
The Galaxy A42 5G was launched with Android 10 and One UI 2.5 for models sold internationally, while US, Canada, and South Korea models have Android 11 and One UI 3.1. It was eligible for 2 OS upgrades and 4 years of security updates.

	Pre-installed OS	OS Upgrades history		End of support
	Pre-installed OS	1st	2nd	End of support
A42 5G; Global models	Android 10 (One UI 2.5)	Android 11 (One UI 3.1); March 2021	Android 12 (One UI 4.0); January 2022 (One UI 4.1); March 2022	December 2024
A42 5G; US, Canada, and South Korea models	Android 11 (One UI 3.1)	Android 12 (One UI 4.0); May 2022	Android 13 (One UI 5.0); December 2022	December 2024
