= Samsung Galaxy M32 =

Samsung smartphone announced in June 2021

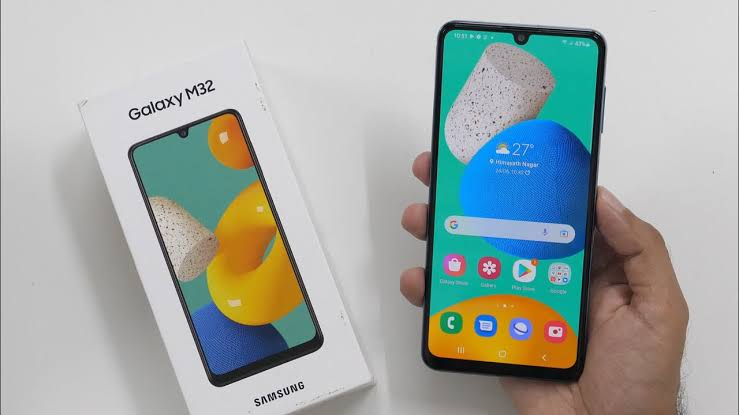
- Brand: Samsung Galaxy
- Manufacturer: Samsung Electronics
- Type: Smartphone
- Series: Samsung Galaxy M series
- First released: India: June 28, 2021; 5 years ago Other markets: July 2021; 5 years ago
- Predecessor: Samsung Galaxy M31
- Successor: Samsung Galaxy M33 5G
- Related: Samsung Galaxy M32 5G
- Form factor: Slate
- Colors: Black, Light Blue
- Weight: 180 g (6.3 oz) (international); 196 g (6.9 oz) (for India)
- Operating system: Shipped:Android 11, One UI 3.0 Current:Android 13, One UI 5
- System-on-chip: MediaTek Helio G80 MT6769V/CU (12nm)
- CPU: Octa-core CPU (2x2.0 GHz ARM Cortex-A75 & 6x1.8 GHz ARM Cortex-A55)
- GPU: ARM Mali-G52 MC2
- Memory: 4, 6 or 8 GB RAM
- Storage: 64 GB or 128 GB eMMC 5.1
- Removable storage: microSD card support up to 1 TB
- SIM: Dual nanoSIM, DSDS
- Battery: 5000 mAh Li-ion battery (international); 6000 mAh Li-ion battery (India)
- Charging: 25W Samsung Super Fast Charging(International), 15W Samsung Fast Charging(India)
- Rear camera: Quad-camera setup: 64 MP main camera 8 MP wide-angle camera 2 MP macro camera 2 MP depth sensor
- Front camera: 20 MP, f/2.2
- Display: 6.4 in (16 cm) Super AMOLED, 1080 x 2400 pixels, 20:9 ratio, ~411 ppi pixel density, 90 Hz refresh rate
- Sound: 3.5mm Jack
- Connectivity: Wi-Fi; Wi-Fi Direct; Wi-Fi Hotspot; Bluetooth 5.0; 3.5 mm headphone jack USB-C
- Model: SM-M325F
- SAR: 0.64 W/kg (head)
- Website: www.samsung.com/in/smartphones/galaxy-m/galaxy-m32-black-128gb-sm-m325fzkcins/

The Samsung Galaxy M32 is an Android-based smartphone manufactured by Samsung Electronics as part of the Samsung Galaxy M series. It was announced on 21 June 2021 for India and in July 2021 for other markets. Its key specifications include a 6.4-inch Super AMOLED display with 90 Hz refresh rate, and a quad-camera setup with a 64 MP main camera.

== Specifications ==
=== Design ===
The Samsung Galaxy M32 comes in Black and Light Blue colors. The phone's dimensions are 159.3 × 74 × 9.3 mm in the Indian variant, and 159.3 × 74 × 8.4 mm in other variants. The phone's weight is 196 grams in the Indian variant and 180 grams in other variants.

=== Hardware ===
The Samsung Galaxy M32 has a 6.4-inch Super AMOLED display with 90 Hz refresh rate, 1080×2400 pixels resolution, 20:9 aspect ratio and ~411 ppi pixel density. It is powered by MediaTek Helio G80 system-on-chip with an octa-core (2×2.0 GHz ARM Cortex-A75 & 6×1.8 GHz ARM Cortex-A55) CPU and an ARM Mali-G52 MC2 GPU. It comes with either 4 GB, 6 GB, or 8 GB of RAM and 64 GB or 128 GB of internal storage, which can be expanded up to 1 TB via the microSD card slot. Furthermore, it has a 6000 mAh Li-ion battery in the Indian variant, and a 5000 mAh Li-ion battery in other variants. The phone supports 25W fast charging but comes with a 15W fast charger.

==== Cameras ====
The Samsung Galaxy M32 has a quad-camera setup with a 64 MP main camera, an 8 MP ultrawide camera, a 2 MP macro camera, and a 2 MP depth sensor. It also has a 20 MP front camera. Both the cameras can record 1080p video at 30 fps.

=== Software ===
The Samsung Galaxy M32 comes preinstalled with Android 11 with One UI 3.1. This phone is eligible for Android 12 update.

== See also ==
- Samsung Galaxy M31
- Samsung Galaxy M series
- One UI
