= Samsung Galaxy M21 =

2020 mid-range smartphone by Samsung Electronics

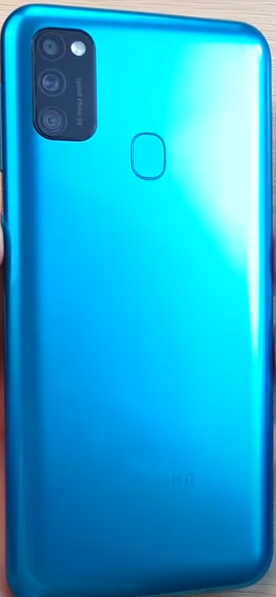
- Samsung Galaxy M21 device inside original packaging
- Brand: Samsung
- Manufacturer: Samsung Electronics
- Type: Smartphone
- Series: Galaxy M
- Family: Samsung Galaxy
- Availability by region: March 18, 2020; 6 years ago
- Predecessor: Samsung Galaxy M20
- Successor: Samsung Galaxy M21s; Samsung Galaxy M21 (2021 Edition); Samsung Galaxy M22
- Related: Samsung Galaxy M31; Samsung Galaxy M30s; Samsung Galaxy M11
- Compatible networks: LTE, 3G, 2G, Wi-Fi
- Dimensions: 159×75.1×8.9 mm (6.26×2.96×0.35 in)
- Weight: 188 g (7 oz)
- Operating system: Original: Android 10 with One UI Core 2.0; Current: Android 12 with One UI Core 4.1
- System-on-chip: Samsung Exynos 9 Octa 9611
- CPU: Exynos 9611 Octa-core (4x2.3 GHz Cortex-A73 & 4x1.7 GHz Cortex-A53)
- GPU: Mali-G72 MP3
- Memory: 4GB or 6GB RAM (Dependent on model)
- Storage: 64GB, 128GB (Expandable via microSD card up to 512GB)
- Removable storage: Expandable via microSD card (up to 512GB)
- Battery: 6000 mAh
- Charging: Fast charging at 15W, USB Type-C
- Rear camera: 48 MP, f/2.0, 26mm (wide) 8 MP, f/2.2, 123˚ (ultrawide) 5 MP, f/2.2 (depth camera)
- Front camera: 20 MP, f/2.2 (26 mm focal length)
- Display: 6.4" FHD+ Super AMOLED Display (403ppi)
- Connectivity: Wi-Fi 5 Bluetooth v5.0 USB Type-C GPS
- Model: SM-M215F
- Made in: Vietnam, India, Bangladesh
- Website: www.samsung.com/in/smartphones/galaxy-m21-m215f-4gb/SM-M215FZBDINS

Samsung Galaxy M21 is a mid-range Android-based smartphone manufactured, developed and designed by Samsung Electronics as a part of Galaxy M series smartphone lineup for 2020. It was first released on March 18, 2020, as the successor to the Galaxy M20 and Galaxy M30s. It comes preinstalled with Android 10 and Samsung's custom One UI Core 2.0 software overlay, which is now upgraded to Android 12 with One UI Core 4.1.

It has an improved version of itself, the Samsung Galaxy M21s, released on November 6, 2020.

== Specifications ==
=== Hardware ===
The phone features 6.4-inch, FHD+ Super AMOLED panel with rounded corners, screen-to-body ratio of 91% and 19.5:9 aspect ratio. The front glass is constructed of Corning Gorilla Glass 3. There is a rear-mounted fingerprint scanner on the polycarbonate plastic back.

The camera system of the phone is similar to Samsung Galaxy M30s. It comprises 3 rear cameras:

- 48 MP, 1/2.0" main sensor with f/2.0 aperture, 0.8 μm pixel size, 80° field of view
- 8 MP, 1/4.0" ultra-wide lens with f/2.2 aperture, 1.12 μm pixel size,123° field of view
- 5 MP depth sensor with f/2.2 aperture

An infinity-U screen cut-out on the front houses a single 20 MP selfie camera lens with f/2.2 aperture. Rear camera is capable of recording video up to 4K at 30 fps and front camera can record videos up to 1080p at 30 fps

A large 6000 mAh Li-Po battery is charged over adaptive fast charging of 15 watts.

=== Software ===
The phone comes with Android 10 and Samsung's custom One UI Core 2.0 software overlay. The phone received One UI 3.0 update based on Android 11 on January 27, 2021 and One UI 3.1 on March 31, 2021. The phone also features on the list where Samsung smartphones released after 2019 have been committed to receive updates for a minimum of 4 years, however if the committed security updates will translate into next Android version upgrades is yet to be cleared by Samsung.
