= Samsung Galaxy =

Series of Android smartphones, mobile computing device and Android applications

- Logo used since 2015

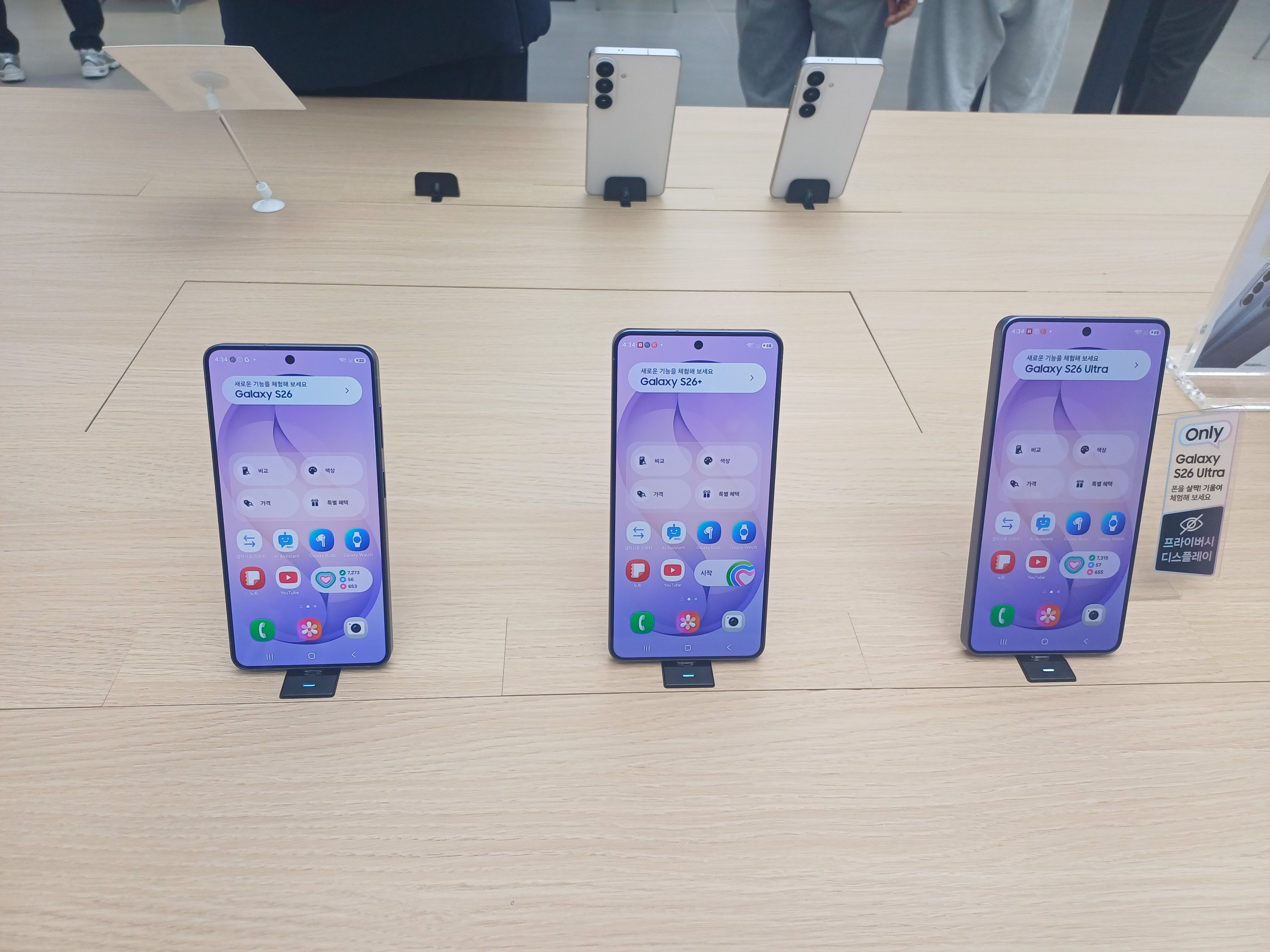
- Samsung Galaxy S26 series, the most recent flagship models of the Samsung Galaxy S series
- Manufacturer: Samsung Electronics
- Type: Smartphone; Tablet; Smartwatch; Earbuds; Laptop; Fitness tracker Mixed-reality headset
- Released: 29 June 2009; 17 years ago
- Units sold: Over 3 billion Galaxy smartphones (as of May 2025)
- Operating system: Android; Tizen; Microsoft Windows; ChromeOS (Chromebook only)
- System on a chip: Samsung Exynos; Qualcomm Snapdragon; MediaTek; UNISOC; Intel Core (for laptops)

Logo used until 2015

Logo used since 2015, without Samsung word

Samsung Galaxy (Korean: 삼성 갤럭시; branded in Japan from 2015 to 2023 only as Galaxy) is a series of mobile computing devices designed, manufactured, and marketed by Samsung Electronics since 2009.

The product line includes the Galaxy S series of high-end smartphones, the Galaxy Z series of foldable smartphones, the Galaxy A, M, and F series of mid-range and budget smartphones, the Galaxy Tab series of tablets, and the Galaxy Watch series of smartwatches. The Galaxy TabPro S is the first Samsung Galaxy-branded Windows 10 device that was announced at CES 2016. In 2020, Samsung added the Galaxy Chromebook 2-in-1 laptop running ChromeOS to the Galaxy branding lineup. The Samsung Galaxy XR, first released on 21 October 2025, is one of the first major extended-reality devices to feature the Android XR operating system.

Samsung Galaxy devices come with a user interface called One UI (with previous versions being known as Samsung Experience and TouchWiz).

The Samsung Galaxy smartphones arguably brought Android into mainstream popularity in the early 2010s.

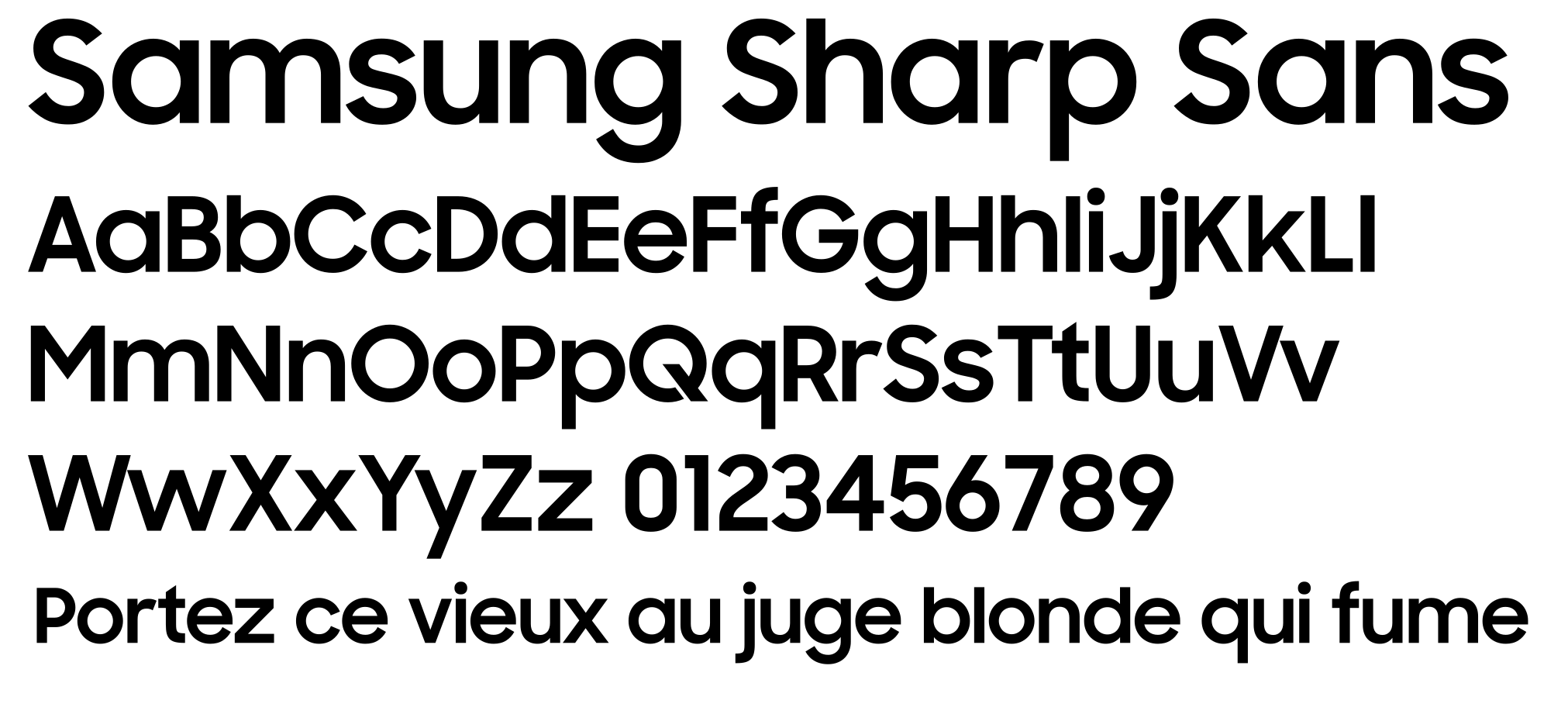
Samsung Sharp Sans, the typeface used for Samsung Galaxy marketing since 2015

== History ==
The Samsung Galaxy was launched in June 2009 as Samsung's first Android powered device. At the time, the brand's flagship smartphone was the Samsung Omnia and its successor, powered by Windows Mobile. Omnia had been the second full-touch Samsung device running the TouchWiz user interface (after the Tocco), but the Galaxy had an unmodified Android interface; the TouchWiz UI made its way to the Galaxy series with the Galaxy S. The Galaxy S and its successor Galaxy S II became very successful, eclipsing the company's other lines and operating systems. During the decade, the Galaxy phones "became the company's most-praised products [and] also were among the best-selling smartphones in the world."

== Products ==
=== Current ===
Series	Description
Smartphones
Galaxy S	Flagship phones also serving as the successors to the cell phones, which from 2006 to 2009 were branded as Samsung Ultra Edition.
Galaxy Z	Flagship foldable phones/devices, debuted in 2019
Galaxy W	Luxury-based foldable devices (based on Galaxy Z series), primarily sold in China, formerly folder phones until SM-W2019
Galaxy XCover	Rugged business phones which have low-end specifications but with stronger build quality and durability, smartphone counterpart of Galaxy Tab Active
Galaxy A	Mid-range phones, also includes entry-level phones, budget phones (formerly premium mid-range phones prior to 2023)
Galaxy M	A slightly more budget-friendly, online-exclusive alternative from the Galaxy A series
Galaxy F	Also a Galaxy A series alternative, but sold in developing countries
Galaxy C	Premium mid-range versions of the Galaxy F series sold in Asian markets. Succeeded by the premium mid-range Galaxy A series devices
Galaxy Buddy	Low-end devices based on the Galaxy A1x series sold only in South Korea by LG U+
Galaxy Wide	Low-end devices based on Galaxy A1x, F1x and M1x series, sold only in South Korea by SK Telecom
Galaxy Jump	Mid-range devices based on the Galaxy M3x and Galaxy A3x series, sold only in South Korea
Galaxy Quantum	Premium mid-range devices based on Galaxy A5x and M5x series, sold only in South Korea by SK Telecom
Tablets
Galaxy Tab S	Mid-range to flagship tablets
Galaxy Tab A	Low-end to mid-range tablets
Galaxy Tab Active	Rugged business-focused tablets
Wearables
Galaxy Watch	Wear OS-based smartwatches, formerly Tizen-based smartwatches until Watch 3
Galaxy Ring	Smart ring for activity tracking
Galaxy Fit	Activity trackers positioned below the Galaxy Watch line
Galaxy Buds	Wireless earbuds, successor to the Gear IconX
Galaxy XR	Extended-reality headsets
Galaxy Glasses	Smart glasses
Laptops
Galaxy Book	Lineup of laptops and 2-in-1 PCs running Windows
Galaxy Chromebook	Lineup of Chromebooks

=== Discontinued ===
Samsung released multiple series of its devices, often overlapping with each other. Some of these series were dropped.

Series	Description	Replacement series
Smartphones
Galaxy Note	Devices with a large screen and a built-in stylus, discontinued in 2021	Galaxy S Ultra series Galaxy Z Fold series
Galaxy Neo	Refreshed versions of older Galaxy models with newer hardware but lower specs compared to the original models, discontinued in 2017	Lite versions of S10 and Note 10, Fan Edition (FE) models
Galaxy S Active	Rugged versions of base-model S series, discontinued in 2018	Galaxy XCover series
Galaxy S Mini	Mid-range versions of base-model S series, discontinued in 2014	Galaxy Alpha and later the Galaxy A series
Galaxy J	Entry-level devices touted as a replacement for the Galaxy Core, Grand, E, Ace, Trend and Y lines; discontinued in 2019	merged with the Galaxy A and M series
Galaxy On	Online-exclusive mid-range phones based on the Galaxy J series, discontinued in 2019	Galaxy M series
Galaxy Grand	Mid-range devices that replaced the Galaxy R family, discontinued in 2016 as original models but continued production as rebranded models of Galaxy J series until 2019	merged with the Galaxy A and M series
Galaxy E	Low-end devices, discontinued in 2016	Galaxy J series
Galaxy Core	Low-end devices, discontinued in 2016	Galaxy J series
Galaxy Trend	Low-end devices, discontinued in 2016	Galaxy J series
Galaxy Ace	Low-end to mid-range devices, discontinued in 2015	Galaxy J series
Galaxy Y	Small low-end devices, discontinued in 2015	Galaxy J series
Galaxy Mega	Large mid-range phablets, discontinued in 2015	Galaxy A series
Galaxy Pocket	Small low-end devices, discontinued in 2015	Galaxy J series
Galaxy Camera	Camera phones, discontinued in 2014	Galaxy S4 Zoom, Galaxy S5 Zoom and Galaxy K Zoom
Galaxy Beam	Phones with built-in projectors, discontinued in 2014	
Galaxy Mini	Small low-end devices, discontinued in 2013	Galaxy Pocket series and Galaxy Y series
Galaxy R	Mid-range devices, discontinued in 2012	Galaxy Grand
Tablets
Galaxy Tab series sold before 2017	Included the original Galaxy Tab Series (Galaxy Tab/Tab 2/Tab 3/Tab 4), Galaxy Tab Education, Galaxy Tab E, Galaxy Note tablets, and Galaxy Tab/Note Pro series.	Galaxy Tab S series (flagship models); Galaxy Tab A series (mid-range and low-end models)
Wearables
Galaxy Gear	Lineup of wearable devices that included headsets, earbuds, smartwatches and activity trackers; Gear-branded earbuds discontinued in 2017 and the rest of the product lineup was discontinued in 2019	Galaxy Watch (smartwatches); Galaxy Buds (earbuds); Galaxy Fit (activity trackers); Galaxy XR (successor to Gear VR)
Galaxy Watch Active	Variants of base model Galaxy Watches that focused more on fitness and wellness	merged with the base models in 2021 starting with the Galaxy Watch 4

==== Other devices ====
===== Phones =====
- Samsung Galaxy [2009]
- Samsung Galaxy Spica [2009]
- Samsung Beam i8520 [2009]
- Samsung Galaxy U [2010]
- Samsung Galaxy Neo [2010]
- Samsung Galaxy Pro [2011]
- Samsung Galaxy Precedent [2011]
- Samsung Galaxy Rush [2011]
- Samsung Galaxy 5 [2011]
- Samsung Galaxy W [2011]
- Samsung Galaxy Fit [2011]
- Samsung Galaxy Gio [2011]
- Samsung Galaxy Prevail [2011]
- Galaxy Nexus [2011]
- Samsung Galaxy Discover [2012]
- Samsung Galaxy M Style [2012]
- Samsung Galaxy Reverb [2012]
- Samsung Galaxy Stellar [2012]
- Samsung Galaxy Appeal [2012]
- Samsung Galaxy Victory [2012]
- Samsung Galaxy Express [2012]
- Samsung Galaxy Express 2 [2013]
- Samsung Galaxy Fame [2013]
- Samsung Galaxy Star [2013]
- Samsung Galaxy Win [2013]
- Samsung Galaxy Win Pro [2013]
- Samsung Galaxy Star Pro [2013]
- Samsung Galaxy Fame Lite [2013]
- Samsung Galaxy Round [2013]
- Samsung Galaxy Light [2013]
- Samsung Galaxy V [2014]
- Samsung Galaxy Avant [2014]
- Samsung Galaxy W (2014) [2014]
- Samsung Galaxy V Plus [2015]
- Samsung Galaxy V2 [2016]
- Samsung Galaxy K Zoom [2014]
- Samsung Galaxy Folder [2015]
- Samsung Galaxy Active Neo [2015]
- Samsung Galaxy Folder 2 [2017]
- Samsung Galaxy Feel [2017]
- Samsung Galaxy Feel 2 [2019]

===== Media player =====
- Samsung Galaxy Player [2010]

===== Cameras =====
- Samsung Galaxy Camera [2012]
- Samsung Galaxy NX [2013]
- Samsung Galaxy Camera 2 [2014]

===== Projectors =====
- Samsung Beam i8520 [2010]
- Samsung Galaxy Beam i8530 [2012]

== Software ==
Samsung Galaxy smartphones run the Android operating system under the Google Mobile Services platform, however Samsung and third-parties have bundled various other software in them too. The TouchWiz interface was used until 2017, replaced by Samsung Experience. This was then replaced by One UI in 2019.

The company has created many apps and services under the Galaxy brand specifically for these devices - many of which come preloaded - including the Galaxy Store which provides apps and customizations. Since late 2019, several Microsoft apps like Outlook also come preloaded on Galaxy as a result of a Samsung-Microsoft partnership.

=== Security ===
Samsung has been reportedly caught quietly installing an Israeli bloatware application known as AppCloud in its budget phones. This app is known for collecting large amounts of sensitive personal data, without a chance to opt-out or uninstall the app without achieving root access due to it falling under the system app umbrella. This process of gaining root access would trip the Samsung Knox E-fuse and void the warranty in the event this is achieved by use of bootloader unlocking, which has recently become impossible on all Samsung devices running One UI 8 or above, as the code for unlocking the bootloader has been completely stripped from not only the settings app, but also the bootloader itself.

=== Interoperability ===
Samsung Flow

Samsung have made several tools for making various Galaxy devices like phones, tablets and watches, work closer together. Samsung Flow is an app allowing content to be synced with a PC, such as notifications, replying to messages and authenticating from a PC, and sharing content. It was announced in November 2014, released in a preview form in May 2015 with the final release in May 2016. Microsoft's Phone Link has been included on Galaxy smartphones since 2019.

Another feature named Multi Control allows Galaxy smartphones to be controlled with a Galaxy Book keyboard and mouse, and drag and drop file sharing between them. Device Control is another feature in the quick panel that can control SmartThings and other devices.

== Release history ==
The following is a table showing the full initial release history of every Galaxy device since 2009.

2026
October	Samsung Galaxy S26 FE							
September	Samsung Galaxy A18	Samsung Galaxy A08						
August	Samsung Galaxy Z Flip 8	Samsung Galaxy Z Fold 8						
May	Samsung Galaxy A27							
April	Samsung Galaxy A57	Samsung Galaxy A37						
March	Samsung Galaxy S26 Ultra	Samsung Galaxy S26+	Samsung Galaxy S26					
January	Samsung Galaxy A07 5G							
2025
December	Samsung Galaxy Z TriFold							
October	Samsung Galaxy M17 5G	Samsung Galaxy M07	Samsung Galaxy F07					
September	Samsung Galaxy A17	Samsung Galaxy F17 5G	Samsung Galaxy Tab S11 Ultra	Samsung Galaxy Tab S11	Samsung Galaxy S25 FE			
August	Samsung Galaxy A07	Samsung Galaxy A17 5G						
July	Samsung Galaxy F36 5G	Samsung Galaxy Z Fold 7	Samsung Galaxy Z Flip 7	Samsung Galaxy Z Flip 7 FE	Samsung Galaxy M36 5G			
May	Samsung Galaxy S25 Edge	Samsung Galaxy F56 5G						
April	Samsung Galaxy M56 5G	Samsung Galaxy Xcover 7 Pro	Samsung Galaxy Tab S10 FE+	Samsung Galaxy Tab S10 FE				
March	Samsung Galaxy F16 5G	Samsung Galaxy A56 5G	Samsung Galaxy A36 5G	Samsung Galaxy A26 5G				
February	Samsung Galaxy M16 5G	Samsung Galaxy M06 5G	Samsung Galaxy A06 5G	Samsung Galaxy F06 5G				
January	Samsung Galaxy S25 Ultra	Samsung Galaxy S25+	Samsung Galaxy S25					
	2024							
November	Samsung Galaxy Z Fold SE							
October	Samsung Galaxy A16	Samsung Galaxy A16 5G						
September	Samsung Galaxy Tab S10 Ultra	Samsung Galaxy Tab S10+	Samsung Galaxy S24 FE	Samsung Galaxy M55s 5G	Samsung Galaxy F05 5G	Samsung Galaxy M05		
August	Samsung Galaxy A06 5G	Samsung Galaxy F14						
July	Samsung Galaxy M35 5G	Samsung Galaxy Z Fold 6	Samsung Galaxy Z Flip 6					
May	Samsung Galaxy M56 5G	Samsung Galaxy F55 5G						
April	Samsung Galaxy C55 5G							
March	Samsung Galaxy M55 5G	Samsung Galaxy A55 5G	Samsung Galaxy A35 5G	Samsung Galaxy M15 5G	Samsung Galaxy M14	Samsung Galaxy F15 5G		
January	Samsung Galaxy S24 Ultra	Samsung Galaxy S24+	Samsung Galaxy S24	Samsung Galaxy Xcover 7				
	2023							
December	Samsung Galaxy A15	Samsung Galaxy A25 5G						
October	Samsung Galaxy Tab S9 FE+	Samsung Galaxy Tab S9 FE	Samsung Galaxy S23 FE	Samsung Galaxy A05				
July	Samsung Galaxy Z Fold 5	Samsung Galaxy Z Flip 5	Samsung Galaxy Tab S9 Ultra	Samsung Galaxy Tab S9+	Samsung Galaxy Tab S9			
May	Samsung Galaxy A24							
March	Samsung Galaxy F14	Samsung Galaxy M54 5G	Samsung Galaxy A54 5G	Samsung Galaxy A34 5G	Samsung Galaxy M14 5G			
February	Samsung Galaxy S23 Ultra	Samsung Galaxy S23+	Samsung Galaxy S23					
January	Samsung Galaxy F04	Samsung Galaxy A14 5G						
	2022							
December	Samsung Galaxy M04							
November	Samsung Galaxy Tab A7 10.4 (2022)	Samsung Galaxy A04e						
October	Samsung Galaxy A04							
September	Samsung Galaxy A04s	Samsung Galaxy Tab Active 4 Pro	Samsung Galaxy A23(5G model)					
August	Samsung Galaxy Z Fold 4	Samsung Galaxy Z Flip 4						
July	Samsung Galaxy Xcover 6 Pro	Samsung Galaxy M13						
June	Samsung Galaxy F13							
April	Samsung Galaxy M53 5G	Samsung Galaxy M23	Samsung Galaxy M33 5G	Samsung Galaxy A33 5G	Samsung Galaxy A73 5G	Samsung Galaxy Tab S8 Ultra	Samsung Galaxy Tab S8+	
March	Samsung Galaxy Tab S8	Samsung Galaxy A53 5G	Samsung Galaxy F23	Samsung Galaxy A23	Samsung Galaxy A13			
February	Samsung Galaxy S22 Ultra	Samsung Galaxy S22+	Samsung Galaxy S22					
January	Samsung Galaxy S21 FE							
	2021							
December	Samsung Galaxy A13 5G	Samsung Galaxy Tab A8 10.5						
November	Samsung Galaxy A03	Samsung Galaxy A03 Core						
September	Samsung Galaxy F42 5G	Samsung Galaxy M52 5G	Samsung Galaxy M22					
August	Samsung Galaxy M32 5G	Samsung Galaxy A03s	Samsung Galaxy A52s 5G	Samsung Galaxy Z Fold3 5G	Samsung Galaxy Z Flip3 5G			
July	Samsung Galaxy F22							
June	Samsung Galaxy M32	Samsung Galaxy A22 5G	Samsung Galaxy A22					
May	Samsung Galaxy Tab S7 FE	Samsung Galaxy Tab A7 Lite	Samsung Galaxy F52 5G					
April	Samsung Galaxy M42 5G	Samsung Galaxy F02s	Samsung Galaxy F12					
March	Samsung Galaxy A72	Samsung Galaxy A52 5G	Samsung Galaxy A52	Samsung Galaxy A32	Samsung Galaxy M62			
February	Samsung Galaxy F62	Samsung Galaxy M12	Samsung Galaxy M02					
January	Samsung Galaxy A02	Samsung Galaxy S21	Samsung Galaxy S21+	Samsung Galaxy S21 Ultra	Samsung Galaxy A32 5G	Samsung Galaxy M02s		
	2020							
November	Samsung Galaxy A02s	Samsung Galaxy A12	Samsung Galaxy M21s	Samsung Galaxy A42 5G				
October	Samsung Galaxy F41	Samsung Galaxy S20 FE						
September	Samsung Galaxy Z Fold2 5G	Samsung Galaxy M51						
August	Samsung Galaxy Note 20	Samsung Galaxy Note 20 Ultra	Samsung Galaxy Z Flip 5G	Samsung Galaxy Tab S7	Samsung Galaxy Tab S7+	Samsung Galaxy M31s		
July	Samsung Galaxy A01 Core	Samsung Galaxy M01s						
June	Samsung Galaxy M01							
May	Samsung Galaxy A21s							
April	Samsung Galaxy A71 5G	Samsung Galaxy A51 5G	Samsung Galaxy A21	Samsung Galaxy Tab S6 Lite				
March	Samsung Galaxy S20	Samsung Galaxy S20+	Samsung Galaxy S20 Ultra	Samsung Galaxy M11	Samsung Galaxy A31	Samsung Galaxy A41	Samsung Galaxy M21	Samsung Galaxy A11
February	Samsung Galaxy M31	Samsung Galaxy Z Flip						
January	Samsung Galaxy Tab S6 5G	Samsung Galaxy Xcover Pro	Samsung Galaxy Note 10 Lite	Samsung Galaxy S10 Lite				
	2019							
December	Samsung Galaxy A01	Samsung Galaxy A71	Samsung Galaxy A51					
October	Samsung Galaxy M30s	Samsung Galaxy A20s						
September	Samsung Galaxy M10s	Samsung Galaxy A70s	Samsung Galaxy A50s	Samsung Galaxy A30s	Samsung Galaxy A90 5G	Samsung Galaxy Fold		
August	Samsung Galaxy A10s	Samsung Galaxy A10e	Samsung Galaxy Note 10	Samsung Galaxy Note 10+				
June	Samsung Galaxy M40							
April	Samsung Galaxy View 2	Samsung Galaxy A60	Samsung Galaxy A80	Samsung Galaxy A70	Samsung Galaxy A40	Samsung Galaxy A20	Samsung Galaxy A20e	Samsung Galaxy A2 Core
March	Samsung Galaxy S10 5G	Samsung Galaxy S10+	Samsung Galaxy S10	Samsung Galaxy S10e	Samsung Galaxy A50	Samsung Galaxy A30		
February	Samsung Galaxy Tab S5e	Samsung Galaxy Tab A 10.1 (2019)	Samsung Galaxy M30					
January	Samsung Galaxy M10	Samsung Galaxy M20						
	2018							
December	Samsung Galaxy A8s							
November	Samsung Galaxy A6s							
October	Samsung Galaxy A9 (2018)							
September	Samsung Galaxy A7 (2018)	Samsung Galaxy J4+	Samsung Galaxy J6+					
August	Samsung Galaxy Note 9	Samsung Galaxy Tab A 10.5 (2018)	Samsung Galaxy Tab S4	Samsung Galaxy Watch				
July	Samsung Galaxy J8 (2018)	Samsung Galaxy On6						
June	Samsung Galaxy A8 Star	Samsung Galaxy J7 (2018)						
May	Samsung Galaxy A6 (2018)	Samsung Galaxy A6+ (2018)	Samsung Galaxy J4 (2018)	Samsung Galaxy J6 (2018)				
April	Samsung Galaxy J3 Duo							
March	Samsung Galaxy J4 Prime 2	Samsung Galaxy J7 (2018)						
February	Samsung Galaxy S9	Samsung Galaxy S9+						
January	Samsung Galaxy J4 Pro (2018)	Samsung Galaxy A5 (2018)	Samsung Galaxy A5+ (2018)	Samsung Galaxy A8 (2018)	Samsung Galaxy A8+ (2018)			
	2017							
October	Samsung Galaxy J4 (2017)	Samsung Galaxy Tab Active						
September	Samsung Galaxy Tab An 8.0 (2017)	Samsung Galaxy C8 / C7 (2017); Samsung Galaxy J7+						
August	Samsung Galaxy Note 8	Samsung Galaxy S8 Active						
July	Samsung Galaxy Note Fan Edition (FE)							
June	Samsung Galaxy J3 (2017)	Samsung Galaxy J5 (2017)	Samsung Galaxy J7 (2017)	Samsung Galaxy J7 Pro (2017)	Samsung Galaxy J7 Max			
April	Samsung Galaxy Xcover 4							
March	Samsung Galaxy S8	Samsung Galaxy S8+	Samsung Galaxy C5 Pro					
February	Samsung Galaxy Tab S3							
January	Samsung Galaxy A7 (2017)	Samsung Galaxy A5 (2017)	Samsung Galaxy A3 (2017)	Samsung Galaxy C7 Pro				
	2016							
November	Samsung Galaxy J1 mini Prime/Galaxy V2 (Indonesia)	Samsung Galaxy J2 Prime	Samsung Galaxy C9 Pro					
September	Samsung Galaxy A8 (2016)	Samsung Galaxy On5 (2016)	Samsung Galaxy On5 (2016)	Samsung Galaxy On7 (2016)	Samsung Galaxy J7 Prime			
August	Samsung Galaxy Note 7							
July	Samsung Galaxy J5 Prime							
June	Samsung Galaxy S7 Active	Samsung Galaxy J3 Pro						
May	Samsung Galaxy Tab A 10.1 (2016)	Samsung Galaxy C5	Samsung Galaxy C7					
April	Samsung Galaxy J5 (2016)	Samsung Galaxy J7 (2016)						
March	Samsung Galaxy J3 (2016)	Samsung Galaxy Tab A6	Samsung Galaxy A9 Pro (2016)					
February	Samsung Galaxy J1 Mini	Samsung Galaxy S7 Edge	Samsung Galaxy S7					
January	Samsung Galaxy J1 (2016)	Samsung Galaxy TabPro S	Samsung Galaxy A9 (2016)					
	2015							
December	Samsung Galaxy A7 (2016)	Samsung Galaxy A5 (2016)	Samsung Galaxy A3 (2016)					
November	Samsung Galaxy View	Samsung Galaxy On3						
October	Samsung Galaxy J1 Ace	Samsung Galaxy Active Neo	Samsung Galaxy On2	Samsung Z3				
September	Samsung Galaxy J2							
August	Samsung Galaxy S6 Edge+	Samsung Galaxy A8	Samsung Galaxy Note 5	Samsung Galaxy S5 Neo				
July	Samsung Galaxy Trend 2 Lite	Samsung Galaxy V Plus						
June	Samsung Galaxy S6 Active	Samsung Galaxy J5	Samsung Galaxy J7					
April	Samsung Galaxy S6 Edge	Samsung Galaxy S6	Samsung Galaxy Xcover 3					
February	Samsung Galaxy J1	Samsung Galaxy E5	Samsung Galaxy A7	Samsung Galaxy E7				
January	Samsung Z1							
	2014							
December	Samsung Galaxy A5 (2015)	Samsung Galaxy A3 (2015)						
November	Samsung Galaxy Core Prime							
October	Samsung Galaxy Note Edge	Samsung Galaxy Note 4	Samsung Galaxy Young 2					
September	Samsung Galaxy Alpha	Samsung Galaxy Grand Prime	Samsung Galaxy Core Prime	Samsung Galaxy Pocket 2	Samsung Galaxy Mega 2			
August	Samsung Galaxy Star 2 Plus	Samsung Galaxy Ace 4	Samsung Galaxy S Duos 3					
July	Samsung Galaxy Core 2	Samsung Galaxy S5 Mini	Samsung Galaxy Tab S 10.5					
June	Samsung Galaxy Core							
May	Samsung Galaxy K Zoom	Samsung Galaxy Ace Style						
April	Samsung Galaxy S5	Samsung Galaxy S3 Neo						
March	Samsung Galaxy Win 2							
January	Samsung Galaxy Note 3 Neo	Samsung Galaxy Grand Neo	Samsung Galaxy Grand Lite					
	2013							
December	Samsung Galaxy Win Pro	Samsung Galaxy J	Samsung Galaxy S Duos 2	Samsung Galaxy Trend Plus				
November	Samsung Galaxy Grand 2							
October	Samsung Galaxy Star Pro	Samsung Galaxy J	Samsung Galaxy Express 2	Samsung Galaxy Round	Samsung Galaxy Trend Lite	Samsung Galaxy Fame Lite	Samsung Galaxy Light	Samsung Galaxy Core Plus
September	Samsung Galaxy Note 3	Samsung Galaxy Gear						
July	Samsung Galaxy S4 Mini							
June	Samsung Galaxy S4 Active	Samsung Galaxy S4 Zoom	Samsung Galaxy Ace 3	Samsung Galaxy Pocket Neo				
May	Samsung Galaxy Star	Samsung Galaxy Core	Samsung Galaxy Y Plus	Samsung Galaxy Win/Galaxy Grand Quattro				
April	Samsung Galaxy Mega	Samsung Galaxy Fame	Samsung Galaxy S4					
March	Samsung Galaxy Xcover 2	Samsung Galaxy Young						
January	Samsung Galaxy Grand	Samsung Galaxy S II Plus	Samsung Galaxy Pocket Plus					
	2012							
November	Samsung Galaxy Discover/Samsung Galaxy Discover TracFone/Samsung Galaxy Centura	Samsung Galaxy S III Mini						
October	Samsung Galaxy Rugby Pro/Samsung Galaxy Rugby LTE (Canadian market)	Samsung Galaxy Express						
September	Samsung Galaxy Rush	Samsung Galaxy S Relay 4G	Samsung Galaxy Note II	Samsung Galaxy Reverb	Samsung Galaxy Victory 4G LTE	Samsung Galaxy Pocket Duos		
August	Samsung Galaxy S Duos/Galaxy Trend/Galaxy Trend II Duos							
July	Samsung Galaxy Stellar							
May	Samsung Galaxy Ch@t	Samsung Galaxy Appeal	Samsung Galaxy S III					
April	Samsung Galaxy S Advance/Galaxy S II Lite	Samsung Galaxy Rugby						
March	Samsung Galaxy Pocket	Samsung Galaxy Rugby Smart						
February	Samsung Galaxy Beam i8530	Samsung Galaxy Y DUOS	Samsung Galaxy Mini 2	Samsung Galaxy Ace 2/Samsung Galaxy Ace 2 x				
January	Samsung Galaxy Ace Plus	Samsung Galaxy Y Pro DUOS						
	2011							
November	Samsung Galaxy Nexus							
October	Samsung Galaxy Note	Samsung Stratosphere						
August	Samsung Galaxy Xcover	Samsung Galaxy Precedent	Samsung Galaxy Y	Samsung Galaxy M	Samsung Galaxy W/Samsung Exhibit II 4G	Samsung Galaxy R	Samsung Galaxy S Plus	
June	Samsung Galaxy Z	Samsung Exhibit 4G						
May	Samsung Galaxy S II/Samsung Captivate Glide							
April	Samsung Galaxy Neo	Samsung Galaxy Pro	Samsung Galaxy Prevail					
March	Samsung Galaxy Mini/Samsung Galaxy Next (Italy)/Samsung Galaxy Pop (India)	Samsung Galaxy Gio						
February	Samsung Galaxy SL	Samsung Galaxy Fit	Samsung Galaxy Ace/Samsung Galaxy Cooper (Thailand)					
	2010							
October	Samsung Galaxy 551							
August	Samsung Galaxy U	Samsung Galaxy 5/Samsung Galaxy Europa/Samsung Galaxy 550						
July	Samsung Galaxy 3/Samsung Galaxy Apollo							
May	Samsung Galaxy S/Samsung Captivate/Samsung Vibrant/Samsung Fascinate/Samsung Epic 4G/Samsung Mesmerize							
	2009							
November	Samsung Galaxy Spica/Samsung Galaxy Portal							
June	Samsung Galaxy							

== Regional firmware variants ==
=== Region locking and CSC codes ===
Starting from the Galaxy Note 3, Samsung phones and tablets contained a warning label stating that it would only operate with SIM cards from the region the phone was sold in. A spokesperson clarified the policy, stating that it was intended to prevent grey-market reselling, and that it only applied to the first SIM card inserted. For devices to use a SIM card from other regions, one of the following actions totaling five minutes or longer in length must first be performed with the SIM card from the local region:

- Make calls on the phone or watch from the Samsung Phone app
- Use the Call and Text on Other Devices feature to make calls

With the launch of the Galaxy S8 series in 2017, that process has changed. Due to the fact that many variants use a Multi-CSC, it will only work with SIM cards from the same CSC group. For example, an AT&T SIM card will not work on cellular-based Galaxy devices sold in Europe and other countries.

=== Model numbers ===
Since September 2013, model numbers of devices in the Samsung Galaxy series are in the "SM-ABCDE" format (excluding the Galaxy J SC-02F, Galaxy Centura SCH-S738C, and SGH-N075T), where A is the model series, B is the device class, C is the generation, D is the device type, and E is the country/region that it is made for (if applicable). Prior to September 2013, the model numbers were in the "GT-XXXXX" format; they were also in the "SCH-XXXX", "SGH-XXXX", "SPH-XXXX" and "SHV/SHW-XXXX" formats.

==== Model Series (A) ====
===== Current =====
Model series	Assigned devices
Phones
SM-Sxxx	Galaxy S series models since S22
SM-Fxxx	Galaxy Z series models
SM-Gxxx	Galaxy Xcover series models
SM-Axxx	Galaxy A series models
SM-Mxxx	Galaxy M series models
SM-Exxx	Galaxy F series models
SM-Wxxxx	W series models
Tablets
SM-Xxxx	Galaxy Tab A series models since Tab A8; Galaxy Tab S series models since Tab S8 series Galaxy Tab Active series models since Tab Active 5
Wearables
SM-Rxxx	Galaxy Fit and Galaxy Buds series models
SM-Lxxx	Galaxy Watch series models since Watch 7

===== Former =====
Model series	Assigned devices
Phones
SM-Sxxx	devices sold from TracFone
SM-Fxxx	older F series models
SM-Gxxx	Galaxy S series devices (U.S. and Canada Galaxy S3 mini models, then from S5 to S21); Ace, Grand, Round, Core, Trend, Alpha, Wide, Mega 2, Pocket 2, Star 2, Young 2, On models some J series Prime model or A8/A9 Star
SM-Nxxx	Galaxy Note series models
SM-Jxxx	Galaxy J series models
SM-Exxx	Galaxy E series models
GT-Sxxx2; SM-Gxxx2; SM-Gxxx/DS; SM-Gxxx/DD	Dual-SIM "Galaxy Duos" model
GT-Nxxx0; GT-Nxxx5	Galaxy Note 1 and 2 (International 3G/4G, respectively)
GT-Ixxx0; GT-Ixxx5	Galaxy S4 and earlier models (International 3G/4G LTE, respectively)
GT-Ixxx3	Unlocked Galaxy S4 and earlier models (US/Canada)
SGH	GSM handset for US
SPH	Sprint handset
SCH	Verizon/US Cellular handset
SHV/SHW	Korean handset
Tablets
SM-Txx0/1/5/6	Tab 3 to Tab A7 Lite, Tab Active 4, Tab S7 series
SM-Pxx0/5	mainstream Tab models with built-in S Pen stylus (Note 10.1 2014, Tab A 10.1, etc.)
SM-Wxxx	Microsoft Windows model (i.e., Galaxy Book)
GT-Nxx00; GT-Pxx20	older mainstream Tab models with built-in S Pen stylus (Note 8.0 and 10.1, 3G/4G LTE respectively)
GT-Nxx10	older mainstream Tab models with built-in S Pen stylus (Note 8.0 and 10.1, Wi-Fi)
GT-Pxx00; GT-Pxx20	older mainstream Tab models (Tab 1 to Tab 3, 3G/4G LTE respectively)
GT-Pxx13	older mainstream Tab models (Tab 1 to Tab 3, US/Canada Wi-Fi)
GT-Pxx10	older mainstream Tab models (Tab 1 to Tab 3, International Wi-Fi)
GT-Sxxx5; GT-Nxxx5; GT-Pxxx5; GT-Ixxx5; SM-NxxxF; SM-Txx5; SM-GxxxF	4G/LTE models
Wearables
SM-Rxxx	Galaxy Watch series models to Watch FE

==== Regions (E) ====
Assigned regions (Reference:)
Letter/Number	Market/Region
Unlocked variants
B	International 5G
C	China mainland (tablets)
E	Asia
F	International LTE
H	International 3G (no longer in use)
M	Latin America
N	South Korea
Q	Japan (factory unlocked variant)
W	Canada
U1	USA (factory unlocked variant)
X	Live demo unit
0	China mainland (phones)
Note: Dual SIM models end with the /DS suffix
Carrier-locked variants
A	AT&T
AZ	Cricket
C	Rakuten Mobile (Japan)
D	NTT Docomo
J	au by KDDI
K	KT
L	LG Uplus
P	Sprint, Boost Mobile, Virgin Mobile
R4	UScellular
S	SK Telecom
T	T-Mobile
T1	Metro by T-Mobile (formerly MetroPCS)
U	USA carrier locked
V	Verizon
Z	SoftBank Mobile

=== Firmware numbering ===
The following is a list of known firmware regions.

Region	Code	Description
Korea	KS	Korea (phones)
Korea	KO	Korea (cellular tablets)
Korea	XX	All Wi-Fi tablets
India	IN	India (all phones)
Americas	SQ	USA (carrier locked phones)
Americas	UE	USA (carrier unlocked phones and Wi-Fi tablets), Canada (Wi-Fi tablets)
Americas	VL	Canada (all variants except Wi-Fi tablets)
Americas	UB	Latin America & Caribbean
Americas	XX	All Wi-Fi tablets
China	ZC	China mainland (all devices)
China	ZH	Hong Kong/Taiwan (all phones)
China	XX	Hong Kong/Taiwan (all tablets)

== Over the Horizon ==
"Over the Horizon" is the trademark sound for Samsung smartphone devices, first introduced in 2011 on the Galaxy S II. It was composed by Joong-sam Yun and appears as music in the music library of most Samsung phones released since 2011. Prior to 2011, "Beyond Samsung" served as Samsung's trademark music track, while "Samsung Tune" was used as the default ringtone. The sound appears as the default ringtone, as well as the sound when the phone turns on or off (a snippet is used), and as a notification sound. While the basic composition of the six-note tune has not changed since its inception, various versions of different genres have been introduced as the product line evolved.

While the first two versions were created in-house at Samsung, later versions were outsourced to external musicians. The sound has been covered by various popular artists who have released their own arrangements and remixes of the song, such as Quincy Jones, Icona Pop, Suga of BTS, and various K-pop artists. In Samsung's U.S. registration of the trademark for the sound, it is described as "the sound of a bell playing a B4 dotted eighth note, a B4 sixteenth note, an F#5 sixteenth note, a B5 sixteenth note, an A#5 eighth note, and an F#5 half note".

Year	Device introduced	Genre	Artist(s)
2011	Samsung Galaxy S II	Rock	In-house
2012	Samsung Galaxy S III	New-age	In-house
2013	Samsung Galaxy S4	Symphonic rock	Jamie Christopherson
2013	Samsung Galaxy S5	Symphonic rock	Jamie Christopherson
2015	Samsung Galaxy S6	Orchestral pop	Jamie Christopherson, Al Schmitt, Nashville String Machine
2016	Samsung Galaxy S7	Jazz fusion	Dirty Loops
2017	Samsung Galaxy S8	Crossover, Contemporary jazz	Jacob Collier
2018	Samsung Galaxy S9	Orchestra, New-age	Pétur Jónsson
2019	Samsung Galaxy S10	Classical crossover, Contemporary classical	Steven Price, London Philharmonic Orchestra
2020	Samsung Galaxy S20	"Cinematic" new-age	Jamie Christopherson
2021	Samsung Galaxy S21	Neoclassical new-age	Yiruma
2022	Samsung Galaxy S22	Jazztronica	Kiefer Shackelford
2023	Samsung Galaxy S23	Electronic	Yaeji
2024	Samsung Galaxy S24	Gugak	Won Il
2025	Samsung Galaxy S25	Big band	Jacob Mann, Will Kennedy
2026	Samsung Galaxy S26	Orchestra	Royal Philharmonic Orchestra, Eunike Tanzil

== See also ==
- Comparison of Samsung Galaxy S smartphones
- Samsung W series
- Lists of mobile computers
