= Samsung Galaxy M30 =

Mid-range Android phone from Samsung

Samsung Galaxy M30 Samsung Galaxy A40s (China)
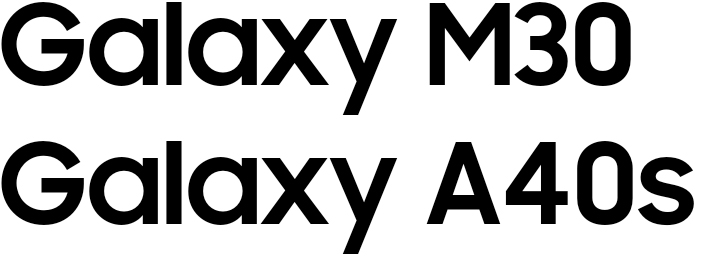
- Brand: Samsung Galaxy
- Manufacturer: Samsung Electronics
- Type: Smartphone
- Series: Galaxy M Galaxy A
- First released: March 2019; 7 years ago
- Successor: Galaxy M31; Galaxy A41
- Related: Galaxy M10; Galaxy M20; Galaxy M30s; Galaxy M40
- Compatible networks: 2G; 3G; LTE
- Form factor: Slate
- Dimensions: 159 mm × 75.1 mm × 8.4 mm (6.26 in × 2.96 in × 0.33 in)
- Weight: 175 g (6.2 oz)
- Operating system: Original: Android 8.1 "Oreo" with Samsung Experience 9.5, Android Pie with One UI 1.1 (Southeast Asia) Current: Android 11 with One UI 3.1
- System-on-chip: Samsung Exynos 7904 Octa 14nm
- CPU: Octa-core 1.6 GHz Cortex-A53
- GPU: Mali-G71 MP2
- Memory: 3/4/6 GB RAM
- Storage: 32/64/128 GB eMMC 5.1
- Removable storage: microSD, expandable up to 512 GB
- SIM: Dual nanoSIM, DSDS
- Battery: 5000 mAh (non-removable) Li-ion
- Charging: 15W Samsung Fast Charging
- Rear camera: Triple: 13 MP, f/1.9, PDAF, 1080p at 30 fps; 5 MP, f/2.2, depth sensor; 5 MP, 12mm, ultra wide sensor
- Front camera: 16 MP, f/2.0, 1080p at 30 fps
- Display: 1080×2340 1080p Super AMOLED capacitive touchscreen, 16M colors; 6.4 in (160 mm), 394 ppi)
- Sound: 3.5mm audio jack, Dolby Atmos, vibration, Noise Cancellation Microphone
- Connectivity: Wi-Fi 802.11 a/b/g/n/ac, dual-band, Wi-Fi Direct, Bluetooth 5.0, GPS, GLONASS, USB Type-C 2.0
- Model: SM-M305x, SM-A305x
- Development status: Discontinued

The Samsung Galaxy M30, also known as Samsung Galaxy A40s in China, is an Android-based phablet produced by Samsung Electronics. It was unveiled on 27 February 2019. The phone comes with Android 8 (Oreo) with Samsung's proprietary One UI skin, 32, 64 or 128 GB of internal storage, and a 5000 mAh Li-Po battery.

== Availability ==
The M30 is aimed primarily at the Indian market where the base model retails for 9,999 rupees. It is sold exclusively on Amazon.in and Samsung's official online retail store. In China and Taiwan, it is sold as the Samsung Galaxy A40s.

== Specifications ==
=== Software ===
The Galaxy M30 runs on Android Oreo, now upgradable to Android 10.

=== Hardware ===
The Galaxy M30 has a 6.4-inch FHD+ Super AMOLED display. It is powered by Exynos 7904 SoC with a 14 nm octa-core CPU and Mali-G71 GPU, and has a 5000 mAh battery with fast charging. It comes with 3 GB RAM and 32 GB ROM, 4 GB RAM and 64 GB ROM or 6 GB RAM and 128 GB ROM. Storage is expandable via a dedicated microSD card slot up to 512 GB.

It has a triple camera system that includes a 13-megapixel main sensor, a 5-megapixel depth sensor and a 5-megapixel ultra-wide sensor. It includes a 16-megapixel front camera.

The phone has a fingerprint scanner, 4G, VoLTE, WiFi, Bluetooth 5 and GPS. It comes with a USB Type-C port.

The phone comes with Widevine L1 Certification, allowing it to stream HD content from different video streaming websites. It also supports Dolby ATMOS 360° surround sound. The Samsung Galaxy M30s comes with a 6.4” FHD+ (1080×2340) Super AMOLED Infinity-U Display with a U-shaped notch for the frontal camera, similar to the Samsung Galaxy M30s. This results in a screen-to-body ratio of 90%. The display has a contrast ratio of 78960:1 and a max brightness of 420 nits. The phone has a 5000 mAh Li-Po battery supporting wired 15 W fast charging.
