= Samsung Galaxy M series =

Series of Android smartphones in 2019 by Samsung Electronics

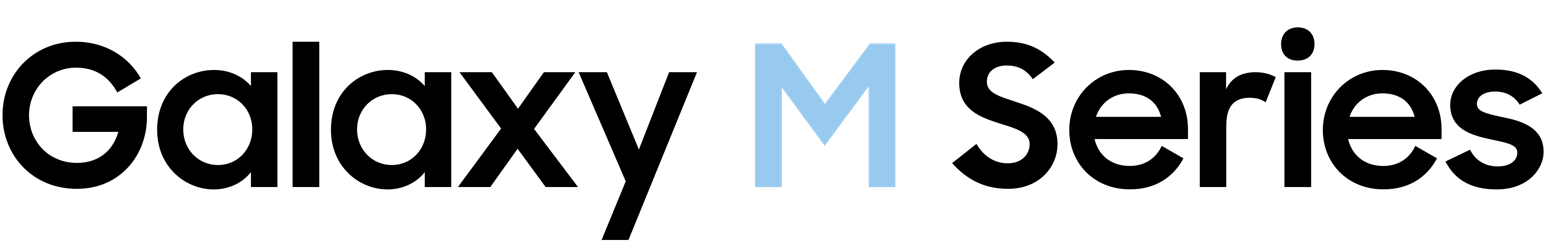
- Developer: Samsung Electronics
- Product family: Samsung Galaxy
- Type: Smartphones
- Released: 5 February 2019; 7 years ago
- Operating system: Android
- System on a chip: Samsung Exynos (2019–present); Qualcomm Snapdragon (2019–present); MediaTek (2020–present)
- Predecessor: Samsung Galaxy J series (2015–2019); Samsung Galaxy On series (2015–2018)
- Related: Samsung Galaxy A series Samsung Galaxy F series

Galaxy M series release timeline
2019	Galaxy Mx0
2020	Galaxy Mx1
2021	Galaxy Mx2
2022	Galaxy Mx3
2023	Galaxy Mx4
2024	Galaxy Mx5
2025	Galaxy Mx6
2026	Galaxy Mx7

The Samsung Galaxy M series is a line of primarily online entry-level and mid-range budget smartphones manufactured and developed by Samsung Electronics, marketed primarily for India and other emerging markets. The first models in the series, the Samsung Galaxy M10 and M20, were released on 5 February 2019; they were followed by the Samsung Galaxy M30 on 7 March and the Samsung Galaxy M40 on 18 June. The Samsung Galaxy M10s and Samsung Galaxy M30s were announced on 18 September, and both were released on 29 September. The Galaxy M01 and M11 were released on 2 June 2020 and were available for sale on both online and offline platforms. On 10 September, Samsung announced the Galaxy M51, the first upper mid-range model in the lineup.

The primary selling point of the lineup is the higher-capacity battery, following the common trend within budget smartphones in the late-2010s. It is positioned below the Galaxy A series, although several models were derived from the Galaxy A series with several alterations.

Exclusively for the Indian market, Samsung also released a rebranded variant of the Galaxy M series, known as the Galaxy F series, in collaboration with Flipkart; the Galaxy M series is still sold in India by other retailers.

== Description ==
Being positioned at the mid-range and low-end segments, all models in the series have all the essential features of an entry-level smartphone, besides some other advanced features, thus differentiating them from other series and also differ in size and design. Samsung targets Asian developing markets or the European entry-level market with the lineup as a response to the growing popularity of smartphones offered by Chinese manufacturers such as Xiaomi, realme and infinix.

== Phones ==
=== Galaxy Mx0 (1st generation) ===
Legend:	Unsupported	Security only	Supported	Upcoming

Model		M10	M10s	M20	M30	M30s	M40
Support status		Unsupported					
Dates	Announced	January 2019	September 2019	28 January 2019	27 February 2019	18 September 2019	June 2019
Dates	Released	February 2019	September 2019	February 2019	March 2019	30 October 2019	June 2019
OS	Initial	Samsung Experience 9.5; Android 8				One UI 1.1; Android 9	
OS	Latest	One UI 2 Android 10				One UI 3.1; Android 11	
Dimensions mm (in)	Height	155.6 (6.13)	158.4 (6.24)	156.4 (6.16)	159 (6.3)		155.3 (6.11)
Dimensions mm (in)	Width	75.6 (2.98)	74.7 (2.94)	74.5 (2.93)	75.1 (2.96)		73.9 (2.91)
Dimensions mm (in)	Depth	7.7 (0.30)	7.8 (0.31)	8.8 (0.35)	8.5 (0.33)	8.9 (0.35)	7.9 (0.31)
Weight g (lb)		163 (0.359)	169 (0.373)	186 (0.410)	174 (0.384)	188 (0.414)	168 (0.370)
Colors							
Display	Size	6.22 in (158 mm)	6.4 in (160 mm)	6.3 in (160 mm)	6.4 in (160 mm)		6.3 in (160 mm)
Display	Resolution	720 x 1520	720 x 1560	1080 x 2340			
Display	Refresh Rate	60 Hz					
Display	Type	PLS LCD	Super AMOLED	PLS LCD	Super AMOLED		PLS LCD
Display	Camera cutout	Infinity-V			Infinity-U		Infinity-O
Front camera		5 MP	8 MP		16 MP		
Rear cameras	Wide	13 MP				48 MP	32 MP
Rear cameras	Ultrawide	5 MP				8 MP	
Rear cameras	Depth	—N/a			5 MP		
RAM		2 GB; 3 GB	3 GB	3 GB; 4 GB	3 GB; 4 GB; 6 GB	4 GB; 6 GB	
Storage		16 GB; 32 GB	32 GB	32 GB; 64 GB	32 GB; 64 GB; 128 GB	64 GB; 128 GB	
Processor		Samsung; Exynos 7870 Octa	Samsung; Exynos 7884B	Samsung; Exynos 7904		Samsung; Exynos 9611	Qualcomm; Snapdragon 675
Connectivity	Cellular	LTE					
Connectivity	Wi-Fi	Wi-Fi 4			Wi-Fi 5		
Connectivity	Bluetooth	4.2	5.0				
Connectivity	Positioning	GPS, GLONASS, BDS					Adds; GALILEO
Connectivity	MicroSD	Yes					SIM slot
Connectivity	3.5mm jack	Yes					No
Connectivity	USB	microUSB 2.0	USB C 2.0				
Connectivity	NFC	No		Market	No	Market	Yes
Battery	Capacity (mAh)	3400	4000	5000		6000	3500
Battery	Replaceable	No					
Battery	Fast Charging	No	15 W				
IP rating		No					

=== Galaxy Mx1 (2nd generation) ===
Model	Announced Date	Display	Operating System	Processor	Memory	Rear Camera	Front Camera	Fingerprint Sensor	Battery	Fast Charging
Samsung Galaxy M01	02 June 2020	5.7" HD+ PLS TFT Infinity-V Display (720 x 1520 pixels)	Android 12; One UI 4.1	Qualcomm Snapdragon 439	32 GB flash / 3 GB RAM	13 MP (Wide) 2 MP (Depth)	5 MP	No	4,000 mAh	15W Adaptive Fast Charging
Samsung Galaxy M01s	16 July 2020	6.2" HD+ PLS TFT Infinity-V Display (720 x 1520 pixels)	Android 12; One UI 4.1	MediaTek Helio P22	32 GB flash / 3 GB RAM	13 MP (Wide) 2 MP (Depth)	5 MP	Rear	4,000 mAh	15W Adaptive Fast Charging
Samsung Galaxy M11	30 March 2020	6.4" HD+ PLS TFT Infinity-O Display (720 x 1560 pixels)	Android 12; One UI 4.1	Qualcomm Snapdragon 450	32 or 64 GB flash / 3 or 4 GB RAM	13 MP (Wide) 5 MP (Ultrawide) 2 MP (Depth)	8 MP	Rear	5,000 mAh	15W Adaptive Fast Charging
Samsung Galaxy M21	18 March 2020	6.4" FHD+ Super AMOLED Infinity-U Display (1080 × 2340 pixels)	Android 12; One UI 4.1	Samsung Exynos 9611 Octa	64 or 128 GB flash / 4 or 6 GB RAM	48 MP (Wide) 8 MP (Ultrawide) 5 MP (Depth)	20 MP	Rear	6,000 mAh	15W Adaptive Fast Charging
Samsung Galaxy M21s	06 November 2020	6.4" FHD+ Super AMOLED Infinity-U Display (1080 × 2340 pixels)	Android 12; One UI 4.1	Samsung Exynos 9611 Octa	64 or 128 GB flash / 4 or 6 GB RAM	64 MP (Wide) 8 MP (Ultrawide) 5 MP (Depth)	32 MP	Rear	6,000 mAh	15W Adaptive Fast Charging
Samsung Galaxy M31	25 February 2020	6.4" FHD+ Super AMOLED Infinity-U Display (1080 × 2340 pixels)	Android 12; One UI 4.1	Samsung Exynos 9611 Octa	64 or 128 GB flash / 6 or 8 GB RAM (128 GB flash / 6 GB RAM, prime only)	64 MP (Wide) 8 MP (Ultrawide) 2x 5 MP (Macro/Depth)	32 MP	Rear	6,000 mAh	15W Adaptive Fast Charging
Samsung Galaxy M31s	30 July 2020	6.5" FHD+ Super AMOLED Infinity-O Display (1080 × 2400 pixels)	Android 12; One UI 4.1	Samsung Exynos 9611 Octa	128 GB flash / 6 or 8 GB RAM	64 MP (Wide) 12 MP (Ultrawide) 2x 5 MP (Macro/Depth)	32 MP	Side	6,000 mAh	25W Adaptive Fast Charging
Samsung Galaxy M51	31 August 2020	6.7" FHD+ Super AMOLED Plus Infinity-O Display (1080 × 2400 pixels)	Android 12; One UI 4.1	Qualcomm Snapdragon 730G	128 GB flash / 6 or 8 GB RAM	64 MP (Wide) 12 MP (Ultrawide) 2x 5 MP (Macro/Depth)	32 MP	Side	7,000 mAh	25W Adaptive Fast Charging

=== Galaxy Mx2 (3rd generation) ===
Model	Display	Operating System	Processor	Memory	Storage	Rear Camera	Front Camera	Fingerprint Sensor	Battery	Fast Charging
Galaxy M02	6.5" HD+ PLS IPS Infinity-V Display (720 x 1600 pixels)	Android 10; One UI 2	MediaTek MT6739W	2 GB 3 GB	32 GB	13 MP (Wide) 2 MP (Macro)	5 MP	No	5,000 mAh	No
Galaxy M02s	6.5" HD+ PLS IPS Infinity-V Display (720 x 1600 pixels)	Android 10; One UI 2	Qualcomm Snapdragon 450	3 GB 4 GB	32 GB 64 GB	13 MP (Wide) 2 MP (Macro); 2 MP (Depth)	5 MP	No	5,000 mAh	15W Adaptive Fast Charging
Galaxy M12	6.5" HD+ 90 Hz PLS IPS Infinity-V Display (720 x 1600 pixels)	Android 11; One UI 3.1	Samsung Exynos 850	3 GB 4 GB; 6 GB (India)	32 GB 64 GB; 128 GB	48 MP (Wide) 5 MP (Ultrawide); 2 MP (Macro); 2 MP (Depth)	8 MP	Side-mounted	5,000 mAh 6,000 mAh (India)	15W Adaptive Fast Charging
Galaxy M22	6.4" HD+ 90 Hz Super AMOLED Infinity-U Display (720 x 1600 pixels)	Android 11; One UI 3.1	MediaTek Helio G80	4 GB 6 GB	64 GB 128 GB	48 MP (Wide) 8 MP (Ultrawide); 2 MP (Macro); 2 MP (Depth)	13 MP	Side-mounted	5,000 mAh	25W Adaptive Fast Charging
Galaxy M32	6.4” FHD+ 90 Hz Super AMOLED Infinity-U Display (1080 x 2400 pixels)	Android 11; One UI 3.1	MediaTek Helio G80	4 GB 6 GB; 8 GB	64 GB 128 GB	64 MP (Wide) 8 MP (Ultrawide); 2 MP (Macro); 2 MP (Depth)	20 MP	Side-mounted	5,000 mAh 6,000 mAh (India)	25W Adaptive Fast Charging
Galaxy M32 5G	6.5" HD+ PLS IPS Infinity-V Display (720 x 1600 pixels)	Android 11; One UI 3.1	MediaTek Dimensity 720	6 GB 8 GB	128 GB	48 MP (Wide) 8 MP (Ultrawide); 5 MP (Macro); 2 MP (Depth)	13 MP	Side-mounted	5,000 mAh	15W Adaptive Fast Charging
Galaxy M42 5G	6.6" HD+ Super AMOLED Infinity-U Display (720 x 1600 pixels)	Android 11; One UI 3.1	Qualcomm Snapdragon 750G	6 GB 8 GB	128 GB	48 MP (Wide) 8 MP (Ultrawide); 5 MP (Macro); 5 MP (Depth)	20 MP	Optical	5,000 mAh	15W Adaptive Fast Charging
Galaxy M52 5G	6.7" FHD+ 120 Hz Super AMOLED Plus Infinity-O Display (1080 x 2400 pixels)	Android 11; One UI 3.1	Qualcomm Snapdragon 778G	6 GB	128 GB	64 MP (Wide) 12 MP (Ultrawide); 5 MP (Macro)	32 MP	Side-mounted	5,000 mAh	25W Adaptive Fast Charging
Galaxy M62	6.7" FHD+ Super AMOLED Plus Infinity-O Display (1080 x 2400 pixels)	Android 11; One UI 3	Samsung Exynos 9825	8 GB	128 GB 256 GB	64 MP (Wide) 12 MP (Ultrawide); 5 MP (Macro); 5 MP (Depth)	32 MP	Side-mounted	7,000 mAh	25W Adaptive Fast Charging

=== Galaxy Mx3 (4th generation) ===
Model	Display	Operating System	Processor	Memory	Storage	Rear Camera	Front Camera	Fingerprint Sensor	Battery	Fast Charging
Galaxy M13	6.6" FHD+ PLS IPS Infinity-V Display (1080 x 2408 pixels)	Android 12; One UI Core 4/4.1	Samsung Exynos 850	4 GB 6 GB	64 GB 128 GB	50 MP (Wide) 5 MP (Ultrawide); 2 MP (Depth)	8 MP	Side-mounted	5000 mAh; 6000 mAh (India)	15W Adaptive Fast Charging
Galaxy M13 5G	6.5" HD+ 90 Hz PLS IPS Infinity-V Display (720 x 1600 pixels)	Android 12; One UI Core 4	MediaTek Dimensity 700	4 GB 6 GB	64 GB 128 GB	50 MP (Wide) 2 MP (Depth)	5 MP	Side-mounted	5000 mAh	15W Adaptive Fast Charging
Galaxy M23 5G	6.6" FHD+ 120 Hz TFT LCD Infinity-V Display (1080 x 2408 pixels)	Android 12; One UI 4.1	Qualcomm Snapdragon 750G	4 GB 6 GB	128 GB	50 MP (Wide) 8 MP (Ultrawide); 2 MP (Depth)	8 MP	Side-mounted	5000 mAh	25W Adaptive Fast Charging
Galaxy M33 5G	6.6" FHD+ 120 Hz TFT LCD Infinity-V Display (1080 x 2408 pixels)	Android 12; One UI 4.1	Samsung Exynos 1280	6 GB 8 GB	128 GB	50 MP (Wide) 8 MP (Ultrawide); 2 MP (Depth); 2 MP (Macro)	8 MP	Side-mounted	5000 mAh; 6000 mAh (India)	25W Adaptive Fast Charging
Galaxy M53 5G	6.7" FHD+ 120 Hz Super AMOLED Plus Infinity-O Display (1080 x 2408 pixels)	Android 12; One UI 4.1	MediaTek Dimensity 900	6 GB 8 GB	128 GB 256 GB	108 MP (Wide) 8 MP (Ultrawide); 2 MP (Depth); 2 MP (Macro)	32 MP	Side-mounted	5000 mAh	25W Adaptive Fast Charging

=== Galaxy Mx4 (5th generation) ===
Model	Display	Operating System	Processor	Memory	Storage	Rear Camera	Front Camera	Ultrasonc Fingerprint Sensor	Battery	Fast Charging
Galaxy M04	6.5" HD+ PLS IPS Infinity-V Display (720 x 1600 pixels)	Android 12 One UI Core 4.1	Mediatek Helio P35	4 GB	64 GB 128 GB	13 MP (Wide) 2MP (Depth)	5 MP	No	5000 mAh	15W Fast Charging
Galaxy M14	6.7" FHD+ 90 Hz PLS IPS; Infinity-U Display (1080 x 2400 pixels)	Android 13 One UI Core 5.1	Qualcomm Snapdragon 680 4G	4 GB 6 GB	64 GB 128 GB	50 MP (Wide) 2 MP (Macro); 2 MP (Depth)	13 MP	Side-mounted	5000 mAh	25W Fast Charging
Galaxy M14 5G	6.6" FHD+ 90 Hz PLS IPS Infinity-V Display (1080 x 2408 pixels)	Android 13 One UI Core 5.1	Samsung Exynos 1330	4 GB 6 GB	64 GB 128 GB	50 MP (Wide) 2 MP (Macro); 2 MP (Depth)	13 MP	Side-mounted	6000 mAh	15W Adaptive Fast Charging 25W Adaptive Fast Charging (India)
Galaxy M34 5G	6.5" FHD+ 120 Hz Super AMOLED Infinity-U Display (1080 x 2400 pixels)	Android 13 One UI 5.1	Samsung Exynos 1280	6 GB 8 GB	128 GB 256 GB	50 MP (Wide) 8 MP (Ultrawide); 2 MP (Macro)	13 MP	Side-mounted	6000 mAh	25W Fast Charging
Galaxy M54 5G	6.7" FHD+ 120 Hz Super AMOLED+ Infinity-O Display (1080 x 2400 pixels)	Android 13 One UI 5.1	Samsung Exynos 1380	8 GB	128 GB 256 GB	108 MP (Wide) 8 MP (Ultrawide); 2 MP (Macro)	32 MP	Side-mounted	6000 mAh	25W Fast Charging

=== Galaxy Mx5 (6th generation) ===
Model	Announced Date	Display	Operating System	Processor	Memory	Storage	Rear Camera	Front Camera	Fingerprint Sensor	Battery	Fast Charging
Galaxy M05	10 September 2024	6.7" HD+ PLS LCD Display (720 x 1600 pixels)	Android 14; One UI Core 6.0	Mediatek Helio G85	4GB	64GB	50 MP (wide); 2 MP (macro)	8 MP	No	5000 mAh	25W Fast Charging
Galaxy M15 5G	09 March 2024	6.5" FHD+ 90 Hz Super AMOLED Display (1080 x 2340 pixels)	Android 14; One UI 6.1	Mediatek Dimensity 6100 Plus	4 GB; 6 GB; 8 GB	128 GB; 256 GB	50 MP (wide); 5 MP (ultrawide); 2 MP (macro)	13 MP	Side-mounted	6,000 mAh	25W Fast Charging
Galaxy M35 5G	24 May 2024	6.6" FHD+ 120Hz Super AMOLED Display (1080 x 2340 pixels)	Android 14; One UI 6.1	Samsung Exynos 1380	6 GB; 8 GB	128 GB; 256 GB	50 MP (wide); 8 MP (ultrawide); 2 MP (macro)	13 MP	Side-mounted	6,000 mAh	25W Fast Charging
Galaxy M55 5G	28 March 2024	6.7" FHD+ 120 Hz Super AMOLED+ Display (1080 x 2400 pixels)	Android 14; One UI 6.1	Qualcomm Snapdragon 7 Gen 1	8 GB; 12 GB	128 GB; 256 GB	50 MP (wide); 8 MP (ultrawide); 2 MP (macro)	50 MP	In-display (Optical)	5,000 mAh	45 W Fast Charging
Galaxy M55s 5G	24 September 2024	6.7" FHD+ 120 Hz Super AMOLED+ Display (1080 x 2400 pixels)	Android 14; One UI 6.1	Qualcomm Snapdragon 7 Gen 1	8 GB	128 GB; 256 GB	50 MP (wide); 8 MP (ultrawide); 2 MP (macro)	50 MP	In-display (Optical)	5,000 mAh	45 W Fast Charging

=== Galaxy Mx6 (7th generation) ===
Model	Announced Date	Display	Operating System	Processor	Memory	Storage	Rear Camera	Front Camera	Fingerprint Sensor	Battery	Fast Charging
Galaxy M06 5G	27 February 2025	6.7" HD+ PLS LCD (720 x 1600 pixels)	Android 15; One UI 7.0	Mediatek Dimensity 6300 (6 nm)	4 GB; 6 GB	128 GB	50 MP (wide) 2 MP (depth)	8 MP	Side-mounted	5000 mAh	25W Fast Charging
Galaxy M16 5G	27 February 2025	6.7" FHD+ 90 Hz Super AMOLED Display (1080 x 2340 pixels)	Android 15; One UI 7.0	Mediatek Dimensity 6300 (6 nm)	4 GB; 6 GB; 8 GB	128 GB; 256 GB	50 MP (wide) 5 MP (ultrawide); 2 MP (macro)	13 MP	Side-mounted	5000 mAh	25W Fast Charging
Galaxy M36 5G	27 June 2025	6.7" FHD+ 120 Hz Super AMOLED Display (1080 x 2340 pixels)	Android 15; One UI 7.0	Samsung Exynos 1380 (5 nm)	6 GB; 8 GB	128 GB; 256 GB	50 MP (wide) 8 MP (ultrawide); 2 MP (macro)	13 MP	Side-mounted	5000 mAh	25W Fast Charging
Galaxy M56 5G	17 April 2025	6.74" FHD+ 120 Hz Super AMOLED+ Display (1080 x 2340 pixels)	Android 15; One UI 7.0	Samsung Exynos 1480 (4 nm)	8 GB	128 GB; 256 GB	50 MP (wide) 8 MP (ultrawide); 2 MP (macro)	12 MP	In-display (Optical)	5000 mAh	45W Fast Charging

=== Galaxy Mx7 (8th generation) ===
Model		M07	M17	M17e	M47
Support status		Supported			
Dates	Announced	18 September 2025	10 October 2025	17 March 2026	29 June 2026
Dates	Released	01 October 2025	13 October 2025	17 March 2026	04 July 2026
OS	Initial	One UI 7 Android 15		One UI 8 Android 16	One UI 8.5; Android 16
OS	Latest	One UI 8 Android 16			One UI 8.5; Android 16
OS	Support	6 major Android updates			
Dimensions mm (in)	Height	167.4 (6.59)	164.4 (6.47)	167.4 (6.59)	162.4 (6.39)
Dimensions mm (in)	Width	77.4 (3.05)	77.9 (3.07)	77.4 (3.05)	78.2 (3.08)
Dimensions mm (in)	Depth	7.6 (0.30)	7.5 (0.30)	8.2 (0.32)	8.1 (0.32)
Weight g (lb)		184 (0.406)	192 (0.423)	199 (0.439)	206 (0.454)
Colors					
Display	Size	6.7 in (170 mm)			
Display	Resolution	720 x 1600 px	1080 x 2340 px	720 x 1600 px	1080 x 2340 px
Display	Refresh Rate	90 Hz		120 Hz	
Display	Type	PLS LCD	Super AMOLED	PLS LCD	Super AMOLED
Display	Camera cutout	Infinity-U			Infinity-O
Display	Glass	—N/a	Corning Gorilla Glass Victus	—N/a	Corning Gorilla Glass Victus+
Front camera		8 MP	13 MP	8 MP	12 MP
Rear cameras	Wide	50 MP			
Rear cameras	Ultrawide	—N/a	5 MP	—N/a	5 MP
Rear cameras	Macro	—N/a	2 MP	—N/a	2 MP
Rear cameras	Depth	2 MP	—N/a	2 MP	—N/a
RAM		4 GB	4 GB; 6 GB; 8 GB	4 GB; 6 GB	6 GB; 8 GB
Storage		64 GB	128 GB		128 GB; 256 GB
Processor		MediaTek; Helio G99 (6 nm)	Samsung; Exynos 1330 (5 nm)	MediaTek; Dimensity 6300 (6 nm)	Qualcomm; Snapdragon 6 Gen 3 (4 nm)
Network Technology		GSM / HSPA / LTE	GSM / HSPA / LTE / 5G		
Fingerprint Sensor		Side-mounted			
Battery	Capacity (mAh)	5000		6000	
Battery	Replaceable	No			
Battery	Fast Charging	25 W			45 W
3.5 mm headphone jack		Yes	No	Yes	No
NFC		No	Yes	No	Yes
IP rating		IP54			IP64
