= Samsung Galaxy Duos =

Series of dual SIM Android smartphones developed by Samsung Electronics

Samsung Galaxy Duos (stylised as SAMSUNG GALAXY DUOS) is a series of Android-based dual SIM mobile devices designed, manufactured, and marketed by Samsung Electronics as Duos.

== Range ==
The Samsung Galaxy offers several different ranges of devices, including Smartphones, Phablets, and Tablets. Although widely known by marketing names, the underlying model ranges are best understood by looking at the model number. Since August 2011, all the smartphones of the Galaxy series are categorised in the following way (where x = I, N or S and nnn = model number):

- GT-x5nnn – Budget ("Realistic ") devices
- GT-x7nnn – Mid-range ("Slim") devices
- GT-x8nnn – Upper mid-range ("Loyal") devices
- GT-x9nnn – High end ("Clever ") devices
- GT-xnnn0 – mainstream model
- GT-xnnn2 – Dual SIM "Duos" model
- GT-xnnn5 – 3G/LTE model

Within the Smartphone ranges, Samsung often produces a Dual SIM variant, but these are not often widely available in many markets, where retail dominance by Mobile Network Operators (MNO) who operate a SIM-locked business model naturally deprecates Dual SIM devices.

== Duos Models ==
The following phones are available as Duos models

- GT-S6802 – GALAXY Ace DUOS
- GT-S7562 – Galaxy S Duos (Dual SIM version of Galaxy Ace IIx / Galaxy Trend)
- GT-I9082 – Galaxy Grand Duos
- GT-I9152 – Galaxy Mega 5.8 Duos
- GT-I9192 – Galaxy S4 Mini Duos
- GT-I8552 – Galaxy Win/Grand Quattro
- GT-I8262 – Galaxy Core Duos
- SM-G530H – Galaxy Grand Prime
- SM-G355H – Galaxy Core 2
- SM-J110H – Galaxy J1 Ace Duos
- SM-J500H/DS – Samsung Duos
- SM-J530F/DS – Samsung Galaxy J5 (2017)
- SM-A730F/DS – Galaxy A8+ Duos

== Samsung "Dual SIM Always on" feature ==
In their marketing materials, Samsung uses the term "Dual SIM Always On” to describe the Duos phones, although both SIM cards are not always on. All phones with this feature are regular, Dual SIM Stand-by (DSS) phones, with 1 transceiver (radio). The second SIM is always disconnected when a call is in progress on SIM 1 and vice versa.

The manual for such phone's states: “Your device supports dual standby with two different networks. You cannot make or answer calls on both networks at the same time.”

Samsung Galaxy Duos have a menu option entitled “Dual SIM Always On” which when activated, activates call forwarding on the carrier's network. This can be done manually on any phone, regardless of manufacturer, e.g., enable call forwarding to SIM 2 when SIM 1 is connected. Call Forwarding must be provided by the carrier, often for a fee, subscriber will also be charged for call forwarding on a minute-by-minute basis, this depends on the subscription agreement.

“Dual SIM Always On” might sound like it is enabling the dual SIM capability of the phone. However, that control is elsewhere. Each SIM card in a Samsung dual SIM phone can be set to on or off independently in the top section of the SIM card Manager menu. When both are set to ON, then both can connect incoming calls, but only one at a time. If SIM 2 is in use, a caller to SIM 2 will be redirected by the carrier network as though the phone were off or out of range. E.g., to voicemail. This is the default behaviour, and it is what happens if “Dual SIM Always On” is set to "Offline".

Setting “Dual SIM Always On” allows a call on one SIM to interrupt a call on the other SIM.
