= Samsung Galaxy M51 =

2020 mid-range Android smartphone from Samsung

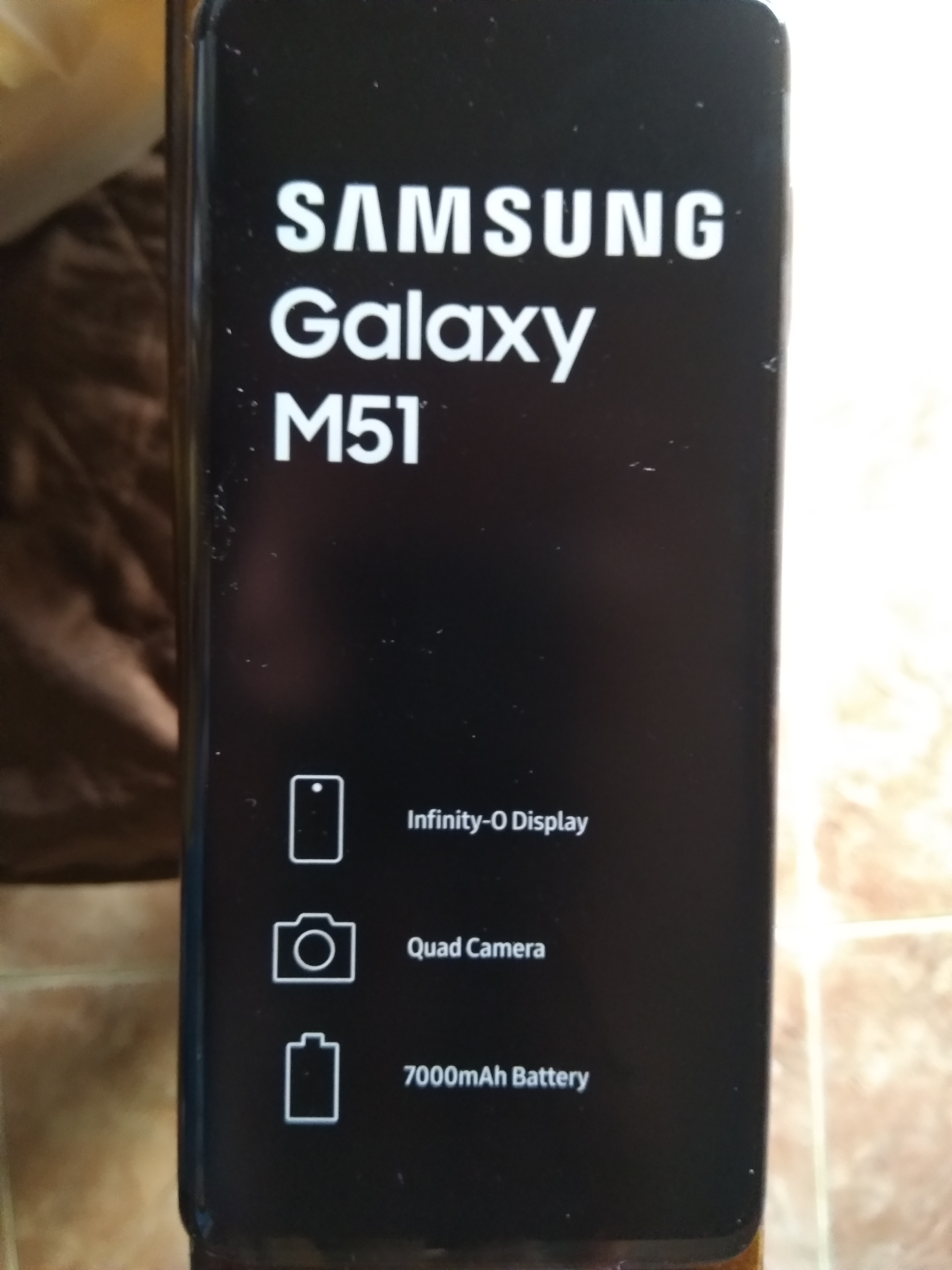
- Brand: Samsung
- Manufacturer: Samsung Electronics
- Type: Phablet
- Series: Samsung Galaxy M series
- First released: August 31, 2020; 6 years ago
- Availability by region: September 11, 2020
- Successor: Samsung Galaxy M52 5G; Samsung Galaxy M62
- Related: Samsung Galaxy M31; Samsung Galaxy A51
- Dimensions: 163.9 mm (6.45 in) H 76.3 mm (3.00 in) W 9.5 mm (0.37 in) D
- Operating system: Android 10 with One UI 2.1
- System-on-chip: Qualcomm SDM730 Snapdragon 730G (8 nm)
- CPU: Octa-core (2x2.2 GHz Kryo 470 Gold & 6x1.8 GHz Kryo 470 Silver)
- GPU: Adreno 618
- Memory: 6/8GB RAM
- Storage: 128GB/512GB ROM
- Removable storage: SD card
- Battery: 7000 mAh non-removable Lithium Polymer
- Charging: 25W Fast Charging
- Rear camera: Primary: Sony IMX 682; 64 MP, f/1.8, 26mm (wide), 1/1.73", 0.8µm, PDAF; Ultrawide: Samsung ISOCELL S5K3L6; 12 MP, f/2.2, 13mm, 123˚, 1/3.0", 1.12µm; Macro: GalaxyCore GC5035; 5 MP, f/2.4, 1/5.0", 1.12µm; Depth: GalaxyCore GC5035; 5 MP, f/2.4, 1/5.0", 1.12µm; LED flash, Panorama, HDR; 4K@30fps, 1080p@30fps
- Front camera: Sony IMX 616; 32 MP, f/2.0, 26mm (wide), 1/2.74", 0.8µm; HDR; 4K@30fps, 1080p@30fps
- Display: 6.7 in sAMOLED Plus 1080 x 2400 pixels, 20:9 ratio (~385 ppi density)
- Data inputs: USB-C
- Model: SM-M515F/DSN
- SAR: 0.61 W/kg (head); 1.45 W/kg (body)
- Website: www.samsung.com/in/smartphones/galaxy-m51-m515fz-6gb/SM-M515FZBDINS/

The Samsung Galaxy M51 is a mid-range Android-based smartphone manufactured by Samsung Electronics as part of their M series. It was announced in late August 2020 and released the following month. The phone has a 6.7 in sAMOLED Plus display, a 64 MP quad-camera setup, and a 7000 mAh battery. It is primarily derived from the Samsung Galaxy A71 in terms of design and specifications.

== Specifications ==
=== Hardware ===
The Samsung Galaxy M51 has a Super AMOLED Plus Infinity-O Display with a 1080 × 2400 resolution, a 20:9 aspect ratio, and a pixel density of ~385 ppi. The phone comes with 128 GB of internal storage, as well as either 6 or 8 GB of RAM. The storage can be expanded via microSD. The phone is powered by the Qualcomm SDM730 Snapdragon 730G (8 nm) paired with the Adreno 618 GPU.

==== Battery ====
The Samsung Galaxy M51 has a non-removable lithium-ion with a 7000 mAh capacity. This is the highest battery capacity of any Samsung Galaxy phone as of September 2020, and significantly higher than most other widely available phones.

==== Cameras ====
The Samsung Galaxy M51 has a quad-camera setup arranged in an “L” shape in the top left corner of the back plastic. The camera setup consists of a 64 MP wide-angle camera, capable of 4K video recording, a 12 MP ultrawide camera, a 5 MP depth camera for close-up shots, and a 5 MP depth sensor for Live Focus. A single 32 MP front-facing camera is tucked into the punch-hole in the top center of the display.

=== Software ===
The Samsung Galaxy M51 comes with Android 10 with Samsung's signature One UI 2.1. In late 2021, Samsung announced that Samsung Galaxy M51 will receive Android 12 updates based on One UI 4.1.

== History ==
The Samsung Galaxy M51 was announced on August 31, 2020. It was released the following month on September 11, 2020.

== See also ==
- Samsung Galaxy M series
- Samsung Galaxy
