= Samsung Galaxy M20 =

2019 budget smartphone by Samsung Electronics

- Brand: Samsung
- Manufacturer: Samsung Electronics
- Type: Smartphone
- Series: Galaxy M
- Family: Samsung Galaxy
- First released: February 5, 2019; 7 years ago (India)
- Successor: Samsung Galaxy M21
- Related: Samsung Galaxy M10; Samsung Galaxy M30; Samsung Galaxy M40
- Compatible networks: 2G / 3G / 4G LTE
- Form factor: Slate
- Dimensions: 156.4 mm × 74.5 mm × 8.8 mm (6.16 in × 2.93 in × 0.35 in)
- Weight: 186 g (6.6 oz)
- Operating system: Original: Worldwide (Ex. South Korea): Android 8.1 "Oreo" with Samsung Experience 9.5; South Korea: Android 9 "Pie" with One UI 1.1; Current: Android Q 10 with One UI 2.0
- System-on-chip: Samsung Exynos 7904 Octa (14 nm)
- CPU: Octa-core (2x1.8 GHz Cortex-A73 and 6x1.6 GHz Cortex-A53)
- GPU: Mali-G71 MP2
- Memory: 3/4 GB RAM
- Storage: 32/64 GB
- Removable storage: microSD, expandable up to 512 GB
- Battery: 5000 mAh (non-removable), USB-C fast charge
- Rear camera: Dual: 13 MP, f/1.9, 1/2.8", 1.12 μm, PDAF, 1080p at 30 fps 5 MP, f/2.2, 1/6", 1.12 μm, ultra wide angle sensor
- Front camera: 8 MP, f/2.0, 1080p at 30 fps
- Display: 1080×2340 1080p PLS TFT capacitive touchscreen, 16M colors 6.3 in (160 mm), 409 ppi)
- Sound: 3.5 mm (0.14 in) jack, vibration, active noise cancellation, Dolby Atmos
- Connectivity: WiFi (2.4 GHz only), Wi-Fi Direct, Hotspot (Wi-Fi), Bluetooth 5.0, FM radio with Radio Data System, USB OTG, GNSS connectivity via GPS, GLONASS, Galileo and Baidu.
- Data inputs: Sensors: Accelerometer; Fingerprint sensor Proximity sensor Compass; Gyroscope; Virtual light sensor Other: Physical sound volume keys
- Model: SM-M205

The Samsung Galaxy M20 is an online-exclusive budget Android-based smartphone manufactured, developed and produced by Samsung Electronics. It was unveiled on January 28, 2019 and released on February 5, 2019.

== Variants ==
Samsung Galaxy M20 2019
Model	Notes
SM-M205F/DS	India, Africa, Arabic
SM-M205G/DS	Southeast Asia
SM-M205FN/DS	Europe
SM-M205M/DS	Latin America
SM-M205N	South Korea
