= Samsung Galaxy Discover =

Android smartphone

Samsung Galaxy Discover SGH-S730M/G
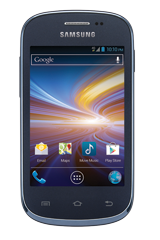
- Manufacturer: Samsung Electronics
- Type: Smartphone
- Series: Samsung Galaxy
- First released: November 2012
- Compatible networks: GSM
- Form factor: Slate
- Dimensions: 112.8 mm (4.44 in) H 61.5 mm (2.42 in) W 11.5 mm (0.45 in) D
- Weight: 122 g (4.3 oz)
- Operating system: Original: Android 4.0.4 "Ice Cream Sandwich"; Unofficial: Android 4.2 "Jelly Bean"
- System-on-chip: Qualcomm Snapdragon S1 MSM7225A
- CPU: 800 MHz Cortex-A5
- GPU: 128 MHz Adreno 200
- Memory: 512 MB
- Storage: 4 GB
- Removable storage: microSD (supports up to 32 GB)
- Battery: Removable 1300 mAh Li-ion
- Rear camera: 3.15 MP
- Display: TFT LCD 3.5", 165 ppi, 320x480 px, 256k colors
- Connectivity: 3.5 mm jack Bluetooth micro USB 2.0; Wi-Fi 802.11b/g
- Data inputs: Multi-touch, capacitive touchscreen A-GPS
- Model: SGH-S730M, SGH-S730G
- Website: https://www.samsung.com/ca/support/model/SGH-S730HKMBWA/

The Samsung Galaxy Discover (SGH-S730M/G) is a smartphone manufactured by Samsung that runs the Android operating system. It was released to the budget market and was known to perform poorly due to its obsolete specifications. Because of its poor specs, this device is one of the few Android phones released by Samsung to not use TouchWiz or any custom skin. This device was available through prepaid carriers such as Cricket Wireless and TracFone.

== Features ==
The Galaxy Discover is a 3G smartphone that offers quad-band GSM and was announced with two-band HSDPA. The display is a 3.5 in (89 mm)-diagonal TFT LCD with a 320x480 px resolution supporting up to 256,000 colors. Unlike most Samsung Galaxy phones, the Galaxy Discover comes with the stock Android UI rather than TouchWiz. This phone did not officially receive any software updates, but custom ROMs have been made for the device allowing it to run Android 4.2 "Jelly Bean".

== See also ==
- Samsung Galaxy S III Mini
