= Samsung Galaxy M52 5G =

Android smartphone manufactured by Samsung Electronics

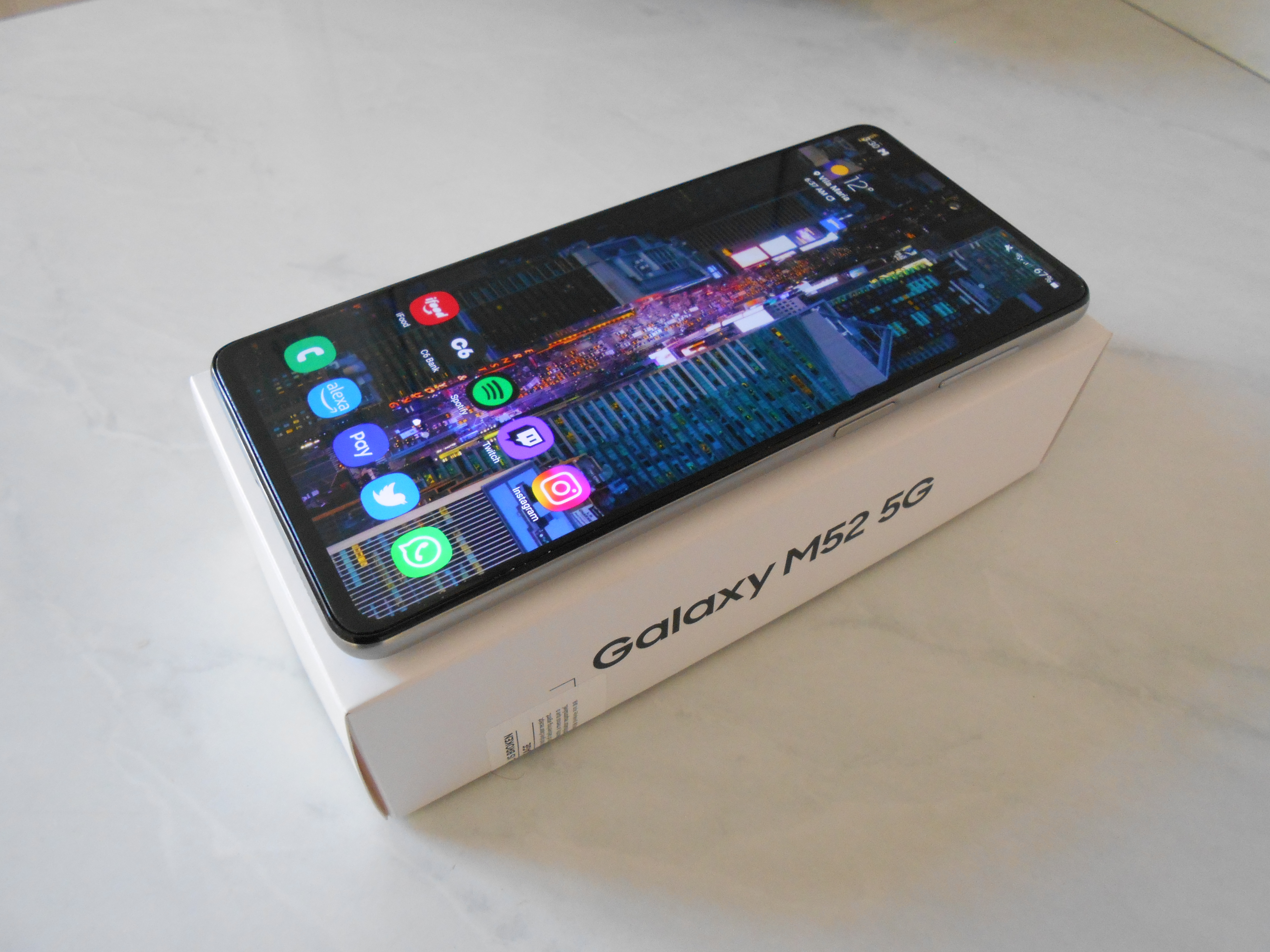
- Brand: Samsung Galaxy
- Manufacturer: Samsung
- Type: Phablet
- Series: Samsung Galaxy M series
- Availability by region: October 3, 2021
- Predecessor: Samsung Galaxy M51
- Successor: Samsung Galaxy M53 5G
- Compatible networks: GSM / HSPA / LTE / 5G
- Form factor: Slate
- Dimensions: 164.2 mm (6.46 in) H 76.4 mm (3.01 in) W 7.4 mm (0.29 in) D
- Weight: 173 g (6.1 oz)
- Operating system: Android 11 with One UI 3.1 upgradable to Android 13 with One UI 5.1
- System-on-chip: Qualcomm SM7325 Snapdragon 778G 5G (6 nm)
- CPU: Octa-core (4x2.4 GHz Kryo 670 & 4x1.8 GHz Kryo 670)
- GPU: Adreno 642L
- Memory: 6 GB / 8 GB RAM
- Storage: 128 GB
- Removable storage: microSDXC
- SIM: Hybrid Dual SIM (Nano-SIM, dual stand-by)
- Battery: 5000 mAh Li-Ion non-removable battery
- Charging: 25W fast charging
- Rear camera: 64 MP, f/1.8, 26mm wide, PDAF; 12 MP, f/2.2, 123˚, ultrawide 5 MP, f/2.4, macro LED flash, panorama, HDR; 4K@30fps and 1080p@30/60fps video recording
- Front camera: 32 MP, f/2.2, wide 1080p@30/60fps video recording
- Display: 6.7 inches, 108.4 cm2 (~86.4% screen-to-body ratio); 1080 x 2400 pixels, 20:9 ratio (~393 ppi density); Super AMOLED Plus, 120Hz, HDR10, Corning Gorilla Glass 5
- Sound: Loudspeaker
- Connectivity: Wi-Fi 802.11 a/b/g/n/ac/6, dual-band, Wi-Fi Direct, hotspot Bluetooth 5.0, A2DP, LE; USB Type-C 2.0
- Data inputs: Sensors: Fingerprint (side-mounted), accelerometer, gyro, proximity, compass

The Samsung Galaxy M52 5G is a mid-range Android-based smartphone developed by Samsung Electronics as a part of its Galaxy M series. The device was scheduled to be launched on 19 September 2021 in India but the launch event was postponed to 28 September 2021. It was unveiled on 24 September 2021. Its key features are Qualcomm's new upper mid-range SoC Snapdragon 778G 5G, 120 Hz Super AMOLED Plus display, a triple camera setup with a 64 MP main camera and a 5000 mAh battery with 25W fast charging support. It went on sale on 3 October 2021 in India.

== Specifications ==
=== Design ===
Samsung Galaxy M52 5G has a plastic frame and a plastic back panel, the front side is covered by glass. It has volume buttons and a recessed power button that doubles as a fingerprint reader at the right, a SIM/microSD card tray at the left and a USB-C port at the bottom. It has a 6.7 inch Infinity-O Display with a circular punch hole for the front-facing camera. It measures 164.2 x 76.4 x 7.4 mm and weighs 173 grams. It is available in Icy Blue, Blazing Black and White.

=== Hardware ===
Samsung Galaxy M52 5G is powered by Qualcomm Snapdragon 778G 5G system-on-chip with 6 nm process, an integrated 5G modem, an octa-core CPU consisting of a high performance cluster with 4x 2.4 GHz Kryo 670 Gold cores and a power efficiency cluster with 4x 1.8 GHz Kryo 670 Silver cores, and an Adreno 642L GPU. It has a 6.7-inch (172 mm) Super AMOLED Plus display with 1080×2400 pixels resolution, 20:9 aspect ratio, ~393 ppi pixel density, 120 Hz refresh rate and 16M colors. It features a triple camera setup at the rear with a 64 MP main camera with f/1.8 aperture, a 12 MP wide-angle camera with f/2.2 aperture and 123° field-of-view, and a 5 MP macro camera with f/2.4 aperture. There is a 32 MP front-facing camera with f/2.2 aperture located in the circular punch hole of the display. It supports 4K video recording from the main camera and the front facing camera. It has a 5000 mAh non-removable battery with 25W fast charging support. However, there isn't a 25W charger in the box, and it needs to be bought separately. It comes with 6/8 GB RAM and 128 GB internal storage and supports memory expansion via the hybrid SIM/microSD card slot up to 1 TB. It supports 11 5G bands. Unlike most of the phones in the Galaxy M series, Galaxy M52 5G doesn't have a headphone jack.

=== Software ===
Samsung Galaxy M52 5G is shipped with Android 11 and Samsung's proprietary user interface One UI 3.1. It comes with Knox Security Suite and AltZMode. The camera application includes the Single Take mode that enables users to take photo and record video from all the supported camera simultaneously. The software will be updated quarterly.
