= Samsung Galaxy Win =

Smartphone model

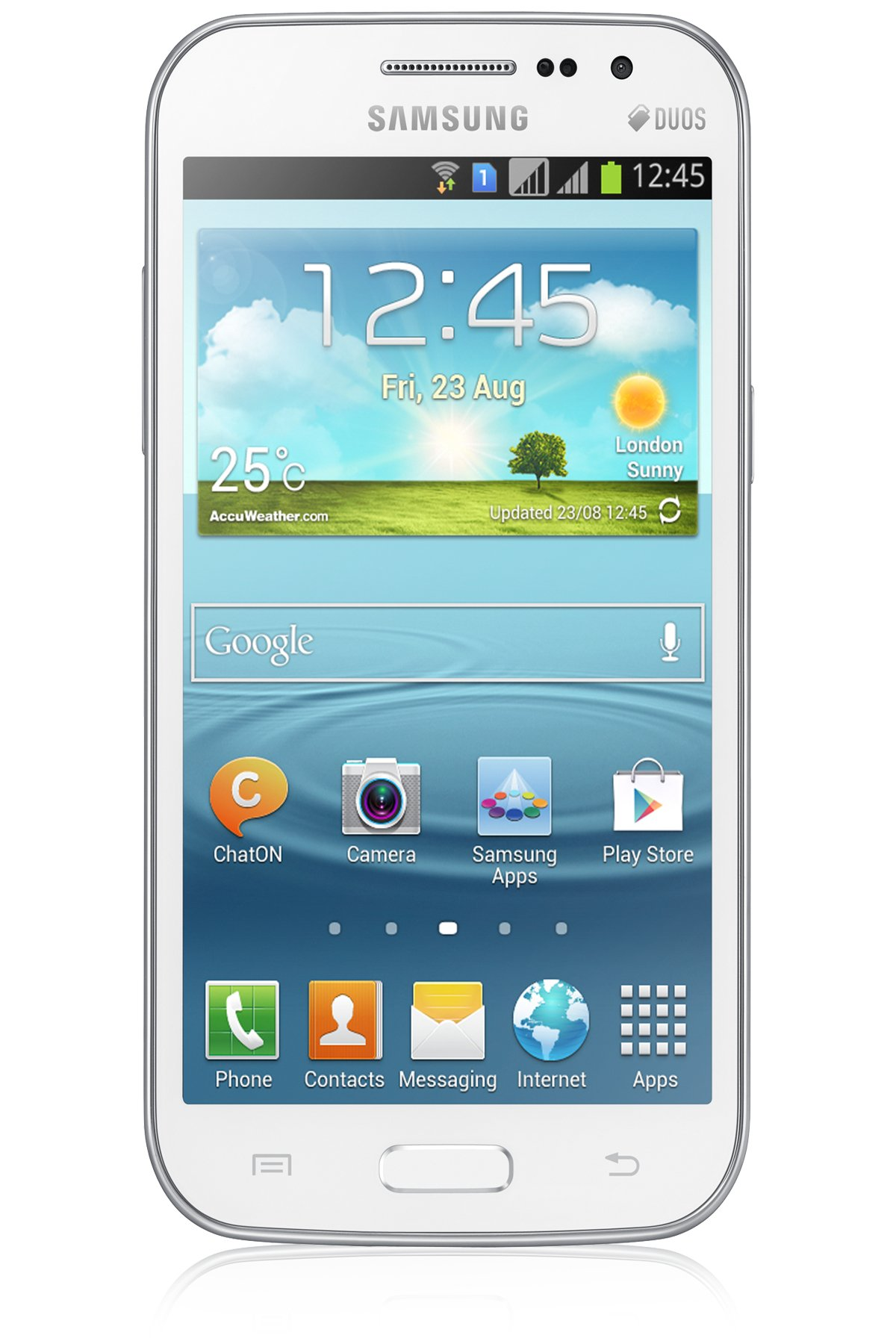
- Also known as: Samsung Galaxy Grand Quattro
- Manufacturer: Samsung Electronics
- Type: Touchscreen smartphone
- Series: Samsung Galaxy
- First released: 20 May 2013 (GT-I8552)
- Compatible networks: EDGE / GPRS (850 / 900 / 1,800 / 1,900MHZ) HSPA+ 21 / 5.76 Mbps
- Form factor: Slate
- Weight: 144 g (5.1 oz)
- Operating system: Android 4.1.2 Jelly Bean
- System-on-chip: Qualcomm Snapdragon 200 MSM8625Q
- CPU: 1.2 GHz Cortex-A5 quad-core
- Memory: 1 GB RAM
- Storage: 8 GB
- Removable storage: micro-SD up to 64 GB
- Battery: Li-ion 2000 mAh
- Rear camera: 5 MP 720p*480 Video Recording 30fps without auto-focus; Self-timer; Panorama; Smile Shot; Face detection; Stop motion
- Front camera: 0.3 MP VGA camera
- Display: 4.7 in (12 cm) TFT Capacitive; 800×480p WVGA
- Connectivity: Bluetooth 4.0 micro-USB 2.0; Wi-Fi (802.11a/b/g/n); Wi-Fi Direct; FM radio with RDS; A-GPS and GLONASS
- Data inputs: Multi-touch capacitive touchscreen display Ambient light sensors Microphone; 3-axis Magnetometer (Compass) aGPS; 3-axis accelerometer Stereo FM Radio With RDS and Swype
- Model: GT-I8550L (Latin America); GT-I8550E (Chile); GT-I8552 (Dual SIM); GT-I8552B (Brazil)

The Samsung Galaxy Win, also known as Galaxy Grand Quattro in some markets, is a smartphone developed by Samsung Electronics. It was announced by Samsung on May 20, 2013. The Samsung Galaxy Win has a quad core Cortex-A5 1.2 GHz processor and a RAM of 1 GB, with an internal memory of 8 GB which can be extended to another 64 GB by use of microSD cards. The device also supports internet connectivity through 2G and 3G, apart from Wi-Fi. Navigation systems including A-GPS with Google Maps. The smartphone runs on the Android 4.1.2 Jelly Bean OS.

The smartphone has a 5 MP rear camera that is capable of high-resolution photos and video capture. The secondary front-facing camera is a 0.3 MP camera. The primary camera is capable of video recording at 720*480 at 30 frames per second. The camera comes with an LED flash that is capable of illuminating subjects in low-light conditions.

Auto-Focus, Geo-tagging, Touch Focus, and Face detection are some of the advanced features supported by the Samsung Galaxy Win I8552. There is an image stabilizer and smile detector, and a basic image editor included.

The Samsung Galaxy Win is powered with 2000 mAh Li-ion that is capable of powering the Galaxy Win for up to 10 hours. The 4.7-inch TFT WVGA, Multi-touch screen with 16M colors.

== Model variants ==
=== South America ===
GT-I8550L

=== Chile ===
GT-I8550E

=== Malaysia ===
GT-I8552

=== China ===
Galaxy Win Pro (SM-G3812)

Galaxy Win Pro (SM-G3818)

Galaxy Win Pro (SM-G3819)

Galaxy Win Pro (SM-G3819D)

GT-I8558

SCH-I869

=== Korea ===
SHV-E500S/L

=== Brazil ===
GT-I8552B
