= Samsung Galaxy M01 =

Samsung smartphone announced in June 2020

Samsung Galaxy M01 Samsung Galaxy M01 Core
- Brand: Samsung
- Manufacturer: Samsung Electronics
- Series: Galaxy M
- Family: Samsung Galaxy
- First released: June 2020; 6 years ago
- Related: Samsung Galaxy M01s
- Colors: Black, blue, red
- Weight: 168 g (5.9 oz)
- Operating system: Original: Android 10, Upgradable to: Android 12
- System-on-chip: Qualcomm Snapdragon 439
- CPU: Octa-core (4x1.95 GHz Cortex-A53 & 4x1.45 GHz Cortex A53)
- GPU: Adreno 505
- Memory: 3 GB RAM
- Storage: 32 GB internal storage
- Battery: 4000 mAh Li-ion battery (non-removable)
- Rear camera: 13 MP wide, 2 MP depth
- Front camera: 5 MP
- Display: 5.7 in (14 cm) PLS IPS 720 x 1520 pixels, 19:9 ratio (~294 ppi density)
- Connectivity: Wi-Fi, Wi-Fi Direct, Wi-Fi Hotspot, Bluetooth
- SAR: Sar EU: 0.42 W/kg (head) 1.56 W/kg (body)
- Website: www.samsung.com/in/smartphones/galaxy-m/galaxy-m01-black-32gb-sm-m015gzkdins/

The Samsung Galaxy M01 is an Android-based smartphone developed and manufactured by Samsung Electronics. It was announced in June 2020. The phone has PLS IPS display, a 13 MP camera and a 2 MP depth camera. This phone has a 4000 mAh Li-ion battery.

== Specifications ==
=== Hardware ===
The Galaxy M01 has a 5.7 inch PLS IPS display with 720x1520 pixel resolution. It has pixel density of ~294 ppi. The phone measures 147.5mm x 70.9mm x 9.8 mm. It is powered by Snapdragon 439 soc. It has an Octa-core (4x1.95 GHz Cortex-A53 & 4x1.45 GHz Cortex A53) CPU and Adreno 505 GPU. It comes with 3 RAM and 32 GB internal storage. It has 4000 mAh Li-ion battery.

==== Cameras ====
The Samsung Galaxy M01 has a 13 MP camera and a 2 MP depth camera. It also has a 5 MP single front camera. Both the cameras can record video in 1080p in 30fps.

=== Software ===
The Samsung Galaxy M01 comes preinstalled with Android 10. It also got Android 12 update.

=== Design ===
The Samsung Galaxy M01 comes in Black, blue and red colors.

== See also ==
- Samsung Electronics
- Samsung Galaxy
- Samsung Galaxy A01
- Samsung Galaxy M series
- Samsung Galaxy A series
- One UI
