= Samsung Galaxy Prevail =

Android smartphone

- Manufacturer: Samsung Electronics
- Series: Samsung Galaxy
- First released: April 11, 2011; 15 years ago
- Compatible networks: Boost Mobile
- Form factor: Slate
- Dimensions: 4.4 in (110 mm) H 2.3 in (58 mm) W 0.5 in (13 mm) D
- Weight: 3.8 oz (110 g)
- Storage: micro-SD (up to 32 GB supported)
- Rear camera: 2 MP
- Display: 3.2 in (81 mm)
- Model: SPH-M820

The Samsung Galaxy Prevail is an Android-based smartphone with 3.2-inch display, announced on April 5, 2011, for $180. It was the first Samsung Galaxy phone sold by Boost Mobile and is part of the Samsung Galaxy family, although it does not include Samsung's TouchWiz user interface. Its model number is SPH-M820. It was sold exclusively by Boost Mobile. It has 2 MP camera, GPS, Bluetooth, WiFi and supports up to 32 GB microSD memory cards. It is powered by a Qualcomm 800 MHz MSM7000 chip. It shipped with Android 2.2 Froyo.

The Galaxy Prevail measures 4.4x2.3x0.5 inches and weighs 3.8 ounces. Battery is a 3.7v Li-ion, 1500 mAh, model EB504465VA (Which is also compatible with the Samsung Acclaim SCH-R880, Samsung Craft SCH-R900, Samsung Indulge SCH-910, Samsung Intercept SPH-910, Samsung Replenish SPH-M580, Samsung Sidekick 4G SGH-T839 and Samsung Transform SPH-M920.)

On September 19, 2012, Boost Mobile and Samsung released an update to the Galaxy Prevail in the form of the Samsung Galaxy Rush.

== Galaxy Prevail LTE ==
There is also an LTE version of the Prevail, with a 5 MP rear camera, 2 MP front camera, 1.2 GHz quad-core Qualcomm Snapdragon 410, 1 GB RAM, and 8 GB internal storage.

== See also ==
- Galaxy Nexus
