= Samsung Galaxy M10 =

Android smartphone model released in 2019

- Brand: Samsung Galaxy
- Manufacturer: Samsung Electronics
- Type: Smartphone
- Series: Samsung Galaxy M series
- First released: 28 January 2019; 7 years ago
- Predecessor: Samsung Galaxy A6
- Successor: Samsung Galaxy M11
- Related: Galaxy M20
- Compatible networks: 2G; 3G; LTE
- Form factor: Slate
- Dimensions: 155.6 mm × 75.6 mm × 7.7 mm (6.13 in × 2.98 in × 0.30 in)
- Weight: 163 g (5.7 oz)
- Operating system: Original: Android 8.1 Oreo; Last: Android 10
- System-on-chip: Samsung Exynos 7870 Octa
- CPU: Octa-core 1.6 GHz Cortex-A53
- GPU: Mali-T830 MP1
- Memory: 2/3 GB RAM
- Storage: 16/32 GB
- Removable storage: microSD, expandable up to 512 GB
- Battery: 3400 mAh (non-removable)
- Rear camera: Dual: 13 MP, f/1.9, 1/3.1", 1.12 μm, PDAF, 1080p at 30 fps; 5 MP, f/2.2, 1/5", 1.12 μm, depth sensor
- Front camera: 5 MP, f/2.0, 1080p at 30 fps
- Display: 720×1520 720p PLS TFT capacitive touchscreen, 16M colors; 6.22 in (158 mm), 270 ppi)
- Sound: 3.5 mm (0.14 in) jack, vibration, active noise cancellation
- Data inputs: Sensors: Accelerometer; Proximity sensor; Other: Physical sound volume keys
- Model: SM-M105F / SM-M105G

The Samsung Galaxy M10 is an Android-based smartphone produced by Samsung Electronics, part of the Samsung Galaxy M series online-exclusive budget smartphones. It was unveiled on 28 January 2019 and was released on 5 February that year.

== Specifications ==
The phone is powered by a 1.6 GHz octa-core Exynos 7870 chipset which is based on a 14 nm process and offers eight ARM Cortex-A53 cores clocked at 1.6 GHz. The phone is equipped with a 6.2-inch HD+ (720x1520 pixels) Infinity-V display that has a 19:9 aspect ratio and runs on Android 8.

== Camera ==
The rear camera array is mounted flush on the back. There is a 13 MP wide‑angle camera with an f/1.9 aperture, a sensor size of 1/3.1″, a pixel size of 1.12 μm, and phase‑detection autofocus. There is also a 5 MP ultra‑wide angle lens with an f/2.2 aperture (approx. 120° field of view). The module includes an LED flash. Video recording is supported at Full HD (1080p) at 30 fps. On the front, there is a 5 MP selfie camera with an f/2.0 aperture, capable of 1080p video recording.

There is HDR mode for improved contrast in challenging lighting. The camera app also includes panorama and selfie beauty filters. No dedicated depth sensor or bokeh ("live focus") mode is present on this model. Optical image stabilization (OIS) is not supported.
