= Samsung Galaxy Core Plus =

2013 Android smartphone from Samsung

Samsung Galaxy Core Plus (Samsung Galaxy Trend 3 in China)
- Brand: Samsung
- Manufacturer: Samsung Electronics
- Type: Smartphone
- Series: Galaxy Core series/Galaxy Trend series
- Availability by region: October 2013
- Predecessor: Samsung Galaxy Trend 2
- Form factor: Slate
- Weight: 132.5 g (5 oz)
- Operating system: TouchWiz Nature UX 2.0: Trend 3 (SM-G3508, SM-G3508I, SM-G3509, SM-G3509I): Android 4.1.2 "Jelly Bean"; Core Plus (most of models) / Trend 3 (SM-G3502, SM-G3502U): Android 4.2.2 "Jelly Bean"; Core Plus (SM-G3502L) / Trend 3 (most of models): Android 4.3 "Jelly Bean"
- CPU: Dual-core 1.2 GHz
- GPU: Broadcom Videocore IV
- Memory: 512/768MB RAM
- Storage: 4GB
- Removable storage: microSD, up to 64GB
- Battery: Removable Li-Ion 1800 mAh battery
- Rear camera: 5 MP
- Front camera: 0.3 MP
- Display: 4.3 in
- Sound: Mono speaker

Samsung Galaxy Core Plus (also known as the Samsung Galaxy Trend 3 in China) is an Android smartphone developed by Samsung Electronics. It was released in October 2013 and ran on Android 4.2.2 (Jelly Bean) and had a 4.3 inch display.

== History ==
The Samsung Galaxy Core Plus was announced and released in October 2013. This model became available mere months after the original Galaxy Core came out in May 2013. This release has been viewed as part of a strategy to deliver new handsets to keep consumer interest.

== Specifications ==
The Samsung Galaxy Core Plus had 4GB internal storage, expandable via microSD up to 64GB, along with 512MB RAM. It had an 1800 mAh battery and a 4.3 inch display. It was equipped with a 5 MP rear-facing and 0.3 MP front-facing camera.

There are other variants introduced in other markets that feature different specifications. For example, the Galaxy Core Plus released in the Taiwanese market and Europe shipped with 768 MB of RAM. This was noted for being inferior to the original Core model, which had 1 GB of RAM and 8GB internal storage.

== See also ==
- Samsung Galaxy Core
- Samsung Galaxy Core Prime
- Samsung Galaxy
