= Samsung Galaxy M30s =

Android phablet by Samsung

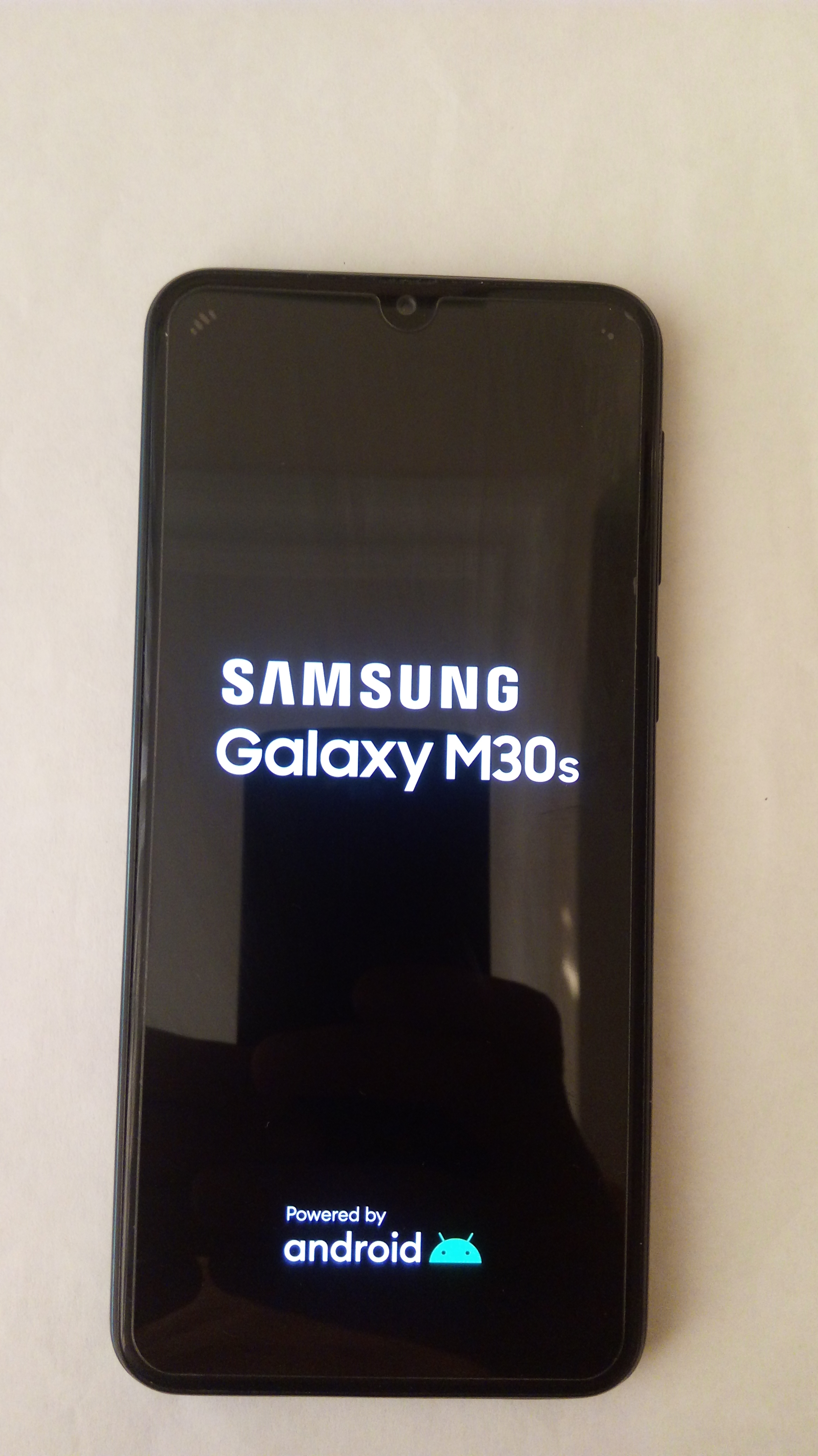
- Brand: Samsung Galaxy
- Manufacturer: Samsung Electronics
- Type: Phablet
- Series: Galaxy M
- First released: 18 September 2019; in India
- Availability by region: US, India, UK: 29 September 2019; 7 years ago
- Predecessor: Galaxy M30
- Successor: Galaxy M31
- Related: Galaxy A50s
- Compatible networks: Wi-Fi; 2G; 3G; LTE
- Dimensions: 159 mm (6.3 in) H; 75.1 mm (2.96 in) W; 8.9 mm (0.35 in) D
- Weight: 188 g (6.6 oz)
- Operating system: Android 11 with One UI Core 3.1
- System-on-chip: Samsung Exynos 9611 Octa
- CPU: Octa-core 8 × 2.3 GHz and 4 × 1.7 GHz Cortex-A73 and Cortex-A53
- GPU: Mali-G72 MP3
- Memory: 4/6 GB RAM
- Storage: 64/128 GB
- Removable storage: microSD, expandable up to 1 TB (dedicated slot)
- Battery: 6000 mAh Li-Po (non-removable)
- Rear camera: 48 MP, f/2.0 aperture, 0.8 μm pixel size, PDAF, 4K or 1080p at 30 fps, gyro-EIS; 8 MP, f/2.2 aperture, 12 mm focal length ultra wide sensor; 5 MP depth sensor, f/2.2 aperture
- Front camera: 16 MP, f/2.0 aperture, 1080p at 30 fps
- Display: 6.4 in (160 mm), (1080×2340) 1080p Super AMOLED capacitive touchscreen, 19.5:9 ratio, 100.5cm² (~91% screen-to-body ratio), 16M colors, ~403 ppi
- Sound: Loudspeaker; Dolby Atmos
- Connectivity: WLAN: Wi-Fi 802.11 a/b/g/n/ac, dual-band, Wi-Fi Direct, Hotspot; Bluetooth: 5.0, A2DP, LE; GPS: A-GPS, GLONASS, BDS; USB: 2.0, Type-C 1.0 reversible connector
- Data inputs: Audio Jack: 3.5 mm; Microphone: Active noise cancellation with Dedicated Mic
- Hearing aid compatibility: Dolby Atmos Sound
- Other: FM radio; RDS; Recording; Vibration; Gyroscope; Fingerprint; Accelerometer; Proximity; Compass
- Website: SAMSUNG India (M30s)

The Samsung Galaxy M30s is an Android-based phone manufactured by Samsung Electronics as part of its first-generation Galaxy M series lineup, as a successor to the Samsung Galaxy M30. The phone is shipped with Android 9 (Pie), Samsung's proprietary One UI skin, 64 or 128 GB of internal storage, and a 6000 mAh Li-Po battery. The M30s was released on 18 September 2019. It features a rear triple camera array composing of a 48 MP wide angle camera, 8 MP ultra wide angle camera, and a 5 MP depth sensor.

== Specifications ==
=== Hardware ===
The Samsung Galaxy M30s comes with a 6.4" FHD+ (1080×2340) Super AMOLED Infinity-U Display with a U-shaped notch for the selfie camera, similar to Samsung Galaxy M30. This results in a screen-to-body ratio of 91%. The display has a contrast ratio of 78960:1 and a max brightness of 420 nits. The phone has 4 GB and 6 GB RAM versions, with 64 GB or 128 GB of internal storage, respectively. The storage for both versions is expandable up to 1 TB via microSD card. The phone has a 6000 mAh Li-Po battery supporting wired 15W fast charging. The battery is the largest ever for a Samsung smartphone, and the largest for a smartphone released in India. A fingerprint scanner is mounted in the back. The phone has Exynos 9611 system on chip comprising an octa-core 10 nm CPU with 4×2.3 GHz Cortex-A73 & 4×1.7 GHz Cortex-A53 clusters and Mali-G72 MP3 GPU.

==== Camera ====
The rear camera array is mounted on a rectangular bump. There is a 48 MP wide angle camera with f/2.0 aperture, pixel size of 0.8 μm and phase-detection autofocus. There is an 8 MP ultra-wide angle lens with f/2.2 aperture, focal length of 12mm and 123° field of view. Finally, there is a 5 MP depth sensor with f/2.2 aperture. The area in the rectangular bump not filled by the cameras and flash contains the characters "48 mega pixels". There is a night mode that increases the brightness at low light levels, while reducing noise, and a live focus mode that creates a Bokeh effect through the depth sensor. The camera supports 4K video recording at 30 fps, super-steady video, hyperlapse, slow motion video and HDR. Additionally, it features Samsung's scene optimizer technology which recognizes 20 different scenes using AI and automatically adjusts the camera settings. It has a 16 MP selfie camera located in the display notch.

=== Software ===
The Samsung Galaxy M30s runs on the Android 11 operating system with Samsung's One UI skin which repositions the touch area in stock Samsung apps towards the bottom, thus making the user interface easier for one handed use on a large screen. The M30s' features include Bixby (although the Bixby button is not present), Google Assistant, Samsung Health, and Samsung Pay.

== Reception ==
=== Critical reception ===
The phone received generally positive reviews from critics, with its camera receiving most criticism. NDTV gave the phone a score of 8/10, praising the battery, display, and performance, while criticizing the camera. Android Authority gave the phone a score of 8.2/10, praising the display, audio quality, and performance, while also criticizing the camera and the phone heating up during heavy usage periods. The Mobile Indian also positively described the display, battery, and performance, while negatively describing the camera's low light performance and plastic back design. Finally, Business Standard India positively described the general aspects of the phone including the battery, while criticizing the camera.

=== Issues ===
Many users reported Samsung devices using the Exynos 9611 SoC often freezes and restarts automatically after upgrading or updating to a newer Android version, being the Galaxy M30s as the most affected. Some users reported that the phone faces issues regarding connecting to LTE networks. Also, some users reported the phone heating up during heavy usage, which was also criticized by some reviewers.
