= Samsung Galaxy TabPro S =

Windows 10-powered laptop by Samsung

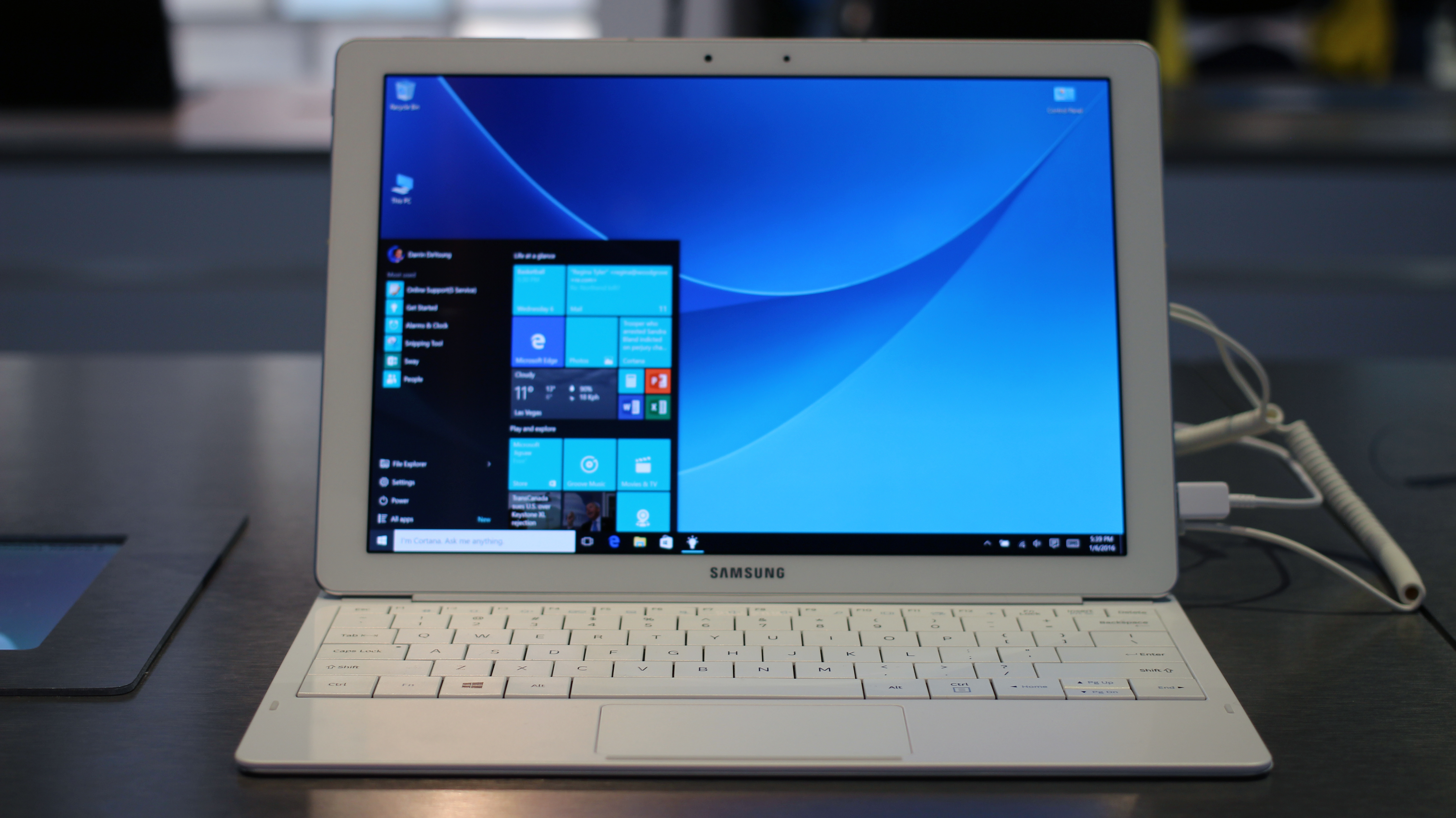
- Samsung Galaxy TabPro S in White
- Also known as: SM-W700 (Wi-Fi, Windows 10 Home); SM-W703 (Wi-Fi, Windows 10 Pro); SM-W707 (4G LTE, Windows 10 Home); SM-W708, SM-W708Y (4G LTE, Windows 10 Pro)
- Manufacturer: Samsung Electronics
- Type: 2-in-1 PC
- Released: March 18, 2016 (US)
- Introductory price: $899.99 (US)
- Operating system: Windows 10
- CPU: Intel Core m3-6Y30 (4MB cache, up to 2.2 GHz)
- Memory: 4 GB DDR3L SDRAM 8GB in Gold version
- Storage: 128GB or 256GB SSD (Solid-state drive)
- Display: 2160x1440 px, (216.33 ppi), 12 in (304.8 mm) diagonal, FHD+ Super AMOLED display (S-Stripe RGB)
- Graphics: Intel HD Graphics 515
- Sound: Built-in Stereo
- Input: Multi-touch touchscreen, Accelerometer, Hall Sensor, Ambient, Light Sensor, Galaxy TabPro Pen (Stylus)
- Camera: 5MP front-facing camera, 5MP rear-facing camera
- Connectivity: Wi-Fi 802.11 a/b/g/n/ac MIMO, Wi-Fi Direct, NFC, Bluetooth 4.1
- Power: 5,200 mAh battery
- Dimensions: 290.3x198.8x6.3mm
- Weight: 693 grams
- Website: http://www.samsung.com/global/galaxy/galaxy-tab-pro-s/

The Samsung Galaxy TabPro S is a 12-inch Windows 10-based 2-in-1 PC produced and marketed by Samsung Electronics. It came in a standard version and a Gold version. The TabPro S marked the first device in the Samsung Galaxy series to run Microsoft Windows, making it a departure from the traditionally Android-powered Galaxy lineup and marked the end of the Samsung Ativ brand. Unveiled at Consumer Electronics Show 2016, alongside Samsung Notebook 9, the TabPro S was released on March 18, 2016.

== Features ==
The tablet has a first-party keyboard attachment included. It is a folio keyboard, which means it can be in two different positions depending how the stand is set up. When closed, it has a leather-like texture to protect from normal wear and tear when traveling.

The USB Type-C Multi-port Adapter now integrates with USB-A 3.1 Port, HDMI Port and USB-C Port. It has a 128 GB solid-state drive (256 GB in the Gold version) and 4 GB RAM (8 GB in the Gold version).

The Galaxy TabPro Pen (not to be confused with the S-Pen, the traditional Samsung stylus) is a digital stylus pen that works as an input device for this Tablet. It features 1024 pressure levels. It can be seamlessly paired via Bluetooth. It uses rechargeable battery instead of disposable AAAA battery, which allows the digital stylus pen's battery to be recharged via Micro USB 2.0 Port. the initial charge last up to 30 days.

Samsung Flow is the fingerprint access application. It can also be paired with a phone via Bluetooth and NFC tag. With this, users can unlock the tablet with their phone's fingerprint sensor.

Although the Samsung Galaxy Book was unveiled at MWC 2017, and features several improvements over the TabPro S model, it is not considered a direct successor.

== See also ==
- Samsung Galaxy Tab Pro
- Samsung Galaxy Book

Preceded by -	Samsung Galaxy TabPro S 2016	Succeeded by None, latest model
