= Samsung Galaxy F62 =

Android smartphone manufactured by Samsung Electronics

- Brand: Samsung
- Manufacturer: Samsung Electronics
- Series: Galaxy F series
- Availability by region: India: 15 February 2021; 5 years ago Malaysia: 3 March 2021; 5 years ago
- Compatible networks: 2G; 3G; 4G
- Dimensions: 163.9 mm (6.45 in) H 76.3 mm (3.00 in) W 9.5 mm (0.37 in) D
- Weight: 218 g (7.7 oz)
- Operating system: Original: Android 11, One UI 3.1; Current: Android 13, One UI 5.1
- System-on-chip: Exynos 9825
- CPU: Octa-core CPU (2x 2.73 GHz Samsung M4 + 2x 2.4 GHz ARM Cortex-A75 + 4x 1.95 GHz ARM Cortex-A55)
- GPU: ARM Mali G76-MP12
- Memory: 6 or 8 GB RAM
- Storage: 128 GB
- Removable storage: microSD card support up to 1 TB
- Battery: 7000 mAh
- Charging: 25W fast charging
- Rear camera: Quad-camera setup: 64 MP main camera (Sony IMX682); 12 MP ultrawide camera (123° field of view); 5 MP macro camera 5 MP depth sensor LED flash, autofocus, hyperlapse, night hyperlapse, night mode, slow-mo, super-steady mode 1080p and 4K video recording at 30 fps
- Front camera: 32 MP; 1080p and 4K video recording at 30 fps, slow-mo
- Display: 6.7 in (170 mm) Super AMOLED Plus (1080x2400 pixels resolution, 20:9 aspect ratio, 393 ppi pixel density, 420 nits maximum brightness)
- Connectivity: Wi-Fi 802.11 a/b/g/n/ac USB-C; 3.5 mm audio jack
- Model: SM-E625FZGDINS
- SAR: 0.739 W/kg (Head)
- Website: www.samsung.com/in/microsite/galaxy-f62/

The Samsung Galaxy F62 (also known as Samsung Galaxy M62) is a mid-range Android smartphone manufactured by Samsung Electronics as part of its Galaxy F series. It is the second phone to be released in the series. It has a 7000 mAh battery, a quad camera setup with a 64 MP main camera, as well as a 12 MP ultrawide camera, a 5 MP macro camera and a 5 MP depth sensor, a 6.7 in (17 cm) Super AMOLED Plus display and the Exynos 9825 SoC previously used in the Samsung Galaxy Note 10 and Note 10+ flagship smartphones.

== Specifications ==
=== Design ===
Samsung Galaxy F62 features a very similar design to the Samsung Galaxy A71 and Samsung Galaxy M51. It has a 6.7-inch Infinity-O Display with a cutout for the front facing camera. The frame and the back panel is made of plastic. It has a side-mounted capacitive fingerprint reader that doubles as the power button at the right alongside the volume rocker. There is a SIM card and microSD card tray at the left. It measures 163.9 × 76.3 × 9.5 mm and weighs 218 grams. It has a quad rear camera setup at the back. It is available in Laser Green, Laser Grey and Laser Blue.

=== Hardware ===
Samsung Galaxy F62 is powered by Samsung's in-house Exynos 9825 SoC with 7 nm EUV process, an octa-core CPU comprising the highest performance cluster with 2×2.73 GHz Samsung Galaxy M4 fourth generation custom cores, a high-performance cluster with 2×2.4 GHz Cortex-A75 cores and a high efficiency cluster with 4x 1.95 GHz Cortex-A55 cores, Mali G76-MP12 GPU and an NPU for AI tasks. It has a 6.7-inch Super AMOLED display with 20:9 aspect ratio, 1080×2400 pixels resolution, 420 nits of maximum brightness and 393 ppi pixel density. It has a 7000 mAh non-removable battery with 25W fast charging support and the phone ships with a 25W charger. Furthermore, it is available with 6 or 8 GB RAM and 128 GB internal storage expandable via dedicated microSD card slot up to 1 TB.

==== Camera ====
Samsung Galaxy F62 has a quad rear camera setup with a 64 MP Sony IMX682 main camera, a 12 MP ultrawide camera with 123° FoV, a 5 MP macro camera and a 5 MP depth sensor. There is a 32 MP camera in the front for selfies. The phone supports night mode, night hyperlapse and super-steady and slow-mo modes. Both main camera and selfie camera supports 4K video recording. Selfie camera supports slow-mo as well.

=== Software ===
Samsung Galaxy F62 is shipped with Android 11 and One UI 3.1. It supports Secure Folder, AltZLife, Samsung Knox (version 3.7) and Samsung Pay.

The Galaxy F62 can also be upgradable up to Android 13, One UI 5.1.

== Release ==
On 8 February 2021, Samsung India announced via its official Instagram page that the device will be announced on 15 February 2021. On 15 February 2021, Samsung Galaxy F62 was announced in India with 6 or 8 GB RAM and 128 GB internal storage. 6 GB model costs INR 23.999 and 8 GB model costs INR 25.999.

On 3 March 2021, Samsung Galaxy F62 was launched in Malaysia as Samsung Galaxy M62. However, Laser Green color option isn't available.
