= Samsung Galaxy A60 =

2019 mid-range smartphones by Samsung Electronics

Samsung Galaxy A60 Samsung Galaxy M40
- Brand: Samsung
- Manufacturer: Samsung Electronics
- Type: Smartphone
- Series: Galaxy A/Galaxy M
- Family: Samsung Galaxy
- First released: A60: June 2019; 7 years ago M40: June 18, 2019; 7 years ago
- Availability by region: A60: June 2019; 7 years ago M40: June 18, 2019; 7 years ago
- Predecessor: Samsung Galaxy A8s
- Successor: Samsung Galaxy A42 5G; Samsung Galaxy M42 5G
- Related: Samsung Galaxy S10; Samsung Galaxy Note 10; Samsung Galaxy A10; Samsung Galaxy A20; Samsung Galaxy A30; Samsung Galaxy A40; Samsung Galaxy A50; Samsung Galaxy A70; Samsung Galaxy A80; Samsung Galaxy A90 5G
- Compatible networks: 2G, 3G, 4G, LTE
- Form factor: Slate
- Dimensions: 155.3 mm (6.11 in) H 73.9 mm (2.91 in) W 7.9 mm (0.31 in) D
- Weight: 168 g (5.9 oz)
- Operating system: Original: Android 9 "Pie" with One UI 1.1; Current: Android 11 with One UI 3.1
- System-on-chip: Qualcomm Snapdragon 675
- CPU: Octa core 2.0 GHz Kryo 460 Gold and 1.7 GHz Kryo 460 Silver
- GPU: Adreno 612 GPU
- Memory: 4GB, 6GB RAM
- Storage: 64GB, 128GB
- Battery: 3500 mAh
- Rear camera: 32 MP, f/1.7, 26mm (wide), 1/2.8", 0.8 μm, PDAF; 8 MP, f/2.2, 12mm (ultrawide), 1/4.0", 1.12 μm, PDAF; 5 MP, f/2.2, (depth); LED flash, panorama, HDR; 4K@30fps, 1080p@30fps
- Front camera: 16 MP, f/2.0, 26mm (wide), 1/3.06", 1.0 μm 1080p@30fps
- Display: 6.3 in (160 mm); 1080 x 2340 pixels, 19.5:9 ratio (~409 ppi density)
- Sound: Loudspeaker
- Connectivity: Wi-Fi 802.11 a/b/g/n/ac, dual-band, Wi-Fi Direct, hotspot Bluetooth 5.0, A2DP, LE; A-GPS, GLONASS, GALILEO, BDS; NFC for Samsung Pay
- Model: A60: SM-A605FN/DS; M40: SM-M405F/DS
- SAR: 0.27 W/kg (head); 1.17 W/kg (body)
- Website: Galaxy M40

The Samsung Galaxy A60 and Samsung Galaxy M40 are mid-range Android-based smartphones manufactured, developed and designed by Samsung Electronics as part of its fifth-generation Galaxy A series lineup and first-generation Galaxy M series lineup. Both devices are identical in terms of hardware and software. The A60 is marketed for China, Hong Kong, and Taiwan, while the M40 is marketed for India and other nearby countries. The A60 was unveiled on April 17, 2019, while the M40 was unveiled on June 11, 2019.

== Specifications ==
=== Design ===
Both devices feature plastic back, plastic frame, and a glass front (which is protected with Corning Gorilla Glass 3).

Galaxy A60	Galaxy M40
Daybreak Black; Seawater Blue; Gradient Red; Cocktail Orange; Peach Mist	Midnight Blue; Seawater Blue; Cocktail Orange

=== Hardware ===
==== Display ====
Both devices have a 6.3-inch FHD+ (1080×2340) PLS-TFT Infinity-O Display with a punch-hole cutout for the front camera (similar to the Galaxy S10), a first in the Galaxy A/M series.

==== Battery ====
Both devices feature a 3500 mAh battery with support for 15 W charging using Qualcomm Quick Charge 2.0 over USB-C.

==== Processor and memory ====
Both devices use the Qualcomm Snapdragon 675 SoC, and are sold in 4 GB or 6 GB RAM versions, and have 64 GB or 128 GB of internal storage that is expandable to 512 GB via the microSD card slot.

==== Camera ====
The phones have a triple-lens camera consisting of a 32 MP f/1.7 wide-angle lens, 8 MP f/2.2 ultra-wide angle lens, and a 5 MP depth sensor. It has a 16 MP f/2.0 selfie camera.

=== Software ===
Both devices were shipped with Android 9 Pie and One UI 1.0. It was eligible for 2 OS upgrades and 4 years of security updates (until 2023).

	Pre-installed OS	OS Upgrades history		End of support
	Pre-installed OS	1st	2nd	End of support
A60	Android 9 Pie (One UI 1.0)	Android 10 (One UI 2.0); April 2020	Android 11 (One UI 3.1); April 2021	Around 2023
M40	Android 9 Pie (One UI 1.0)	Android 10 (One UI 2.0); March 2020	Android 11 (One UI 3.1); April 2021	Around 2023

== Reception ==
The A60 and M40 received mixed reviews. SamMobile praised the design, performance and battery life, but lamented the lack of a 3.5 mm headphone jack and the usage of an LCD panel rather than an AMOLED while criticizing the price, concluding that the M40 "is a phone that shouldn't really exist" as a higher priced alternative to the A50. It also noted that the video recording was a strong point along with the ultra-wide lens, but the cameras struggled in low-light. The software was criticized for lacking features as well. GSMArena gave both a 3.3/5, having similar complaints about the camera and display.
