= Samsung Galaxy M31 =

Samsung smartphone announced in March 2020

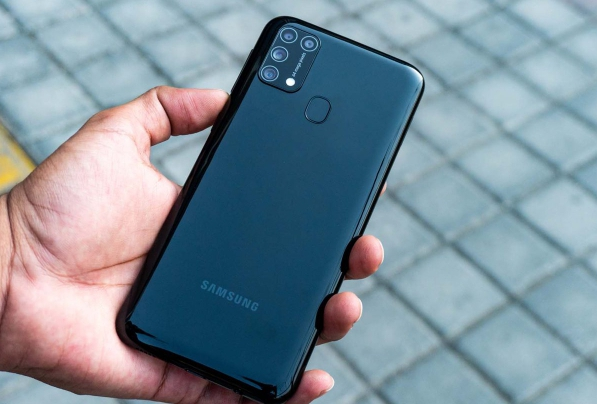
- Brand: Samsung Galaxy
- Manufacturer: Samsung Electronics
- Type: Smartphone
- Series: Galaxy M
- First released: March 5, 2020; 6 years ago
- Predecessor: Samsung Galaxy M30
- Successor: Samsung Galaxy M32
- Related: Samsung Galaxy M30s; Samsung Galaxy M31s
- Form factor: Slate
- Colors: Ocean Blue, Space Black, Red
- Weight: 191 g (6.7 oz)
- Operating system: Original: Android 10, One UI 2 Current: Android 12, One UI 4.1
- System-on-chip: Exynos 7 Octa 9611 (10nm Samsung 10LPE)
- CPU: Octa-core (4x2.3 GHz ARM Cortex-A73 & 4x1.7 GHz Cortex-A53)
- GPU: ARM Mali-G72 MP3
- Modem: Shannon 337 LTE
- Memory: 6 or 8 GB RAM
- Storage: 64 or 128 GB
- Removable storage: microSD card support (dedicated slot)
- SIM: Nano-SIM, Dedicated Slot, DSDS
- Battery: 5830 mAh battery Lithium polymer (non-removable)
- Charging: 15W Samsung Fast Charging
- Rear camera: Quad camera setup: 64 MP main camera Samsung ISOCELL GW1; 8 MP wide-angle camera 5 MP macro camera 5 MP depth sensor Other features: LED flash 4K 60fps video recording Night mode
- Front camera: 32 MP, 4K 30fps video recording
- Display: 6.4 in (16 cm) Super AMOLED 1080 x 2340 pixels, 19.5:9 ratio (~403 ppi density)
- Sound: Mono Loudspeaker, Dolby Atmos, 3.5mm stereo audio jack
- Connectivity: Wi-Fi; Wi-Fi Direct; Wi-Fi Hotspot; Bluetooth 5.0; NFC
- Data inputs: Touch Screen, Power Button, Volume Rocker, Fingerprint reader, Depth sensor
- Model: SM-M315F
- Codename: m315f
- SAR: 0.52 W/kg (head); 0.69 W/kg (body) (EU); 0.48 W/kg (head); 1.13 W/kg (body)
- Website: www.samsung.com/in/smartphones/galaxy-m/galaxy-m31-blue-64gb-sm-m315fzbdins/

The Samsung Galaxy M31 is an Android-based smartphone manufactured by Samsung Electronics as part of the Galaxy M series. It was unveiled on 25 February 2020. Its key features include a 6.4 inch Super AMOLED display, a quad-camera setup and a 6000 mAh battery.

== Specifications ==
=== Design ===
The Samsung Galaxy M31 has a plastic unibody design with a glossy gradient finish. On the side frame; there is a power button and a volume rocker at the right, there is a SIM card/microSD card tray at the left, and there is a 3.5 mm headphone jack, a USB-C port, a microphone and a speaker at the bottom. The rear camera setup paired with an LED flash and the capacitive fingerprint reader are located at the back.

The phone has a 6.4 inch Infinity-U display with a U-shaped notch for the front-facing camera and a sizable bottom bezel.

The phone measures 159.2 mm x 75.1 mm x 8.9 mm and weighs 191 grams. It is available in Ocean Blue, Space Black and Red.

=== Hardware ===
The Samsung Galaxy M31 has a 6.4 inch Super AMOLED display with 1080×2340 pixels resolution,60 Hertz, 19.5:9 aspect ratio and ~403 ppi pixel density. It is powered by Exynos 9611 system-on-chip with an octa-core (4x2.3 GHz Cortex-A73 & 4x1.7 GHz Cortex-A53) CPU and ARM Mali-G72 MP3 GPU. It comes with either 6 GB or 8 GB RAM and 64 GB or 128 GB internal storage. It has a 6000 mAh non-removable lithium polymer (Li-Po) battery with 15 W fast charging.

==== Cameras ====
The Samsung Galaxy M31 has a quad-camera setup with a 64 MP main camera, an 8 MP wide-angle camera, a 5 MP macro camera and a 5 MP depth sensor. It also has a 32 MP front-facing camera. Both the front-facing camera and the main camera can record 4K video at 30 fps.

=== Software ===
The Samsung Galaxy M31 comes Android 10 with One UI 2.preinstalled. The phone also received One UI 2.1 and One UI 2.5 user interface updates before getting a Android version update. It was then revealed that the Samsung Galaxy M31 was eligible for Android 11 version update. On 19 January 2021, the phone started receiving Android 11 update with One UI 3 user interface. The phone then received an update for One UI 3.1 user interface in March 2021. In April 2022, the phone started receiving the Android 12 update with One UI 4.1, being the last user interface update it will get.

== See also ==
- Samsung Galaxy M30s
- Samsung Galaxy M series
- One UI
