= Samsung Galaxy S4 Active =

2013 mid-range rugged smartphone by Samsung Electronics

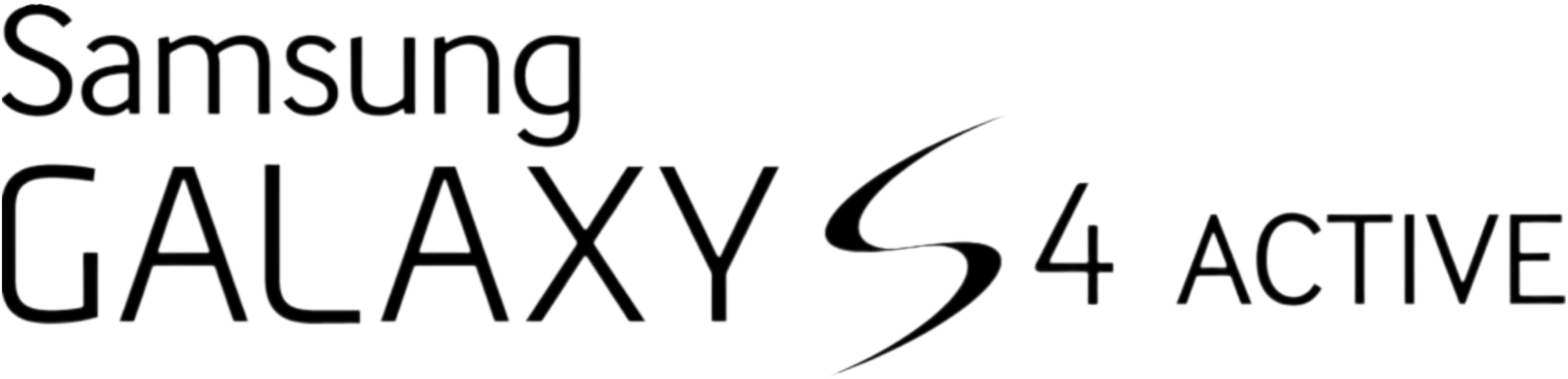

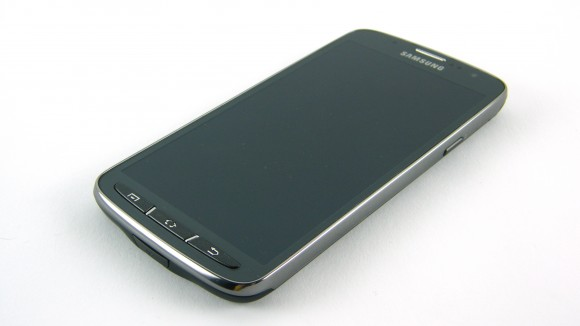
- Galaxy S4 Active
- Brand: Samsung
- Manufacturer: Samsung Electronics
- Type: Rugged smartphone
- Series: Galaxy S
- Family: Samsung Galaxy
- First released: June 21, 2013; 13 years ago
- Availability by region: June 21, 2013; 13 years ago (USA); July 4, 2013; 13 years ago (Hong Kong, Netherlands, Russia, Sweden); July 17, 2013; 13 years ago (India, Taiwan); July 18, 2013; 13 years ago (Malaysia); September 18, 2013; 13 years ago (Japan)
- Predecessor: Samsung Galaxy Xcover 2
- Successor: Samsung Galaxy S5 Active
- Related: Samsung Galaxy S4; Samsung Galaxy S4 Mini; Samsung Galaxy S4 Zoom; Samsung Galaxy Note 3 Samsung Galaxy Note 3 Neo; Samsung Galaxy Xcover 2
- Compatible networks: UMTS HSPA+ 900 (Band VIII), 2100 (Band I) MHz (not available in all markets); UMTS HSPA+ 850 (Band V), 1700 (Band IV), 1900 (Band II), 2100 (Band I) (not available in all markets) GSM GPRS/EDGE 850, 900, 1800, 1900 MHz, LTE Cat 3 (Global LTE), LTE Cat 4 (South Korea)
- Form factor: Slate
- Dimensions: 5.5 in (140 mm) H 2.80 in (71 mm) W 0.35 in (8.9 mm) D
- Weight: 5.39 oz (153 g)
- Operating system: Original: Android 4.2.2 "Jelly Bean" with TouchWiz Nature UX 2.0; Current: Android 5.0.1 "Lollipop" with TouchWiz Nature UX 4.0
- System-on-chip: Qualcomm Snapdragon 600 APQ8064 processor(Global); Qualcomm Snapdragon 800 MSM8974 Processor(South Korea)
- CPU: 1.9 GHz Qualcomm Quad Core(Global); Qualcomm Krait 400 MP4 2.3 GHz (South Korea)
- GPU: Adreno 320(Global); Adreno 330 550 MHz(South Korea)
- Memory: 2 GB RAM
- Storage: 16 GB(Global), 32 GB(South Korea)
- Removable storage: up to 64 GB microSDHC (officially) up to 64 GB microSDXC (unofficially)
- Battery: 2,600 mAh 13 hours talk time, 520 standby, removable
- Rear camera: 8 MP (Global), 13 MP(South Korea) IMX135 Exmor RS back-side illuminated sensor with LED flash 1080p video recording @ 30 frames/s 16x Digital Zoom
- Front camera: 2 MP
- Display: 5 in (130 mm) diagonal TFT; 1920x1080 px (~440 ppi) and Sony BRAVIA Engine 2 with scratch-resistant and shatterproof glass
- Connectivity: 4G LTE(100 Mbit/s) LTE (Bands 1, 3, 5, 7, 8, 20); GPS; GLONASS; Micro USB 2.0; Bluetooth 4.0; NFC; UMTS HSPA+ (Bands 1, 3, 5, 8 or bands 1, 2, 4, 5, 8); Wi-Fi (802.11 ac/a/b/g/n); DLNA; GSM GPRS/EDGE 850, 900, 1800, 1900 MHz; MHL
- Data inputs: Multi-touch capacitive touchscreen proximity sensor
- Water resistance: IP67
- Codename: Fortius

The Samsung Galaxy S4 Active is an Android-based mid-range smartphone manufactured, designed and produced by Samsung Electronics as part of its Galaxy S series. It was announced on June 5, 2013, and released on June 21, 2013. As a variant of the flagship Samsung Galaxy S4, the S4 Active contains similar specifications, but it also features water and dustproofing designed around the IP67 specifications, along with a more rugged design.

The Galaxy S4 Active was preceded by the Galaxy Xcover 2 indirectly and succeeded by the Galaxy S5 Active directly.

== Release ==
The S4 Active was first released in the United States by AT&T on June 21, 2013 in "Dive Blue" and "Urban Gray" colors, its model number is SGH-i537. An international version of the S4 Active was released in Q3 2013, its model number is GT-I9295.

== Specifications ==
The S4 Active inherits most of its hardware components from the S4, including an identical Snapdragon 600 quad-core processor, 2 GB of RAM, and a 5-inch 1080p display. However, its display is a TFT LCD and uses Gorilla Glass 2 instead of the S4's Super AMOLED and Gorilla Glass 3, and the S4 Active uses an 8 megapixel rear camera instead of the 13 rear megapixel camera of the S4. Its hardware design is similar to the S4, except it is slightly thicker, has metallic rivets, includes flaps to cover ports when not in use, and uses three physical navigation keys instead of a physical home key and capacitive back/menu keys like the S4. The S4 Active is designed towards the IP67 specifications, meaning that it can withstand up to 30 minutes underwater at a maximum depth of 1 meter (3.3 feet), and is also resistant to dust. The S4 Active launched with similar software to the S4, Android 4.2.2 "Jelly Bean" with TouchWiz Nature UX 2.0. Its camera software replaces the "Dual Shot" mode with an "Aqua Mode" designed for taking photos underwater, which disables the touchscreen and uses the volume keys as a shutter.

An update to Android 4.4.2 "KitKat" was released for the AT&T model in April 2014, although the deployment was temporarily halted until June 2014 due to technical issues. International version received its KitKat update in late May 2014. In April 2015, the S4 Active was updated to Android 5.0.1 "Lollipop".

== Reception ==
Engadget was positive in its review of the S4 Active, noting that the S4 Active had a more "high-end" appearance than the normal S4, had a more comfortable feel due to its thicker build, and that its buttons were "definitely superior" from a usability standpoint. However, regressions from the S4 were also noted, such as its lower display quality in comparison to the Super AMOLED.

== See also ==
- Samsung Electronics
- Samsung Galaxy
- Samsung Galaxy S series
- Samsung Galaxy Xcover series
- Samsung Rugby Smart
