= Samsung Galaxy S4 Zoom =

2013 compact digital camera and smartphone combo model by Samsung

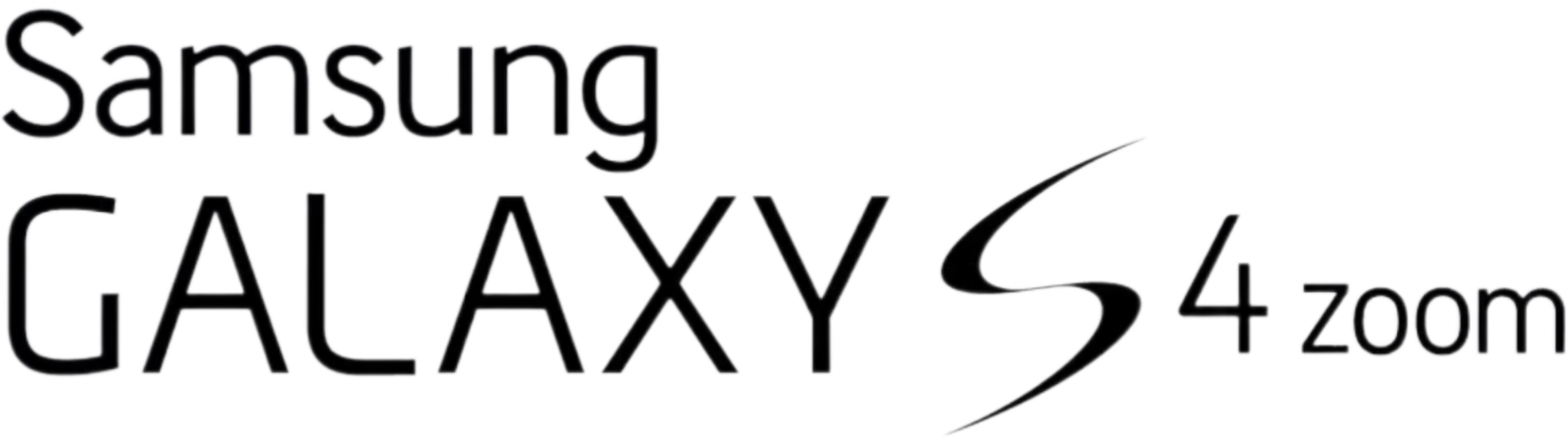

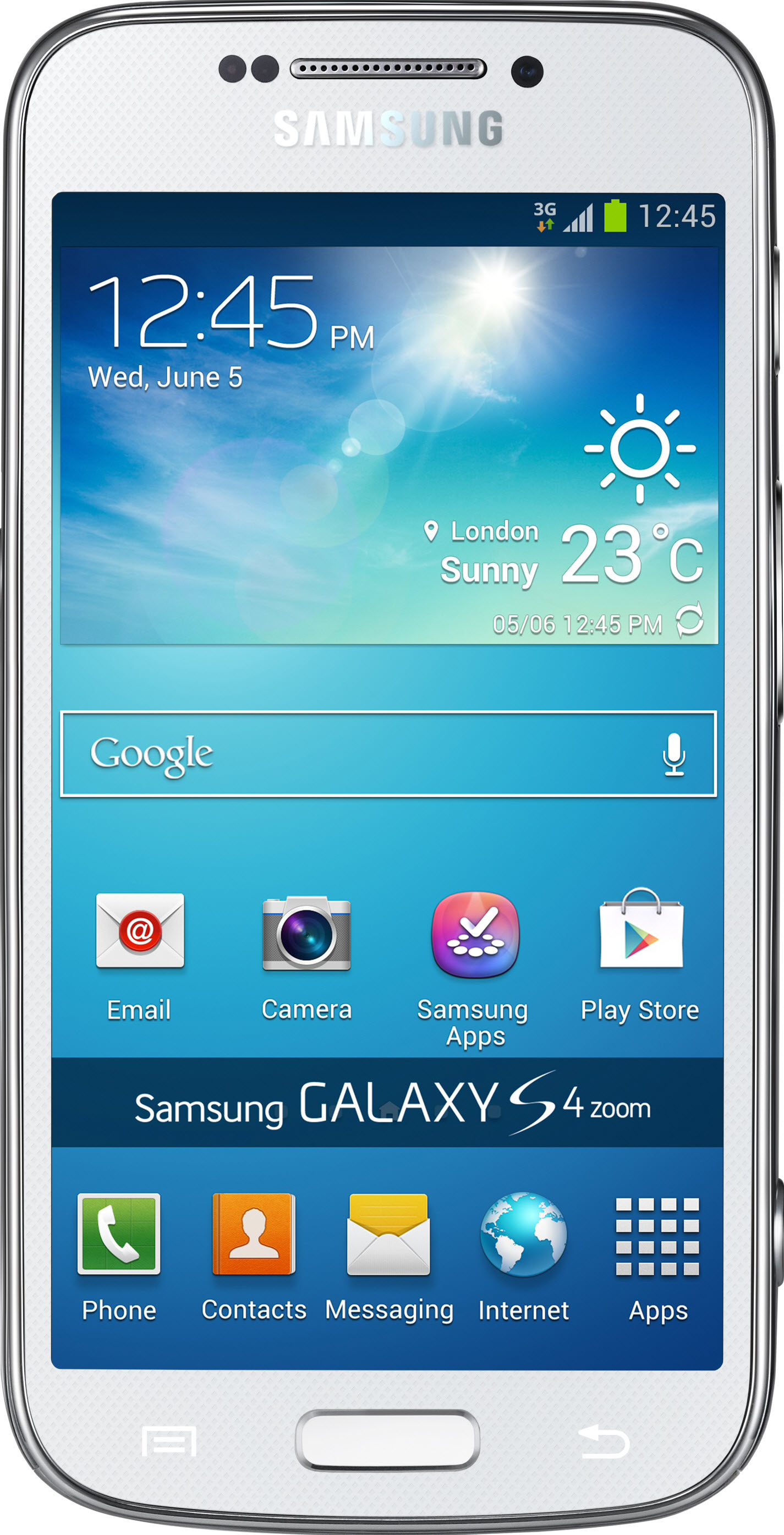
- Samsung Galaxy S4 Zoom
- Brand: Samsung
- Manufacturer: Samsung Electronics
- Type: Smartphone
- Series: Galaxy S
- Family: Samsung Galaxy
- First released: July 8, 2013; 13 years ago
- Availability by region: United Kingdom July 8, 2013; 13 years ago
- Discontinued: 2014; 12 years ago
- Predecessor: Samsung Galaxy Camera
- Successor: Samsung Galaxy K Zoom
- Related: Samsung Galaxy S4; Samsung Galaxy S4 Active; Samsung Galaxy S4 Mini; Samsung Galaxy Note 3 Samsung Galaxy Camera 2 Samsung Galaxy NX
- Compatible networks: 2G / 3G / 4G LTE
- Form factor: Slate
- Operating system: Original: Android 4.2.2 with TouchWiz Nature UX 2.0
- Model: SM-C101 / SM-C105

The Samsung Galaxy S4 Zoom is an Android-based smartphone with camera hybrid with a 10x optical zoom (24–240 mm 35 mm equivalent) with a f/3.1-6.3 aperture lens, built-in optical image stabilization, and a xenon flash. It was unveiled on June 12, 2013, and released on July 8, 2013.

The phone uses a Exynos 4212 SoC featuring a 1.5 GHz dualcore CPU. There is a base model, SM-C101, and a variant featuring LTE 4G, SM-C105.

== Camera ==
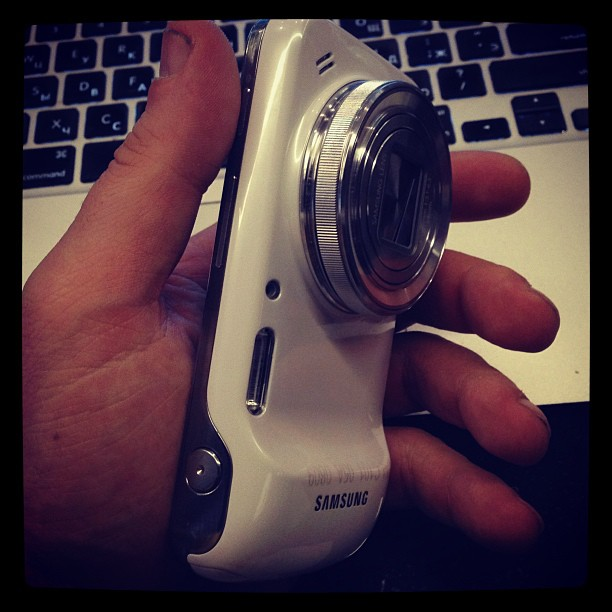
Its zoom lens with rotary knob

The S4 Zoom uses 1/2.33-inch 16 MP BSI-CMOS sensor and has both auto and manual camera control, and takes video in 1080p 30 fps (full HD) or 720p at smoother 60 fps. The device can be categorized as a low/mid-end point-and-shoot camera.

In one of the Scene modes, the user can set the exposure time, the ISO light sensitivity (up to ISO 3200), the aperture and the white balance manually, which the main Galaxy S4 variant lacks.

It can record slow motion videos at 768×512 pixels at 120 frames per second, compared to 800×450 on the main Galaxy S4 and 720×480 on the Galaxy Note 2 at that frame rate. Slow motion video is recorded without audio track. One can also use the optical zoom while recording. While recording video, at any available resolution and frame rate, the optical zoom can optionally be slowed down, to avoid recording the sound of the Zoom Lens Engine. This also applies to the succeeding Galaxy K Zoom.

While recording video, one can also take still images with around 3.2 megapixels, but only up to 6 pictures during the whole recording, no matter the length or the size of the video, even if this video is paused. Samsung has not given a reason for this limit.

The S4 Zoom has a rotary knob ring around the zoom lens that can be used for optical zooming and to launch the camera from a dedicated mode selector. The rotary ring knob can mount some compatible ring lights for macro photography.

== Screen ==
The screen has the same specifications as the S4 Mini, with a qHD (not to be confused with QHD) Display with 960×540 Pixels and a pixel Density of 256 ppi.
It uses Super-AMOLED-Technology, like most of Samsung's mid-range or flagship smartphones. It is protected with Gorilla Glass 3, unlike the Gorilla Glass 2 used on the Galaxy S3, Galaxy Note 2 and Galaxy S4 Active. The Galaxy S4 (main model) has Gorilla Glass 3 as well.

== See also ==
- Comparison of Samsung Galaxy S smartphones
