= Samsung Rugby =

Series of mobile phones

Samsung Rugby is a series of ruggedized mobile phones manufactured by Samsung Telecommunications. The lineup consists of the following:

- Samsung Rugby (SGH-A836) also (SGH-A837) flip phones
- Samsung Rugby II (SGH-A847M), a rugged flip phone
- Samsung Rugby Smart (SGH-i847), a 1.4 GHz Android smartphone for AT&T Mobility
- Samsung Galaxy Rugby (GT-S5690M), the stripped-down Canadian version of the Samsung Rugby Smart for Bell Mobility and Rogers Wireless with an 800 MHz processor
- Samsung Galaxy Rugby Pro (SGH-i547), an LTE capable Android 4.0 phone based on the Rugby Smart, but with a 1.5 GHz processor
- Samsung Galaxy Rugby LTE (SGH-i547C), the Canadian version of the Rugby Pro with a 1.5 GHz processor and LTE support for Telus Mobility and Bell Mobility
- Samsung Rugby 3, a rugged 810G spec flip phone, announced Nov 12th 2012, for AT&T that will be 'Enhanced PTT' capable but will not be 4G enabled
- Samsung Rugby 4 (SM-B780W), an update to the Rugby 3 launched in October 2014, including Wi-Fi connectivity as the main new feature

== See also ==
- Casio G'zOne Commando
- Samsung SGH-A657 (AT&T)
