= Samsung Galaxy Camera =

2012 point-and-shoot camera by Samsung Electronics

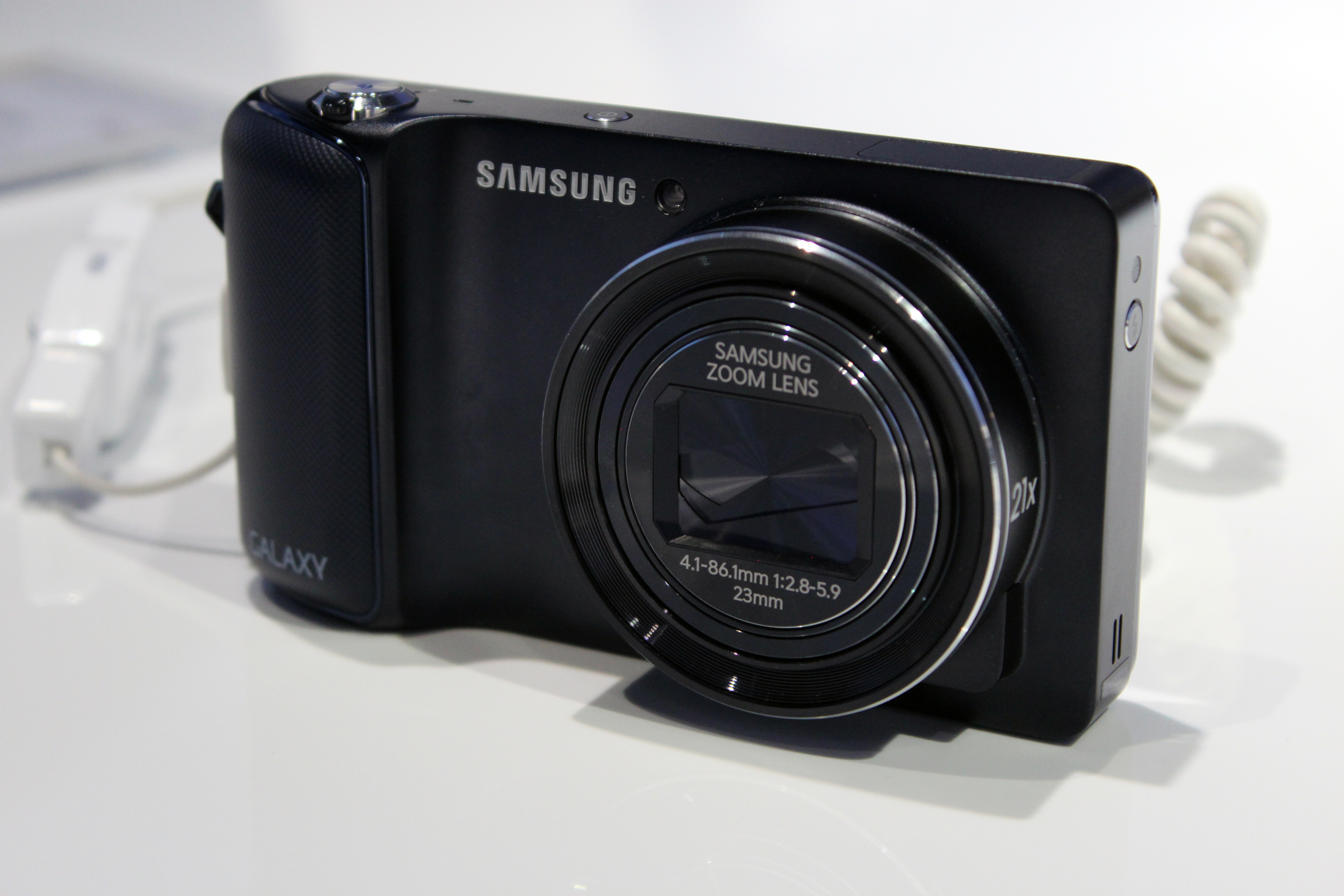

Overview
- Maker: Samsung
- Type: Point-and-shoot, camera
- Released: August 29, 2012; 14 years ago

Lens
- Lens: 4.1-86.1 mm (21x optical zoom)

Sensor/medium
- Sensor: BSI CMOS 1/2.3"
- Maximum resolution: 16 megapixels
- Film speed: ISO 100 to 3200
- Storage media: 8GB, expanded via micro-SD/SDHC/SDXC

Flash
- Flash: Built-in

Shutter
- Shutter speed range: 16 sec to 1/2,000th sec

General
- LCD screen: 4.8" (122 mm) LCD touchscreen, 1280 x 720 pixels
- Battery: 1650 mAh
- Optional battery packs: History
- Dimensions: 70.8×128.7×19.1 mm (2.79×5.07×0.75 in)
- Weight: 300 g (11 oz)

Chronology
- Successor: Samsung Galaxy S4 Zoom

The Samsung Galaxy Camera is a point-and-shoot camera which is an Android-based mobile device manufactured, developed and designed by Samsung Electronics. It was announced alongside the Galaxy Note II at the Samsung Unpacked event on August 29, 2012, with the slogan "Camera. Reborn." The device was officially released on November 8, 2012, with web sales beginning on November 7.

== Specifications ==
The camera features a 16 megapixel CMOS sensor and a 21x optical zoom lens, as well as Wi-Fi and 3G connectivity, and a GPS receiver by which the camera can make geotagged photographs. It runs on Android's 4.1 "Jelly Bean" software and it allows for in-camera organizing, editing and online sharing or storage of images and videos. As with other Android devices, other software can be downloaded from Google Play. However, voice calls cannot be made on the Galaxy Camera. This feature would be provided in its successor, the Samsung Galaxy S4 Zoom.

== Marketing ==
To promote the Galaxy Camera, Samsung released a viral video on their YouTube channel, featuring James Franco demonstrating the camera's features.

== Availability ==
On October 4, 2012, U.S. wireless provider AT&T announced that it would begin to carry the Galaxy Camera through its retail outlets on November 16.

On December 11, 2012, Verizon announced that it would also carry the Galaxy Camera. It was the first 4G LTE camera. The camera was discontinued in 2014.

== Models ==
Although the Galaxy Camera started as a single camera, the branded concept was expanded to include multiple iterations of digital camera, with the Android OS being the unifying feature. As of November 2025, the range of Galaxy Cameras include (and has included):

- Samsung Galaxy Camera
- Samsung Galaxy Camera 2
- Samsung Galaxy NX

== Modifications ==
Members of XDA Developers have added the possibility to boot from an microSD card.

== Gallery ==
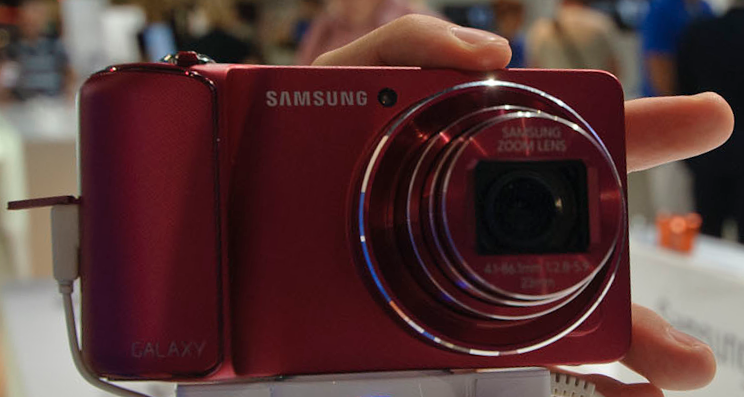
Galaxy Camera in red color

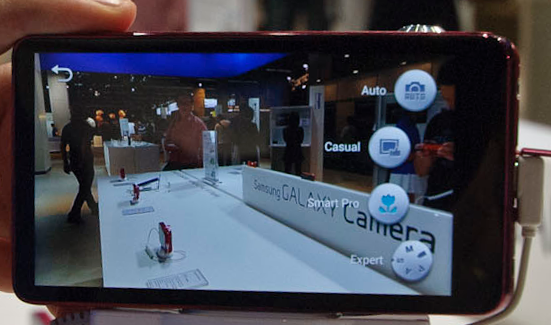
Galaxy Camera screen

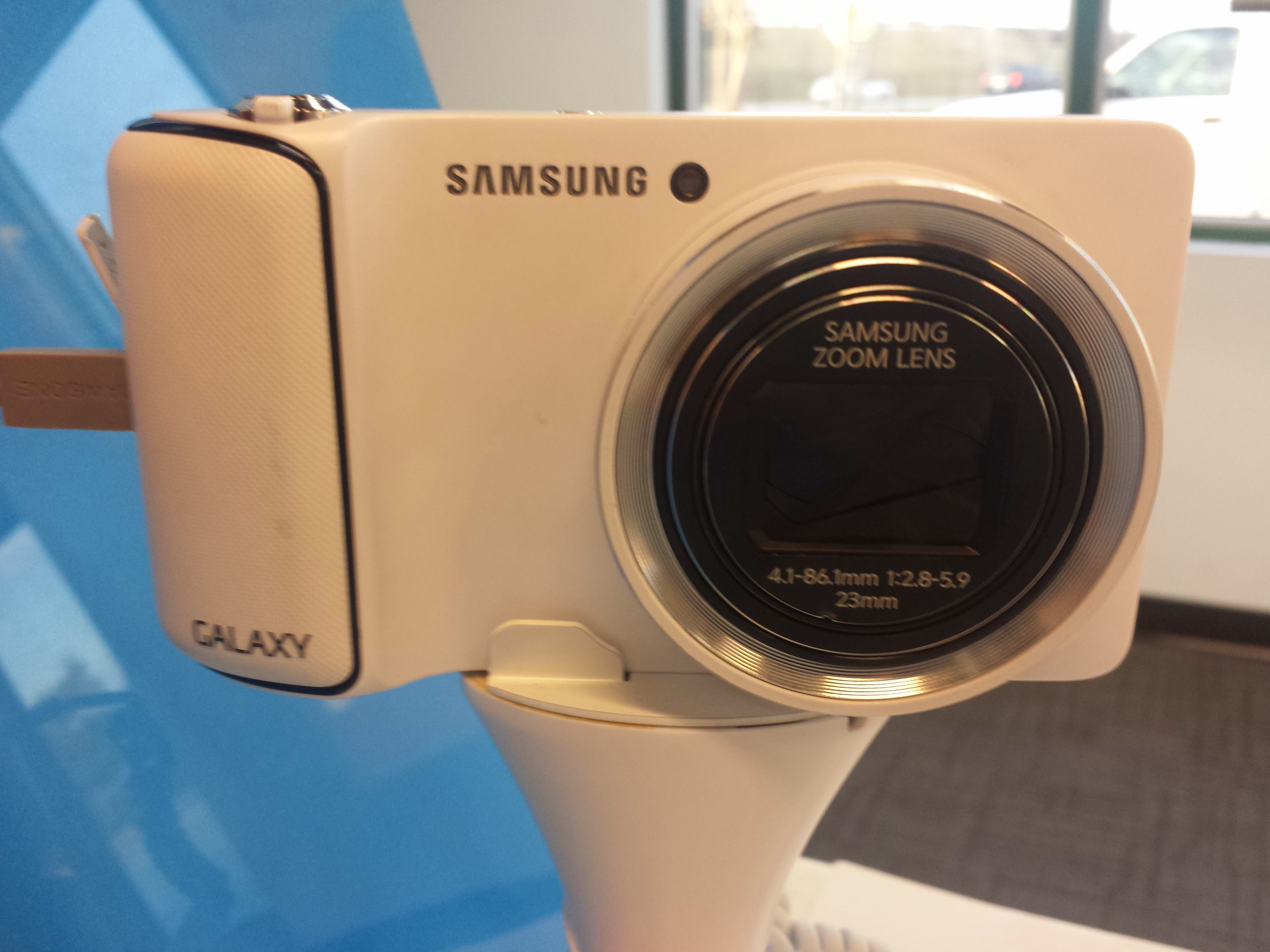
Galaxy Camera in white color

== Reception ==
The concept for the camera was praised, but critics noted poor battery life, high sensor noise, high cost, and lack of integration with third-party apps (Instagram, for example, did not support the optical zoom) as flaws.
