= Samsung Galaxy Xcover =

Smartphone by Samsung

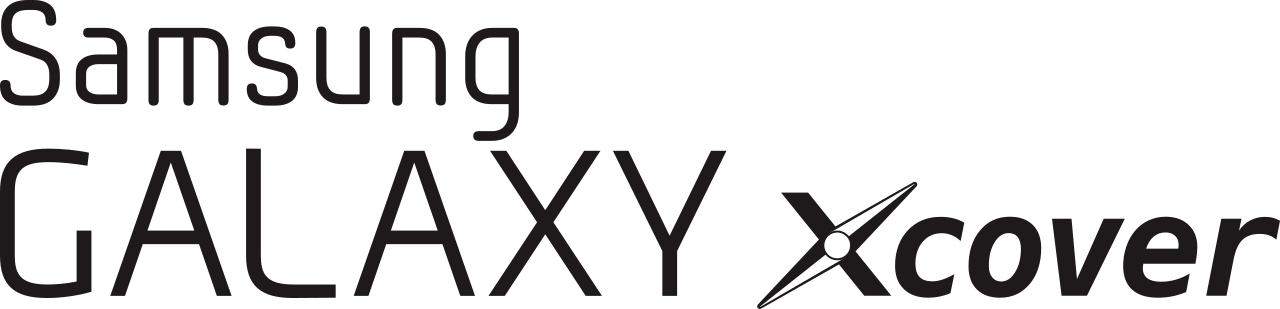

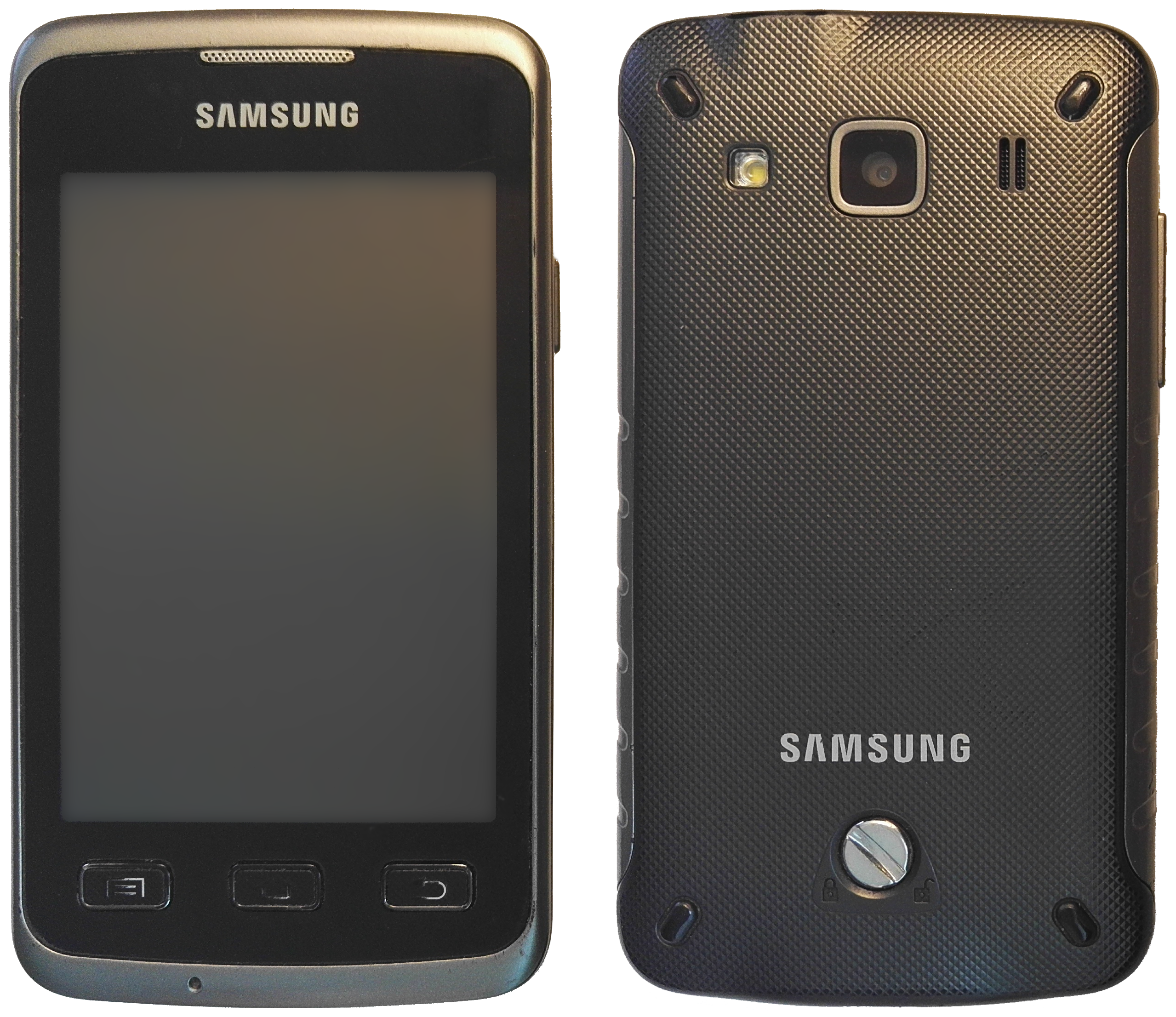
- Brand: Samsung
- Manufacturer: Samsung Electronics
- Type: Smartphone
- Series: Galaxy Xcover
- Family: Samsung Galaxy
- First released: August 1, 2011; 14 years ago
- Successor: Samsung Galaxy Xcover 2
- Compatible networks: 2G EDGE/GPRS (850/900/1800/1900 MHz); 3G HSDPA 900/2100 MHz
- Form factor: Slate
- Dimensions: 121.5 mm (4.78 in) H 65.9 mm (2.59 in) W 12 mm (0.47 in) D
- Weight: 100 g (3.5 oz)
- Operating system: Android 2.3.6 Gingerbread
- CPU: 800 MHz Marvell MG2
- Memory: 512 MB
- Storage: 128 MB
- Removable storage: MicroSD up to 32 GB
- Battery: 1,500 mAh, 3.7 V, Li-ion, user replaceable
- Rear camera: 3.15 Mpx, 2048 x 1536 pixels, 480p video, autofocus, LED flash
- Front camera: None
- Display: 3.65 in (93 mm) (TFT)LCD diagonal 320×480 px 16M colors
- Connectivity: 3.5 mm jack Bluetooth v3.0 with A2DP, EDR; Stereo FM radio with RDS; Micro-USB 2.0; Wi-Fi 802.11 b/g/n, Wi-Fi hotspot
- Data inputs: Multi-touch, capacitive touchscreen Accelerometer; A-GPS; Digital compass Proximity sensor Push buttons
- Water resistance: IP67 water and dust proof
- Model: GT-S5690

The Samsung Galaxy Xcover (GT-S5690) is a water- and dust-proof IP67-rated smartphone manufactured by Samsung Electronics that runs the Android operating system. It was announced and released by Samsung in August 2011. The Galaxy Xcover started the Samsung Galaxy Xcover series, with the immediate successor being the Galaxy Xcover 2.

The Galaxy Xcover 3G smartphone, with quad band GSM. It sports a display of a 3.65 inch LCD capacitive touchscreen with 16M colours (320x480) resolution. It has a 3.15-megapixel camera with LED flash. It comes with a 1500 mAh hotswappable Li-ion battery.

The Galaxy Xcover comes with Android 2.3.6 Gingerbread.

== See also ==
- List of Android smartphones
- Samsung Galaxy
- Samsung i847 Rugby Smart
