= Samsung Galaxy Xcover 3 =

2015 mid-range Android smartphones by Samsung Electronics

Samsung Galaxy Xcover 3 Samsung Galaxy Xcover 3 Value Edition
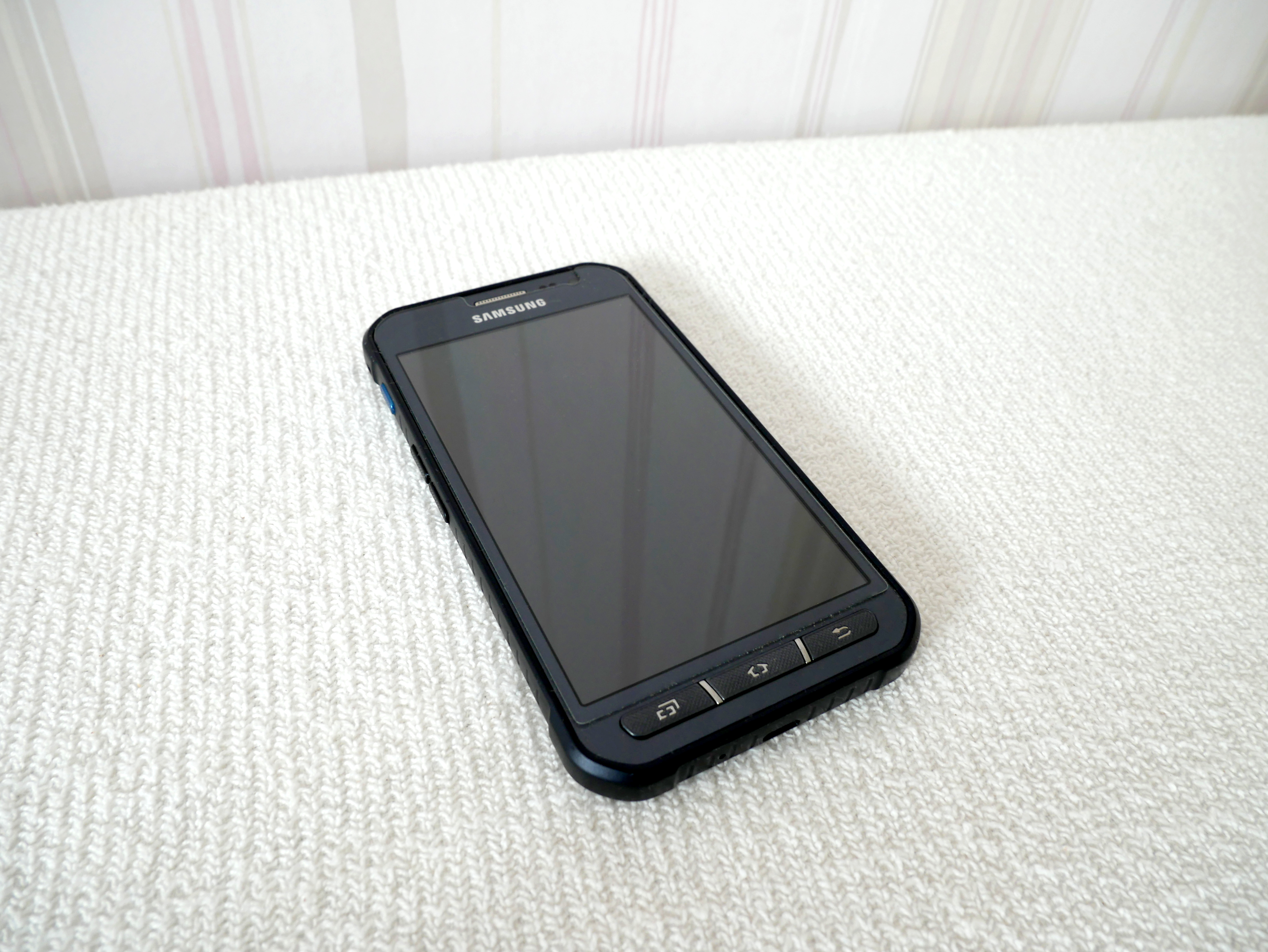
- Brand: Samsung
- Manufacturer: Samsung Electronics
- Type: Touchscreen smartphone
- Series: Galaxy Xcover
- Family: Samsung Galaxy
- First released: April 2015; 11 years ago
- Predecessor: Samsung Galaxy Xcover 2
- Successor: Samsung Galaxy Xcover 4
- Related: Samsung Galaxy S6 Active
- Form factor: Slate
- Dimensions: 132.9 mm (5.23 in) H 70.1 mm (2.76 in) W 10 mm (0.39 in) D
- Weight: 154 g (5.4 oz)
- Operating system: SM-G388: Original: Android 4.4.4 "KitKat" with TouchWiz Nature UX 3.0; Current: Android 5.1.1 "Lollipop" with TouchWiz Noble UX; SM-G389: Android 6.0.1 "Marshmallow" with TouchWiz Hero UX
- System-on-chip: Marvell Armada PXA1908
- CPU: Quad-core 1.2GHz Cortex-A53
- GPU: Vivante GC7000
- Memory: 1.5GB RAM
- Storage: 8 GB
- Removable storage: MicroSD, up to 128 GB
- Battery: 2200 mAh Li-ion battery user replaceable
- Rear camera: 5 MP
- Front camera: 2 MP
- Display: 4.5 inches (110 mm), 480 × 800 pixels (207 ppi) PLS TFT LCD capacitive touchscreen, 16M colors
- Connectivity: USB 2.0, Bluetooth, Wi-Fi, Wi-Fi Direct, GPS Location, NFC
- Water resistance: IP67
- Model: SM-G388, SM-G389
- Website: www.samsung.com/uk/...

The Samsung Galaxy Xcover 3 is a mid-range rugged Android-based smartphone produced and developed by Samsung Electronics, as part of the Galaxy Xcover series and released in April 2015. It is the successor to the Galaxy Xcover 2. The Xcover 3 is waterproof and dustproof designed around the IP67 specifications. Its successor is the Galaxy Xcover 4 in 2017.

== See also ==
- Samsung Galaxy S6 Active
- Samsung i847 Rugby Smart
