= Samsung Galaxy Xcover 7 =

2024 mid-range smartphone by Samsung Electronics

Samsung Galaxy Xcover 7 Samsung Galaxy Xcover 7 Pro
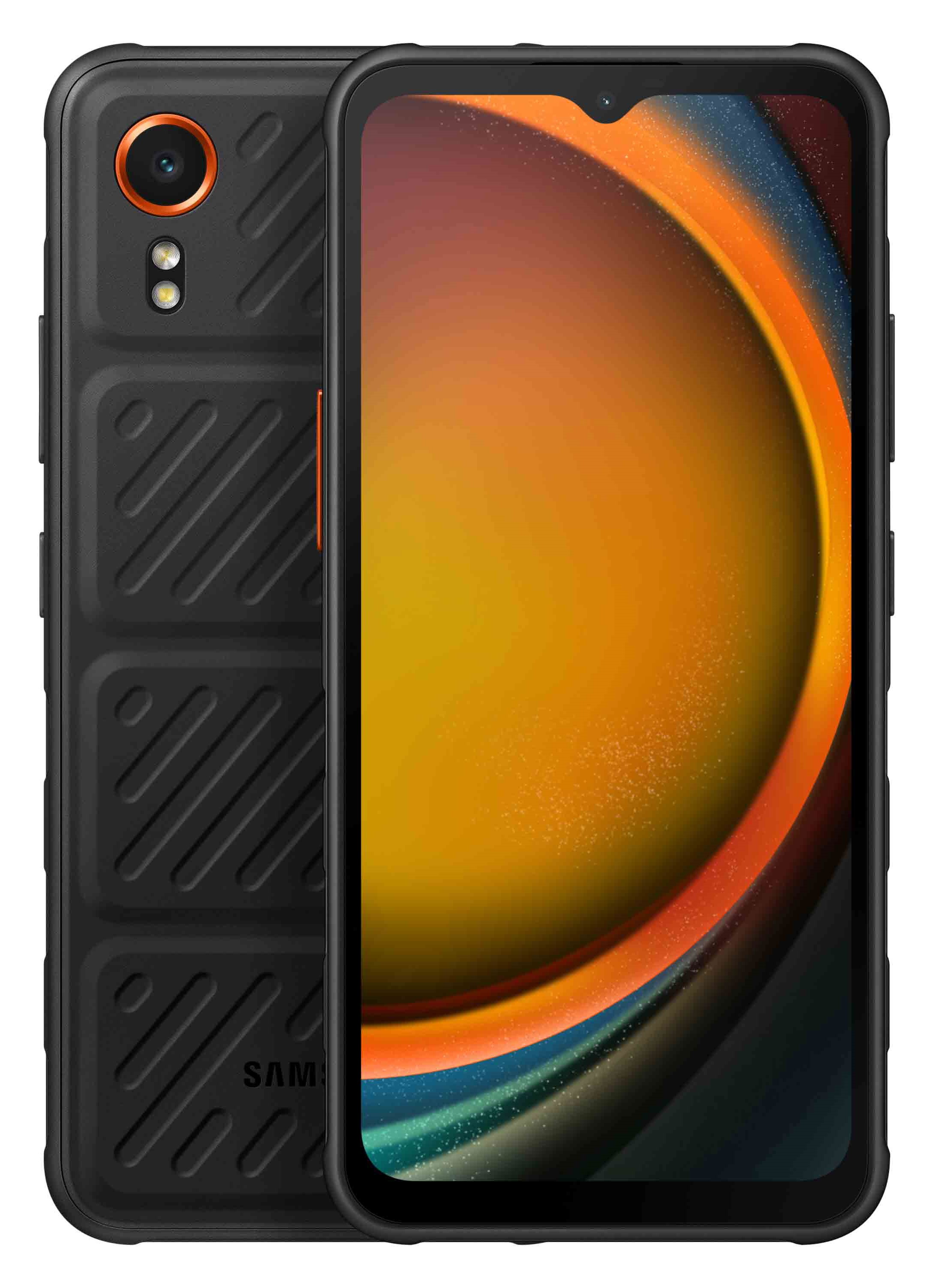
- Samsung Galaxy Xcover 7
- Brand: Samsung
- Manufacturer: Samsung Electronics
- Type: Smartphone
- Series: Galaxy Xcover
- Family: Samsung Galaxy
- First released: Xcover 7: January 23, 2024; 2 years ago Xcover 7 Pro: May 7, 2025; 17 months ago
- Availability by region: Xcover 7: January 23, 2024; 2 years ago Xcover 7 Pro: May 7, 2025; 17 months ago
- Predecessor: Samsung Galaxy Xcover 5 Samsung Galaxy Xcover 6 Pro
- Related: Samsung Galaxy Tab Active 5
- Compatible networks: 2G / 3G / 4G
- Form factor: Slate
- Dimensions: 6.6 in (1049 mm)
- Operating system: Original: Xcover 7: Android 14 with One UI 6.0; Xcover 7 Pro: Android 15 with One UI 7.0; Current: Android 17 with One UI 9.0
- System-on-chip: Xcover 7: Mediatek Dimensity 6100+ Xcover 7 Pro: Qualcomm SM7635 Snapdragon 7s Gen 3
- Memory: Xcover 7: 4GB, 6GB; Xcover 7 Pro: 6GB, 8GB
- Storage: Xcover 7: 64GB, 128GB; Xcover 7 Pro: 128GB, 256GB
- Battery: Xcover 7: 4050 mAh; Xcover 7 Pro: 4350 mAh removable
- Charging: 15W Fast charging
- Rear camera: 50 MP
- Front camera: Xcover 7: 5 MP; Xcover 7 Pro: 13 MP
- Model: Xcover 7: SM-G556; Xcover 7 Pro: SM-G766

The Samsung Galaxy Xcover 7 is a mid-range rugged Android-based smartphone manufactured, developed and designed by Samsung Electronics, alongside the Galaxy Tab Active 5, the basic model was released on January 23, 2024, while the Pro model was released on May 7, 2025. It is the successor to the Galaxy Xcover 5 and the Galaxy XCover 6 Pro. It features 6 GB of memory, with 128 GB of storage, and microSD card support up to 1TB. It supports 2 nano-SIM cards. It also features a USB-C port which uses the USB 2.0 standard. It weighs 240g and has a 4050 mAh battery.
