= Samsung Galaxy Xcover 4 =

2017 rugged mid-range smartphone by Samsung Electronics

Samsung Galaxy Xcover 4 Samsung Galaxy Xcover 4s

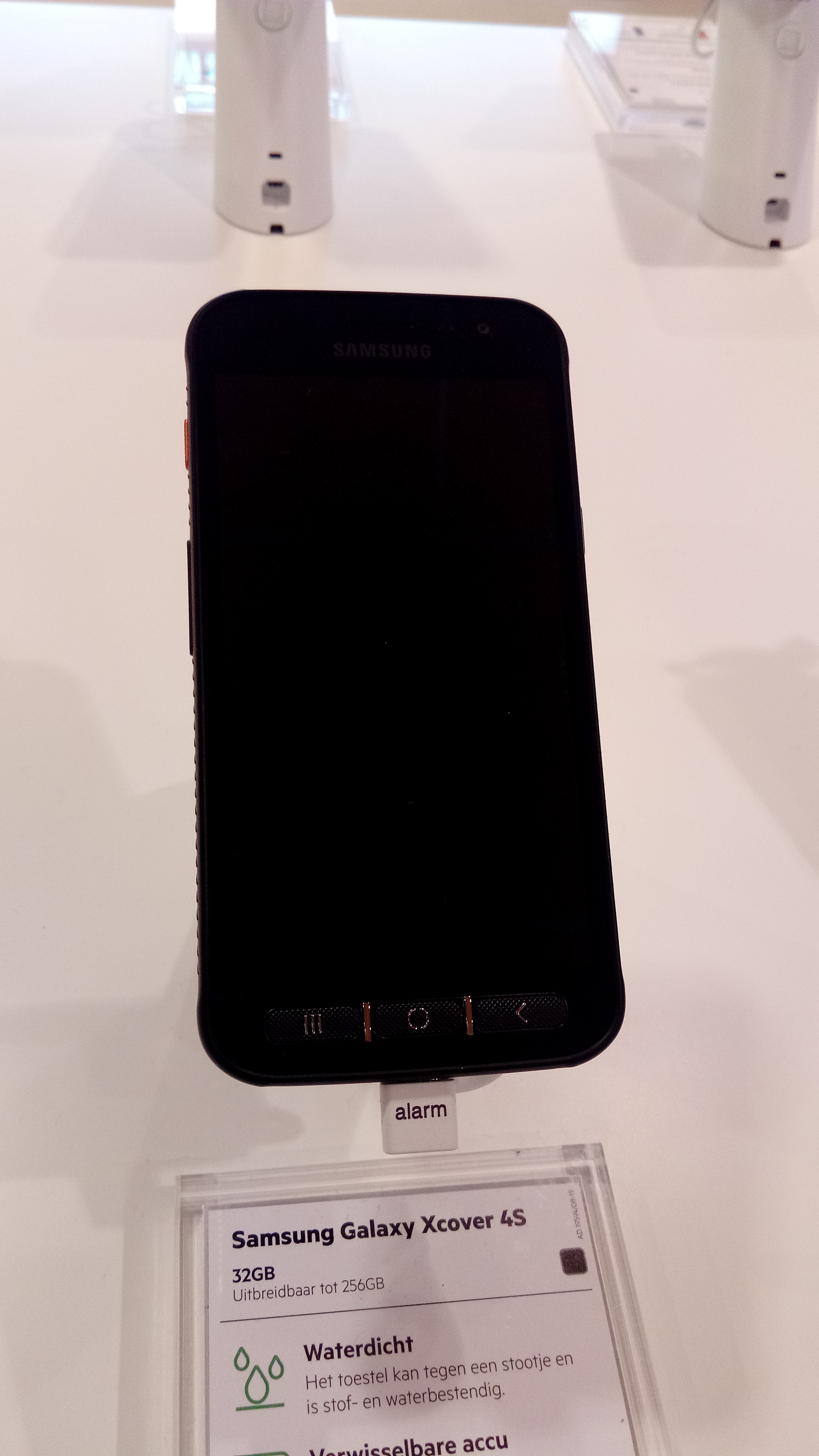
- Samsung Galaxy Xcover 4s
- Brand: Samsung
- Manufacturer: Samsung Electronics
- Type: Smartphone
- Series: Galaxy Xcover
- Family: Samsung Galaxy
- First released: Xcover 4: April 24, 2017; 9 years ago Xcover 4s: July 1, 2019; 7 years ago
- Availability by region: Xcover 4: April 24, 2017; 9 years ago Xcover 4s: July 1, 2019; 7 years ago
- Discontinued: Xcover 4: October 2019; 6 years ago Xcover 4s: March 4, 2021; 5 years ago
- Predecessor: Samsung Galaxy Xcover 3
- Successor: Samsung Galaxy Xcover FieldPro; Samsung Galaxy Xcover 5
- Form factor: Slate
- Dimensions: 146.2 mm (5.76 in) H 73.3 mm (2.89 in) W 9.7 mm (0.38 in) D
- Weight: 172 g (6.1 oz)
- Operating system: Xcover 4: Original: Android 7.0 "Nougat" with Samsung Experience 8.0; Current: Android 9 "Pie" with One UI 1.0; Xcover 4s: Original: Android 9 "Pie" with One UI 1.1; Current: Android 11 with One UI 3.1
- System-on-chip: Xcover 4: Exynos 7570 Quad; Xcover 4s: Exynos 7885
- CPU: Quad-core, 1.4 GHz ARM Cortex A53
- GPU: Mali T720
- Memory: 2 GB RAM, 3 GB RAM
- Storage: 16 GB, 32 GB
- Removable storage: MicroSD, up to 256 GB
- Battery: 2800 mAh Li-ion battery user replaceable
- Rear camera: 13 MP
- Front camera: 5 MP
- Display: 5.0 inches (130 mm), 720 × 1280 pixels (294 ppi) IPS LCD capacitive touchscreen, 16M colors
- Connectivity: USB 2.0, Bluetooth 4.2, Wi-Fi, Wi-Fi Direct, GPS Location, NFC
- Model: Xcover 4: SM-G390; Xcover 4s: SM-G398
- Website: Galaxy Xcover 4

The Samsung Galaxy Xcover 4 is a rugged mid-range Android-based smartphone manufactured, developed, produced and marketed by Samsung Electronics and released in April 2017. It is the successor to the Galaxy Cover 3. The Xcover 4 is waterproof and dustproof, designed around the IP68 specifications. The Samsung Galaxy Xcover 4 has models SM-G390F, SM-G390W, and SM-G390Y. This phone has been succeeded by the Galaxy Xcover 4s, the Galaxy Xcover FieldPro, and the Galaxy Xcover 5.
