= Samsung Galaxy Xcover FieldPro =

Android-based smartphone

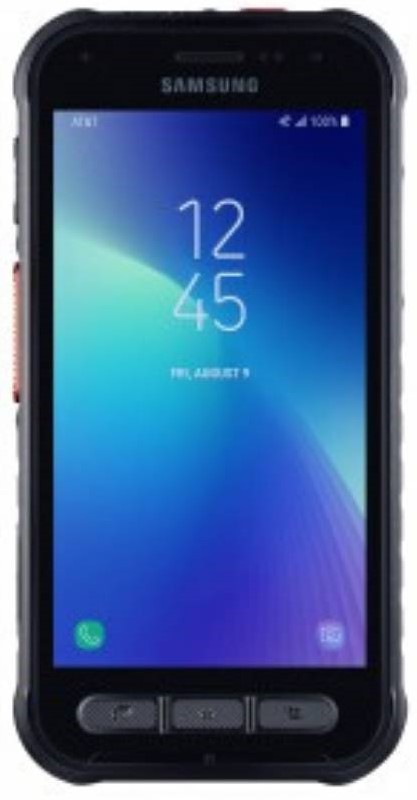
- Brand: Samsung
- Manufacturer: Samsung Electronics
- Type: Smartphone
- Series: Galaxy Xcover
- Family: Samsung Galaxy
- First released: October 2019; 6 years ago
- Availability by region: April 6, 2020; 6 years ago
- Predecessor: Samsung Galaxy Xcover 4
- Successor: Samsung Galaxy Xcover Pro; Samsung Galaxy Xcover 5
- Compatible networks: GSM / HSPA / LTE
- Form factor: Slate
- Dimensions: 158.5 mm (6.24 in) H 80.7 mm (3.18 in) W 14.2 mm (0.56 in) D
- Weight: 256 g (9.0 oz)
- Operating system: Android 8.1 Oreo; Android 9 Pie; Android 10 (except AT&T)
- System-on-chip: Samsung Exynos 9810 (10 nm)
- CPU: Octa-core (4x2.7 GHz Mongoose M3 & 4x1.8 GHz Cortex-A55)
- GPU: Mali-G72 MP18
- Memory: 4GB RAM
- Storage: 64GB
- SIM: Single SIM (Micro-SIM) or Dual SIM (Micro-SIM, dual stand-by)
- Battery: Li-Po 4500 mAh, removable
- Rear camera: 12 MP, f/1.5-2.4, (wide), 1/2.55", 1.4 μm, PDAF; Triple-LED flash, HDR, panorama 1080p@30fps
- Front camera: 8 MP, f/1.7 HDR; 1080p@30fps
- Display: 5.1 in (130 mm) 71.7 cm2 (~56.1% screen-to-body ratio); 1440 x 2560 pixels, 16:9 ratio (~576 ppi density)
- Sound: Loudspeaker, 3.5mm jack
- Connectivity: USB Type-C 2.0; Wi-Fi 802.11 a/b/g/n/ac/6/i/r, dual-band, Wi-Fi Direct, hotspot Bluetooth 5.0, A2DP, LE
- Data inputs: Sensors: Fingerprint (rear-mounted); Accelerometer; Gyro; Proximity; Compass; Barometer
- Water resistance: IP68 dust/water resistant (up to 1.5m for 30 mins)
- Model: SM-G889F (Global); SM-G889A (AT&T); SM-G889YB (Germany, unknown if it sold elsewhere in Europe); SM-G889G (Singapore); SM-G889N (South Korea)
- SAR: 1.20 W/kg (head); 0.67 W/kg (body)

The Samsung Galaxy Xcover FieldPro is a mid-range rugged Android-based smartphone manufactured and developed by Samsung Electronics, as part of its Galaxy Xcover series. It was released on April 6, 2020. the phone has a 5.1 inch QHD display and 12MP main camera.
