= Samsung Galaxy Xcover 5 =

2021 mid-range smartphone by Samsung Electronics

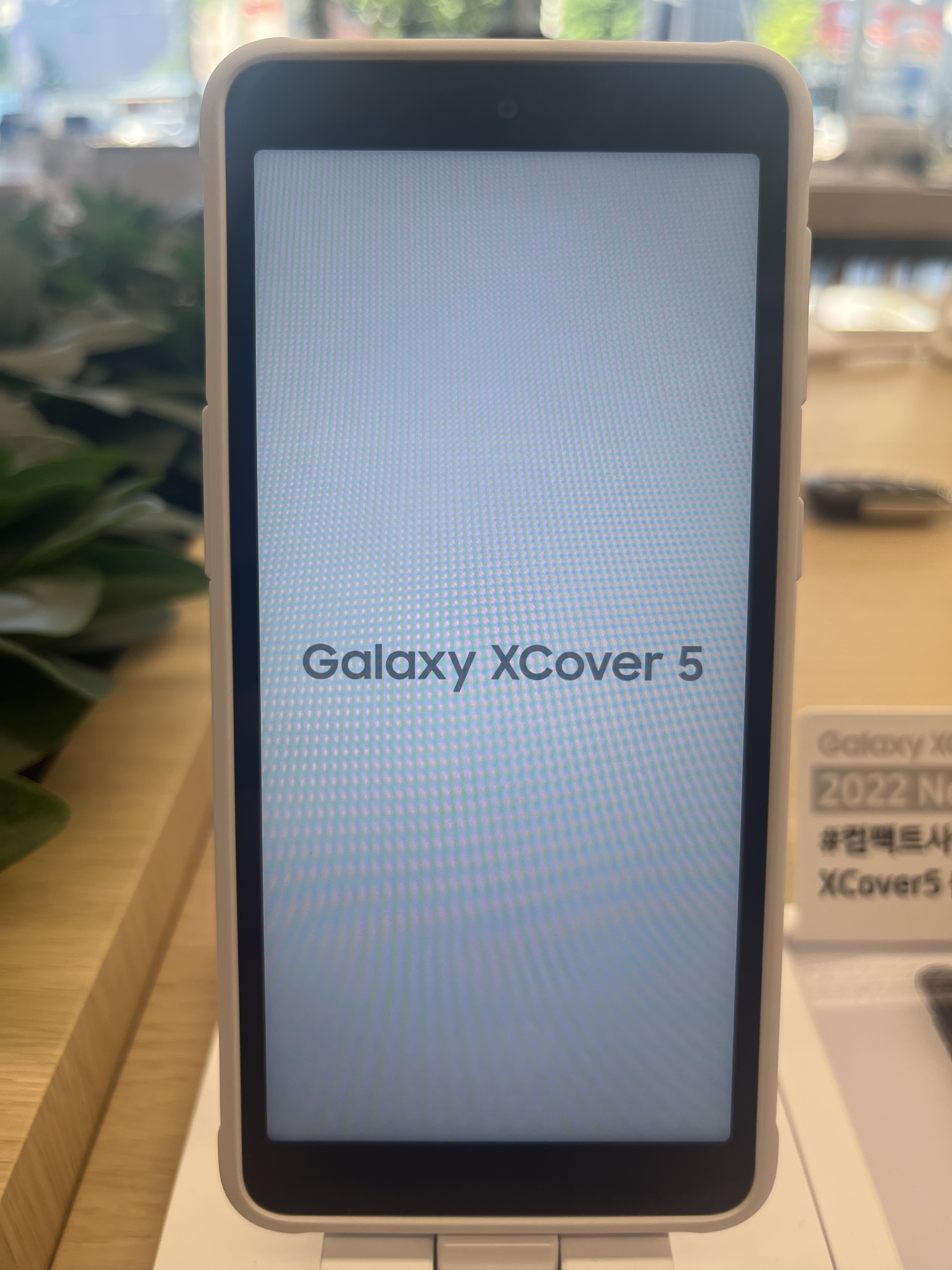
- Front of the Samsung Galaxy Xcover 5
- Brand: Samsung
- Manufacturer: Samsung Electronics
- Type: Smartphone
- Series: Galaxy Xcover
- Family: Samsung Galaxy
- First released: March 4, 2021; 5 years ago
- Availability by region: March 12, 2021; 5 years ago
- Predecessor: Samsung Galaxy Xcover 4 Samsung Galaxy Xcover FieldPro
- Successor: Samsung Galaxy Xcover 6 Pro; Samsung Galaxy Xcover 7
- Compatible networks: GSM / HSPA / LTE
- Form factor: Slate
- Dimensions: 147.1 mm (5.79 in) H 71.6 mm (2.82 in) W 9.2 mm (0.36 in) D
- Weight: 172 g (6.1 oz)
- Operating system: Original: Android 11 with One UI 3.1; Current: Android 14 with One UI 6.1
- System-on-chip: Samsung Exynos 850 (8nm)
- CPU: Octa-core (4x2.0 GHz Cortex-A55 & 4x2.0 GHz Cortex-A55)
- GPU: Mali-G52
- Memory: 4GB RAM
- Storage: 64GB eMMC 5.1
- Removable storage: microSDXC
- SIM: Single SIM (Nano-SIM) or Dual SIM (Nano-SIM, dual stand-by)
- Battery: Li-Ion 3000 mAh
- Charging: Fast battery charging 15W
- Rear camera: 16 MP, f/1.8, PDAF; Dual LED flash, HDR, panorama 1080p@30fps
- Front camera: 5 MP, f/2.2
- Display: 5.3 in (130 mm), 71.3 cm2 (~67.7% screen-to-body ratio); 720 x 1480 pixels, 18.5:9 ratio (~311 ppi density); PLS IPS
- Sound: Loudspeaker; 3.5mm jack
- Connectivity: Wi-Fi 802.11 a/b/g/n/ac, dual-band, Wi-Fi Direct, hotspot Bluetooth 5.0, A2DP, LE; A-GPS, GLONASS, GALILEO, BDS; NFC, Radio
- Data inputs: Multi-touch screen; USB Type-C 2.0; Accelerometer; Gyroscope; Proximity sensor; Compass
- Water resistance: IP68 dust/water resistant (up to 1.5m for 30 mins)
- SAR: 0.70 W/kg (head); 1.27 W/kg (body)
- Website: www.samsung.com/my/business/smartphones/galaxy-xcover/galaxy-xcover5-g525-sm-g525fzkds09/

The Samsung Galaxy Xcover 5 is an Android-based smartphone designed, marketed, and manufactured by Samsung Electronics. It was announced on March 4, 2021. The phone has a single-camera setup with a 16 MP main camera, a 5.3 in HD+ display, and a 3000 mAh Li-Ion battery. It ships with Android 11 (One UI 3).

== Design ==
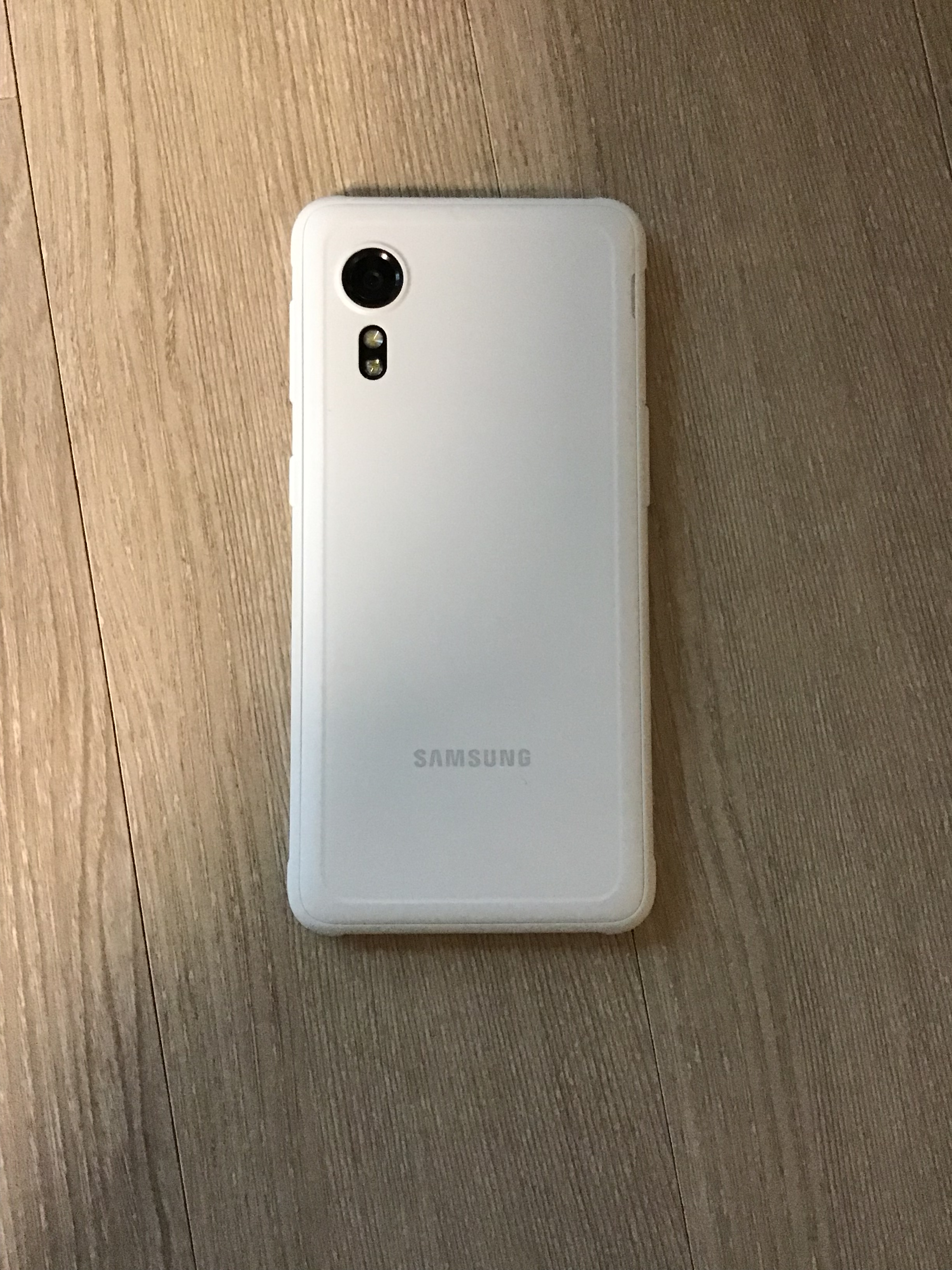
Back of the Samsung Galaxy Xcover 5

The Samsung Galaxy Xcover 5 built with an aluminum frame, and a plastic back for the screen. The device is available in Black.

== Specifications ==
=== Hardware ===
It has loudspeakers, one located on the bottom edge and the other doubling as the earpiece. A USB-C port is used for charging and connecting other accessories.

The Samsung Galaxy Xcover 5 uses the Exynos 850 processor, Octa-core (4x2.0 GHz Cortex-A55 & 4x2.0 GHz Cortex-A55) CPU, Mali-G52 GPU with 4 GB of RAM and 64 GB of eMMC 5.1 internal storage. It can also be expanded via microSD.

The Samsung Galaxy Xcover 5 has a 3000 mAh battery, and is capable of fast charging at up to 15 W. It has an IP68 water protection rating.

The Samsung Galaxy Xcover 5 features a 5.3-inch 720p PLS LCD. The display has a 18.5:9 aspect ratio.

The Samsung Galaxy Xcover 5 includes a single rear-facing camera. The wide f/1.8 lens 16-megapixel sensor, the front-facing camera uses a 5-megapixel sensor. It is capable of recording 1080p video at 30 fps.

=== Software ===
This device ships with Android 11 and Samsung's custom One UI 3.1 software overlay. In April 2021, it was announced by Samsung that the Xcover 5 alongside some highend devices from 2021, would be supported for three generations of Android software updates.

Samsung released the Android 12 update to the Galaxy Xcover 5 on January 11, 2022. The update includes One UI 4. In July that year, Samsung released the security update which includes several bugs and issue fixes.

An official list released by Samsung on November 7, 2022, further confirmed that the Xcover 5 would be receiving the Android 13 upgrade with One UI 5.0.

In January 2024, the Galaxy Xcover 5 received the Android 14 upgrade with One UI 6, which marked the last major operating system upgrade for the device. The latest version of One UI based on Android was released as One UI 6.1, based on Android 14, with the February 2025 security build.
