= Samsung Galaxy Xcover series =

Series of mid-range smartphones by Samsung

- Logo since 2016, without Samsung word
- Developer: Samsung Electronics
- Product family: Samsung Galaxy
- Type: Smartphones; Tablet computers (Galaxy Tab Active)
- Released: August 1, 2011; 15 years ago
- Operating system: Android
- Input: Touchscreen
- Predecessor: Samsung Galaxy S Active (2013-2017)

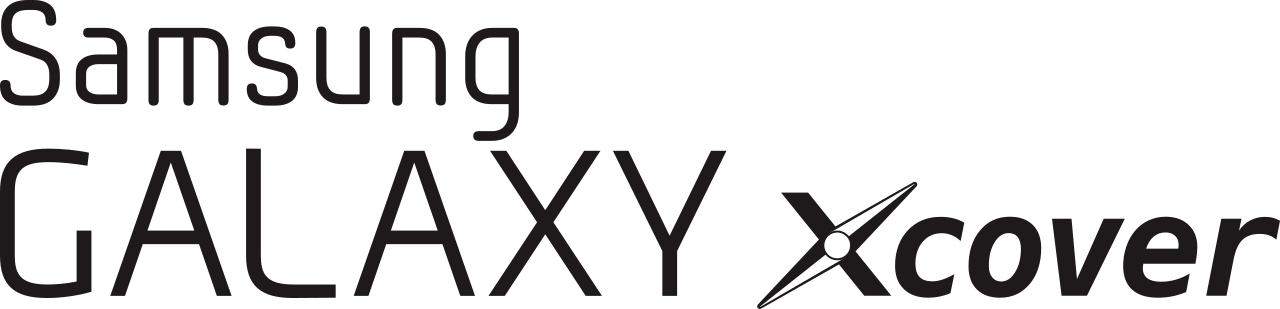
Logo used before 2016

The Samsung Galaxy Xcover series is a line of rugged (per MIL-STD-810) "business" phones, which have low-end specifications but with stronger build quality and durability. The devices also feature removable batteries and the "No battery" mode (i.e., can operate powered via the USB cable with the battery removed). This series is a line of devices that are intended for work purposes. It features both phones and tablets with reinforced structures for harsher conditions. They also contain features marketed for business use. These devices contain lower specifications, not aimed at personal use.

Galaxy Xcover series release timeline
2011	Samsung Galaxy Xcover
2012
2013	Samsung Galaxy Xcover 2
2014
2015	Samsung Galaxy Xcover 3
2016	Samsung Galaxy Xcover 3 Value Edition
2017	Samsung Galaxy Xcover 4
2018
2019	Samsung Galaxy Xcover 4s
2019	Samsung Galaxy Xcover FieldPro
2020	Samsung Galaxy Xcover Pro
2021	Samsung Galaxy Xcover 5
2022	Samsung Galaxy Xcover 6 Pro
2023
2024	Samsung Galaxy Xcover 7
2025	Samsung Galaxy Xcover 7 Pro

== Smartphones ==
Legend:	Unsupported	Security only	Supported	Upcoming

=== Samsung Galaxy Xcover ===
Models		Xcover
Support Status		Unsupported
Dates	Announced	August 2011
Dates	Released	October 2011
OS	Initial	TouchWiz 4.0; Android 2.3 Gingerbread
OS	Latest	TouchWiz 4.0; Android 2.3 Gingerbread
Dimensions mm (in)	Height	121.5 (4.78)
Dimensions mm (in)	Width	65.9 (2.59)
Dimensions mm (in)	Depth	12 (0.47)
Weight g (lb)		100 (3.53)
Display	Size	3.65 in (397 mm)
Display	Resolution	320 x 480
Display	Type	PLS LCD
Display	Protection	Corning Gorilla Glass
Camera	Front Camera	No
Camera	Rear Camera	3.15 MP
RAM		150MB
Storage		512MB
Battery	Capacity (mAh)	1500
Battery	Removable	Yes
Battery	Fast Charging	No

=== Samsung Galaxy Xcover 2 ===
Models		Xcover 2
Support Status		Unsupported
Dates	Announced	January 2013
Dates	Released	March 2013
OS	Initial	TouchWiz Nature UX; Android 4.1.2 Jelly Bean
OS	Latest	TouchWiz Nature UX; Android 4.1.2 Jelly Bean
Dimensions mm (in)	Height	130.5 (5.14)
Dimensions mm (in)	Width	67.7 (2.67)
Dimensions mm (in)	Depth	12 (0.47)
Weight g (lb)		148.5 (5.22)
Display	Size	4.0 in (455 mm)
Display	Resolution	480 x 800
Display	Type	TFT
Display	Protection	Scratch-resistant glass
Camera	Front Camera	VGA
Camera	Rear Camera	5 MP
RAM		1GB
Storage		4GB
Battery	Capacity (mAh)	1700
Battery	Removable	Yes
Battery	Fast Charging	No

=== Samsung Galaxy Xcover 3 ===
Models		Xcover 3	Xcover 3 VE
Support Status		Unsupported	
Dates	Announced	March 2015	April 2016
Dates	Released	April 2015	April 2016
OS	Initial	TouchWiz Nature UX 3.0; Android 4.4.4 KitKat	TouchWiz Hero UX; Android 6.0 Marshmallow
OS	Latest	TouchWiz Noble UX; Android 5.1.1 Lollipop	TouchWiz Hero UX; Android 6.0 Marshmallow
Dimensions mm (in)	Height	132.9 (5.23)	
Dimensions mm (in)	Width	70.1 (2.76)	
Dimensions mm (in)	Depth	10 (0.39)	
Weight g (lb)		154 (5.43)	
Display	Size	4.5 in (576 mm)	
Display	Resolution	480 x 800	
Display	Type	PLS LCD	
Camera	Front Camera	2 MP	
Camera	Rear Camera	5 MP	
RAM		1.5GB	
Storage		8GB	
Processor		Marvell; Armada PXA1908	Samsung; Exynos 3475 Quad
Battery	Capacity (mAh)	2200	
Battery	Removable	Yes	
Battery	Fast Charging	No	

=== Samsung Galaxy Xcover 4 ===
Models		Xcover 4	Xcover 4s
Support Status		Unsupported	
Dates	Announced	March 2017	June 2019
Dates	Released	April 2017	July 2019
OS	Initial	Samsung Experience 8.0; Android 7.0 Nougat	One UI 1.1; Android 9.0 Pie
OS	Latest	One UI 1.0; Android 9.0 Pie	One UI 3.1; Android 11
Dimensions mm (in)	Height	146.2 (5.76)	
Dimensions mm (in)	Width	73.3 (2.89)	
Dimensions mm (in)	Depth	9.7 (0.38)	
Weight g (lb)		172 (6.07)	
Display	Size	5.0 in (689 mm)	
Display	Resolution	720 x 1280	
Display	Type	IPS LCD	PLS LCD
Camera	Front Camera	5 MP	
Camera	Rear Camera	13 MP	16 MP
RAM		2GB	3GB
Storage		16GB	32GB
Processor		Samsung; Exynos 7570 Quad	Samsung; Exynos 7885
Battery	Capacity (mAh)	2800	
Battery	Removable	Yes	
Battery	Fast Charging	No	

=== Samsung Galaxy Xcover Pro/FieldPro ===
Models		Xcover FieldPro	Xcover Pro
Support Status		Unsupported	
Dates	Announced	October, 2019	January, 2020
Dates	Released	April 6, 2020	January, 2020
OS	Initial	Samsung Experience 9.5; Android 8.0 Oreo	One UI 2.0; Android 10
OS	Latest	Samsung Experience 9.5; Android 8.0 Oreo	One UI 5.1; Android 13
Dimensions mm (in)	Height	158.5 (6.24)	159.9 (6.30)
Dimensions mm (in)	Width	80.7 (3.18)	76.7 (3.02)
Dimensions mm (in)	Depth	14.2 (0.56)	10 (0.39)
Weight g (lb)		256 (9.03)	218 (7.69)
Display	Size	5.1 in (717 mm)	6.3 in (974 mm)
Display	Resolution	1440 x 2560	1080 x 2340
Display	Type	IPS LCD	
Display	Protection	No	Corning Gorilla Glass 5
Camera	Front Camera	8 MP	13 MP
Camera	Rear Camera	12 MP	25 MP
RAM		4GB	
Storage		64GB	
Processor		Samsung; Exynos 9810	Samsung; Exynos 9611
Battery	Capacity (mAh)	4500	4050
Battery	Removable	Yes	
Battery	Fast Charging	No	15W

=== Samsung Galaxy Xcover 5 ===
Models		Xcover 5
Support Status		Security only
Dates	Announced	March 4, 2021
Dates	Released	March 12, 2021
OS	Initial	One UI 3.1; Android 11
OS	Latest	One UI 6.1; Android 14
Dimensions mm (in)	Height	147.1 (5.79)
Dimensions mm (in)	Width	71.6 (2.82)
Dimensions mm (in)	Depth	9.2 (0.36)
Weight g (lb)		172 (6.07)
Display	Size	5.3 in (713 mm)
Display	Resolution	720 x 1480
Display	Type	PLS LCD
Camera	Front Camera	5 MP
Camera	Rear Camera	16 MP
RAM		4GB
Storage		64GB
Processor		Samsung; Exynos 850
Battery	Capacity (mAh)	3000
Battery	Removable	Yes
Battery	Fast Charging	15W

=== Samsung Galaxy Xcover 6 Pro ===
Models		Xcover 6 Pro
Support Status		Supported
Dates	Announced	June 29, 2022
Dates	Released	July 13, 2022
OS	Initial	One UI 4.1; Android 12
OS	Latest	One UI 8.0; Android 16
Dimensions mm (in)	Height	168.8 (6.65)
Dimensions mm (in)	Width	79.9 (3.15)
Dimensions mm (in)	Depth	9.9 (0.39)
Weight g (lb)		235 (8.29)
Display	Size	6.6 in (1049 mm)
Display	Resolution	1080 x 2408
Display	Type	PLS LCD
Display	Protection	Corning Gorilla Glass Victus+
Camera	Front Camera	13 MP
Camera	Rear Camera	50 MP
RAM		4GB 6GB
Storage		64GB 128GB
Processor		Qualcomm; Snapdragon 778g
Battery	Capacity (mAh)	4050
Battery	Removable	Yes
Battery	Fast Charging	15W

=== Samsung Galaxy Xcover 7 ===
Models		Xcover 7	Xcover 7 Pro
Support Status		Supported	
Dates	Announced	January 10, 2024	April 14, 2025
Dates	Released	January 23, 2024	May 7, 2025
OS	Initial	One UI 6.0; Android 14	One UI 7.0; Android 15
OS	Latest	One UI 8.5; Android 16	
Dimensions mm (in)	Height	169 (6.65)	168.6 (6.64)
Dimensions mm (in)	Width	80.1 (3.15)	79.9 (3.15)
Dimensions mm (in)	Depth	10.2 (0.40)	
Weight g (lb)		240 (8.47)	
Display	Size	6.6 in (1049 mm)	
Display	Resolution	1080 x 2408	
Display	Type	PLS LCD	
Display	Protection	Corning Gorilla Glass Victus+	Corning Gorilla Glass Victus+ Mohs level 5
Camera	Front Camera	5 MP	13 MP
Camera	Rear Camera	50 MP	
RAM		4GB 6GB	6GB 8GB
Storage		64GB 128GB	128GB 256GB
Processor		Mediatek; Dimensity 6100+	Qualcomm; SM7635 Snapdragon 7s Gen 3
Battery	Capacity (mAh)	4050	4350
Battery	Removable	Yes	
Battery	Fast Charging	15W	

== Tablets ==
In September 2014, Samsung announced the Galaxy Tab Active series, a Galaxy Xcover series tablet counterpart, which was released in December of the same year. All of the models are rugged and features S Pen. Since 2022, the Tab Active series models are being released alongside the Xcover series models.

=== Samsung Galaxy Tab Active ===
Models		Tab Active	Tab Active LTE
Support Status		Unsupported	
Dates	Announced	September 2014	
Dates	Released	December 2014	
OS	Initial	TouchWiz Nature UX 3.0; Android 4.4.4 KitKat	TouchWiz Nature UX 3.0; Android 4.4.4 KitKat
OS	Latest	TouchWiz Noble UX; Android 5.1.1 Lollipop	
Dimensions mm (in)	Height	213.1 (8.39)	
Dimensions mm (in)	Width	126.2 (4.97)	
Dimensions mm (in)	Depth	9.7 (0.38)	
Weight g (lb)		393 (13.86)	
Display	Size	8.0 in (1856 mm)	
Display	Resolution	800 x 1280	
Display	Type	LCD	
Camera	Front Camera	1.2 MP	
Camera	Rear Camera	3.15 MP	
RAM		1.5GB	
Storage		16GB	
Processor		Qualcomm; Snapdragon 400	
Battery	Capacity (mAh)	4450	
Battery	Removable	Yes	
Battery	Fast Charging	No	
DeX		No	

=== Samsung Galaxy Tab Active 2 ===
Models		Tab Active 2
Support Status		Unsupported
Dates	Announced	October 2017
Dates	Released	November 2017
OS	Initial	Samsung Experience 8.5; Android 7.1.1 Nougat
OS	Latest	One UI 1.1; Android 9.0 Pie
Dimensions mm (in)	Height	127.6 (5.02)
Dimensions mm (in)	Width	214.7 (8.45)
Dimensions mm (in)	Depth	9.9 (0.39)
Weight g (lb)		415 (14.64, Wi-Fi version) 419 (14.64, LTE version)
Display	Size	8.0 in (1856 mm)
Display	Resolution	800 x 1280
Display	Type	LCD
Camera	Front Camera	5 MP
Camera	Rear Camera	8 MP
RAM		2GB
Storage		16GB
Processor		Samsung; Exynos 7870 Octa
Battery	Capacity (mAh)	4450
Battery	Removable	Yes
Battery	Fast Charging	No
DeX		No

=== Samsung Galaxy Tab Active Pro ===
Models		Tab Active Pro
Support Status		Unsupported
Dates	Announced	September 2019
Dates	Released	October 2019
OS	Initial	One UI 1.5; Android 9.0 Pie
OS	Latest	One UI 3.1; Android 11
Dimensions mm (in)	Height	243.5 (9.59)
Dimensions mm (in)	Width	170.2 (6.70)
Dimensions mm (in)	Depth	9.9 (0.39)
Weight g (lb)		653 (1.44)
Display	Size	10.1 in (2958 mm)
Display	Resolution	480 x 800
Display	Type	LCD, 550 nits
Camera	Front Camera	8 MP
Camera	Rear Camera	13 MP
RAM		4GB
Storage		64GB
Processor		Qualcomm; SDM670 Snapdragon 670
Battery	Capacity (mAh)	7600
Battery	Removable	Yes
Battery	Fast Charging	15W
DeX		Yes

=== Samsung Galaxy Tab Active 3 ===
Models		Tab Active 3
Support Status		Unsupported
Dates	Announced	September 28, 2020
Dates	Released	September 28, 2020
OS	Initial	One UI 2.5; Android 10
OS	Latest	One UI 5.1.1; Android 13
Dimensions mm (in)	Height	213.8 (8.42)
Dimensions mm (in)	Width	126.8 (4.99)
Dimensions mm (in)	Depth	9.9 (0.39)
Weight g (lb)		426 (15.03, Wi-Fi version) 429 (15.03, LTE version)
Display	Size	8.0 in (1856 mm)
Display	Resolution	1200 x 1920
Display	Type	PLS LCD
Camera	Front Camera	5 MP
Camera	Rear Camera	13 MP
RAM		4GB
Storage		64GB 128GB
Processor		Samsung; Exynos 9810
Battery	Capacity (mAh)	5050
Battery	Removable	Yes
Battery	Fast Charging	15W
DeX		Yes

=== Samsung Galaxy Tab Active 4 Pro ===
Models		Tab Active 4 Pro
Support Status		Security only
Dates	Announced	August 31, 2022
Dates	Released	September 13, 2022
OS	Initial	One UI 4.1; Android 12
OS	Latest	One UI 7.0; Android 15
Dimensions mm (in)	Height	242.9 (9.56)
Dimensions mm (in)	Width	170.2 (6.70)
Dimensions mm (in)	Depth	10.2 (0.40)
Weight g (lb)		674 (1.49)
Display	Size	10.1 in (2958 mm)
Display	Resolution	1920 x 1200
Display	Type	TFT LCD
Display	Protection	Corning Gorilla Glass 5
Camera	Front Camera	8 MP
Camera	Rear Camera	13 MP
RAM		4GB 6GB
Storage		64GB 128GB
Processor		Qualcomm; SM7325 Snapdragon 778G 5G
Battery	Capacity (mAh)	7600
Battery	Removable	Yes
Battery	Fast Charging	Unknown
DeX		Yes

=== Samsung Galaxy Tab Active 5 ===
Models		Tab Active 5	Tab Active 5 Pro
Support Status		Supported	
Dates	Announced	January 10, 2024	April 14, 2025
Dates	Released	January 23, 2024	May 7, 2025
OS	Initial	One UI 6.0; Android 14	One UI 7.0; Android 15
OS	Latest	One UI 8.5; Android 16	
Dimensions mm (in)	Height	213.8 (8.42)	242.9 (9.56)
Dimensions mm (in)	Width	126.8 (4.99)	170.2 (6.70)
Dimensions mm (in)	Depth	10.1 (0.40)	10.2 (0.40)
Weight g (lb)		433 (15.27)	680 (1.50) 683 (1.50)
Display	Size	8.0 in (1856 mm)	10.1 in (2958 mm)
Display	Resolution	1920 x 1200	
Display	Type	PLS LCD	
Display	Protection	Corning Gorilla Glass 5	Corning Gorilla Glass Victus+ Mohs level 5
Camera	Front Camera	5 MP	8 MP
Camera	Rear Camera	13 MP	12 MP
RAM		6GB 8GB	
Storage		128GB 256GB	
Processor		Samsung; Exynos 1380	Qualcomm; SM7635 Snapdragon 7s Gen 3
Battery	Capacity (mAh)	5050	10100
Battery	Removable	Yes	
Battery	Fast Charging	Unknown	
DeX		Yes	
