= Samsung Galaxy Xcover 6 Pro =

2022 Android smartphone manufactured by Samsung Electronics

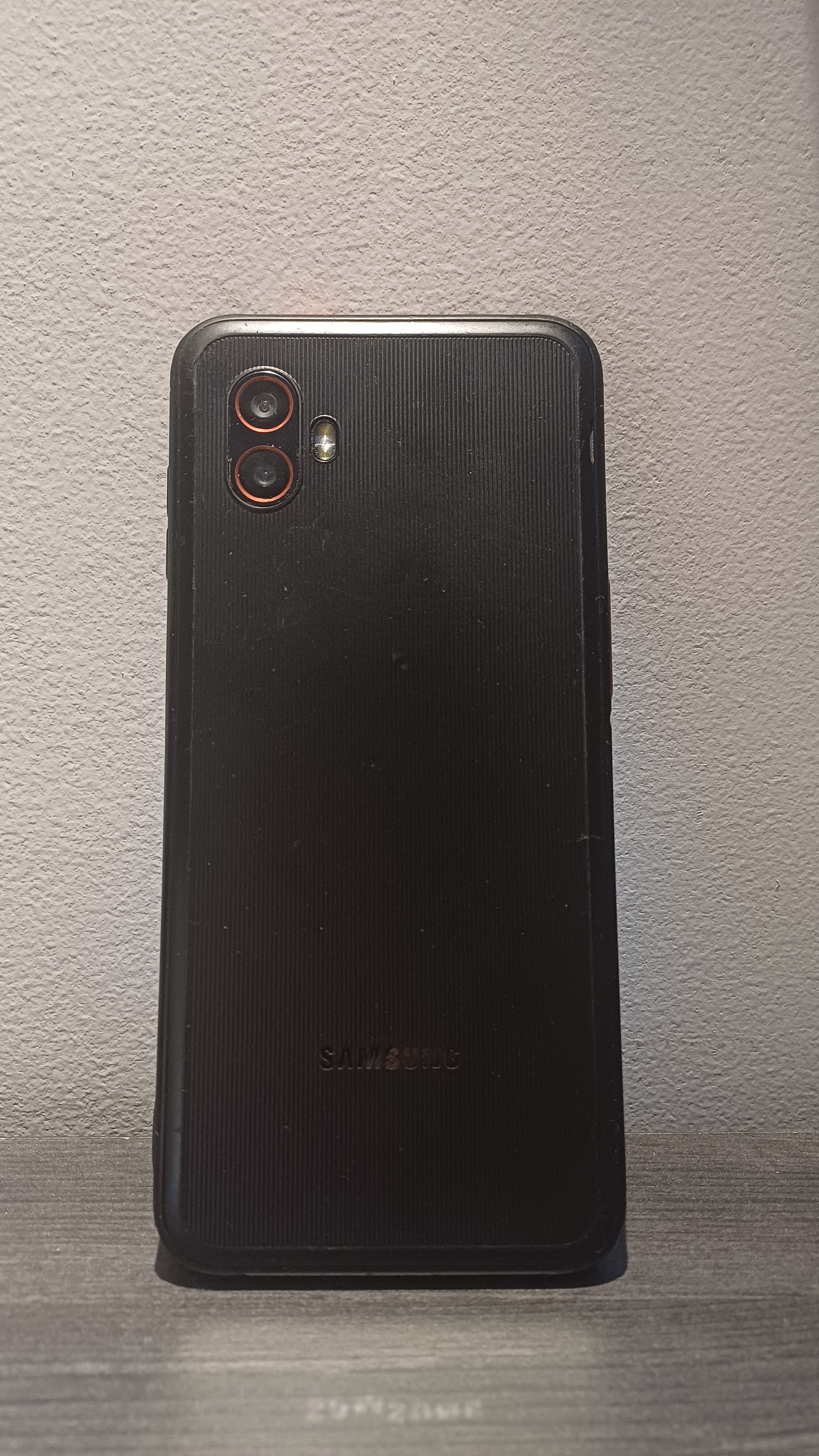
- Galaxy Xcover 6 Pro (back)
- Brand: Samsung
- Manufacturer: Samsung Electronics
- Type: Smartphone
- Series: Galaxy Xcover
- Family: Samsung Galaxy
- First released: July 13, 2022; 3 years ago
- Predecessor: Samsung Galaxy Xcover Pro; Samsung Galaxy Xcover 5
- Successor: Samsung Galaxy Xcover 7 Pro
- Compatible networks: 2G / 3G / 4G LTE / 5G NR
- Form factor: Slate
- Color: Black
- Dimensions: 168.8 mm (6.65 in) H 79.9 mm (3.15 in) W 9.9 mm (0.39 in) D
- Weight: 235 g (8.3 oz)
- Operating system: Original: Android 12 with One UI 4.1; Current: Android 16 with One UI 8.0
- System-on-chip: Qualcomm Snapdragon 778G 5G (6 nm)
- CPU: Octa-core (1x2.4 GHz Cortex-A78 & 3x2.2 GHz Cortex-A78 & 4x1.9 GHz Cortex-A55)
- GPU: Adreno 642L
- Memory: 6 GB RAM
- Storage: 128 GB
- Removable storage: microSDXC
- SIM: Single SIM (Nano-SIM) or Dual SIM (Nano-SIM, dual stand-by)
- Battery: Li-Po 4050 mAh, removable
- Charging: 15W Fast charging
- Rear camera: 50 MP, f/1.8, (wide), 1/2.76", 0.64μm, PDAF; 8 MP, f/2.2, 123˚ (ultrawide), 1/4.0", 1.12μm Dual-LED flash, HDR, panorama 4K@30fps, 1080p@30fps
- Front camera: 13 MP, f/2.2, (wide), 1/3.1", 1.12μm 1080p@30fps
- Display: 6.6 in (170 mm); 1080 x 2408 pixels, 20:9 ratio (~400 ppi density); PLS LCD, 120Hz refresh rate Corning Gorilla Glass Victus+
- External display: None
- Sound: Yes
- Connectivity: USB-C (with Samsung DeX/DisplayPort support); Wi-Fi 802.11 a/b/g/n/ac/mc/6e, tri-band, Wi-Fi Direct; Bluetooth 5.2, A2DP, LE
- Data inputs: Multi-touch screen; USB Type-C 3.2; Fingerprint scanner (side-mounted); Accelerometer; Gyroscope; Proximity sensor; Compass; Barometer
- Water resistance: IP68 dust/water resistant (up to 1.5m for 35 mins)
- Model: SM-G736U, SM-G736U1, SM-G736B, SM-G736B/DS
- SAR: 1.03 W/kg (head); 1.08 W/kg (body)
- Website: "Galaxy XCover6 Pro | Rugged Phone for Business | Samsung Business | undefined US". Samsung us.

The Samsung Galaxy Xcover 6 Pro is an Android-based smartphone designed, marketed, and manufactured by Samsung Electronics. It was announced on June 29, 2022.

The Galaxy Xcover 6 Pro was succeeded by the Galaxy Xcover 7 Pro in 2025.
