= Samsung Galaxy Xcover Pro =

2020 Android smartphone by Samsung Electronics

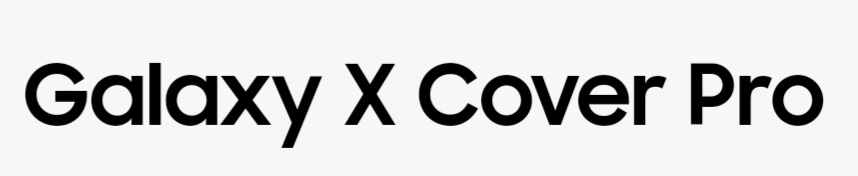

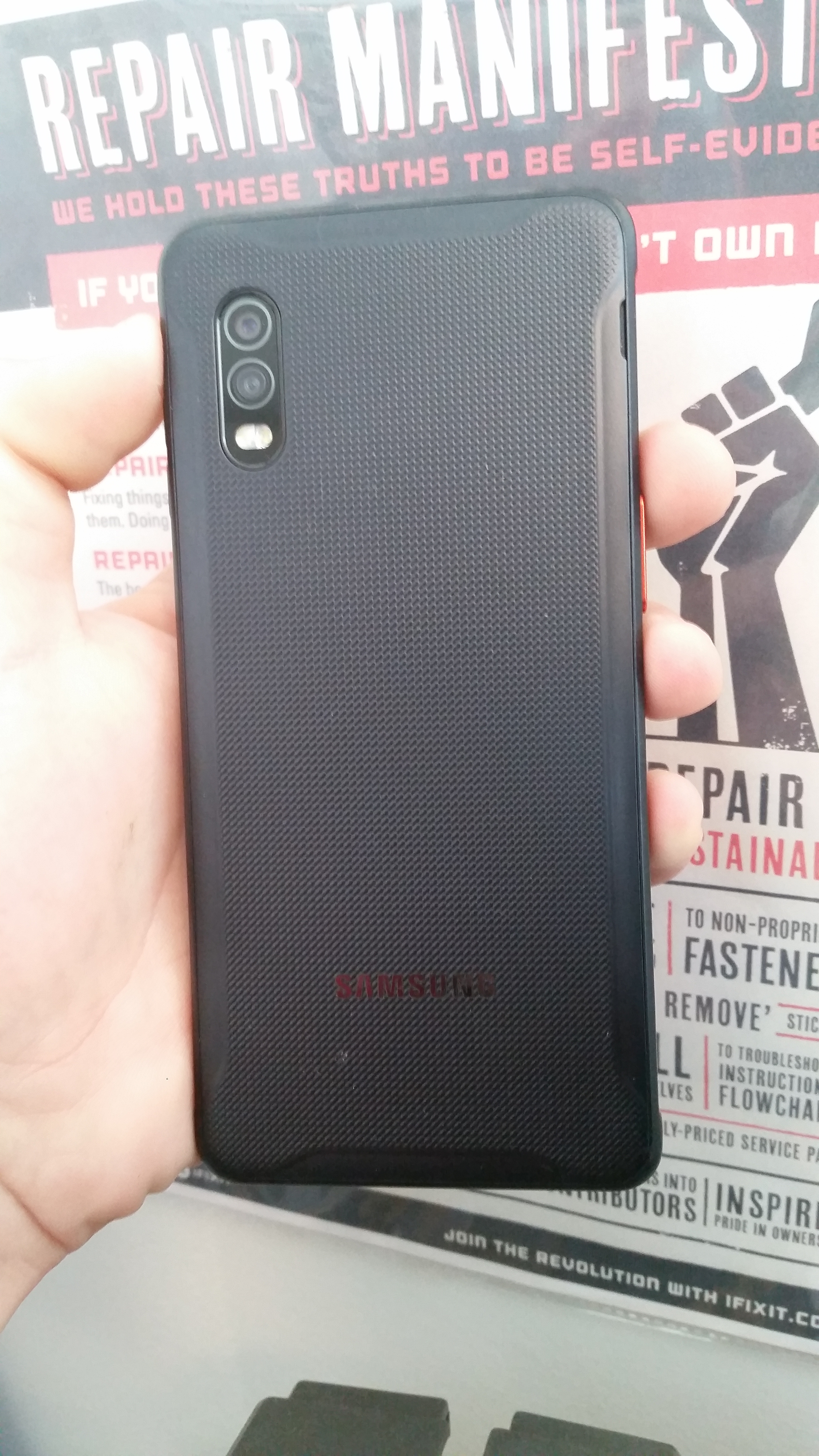
- Back of the Samsung Galaxy Xcover Pro
- Brand: Samsung
- Manufacturer: Samsung Electronics
- Type: Smartphone
- Series: Galaxy Xcover
- Family: Samsung Galaxy
- First released: January 2020; 6 years ago
- Predecessor: Samsung Galaxy Xcover FieldPro
- Successor: Samsung Galaxy Xcover 6 Pro
- Form factor: Slate
- Dimensions: 159.9 mm (6.30 in) H 76.7 mm (3.02 in) W 10 mm (0.39 in) D
- Weight: 218 g (7.7 oz)
- Operating system: Original: Android 10 with One UI 2.0; Current: Android 13 with One UI 5.1
- System-on-chip: Samsung Exynos 9611 (10nm)
- CPU: Octa-core (4x2.3 GHz Cortex-A73 & 4x1.7 GHz Cortex-A53)
- GPU: Mali-G72 MP3
- Memory: 4 GB RAM
- Storage: 64 GB
- Removable storage: microSDXC
- SIM: Single SIM (Nano-SIM) or Dual SIM (Nano-SIM, dual stand-by)
- Battery: 4050 mAh
- Charging: Fast charging 15W
- Rear camera: 25 MP, f/1.7, 26mm (wide), PDAF 8 MP, f/2.2, 123˚ (ultrawide), 1/4.0", 1.12 μm Dual-LED flash, HDR, panorama 1080p@30fps
- Front camera: 13 MP, f/2.0, (wide), 1/3.1", 1.12 μm 1080p@30fps
- Display: 6.3 in (160 mm); 1080 × 2340 resolution, 19.5:9 aspect ratio (~409 ppi density); Corning Gorilla Glass 5
- Connectivity: Wi-Fi 802.11 a/b/g/n/ac/k/v/r, dual-band, Wi-Fi Direct, hotspot Bluetooth 5.0, A2DP, LE
- Water resistance: IP68 dust/water resistant (up to 1.5m for 35 mins)
- Model: SM-G715FN/DS (International); SM-G715W (Canada); SM-G715U (USA); SM-G715U1 (USA Unlocked)

The Samsung Galaxy Xcover Pro is an Android-based smartphone designed and manufactured by Samsung. The device is intended to be a work-friendly device as opposed to a more personal cellular device. It has a tough, rugged design that is supposed to protect the devices internals. The device does not feature 5G capabilities, which are often found in personal devices. The device is intended to work on Wi-Fi connection. The phone was announced and released in January 2020.

== Walmart ==
In the Spring of 2020, the worldwide retail store Walmart made a deal with Samsung to purchase 740,000 Samsung Galaxy Xcover Pro devices. This agreement is Samsung's largest mobile enterprise deal in the US. These devices were to be used by Walmart Associates in stores. The devices are used to assist associates in daily tasks and also were chosen to replace the use of Walkie-Talkies and barcode scanners. They are starting to be replaced by Google Pixel 8a beginning in 2025.
