= Samsung Galaxy Xcover 2 =

2013 Android smartphone

Galaxy Xcover 2 GT-S7710
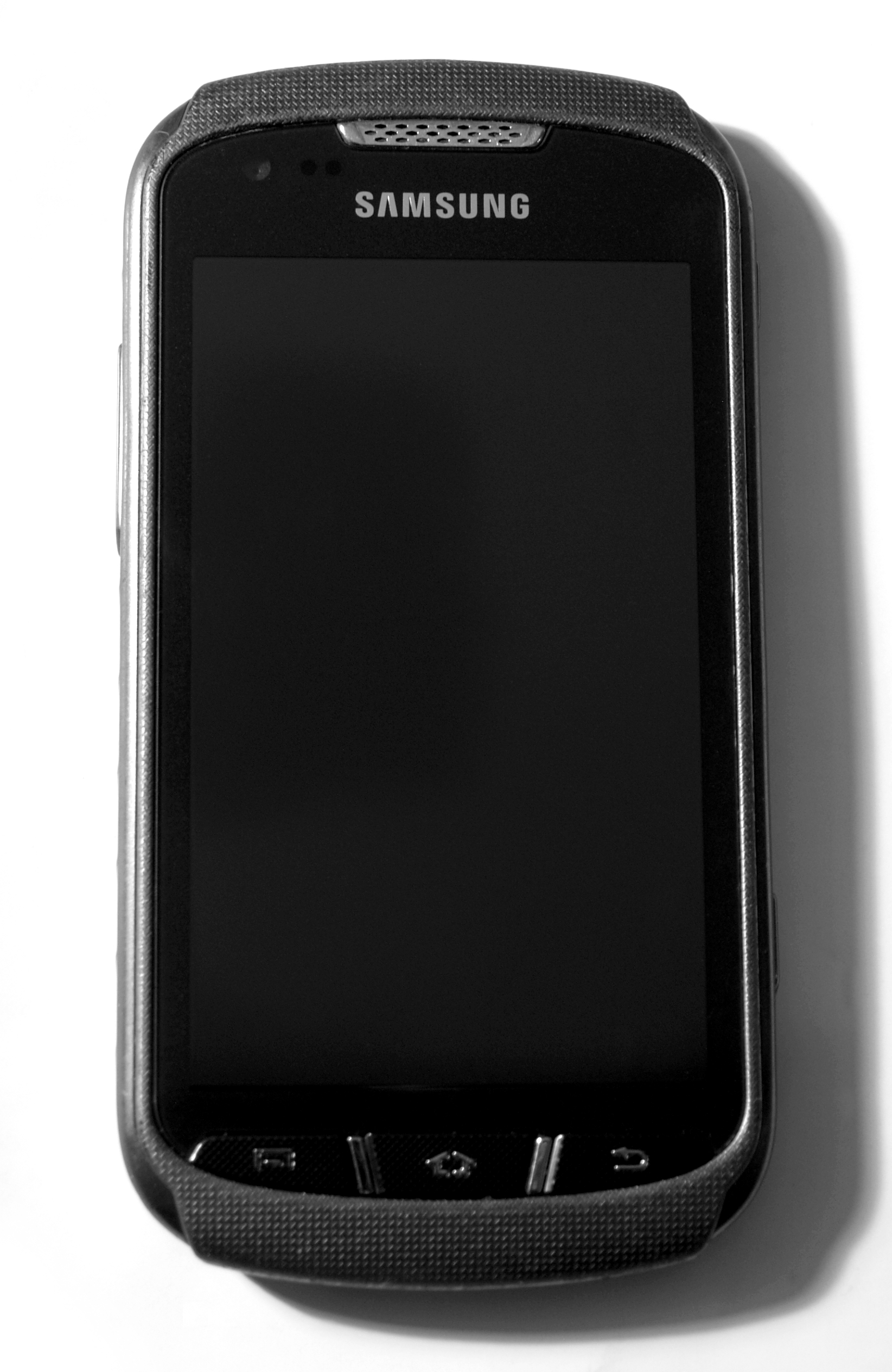
- Manufacturer: Samsung Electronics
- Type: Smartphone
- Series: Galaxy
- First released: March 1, 2013; 13 years ago
- Predecessor: Samsung Galaxy Xcover
- Successor: Samsung Galaxy Xcover 3
- Compatible networks: 2G EDGE/GPRS (850/900/1800/1900 MHz); 3G HSPA (42/5.76 Mbps 850/900/2100 MHz)
- Form factor: Slate
- Dimensions: 130.5 mm (5.14 in) H 66.7 mm (2.63 in) W 12.08 mm (0.476 in) D
- Weight: 148.5 g (5.24 oz)
- Operating system: Original: Android 4.1.2 "Jelly Bean" With TouchWiz Current: Android 4.2.2 "Jelly Bean" With TouchWiz
- CPU: NovaThor Dual Core Application Processor; Cortex A9 1GHz
- GPU: Mali-400
- Memory: 1 GB RAM
- Storage: 4 GB (about 100 MB available, the rest is filled with preinstalled apps)
- Removable storage: microSD up to 32 GB
- Battery: 1,700 mAh, 3.7 V, internal rechargeable Li-ion, user replaceable
- Rear camera: 5 Mpx 2560 x 1920 pixels, 720p@30fps, autofocus, LED flash, physical shutter button
- Front camera: VGA
- Display: 4.0 in (100 mm) TFT LCD diagonal 480×800 px WVGA; 16M colors
- Connectivity: 3.5 mm jack Bluetooth 4.0 with A2DP; DLNA; Stereo FM radio with RDS; Micro-USB 2.0; Wi-Fi 802.11 b/g/n, Wi-Fi Direct, Wi-Fi hotspot
- Data inputs: Multi-touch, capacitive touchscreen Accelerometer; A-GPS; GLONASS; Digital compass Proximity sensor Push buttons
- Codename: Skomer
- Other: IP67 water and dust proof, physical options and go-back buttons

The Samsung Galaxy Xcover 2 (GT-S7710 or GT-S7710L for Latin American markets) is a water and dust proof IP67 smartphone manufactured by Samsung that runs the Android operating system. Announced and released by Samsung in March 2013, the Galaxy Xcover 2 is the successor to the Xcover. however, in 2015, the Xcover 2 itself was replaced by the Xcover 3.

== Features ==
The Galaxy Xcover 2 is a 3G smartphone with quad band GSM. It sports a display of a 4.0 inch PLS TFT LCD capacitive touchscreen with 16M colours WVGA (480x800) resolution. It has a 5-megapixel autofocus camera with LED flash with a VGA front-facing camera. It comes with a 1700 mAh Li-ion battery that can be replaced after unlocking the battery cover using a screwdriver.

The Galaxy Xcover 2 comes with Android 4.1.2 Jelly Bean. Bundled with Music Hub 3.0, Game Hub 2.0, Chat-On and Samsung Apps.

== See also ==
- List of Android smartphones
- Samsung Galaxy
- Samsung i847 Rugby Smart
