= Samsung Galaxy Camera 2 =

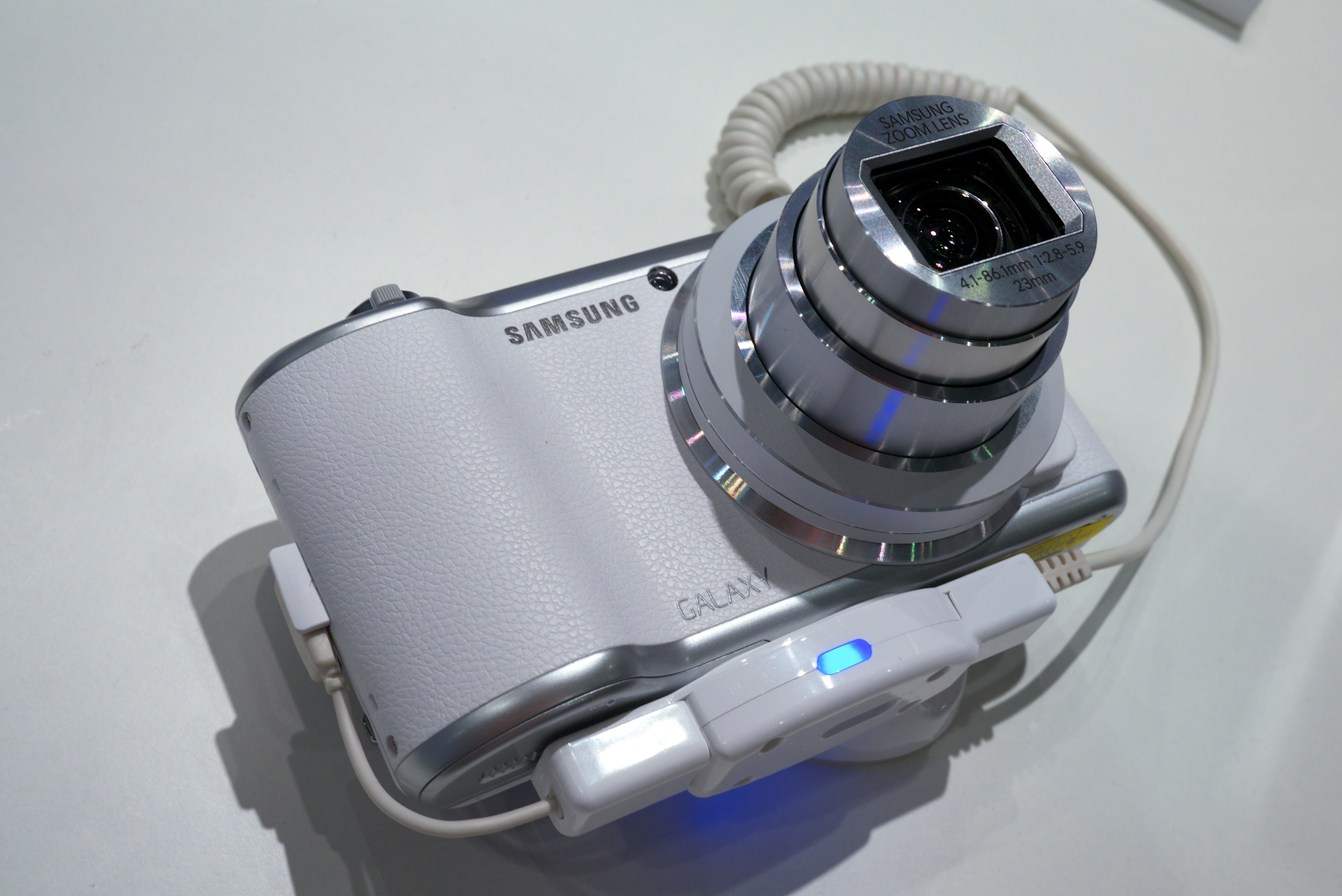

Overview
- Maker: Samsung
- Type: Point-and-shoot
- Released: March 2014

Lens
- Lens: 4.1-86.1 mm (21x optical zoom)

Sensor/medium
- Sensor size: 1/2.3 (6.17mm x 4.55mm)
- Maximum resolution: 16 megapixels
- Film speed: ISO 100 to 3200
- Storage media: 8GB, expanded via micro-SD/SDHC/SDXC (up to 64GB)

Flash
- Flash: Built-in

Shutter
- Shutter: Electronic
- Shutter speed range: 16 sec to 1/2,000th sec
- Continuous shooting: Yes, up to 4.3 photos/s

General
- LCD screen: 4.8" (122 mm) LCD touchscreen, 1280 x 720 pixels
- Battery: 2000 mAh
- Dimensions: 71.2×132.5×19.3 mm (2.80×5.22×0.76 in)
- Weight: 283 g (10 oz)

The Samsung Galaxy Camera 2 is a point-and-shoot camera which is an Android-based mobile device. Announced at the 2014 Consumer Electronic Show in Las Vegas, Nevada, the Galaxy Camera 2 features Android 4.3 Jelly Bean, 1.6 GHz quad-core Exynos 4412 processor and 2GB RAM. The Galaxy Camera 2 is the successor to the Samsung Galaxy Camera. Unlike its predecessor, it has a GPS receiver.

== Software bugs ==
When turning on the device in portrait mode while having auto-rotation turned on, half of the bootscreen would sometimes be rotated in that direction before you get to the lockscreen/homescreen.
