= Casio G'zOne Commando =

Android smartphone

- Manufacturer: NEC Casio Mobile Communications（Casio）
- Type: Smartphone
- Series: G'zOne
- First released: 28 April 2011; 15 years ago
- Availability by region: United States April 28, 2011 (Verizon)
- Successor: G'zOne COMMANDO 4G LTE
- Related: G'zOne Brigade, G'zOne Ravine
- Form factor: Bar
- Dimensions: 5.08 in (129 mm) H 2.58 in (66 mm) W 0.60 in (15 mm) D
- Weight: 5.45 oz (155 g)
- Operating system: Android 2.2 Froyo (upgradable to 2.3.3)
- CPU: 800MHz Qualcomm Snapdragon S2
- Memory: 512 MB RAM
- Removable storage: 8 GB microSD card included; support for 32 GB
- Battery: 1460 mAh Li–ion, use: up to 450 min., standby: up to 270 hrs
- Rear camera: 5 MP, autofocus, LED flash, dedicated key
- Display: 3.6 in (91 mm) touchscreen, 480x800 WVGA LCD, pixel size: 0.003809 in (0.09675 mm), 262.5ppi
- Media: Audio: MIDI, EVRC, EVRCB, AMR, MP3, AAC, AAC+, eAAC+, MPEG4, WMA; Video: MPEG4, H263/264 streaming
- Connectivity: Wi-Fi 802.11 b/g/n, mobile hotspot capable, Bluetooth v2.1 +EDR
- Data inputs: Virtual QWERTY keyboard, microphone
- Hearing aid compatibility: M4/T4
- Other: Headset: 3.5 mm audio jack

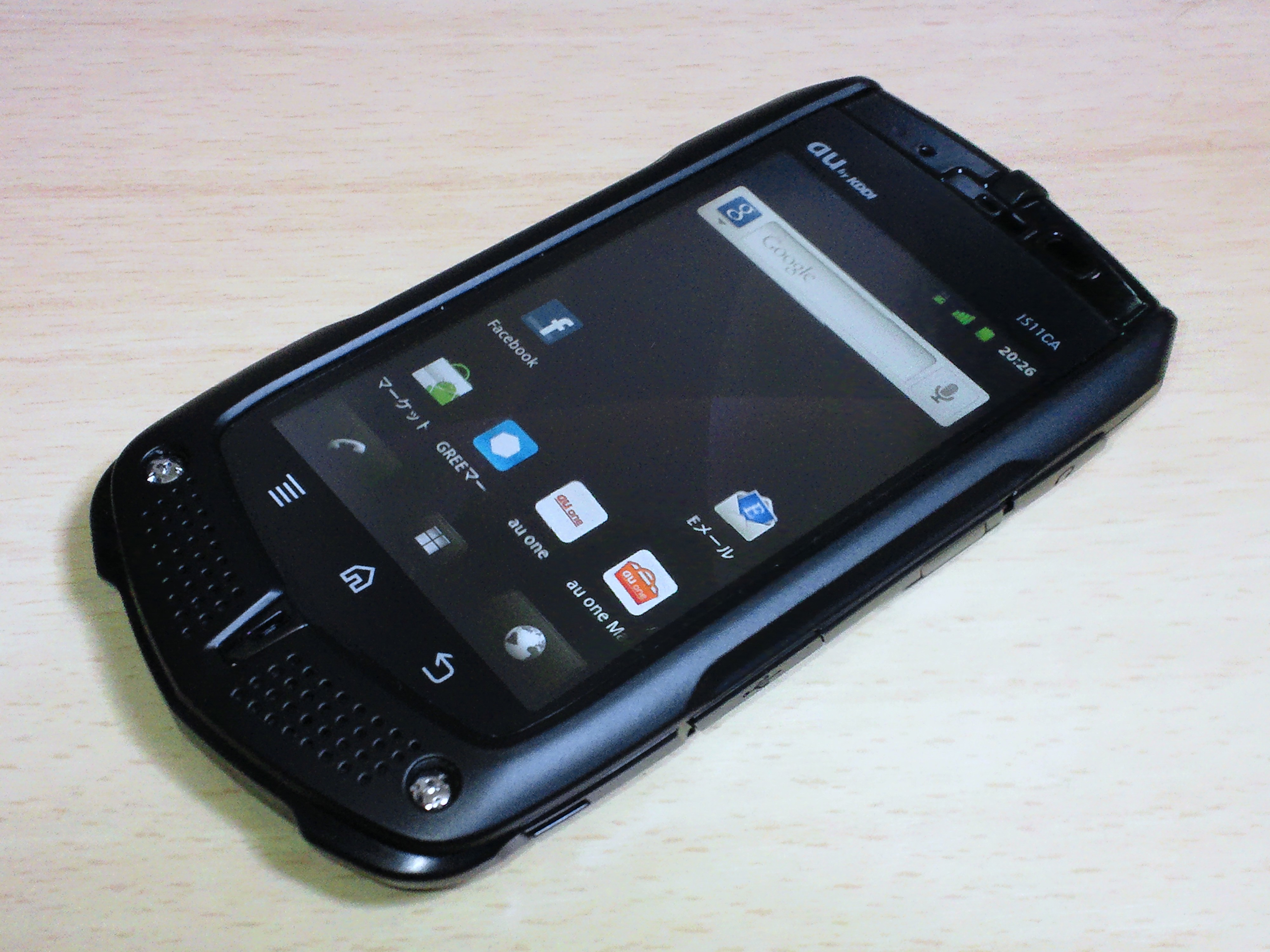

The Casio G'zOne Commando is a smartphone which is ruggedized and runs the Android operating system. It is made by NEC Casio Mobile Communications, a joint venture of three Japanese electronics makers: NEC, Casio and Hitachi. It was first released by Verizon in the United States on 28 April 2011.

Its main selling feature is that it is ruggedized to military standard MIL-STD-810G. As of May 2011, it is the first retail-available smartphone so certified. Thus, it is stronger and more durable than normal consumer electronics, similar in concept to the Motorola DEFY, but certified tougher. The phone should be able to handle drops, spills and dirt that accompany physically demanding activities such as those in harsh work environments or outdoors. At one publication, technicians tested this phone and more recently, the updated model, G'zOne Commando 4G LTE. They found both models "rugged"; and describe no ill effects after randomly dropping G'zOne Commando 4G LTE, and submerging it under water for half an hour.

The phone was released with the Android 2.2.1 Froyo operating system, but an upgrade to Android 2.3.3 Gingerbread is available.

Some reviewers have criticized the phone's styling and aesthetics as unattractive.

== See also ==
- Casio
- Samsung i847 Rugby Smart
