= Samsung SGH-A657 (AT&T) =

Mobile phone model

The Samsung SGH-A657 is a "rugged" Samsung bar phone for AT&T. The phone has various features, including resistance to dust, shock, vibration, moisture, and falls. Push To Talk (PTT) is also supported, along with a small LED flashlight and a task manager button.

Featured prominently, with its own keypad button, AT&T's pre-installed Navigator GPS program. MP3 and web browsing capability are also included on the approximately 4 ounce device.
