= Samsung Galaxy NX =

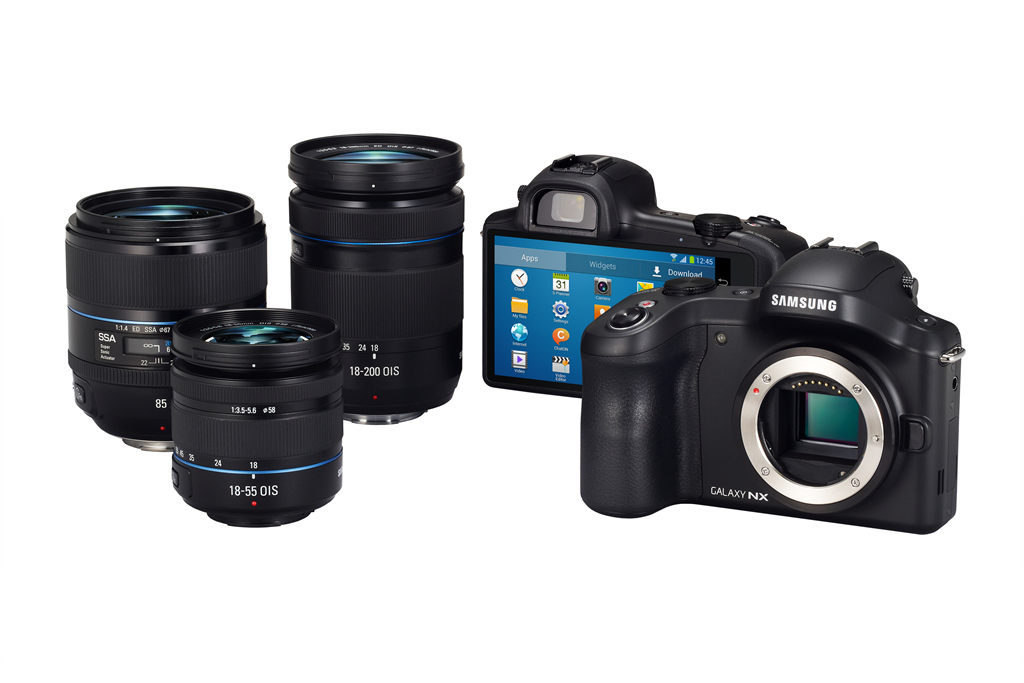

Overview
- Maker: Samsung Electronics
- Type: Mirrorless interchangeable-lens camera with Digital SLR camera-shape
- Released: June 2013

Lens
- Lens: Interchangeable (Samsung NX-mount)

Sensor/medium
- Sensor: 20.3 megapixel APS-C CMOS image sensor
- Maximum resolution: 20.3 megapixels
- Film speed: ISO 100 to 3200
- Storage media: 16 GB, expanded via micro-SD/SDHC/SDXC up to 64 GB

Focusing
- Focus modes: Autofocus (single, continuous), manual focus
- Focus areas: Contrast-detect 1 point AF (free selection), 15-area-focusing (normal) / 35-area-focusing (close up), face detection (max. 10 faces)

Exposure/metering
- Exposure metering: 221-segment TTL

Flash
- Flash: Built-in pop-up flash, 11 Guide Number at ISO 100

Shutter
- Shutter: Electronically controlled vertical-run focal plane shutter
- Shutter speed range: 1/6000 to 30 sec. and bulb (up to 4 minutes)
- Continuous shooting: 8 fps up to 11 JPEG or 8 RAW frames, 3 fps up to 15 frames (JPEG)

Viewfinder
- Viewfinder: EVF color display, 100% field of view, 0.68x (35 mm equiv), 1.04x magnification, with 1.44M dots equivalent; and 640k dots Pentile AMOLED OCR articulated multi-angle 3-inch (76 mm) color display

Image processing
- WB bracketing: Yes

General
- LCD screen: 4.8 inch HD TFT-LCD SVGA EVF
- Battery: 4360 mAh
- Dimensions: 136.5×101.46×56 mm (5.374×3.994×2.205 in)
- Weight: 495 g (17 oz)

The Samsung Galaxy NX is a hybrid mirrorless interchangeable lens camera manufactured by Samsung, announced in June 2013. The Galaxy NX is an Android (4.2.2, upgradeable to Android Jelly Bean MR1) based mobile device which is the first of its kind. It is a 20.3 megapixel camera using the Samsung NX-mount that features Wi-Fi, 3G connectivity, and a GPS receiver by which the camera can make geotagged photographs.

While the device runs on Android, it is not a smartphone in the sense that it does not have a telephone function. Instead, its wireless connectivity can be used for telecommunication (including video) over the Internet.

Included software allows for in-camera organizing, editing and online sharing or storage of images and videos. As with other Android devices, other software can be downloaded from Google Play.

The device has a "familiar DSLR look", with a larger LCD touchscreen than is customary for that category but fewer buttons and dials. The touchscreen and voice control are used primarily for controlling the camera.

The device has one processor for Android and another, DRIMe IV, for photographic processing.

The Samsung Galaxy NX was discontinued in 2017.

Level	2010		2011	2012	2013		2014	2015
High-End								NX1
Advanced	NX10		NX11	NX20			NX30	
Mid-range		NX100	NX200	NX210	NX300		NX300M	NX500
Mid-range							Galaxy NX	
Upper-entry						NX2000	NX3000	NX3300
Entry-level	NX5			NX1000	NX1100			
Compact-entry							NX mini	NX mini 2
