= Samsung i847 Rugby Smart =

Smartphone by Samsung

Samsung Rugby Smart
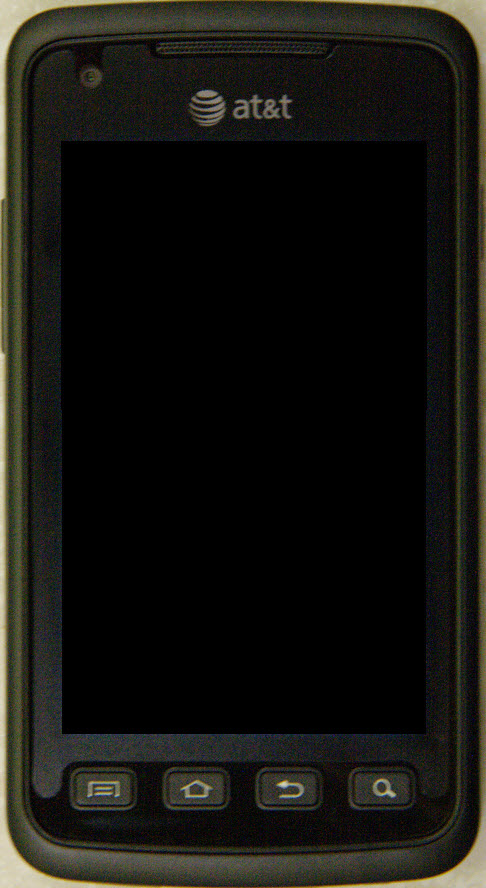
- Samsung Rugby Smart with screen protector
- Manufacturer: Samsung Electronics
- Type: Smartphone
- Series: Samsung Rugby
- First released: United States March 2012; 14 years ago
- Discontinued: October 2012
- Predecessor: Samsung Rugby II
- Successor: Samsung Galaxy Rugby Pro
- Related: Samsung Galaxy W
- Compatible networks: AT&T Mobility
- Form factor: Bar
- Dimensions: 122.4 mm (4.82 in) H 65.9 mm (2.59 in) W 12.2 mm (0.48 in) D
- Weight: 125 g (4.4 oz)
- Operating system: Android 2.3 "Gingerbread"; Unofficial: Android 4.0.4 "Ice Cream Sandwich"/Android 4.1.2 "Jelly Bean" via CyanogenMod
- System-on-chip: Qualcomm Scorpion
- CPU: 1400 MHz Qualcomm Scorpion, ARM7
- GPU: Qualcomm Adreno 205
- Memory: 512 MiB LPDDR2 SDRAM
- Removable storage: microSDHC
- Rear camera: 5.04 MP (2592×1944 px max.); Auto focus LED flash Video recording (3GP or MPEG4)
- Front camera: 1.31 MP (1280×1024 px max.); Video recording (3GP)
- Connectivity: 802.11n
- Model: SGH-i847
- Other: IP67
- Website: www.samsung.com/us/mobile/phones/all-other-phones/samsung-rugby-sgh-i847zkaatt/

The Samsung Rugby Smart (SGH-i847) was a ruggedized Android-based smartphone manufactured by Samsung, for use on the AT&T Mobility network. The phone was 3.5G capable, but lacked LTE support. It was dust and vibration resistant, as well as waterproof to a depth of 1 meter (3.3 ft) for 30 minutes, earning the phone an ingress protection rating of IP67.

== Reception ==
The Samsung Rugby Smart was rated 4 stars out of 5 by PC Magazine and selected as their Editors' Choice. Phone Arena scored it 7½ out of 10. CNET rated the smartphone 3½ stars out of 5.

== Samsung Galaxy Rugby Pro ==
In October 2012, Samsung and AT&T announced the Samsung Galaxy Rugby Pro (SGH-i547), a successor to the Rugby Smart that includes similar durability and also ships with a scratch-resistant screen, something its previous model lacked. This rugged smartphone has passed military specification tests, like surviving blowing rain and sand, high humidity, and thermal shock. It comes with the push-to-talk features, but has LTE capability and a faster 1.5 GHz processor running Android 4.0 Ice Cream Sandwich.

== Image gallery ==
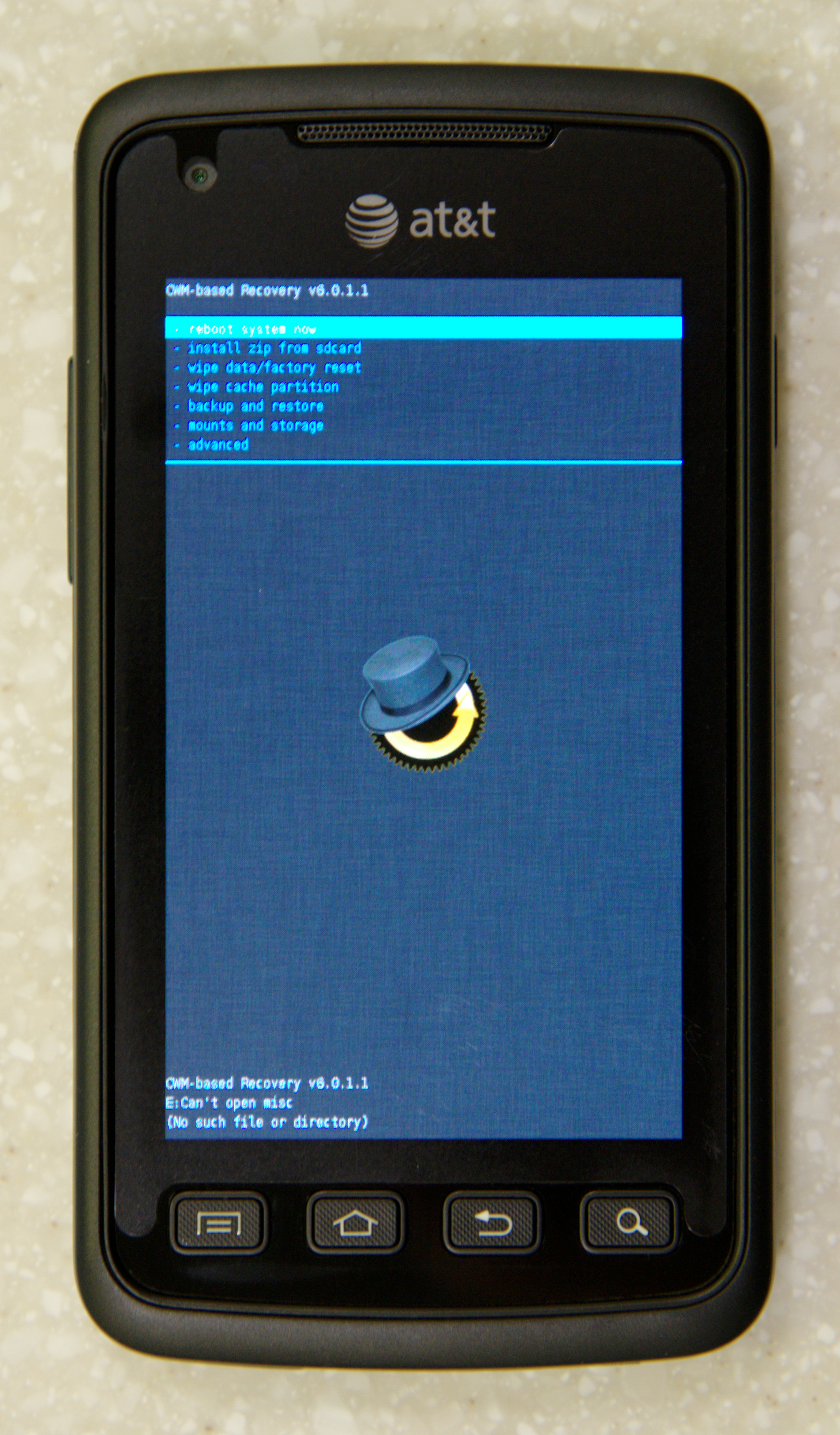
ClockworkMod Recovery main menu

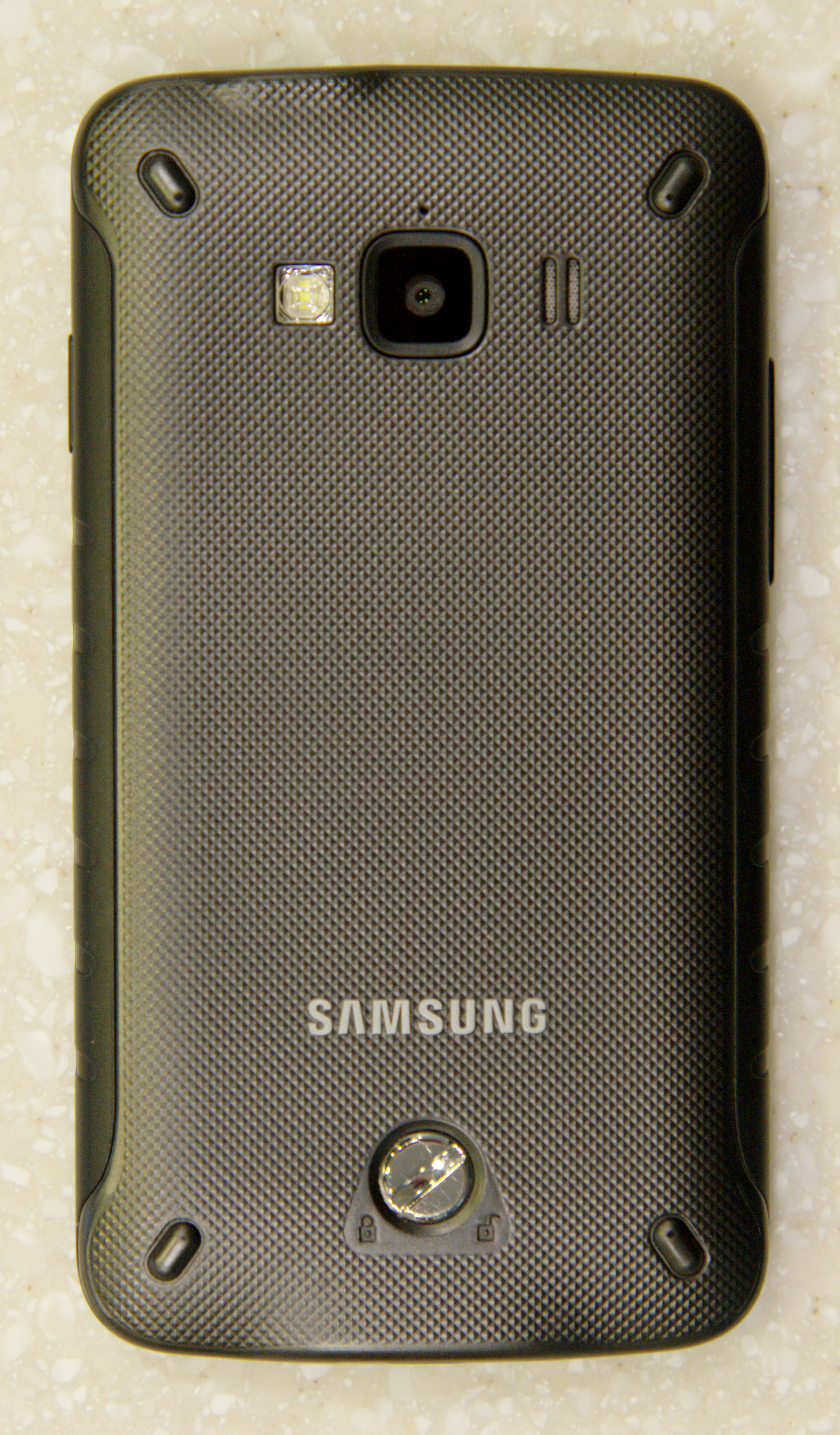
Back

== See also ==
- Casio G'zOne Commando
- Samsung Galaxy
- Samsung Rugby
