= Samsung Galaxy A80 =

2019 smartphone from Samsung

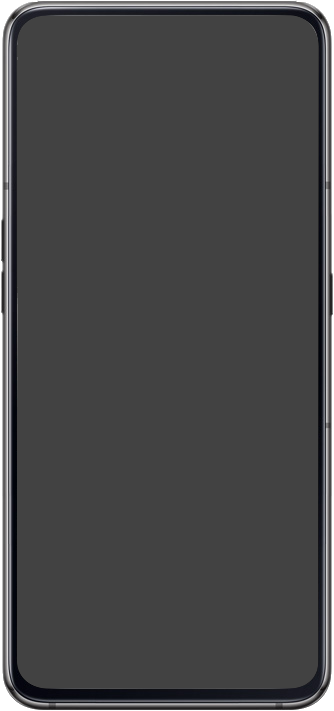
- Brand: Samsung
- Manufacturer: Samsung Electronics
- Type: Phablet
- Series: Galaxy A series
- First released: May 29, 2019; 7 years ago
- Predecessor: Samsung Galaxy A9 (2018); Samsung Galaxy A8/A8+/A8 Star
- Successor: Samsung Galaxy S10 Lite; Samsung Galaxy S20 FE; Samsung Galaxy A52s 5G; Samsung Galaxy A82 5G
- Related: Samsung Galaxy A10; Samsung Galaxy A20; Samsung Galaxy A30; Samsung Galaxy A40; Samsung Galaxy A50; Samsung Galaxy A60; Samsung Galaxy A70; Samsung Galaxy A90 5G
- Form factor: Slate
- Dimensions: 165.2×76.5×9.3 mm (6.50×3.01×0.37 in)
- Weight: 219 g (8 oz)
- Operating system: Original: Android 9.0 "Pie" with One UI 1.1; Current: Android 11 with One UI 3.1
- System-on-chip: Qualcomm Snapdragon 730
- CPU: Octa-core (2x 2.2GHz Kryo 470 Gold + 6x 1.7GHz Kryo 470 Silver)
- GPU: Adreno 618
- Memory: 8 GB RAM
- Storage: 128 GB / 256 GB
- Removable storage: None
- Battery: 3700 mAh
- Rear camera: Triple 48 MP (f/2.0) + 8 MP Ultrawide (f/2.2, 12 mm) + ToF sensor, LED flash, panorama, HDR, PDAF
- Display: 6.7" Super AMOLED FHD+ 2400x1080px (20:9 Aspect Ratio) 393 ppi
- Media: MP4/WMV/H.264 player; MP3/WAV/WMA/eAAC+/FLAC player
- Connectivity: 802.11 a/b/g/n/ac, Wi-Fi hotspot; Bluetooth v5.0, A2DP, EDR; USB-C 2.0
- Data inputs: Fingerprint (Under display, Optical), accelerometer, gyro, proximity, compass
- Model: SM-A805F
- SAR: Head: 0.30 W/Kg; Body: 0.71 W/Kg
- Hearing aid compatibility: (M4/T3)
- Website: Official website

The Samsung Galaxy A80 is a mid-range Android-based smartphone manufactured by Samsung Electronics as part of its fifth-generation Galaxy A series lineup. Running on the Android 11-based One UI 3.1 software, it was launched at the Samsung Galaxy Event in Bangkok, Thailand on April 10, 2019, and released on May 29, 2019. Its most notable feature is its lack of a front facing camera, opting instead for a unique pop-up camera, allowing for a nearly bezel-less display.

== Specifications ==
=== Design ===
Similar to that of the Galaxy A90 5G, it features an aluminum frame, glass back (protected with Corning Gorilla Glass 6), and glass front (protected with Corning Gorilla Glass 3).

Galaxy A80
- Phantom Black
- Ghost White
- Angel Gold

=== Hardware ===
==== Display ====
The Galaxy A80 has a 6.7-inch full-HD+ (2400x1080 pixels) Super AMOLED "New Infinity Display" with a 20:9 aspect ratio. It is the first and only Samsung phone that doesn't use a notch or a punch-hole display.

==== Battery ====
The phone also comes with a 3700 mAh battery and 25W Super Fast Charging technology.

==== Processor and memory ====
The phone is powered by the then-newly unveiled Snapdragon 730 SoC, an octa-core processor. It was available in only one configuration, featuring 8GB of RAM and 128GB of internal storage. It is the first among the Galaxy Ax0 lineup to not feature a microSD card slot.

==== Camera ====
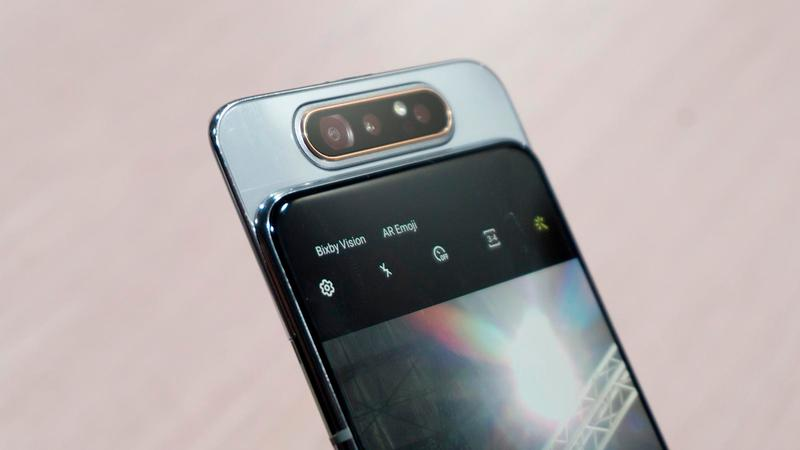
The camera module in selfie mode

The Samsung Galaxy A80 is equipped with a triple-camera array consisting of a main 48-megapixel camera, flanked by an ultrawide 8-megapixel camera, and a ToF sensor. It also introduced a rotating camera; the back facing camera slides up and rotates forward automatically when put in selfie mode.

=== Software ===
The Samsung Galaxy A80 has Android 9.0 (Pie) with One UI 1.0 pre-installed.

	Pre-installed OS	OS Upgrades history		End of support
	Pre-installed OS	1st	2nd	End of support
A80	Android 9 Pie (One UI 1.0)	Android 10 (One UI 2.0); March 2020	Android 11 (One UI 3.1); March 2021	Around 2023

== Reception ==
John McCann from TechRadar enjoyed the pop-up camera, notchless screen, and ample power and storage; however, he expressed concerns regarding its durability, a lack of a headphone jack, and the build's thick grip. Overall, he said: "Don't be put off by the pop-up, rotating camera gimmick. It's fun to use, but the Samsung Galaxy A80 looks to be much more than just a one-trick pony."
