= Samsung Galaxy A31 =

Mid-range Android smartphone from Samsung

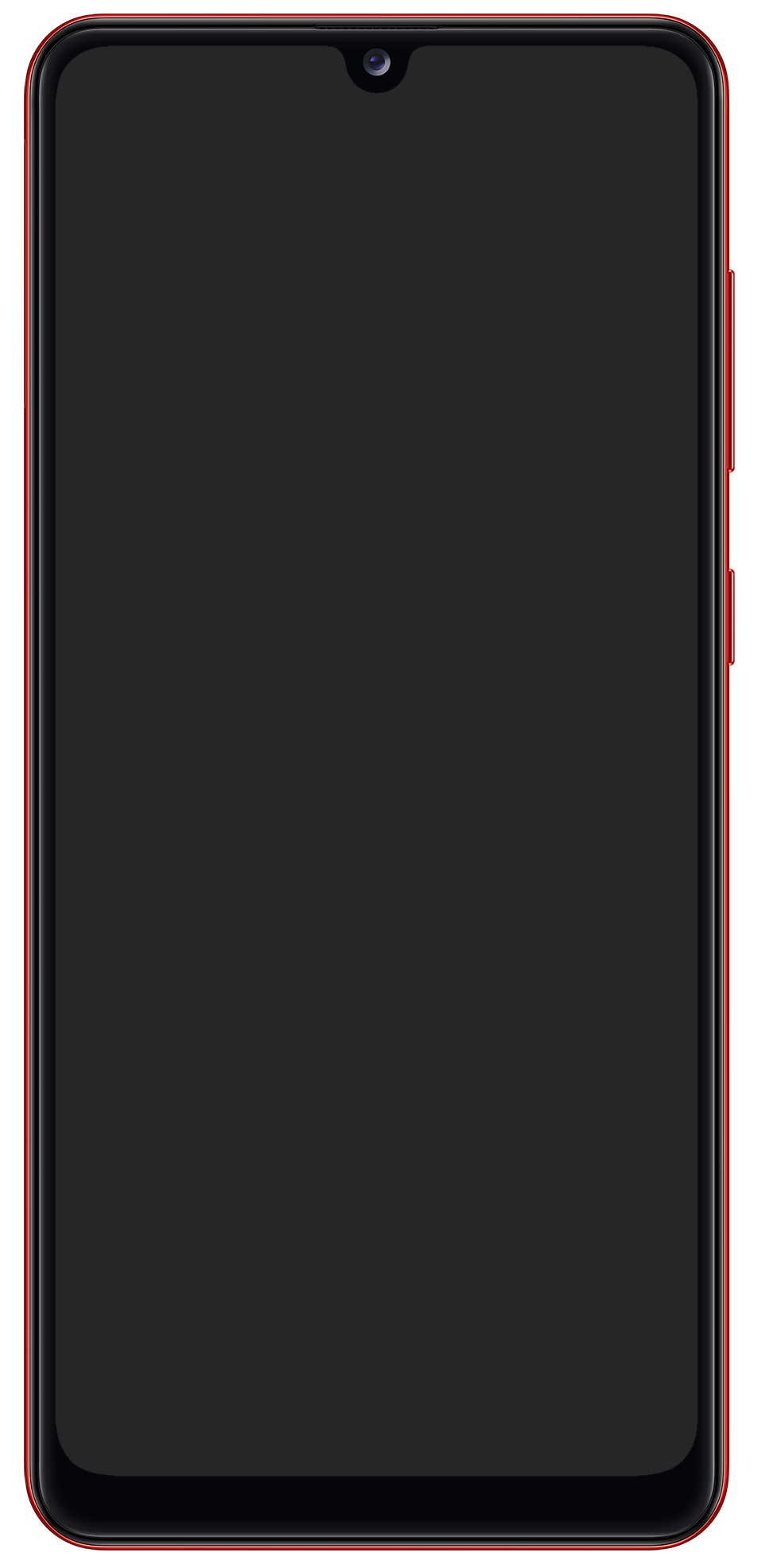
- Brand: Samsung
- Manufacturer: Samsung Electronics
- Type: Smartphone
- Series: Samsung Galaxy A series
- First released: 27 April 2020; 6 years ago
- Predecessor: Samsung Galaxy A30
- Successor: Samsung Galaxy A32; Samsung Galaxy A41
- Related: Samsung Galaxy A11; Samsung Galaxy A21; Samsung Galaxy A51; Samsung Galaxy A71
- Dimensions: 159.3 x 73.1 x 8.6 mm (6.27 x 2.88 x 0.34 in)
- Weight: 185 g (6.53 oz)
- Operating system: Original: Android 10 with One UI 2.1; Current: Android 12 with One UI 4.1
- System-on-chip: MediaTek Helio P65 (MT6768)
- CPU: Octa-core (2x2.0 GHz Cortex-A75 & 6x1.7 GHz Cortex-A55)
- GPU: Mali-G52 MC2
- Memory: 4, 6, 8, 12 GB RAM
- Storage: 64 and 128 GB
- Removable storage: microSDXC, expandable up to 512 GB
- Battery: 5000 mAh
- Charging: Fast charging at 15W
- Rear camera: 48 MP, f/2.0, 26mm, PDAF (wide); 8 MP, f/2.2, 123˚ (ultrawide); 5 MP, f/2.4 (macro); 5 MP, f/2.4 (depth)
- Front camera: 20 MP, f/2.2 (wide)
- Display: 6.4" FHD Super AMOLED Display (411ppi)
- Website: Official website

The Samsung Galaxy A31 is a mid-range Android-based smartphone developed by Samsung Electronics as part of their 2020 Galaxy A series smartphone lineup. It was announced on March 24, 2020, and first released on April 27, 2020, as the successor to the Galaxy A30 and A30s.

== Specifications ==
=== Design ===
The device has a glass front and plastic frame which extends to the back.

Galaxy A31
- Prism Crush Black
- Prism Crush Silver
- Prism Crush Blue
- Prism Crush Red

=== Hardware ===
==== Display ====
It has a 6.4-inch, FHD+ Super AMOLED panel with a screen-to-body ratio of 84.9% and an aspect ratio of 20:9. An optical, under-display fingerprint reader replaces the rear-mounted one seen on the previous A30 models.

==== Cameras ====
The new L-shaped rear camera system (similar to the ones seen on newer Samsung phones) utilizes a quad camera setup, a 48 MP main sensor with an f/2.0 aperture, an 8 MP ultra-wide lens with a 123° field of view, and a 5 MP macro and depth camera, both with an f/2.4 aperture. A U-shaped screen cut-out houses a single 20 MP selfie camera lens. Both front and back camera systems are capable of recording at a maximum of 1080p-at-30fps videos.

==== Processor and memory ====
Similar to the Galaxy A41, it uses the MediaTek Helio P65 chipset, with RAM options at either 4 or 6 GB, and storage options of either 64 or 128 GB. The storage uses eMMC.

==== Battery ====
A large 5000 mAh battery with fast charging at 15 watts is also supported.

=== Software ===
The phone comes with Android 10 and Samsung's custom One UI 2.1 software overlay. Like its predecessor, the Galaxy A30, the phone is eligible for 4 years of security patches and two major Android upgrades.

	Pre-installed OS	OS Upgrades history		End of support
	Pre-installed OS	1st	2nd	End of support
A31	Android 10 (One UI 2.1)	Android 11 (One UI 3.1); April 2021	Android 12 (One UI 4.1); May 2022	May 2024

== Reception ==
The Samsung Galaxy A31 received mixed reviews with most reviewers acclaiming the brilliant screen, excellent battery life, software, and overall build quality. They critiqued the performance relative to the phone's main competition, the phone's poor camera quality, and the lack of a night mode and various other camera features. Reviewers were also reluctant to recommend the device considering that even in Samsung's own mid-range Galaxy A series one could get a better overall package by spending just a little more money.
