= Samsung Galaxy A71 =

2020 mid-range Android smartphone from Samsung

Samsung Galaxy A71 Samsung Galaxy A71 5G (Samsung Galaxy A Quantum (in South Korea)) Samsung Galaxy A71 5G UW

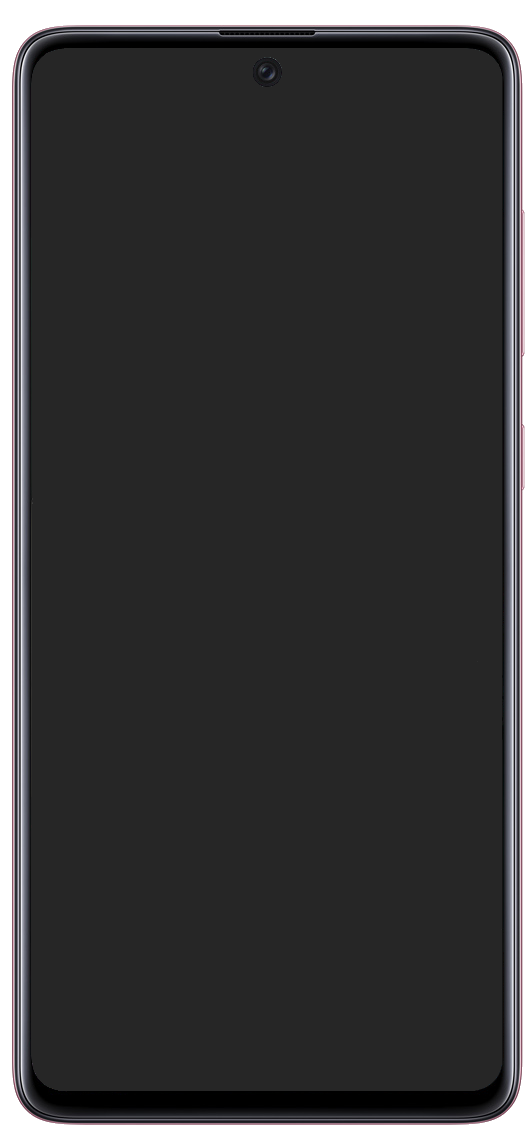
- Brand: Samsung
- Manufacturer: Samsung Electronics
- Type: Phablet
- Series: Galaxy A
- Family: Samsung Galaxy
- First released: 4G: December 2019; 6 years ago 5G: April 2020; 6 years ago 5G UW: July 2020; 6 years ago
- Availability by region: 4G: January 17, 2020; 6 years ago 5G: June 15, 2020; 6 years ago 5G UW: July 16, 2020; 6 years ago
- Predecessor: Samsung Galaxy A70; Samsung Galaxy A90 5G
- Successor: Samsung Galaxy A72; Samsung Galaxy A82 5G (Quantum2 5G); Samsung Galaxy S20 FE
- Related: Samsung Galaxy A51; Samsung Galaxy S10 Lite; Samsung Galaxy Note 10 Lite
- Compatible networks: 2G, 3G, 4G, 5G
- Form factor: bar
- Colors: Prism Crush Black, Silver, Blue, Pink
- Dimensions: 4G: 163.6 mm (6.44 in) H 76 mm (3.0 in) W 7.7 mm (0.30 in) D 5G: 162.5 mm (6.40 in) H 75.5 mm (2.97 in) W 8.1 mm (0.32 in) D
- Weight: 4G: 179 g (6.3 oz); 5G: 185 g (6.5 oz)
- Operating system: Original: LTE: Android 10 with One UI 2.0; 5G: Android 10 with One UI 2.1; Current: All: Android 13 with One UI 5.1
- System-on-chip: 4G: Qualcomm Snapdragon 730; 5G Global: Exynos 980; 5G USA: Qualcomm Snapdragon 765G
- CPU: Octa-core; 4G: 2x2.2 GHz Kryo 470 Gold & 6x1.8 GHz Kryo 470 Silver; 5G: 2x2.2 GHz Cortex-A77 & 6x1.8 GHz Cortex-A55; 5G UW: 1x2.4 GHz Kryo 475 Prime & 1x2.2 GHz Kryo 475 Gold & 6x1.8 GHz Kryo 475 Silver
- GPU: 4G: Adreno 618; 5G Global: Mali-G76 MP5; 5G USA: Adreno 620
- Memory: 6 or 8 GB RAM
- Storage: 128 GB
- Removable storage: microSDXC; 4G: Expandable up to 512 GB; 5G: Expandable up to 1 TB
- Battery: Lithium polymer (non-removable); 4500 mAh
- Charging: 25W Super Fast Charging
- Rear camera: Primary: Samsung ISOCELL Bright (S5K)GW1; 64 MP, f/1.8, 26mm, 1/1.72", 0.8μm, PDAF; Ultrawide: Hynix Hi-1336; 12 MP, f/2.2, 13mm, 123°, 1/3.0", 1.12μm; Macro: GalaxyCore GC5035; 5 MP, f/2.4, 1/5.0", 1.12μm; Depth: GalaxyCore GC5035; 5 MP, f/2.2, 1/5.0", 1.12μm; LED flash, panorama, HDR; 4K@30fps, 1080p@30/240fps, 1080p@960fps; gyro-EIS
- Front camera: Sony IMX 616; 32 MP, f/2.2, 26mm (wide), 1/2.74", 0.8μm HDR; 4K@30fps, 1080p@30fps
- Display: 6.7 in (17 cm), Infinity-O Display; Super AMOLED Plus FHD+ 1080 x 2400 pixels, 20:9 ratio (~405 ppi density); Corning Gorilla Glass 3
- External display: Always on
- Sound: Loudspeaker, 3.5mm auxiliary
- Connectivity: Wi-Fi 802.11 a/b/g/n/ac, dual-band, Wi-Fi Direct, Wi-Fi hotspot, Bluetooth 5.0
- Data inputs: USB Type-C
- Model: SM-A715x (4G); SM-A716x (5G) (last letter varies by carrier and international models)
- SAR: 0.98 W/kg (head); 0.9 W/kg (body)
- Other: Optical fingerprint sensor (in display), accelerometer, gyro, proximity, compass
- Website: Galaxy A71 5G

The Samsung Galaxy A71 is an Android-based smartphone designed, developed and manufactured by Samsung Electronics as part of its sixth-generation Galaxy A series. It was announced in December 2019 and released in January 2020, alongside the Galaxy A51. Key upgrades over the previous model, the Samsung Galaxy A70, include the Android 10 operating system, the Qualcomm Snapdragon 730 chipset, and the triple camera system.

It also had two 5G versions, with UW and without UW. The latter was announced in April 2020 and released in June 2020, while the former was announced and released in July 2020. A South Korean variant, called Samsung Galaxy A Quantum, was released in May 2020.

== Specifications ==
=== Design ===
The LTE version of the Galaxy A71 had a similar body build as its predecessor, while the 5G version now brings an aluminum frame (a first since the relaunch of the Galaxy A series in 2019) but still has the same glossy plastic back from the LTE version. The back pattern varies by variant: the LTE model features a prism crystal pattern, the 5G non-UW model has a two-tone design, and the 5G UW model having a brick-styled pattern.

Galaxy A71 LTE	Galaxy A71 5G	Galaxy A71 5G UW
Prism Crush Black; Prism Crush White; Prism Crush Pink; Prism Crush Blue	Prism Cube Black; Prism Cube Silver; Prism Cube Blue	Prism Bricks Black

The phone itself measures 163.6 mm (6.44 in) x 76 mm (3.0 in) x 7.7 mm (0.30 in) and weighs 179 g (6.3 oz) whereas the 5G variant measures 162.5 mm (6.40 in) x 75.5 mm (2.97 in) x 8.1 mm (0.32 in) and weighs 185 g (6.5 oz).

=== Hardware ===
==== Display ====
All variants of the Galaxy A71 have a 6.7-inch Super AMOLED Plus Infinity-O display with an FHD+ (1080×2400) resolution with a 20:9 aspect ratio and a ~393 ppi density with Corning Gorilla Glass 3. It also has an in-display optical fingerprint sensor.

==== Battery ====
It comes with a non-removable 4500 mAh lithium polymer battery which charges with a 25W Super Fast Charger.

==== Processor and memory ====
The LTE version of the phone is powered by a Qualcomm Snapdragon 730 chipset. The 5G (non-UW) global variant is powered by Exynos 980, while the 5G US variant uses the Qualcomm Snapdragon 765G. The phone comes with either 6 GB or 8 GB RAM, as well as 128 GB internal storage (which uses UFS 2.0), which can be expanded via a microSD card of up to 512 GB.

==== Cameras ====
The Samsung Galaxy A71 has a four-camera setup arranged in an "L" shape located in the corner with a rectangular protrusion similar to that of the iPhone 11 and the Pixel 4. The array consists of a 64 MP wide angle camera, a 12 MP ultrawide camera, a 5 MP macro camera, and a 5 MP depth sensor. It also has a single 32 MP front-facing camera, which sits in a small punch hole on the front of the screen.

The rear-facing cameras can record video up to 4K@120 fps, as well as 1080p at 120, 240, and 960 fps. The front cameras can shoot 1080p@120 fps. The rear cameras also have Super Steady EIS.

=== Software ===
All variants of the Galaxy A71 come pre-installed with Android 10 and One UI 2. On 18 August 2020, it was announced by Samsung that select Galaxy devices would be supported for three generations of Android software updates and 4 years of security updates, of which the A71 was included.

	Pre-installed OS	OS Upgrades history			End of support
	Pre-installed OS	1st	2nd	3rd	End of support
A71 LTE	Android 10 (One UI 2.0)	Android 11 (One UI 3.1); March 2021	Android 12 (One UI 4.0); March 2022	Android 13 (One UI 5.0); November 2022	March 2024
A71 5G	Android 10 (One UI 2.0)	Android 11 (One UI 3.1); February 2021	Android 12 (One UI 4.0); May 2022	Android 13 (One UI 5.0); December 2022	March 2024
A71 5G UW	Android 10 (One UI 2.0)	Android 11 (One UI 3.1); February 2021	Android 12 (One UI 4.0); May 2022	Android 13 (One UI 5.0); December 2022	March 2024
