= Samsung Galaxy A90 5G =

2019 Android phablet by Samsung Electronics

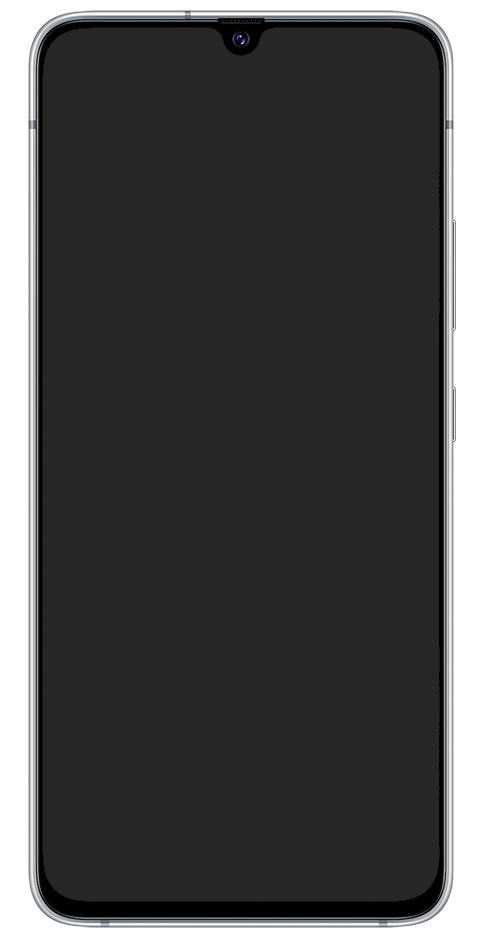
- Brand: Samsung
- Manufacturer: Samsung Electronics
- Type: Phablet
- Series: Galaxy A
- Family: Samsung Galaxy
- First released: September 3, 2019; 7 years ago
- Predecessor: Samsung Galaxy A9 (2018)
- Successor: Samsung Galaxy S10 Lite; Samsung Galaxy A71 5G (Galaxy A Quantum)
- Related: Samsung Galaxy S10; Samsung Galaxy Note 10; Samsung Galaxy A10; Samsung Galaxy A20; Samsung Galaxy A30; Samsung Galaxy A40; Samsung Galaxy A50; Samsung Galaxy A60; Samsung Galaxy A70; Samsung Galaxy A80
- Compatible networks: 2G, 3G, 4G, LTE, VoLTE, 5G Wi-Fi, Bluetooth, NFC
- Form factor: Slate
- Dimensions: 164.8 mm (6.49 in) H 76.4 mm (3.01 in) W 8.4 mm (0.33 in) D
- Weight: 206 g (7.3 oz)
- Operating system: Original: Android 9 "Pie" with One UI 1.5; Last: Android 12 with One UI 4.1
- System-on-chip: Snapdragon 855
- CPU: Octa core (1×2.84 GHz Kryo 485), (3×2.42 GHz Kryo 485) & (4×1.8 GHz Kryo 485)
- GPU: Adreno 640 GPU
- Memory: 6 or 8 GB RAM
- Storage: 128 GB
- Rear camera: 48 MP, f/2.0, 26mm (wide), 1/2.0", 0.8 μm, PDAF; 8 MP, f/2.2, 12mm (ultrawide), 1/4.0", 1.12 μm 5 MP, f/2.2, (depth); LED flash, panorama, HDR; 4K@30fps, 1080p@30/60fps (gyro-EIS), 720p@960fps
- Front camera: 32 MP, f/2.0, 25mm (wide), 1/2.8", 0.8 μm 1080p@30fps
- Display: 6.7 in (170 mm), Infinity-U Display; 1080 x 2400 pixels, 20:9 ratio (~393 ppi density); Super AMOLED, 60Hz refresh rate Corning Gorilla Glass 6 Always on
- Data inputs: Multi-touch screen USB Type-C 3.1; Sensors: Fingerprint scanner (under display, optical); Accelerometer; Gyroscope; proximity sensor; Compass
- Model: SM-A908x (Last letter varies by carrier and international models)

The Samsung Galaxy A90 5G is an Android phablet manufactured by Samsung Electronics as part of its fifth-generation Galaxy A series line-up. It was first announced on September 3, 2019. It is the first Galaxy A series phone to feature 5G connectivity, the only A9x device released under the first-generation of the relaunched Galaxy A lineup, and also the third Galaxy Ax0 device (after Galaxy A60 and Galaxy A80) that does not come with a headphone jack.

== Specifications ==
=== Design ===
An overall first for the first generation of the relaunched Galaxy A series, the A90 now features a glass back and front (both protected with Corning Gorilla Glass 6) and an aluminum frame.

Galaxy A90 5G
- Black
- White

=== Hardware ===
==== Display ====
The Galaxy A90 5G has a 6.7 in (170 mm) FHD+ (1080×2400 pixel resolution) Super AMOLED Infinity-U Display with a teardrop notch for the front camera, similar to the Galaxy A70.

==== Battery ====
The phone has a 4500 mAh battery and supports 25 W Super Fast Charging.

==== Processor and Memory ====
The phone uses the Qualcomm Snapdragon 855 SoC. It has 6 GB or 8 GB RAM versions, with 128 GB of internal storage. The 6 GB RAM variant has expandable storage support up to 512 GB via microSD card.

==== Camera ====
The phone has a triple-lens camera setup composing of a 48 MP (f/2.0) wide-angle lens, 8 MP (f/2.2) ultra-wide angle lens, and a 5 MP 3D depth sensor. It also has a 32 MP (f/2.0) front camera. The phone also can record 4K video using the main primary and front cameras.

=== Software ===
The Galaxy A90 runs on Android 9 Pie with One UI 1.0 skin, similar to other Samsung phones released in 2019. It is Samsung's first and only midrange phone to come with Samsung DeX and to be supported with 3 OS upgrades and 4 years of security updates.

	Pre-installed OS	OS Upgrades history			End of support
	Pre-installed OS	1st	2nd	3rd	End of support
A90 5G	Android 9 Pie (One UI 1.0)	Android 10 (One UI 2.0); 2020	Android 11 (One UI 3.1); March 2021	Android 12 (One UI 4.0); March 2022	October 2023

== Reception ==
Max Parker of Trusted Reviews, along with GSMArena, praised the 5G connectivity available for a lower price compared to flagship devices, while critiquing the fact that there are flagship devices without 5G available for similar or lower prices. Britta O'Boyle of Pocket Lint positively described the phone's screen, power, and 5G, recommending it for consumers considering purchasing a 5G device. TechRadar, in its hands-on review, also praised the phone's display and battery, while critiquing the weight of the device and the UI of the camera application. It also called the device one of the five best smartphones announced at the IFA 2019.
