= Samsung Galaxy A30 =

2019 mid-range smartphone by Samsung Electronics

Samsung Galaxy A30 Samsung Galaxy A30s

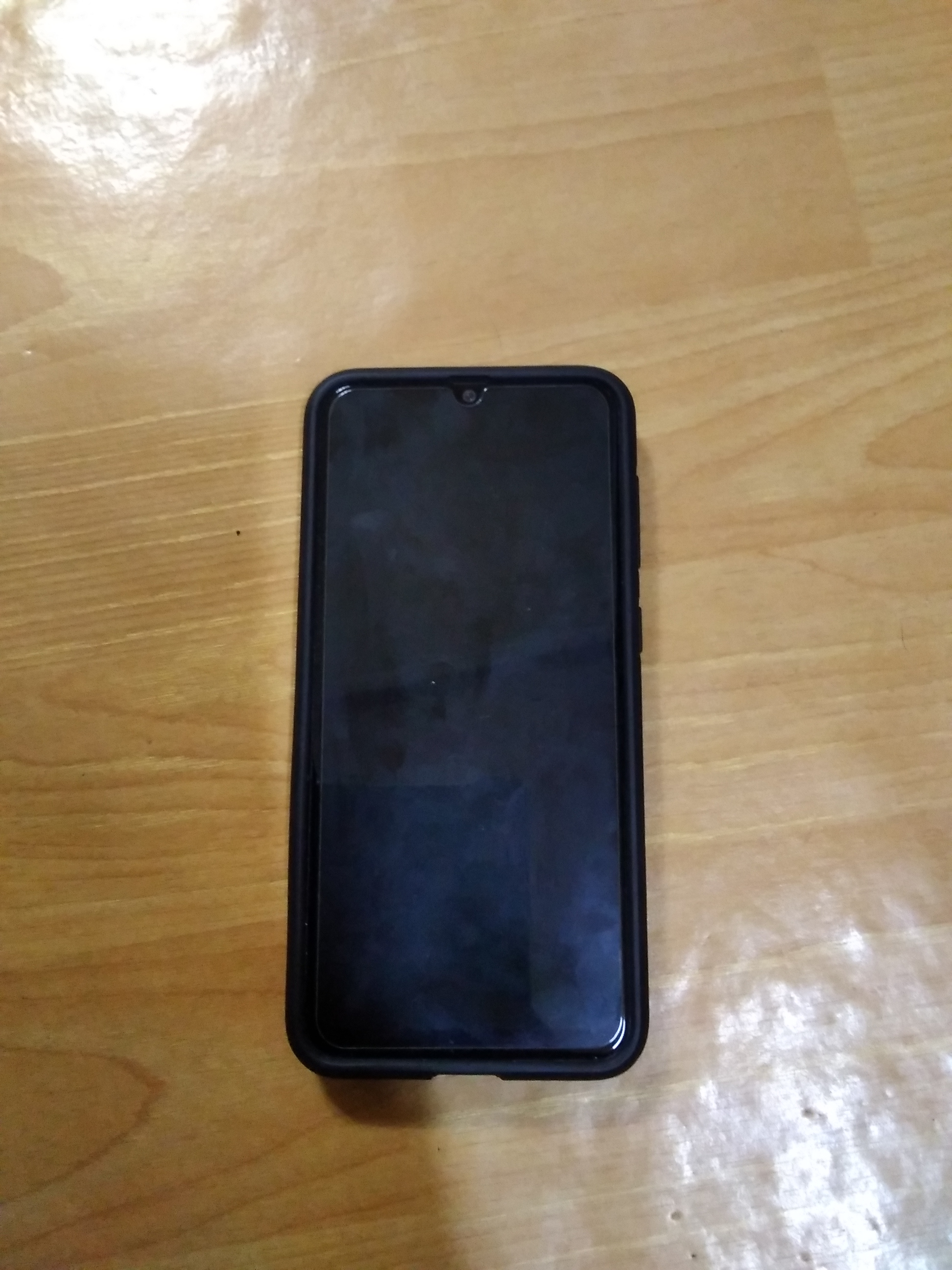
- Samsung Galaxy A30
- Brand: Samsung
- Manufacturer: Samsung Electronics
- Type: Smartphone
- Series: Galaxy A
- Family: Samsung Galaxy
- First released: A30: March 2, 2019; 7 years ago A30s: August 22, 2019; 7 years ago
- Availability by region: A30: March 2, 2019; 7 years ago India; Pakistan; March 14, 2019; 7 years ago Philippines; March 18, 2019; 7 years ago Malaysia; April 5, 2019; 7 years ago Singapore; June 6, 2019; 7 years ago Japan
- Units shipped: 9.2 million
- Predecessor: Samsung Galaxy A6 (2018); Samsung Galaxy A6+ Samsung Galaxy J8
- Successor: Samsung Galaxy A31
- Related: Samsung Galaxy S10; Samsung Galaxy Note 10; Samsung Galaxy A10; Samsung Galaxy A20; Samsung Galaxy A40; Samsung Galaxy A50; Samsung Galaxy A60; Samsung Galaxy A70; Samsung Galaxy A80; Samsung Galaxy A90 5G
- Compatible networks: 2G / 3G / 4G LTE
- Form factor: Slate
- Dimensions: A30: International: 158.5 mm (6.24 in) H 74.7 mm (2.94 in) W 7.7 mm (0.30 in) D Japan: 160 mm (6.3 in) H 75 mm (3.0 in) W 8.0 mm (0.31 in) D
- Weight: A30: International: 165 g (5.8 oz); Japan: 176 g (6.2 oz)
- Operating system: Original: Android 9.0 "Pie" with One UI 1.1; Current: Android 11 with One UI 3.1
- System-on-chip: Samsung Exynos 7 Octa 7904
- CPU: Octa-core (2x1.8 GHz Cortex-A73 & 6x1.6 GHz Cortex-A53) 64Bit (14nm) FinFET
- GPU: Mali-G71 MP2 up to 845Mhz
- Modem: LTE Modem (LTE Cat. 12 3CA 600 Mbps (DL) / Cat.13 2CA 150 Mbps (UL)
- Memory: 3, 4 GB
- Storage: 32, 64, 128 (A30s only) GB eMMC 5.1
- Removable storage: 1TB
- SIM: Dual 4G Sim, VoLTE
- Battery: International: 4000 mAh; Japan: 3900 mAh
- Charging: 15W Fast Charging
- Rear camera: International: 16 MP, f/1.7 aperture, PDAF (Wide-angle); 5 MP, f/2.2 aperture, 12mm (Ultra-wide angle); Japan: 13 MP, f/1.9 aperture, PDAF (Wide-angle); 5 MP, f/2.2 aperture, 12mm (Ultra-wide angle)
- Front camera: International: 16 MP, f/2.0 aperture Japan: 8 MP, f/2.0 aperture
- Display: 6.4 in (160 mm) Super AMOLED 1080 x 2340 px (403 ppi); 19.5:9 aspect ratio Gorilla Glass 3
- Sound: Loudspeaker
- Connectivity: Wi-Fi: 802.11 a/b/g/n/ac Wi-Fi Direct; Wi-Fi hotspot Bluetooth: 5.0; FeliCa (Japanese models only); LTE: Carrier Aggregation, LTE+
- Data inputs: Sensors: Accelerometer; Proximity sensor; Fingerprint scanner (Rear-mounted for the A30, Optical On-screen for the A30s); Gyroscope; Compass; Hall sensor
- Model: SM-A305FN; SCV43 (Japan; au)
- SAR: Head: 0.25 W/kg; Body: 1.17 W/kg
- Other: USB: 2.0, Type-C 1.0 reversible connector 3.50 mm (0.138 in) Headphone jack
- Website: Galaxy A30

The Samsung Galaxy A30 is a mid-range Android-based smartphone manufactured, developed, designed and marketed by Samsung Electronics, as part of the Galaxy A series. Running on the Android 9.0 "Pie" software, the A30 was unveiled on February 25, 2019 alongside the Samsung Galaxy A10 and Samsung Galaxy A50 at the Mobile World Congress. It was released a month later on March 2, 2019. The A30 was praised by critics for its display and user interface. However, criticism was aimed at the phone's performance, battery life and camera.

Its "s" variant was unveiled on August 22, 2019, which features an upgraded camera setup but with a downgraded screen resolution.

== Specifications ==
=== Design ===
Both devices feature a plastic back, plastic frame, and glass front (Corning Gorilla Glass 3 for the A30 only). The A30 variant sold in Japan also carries IPX5, IPX8, and IP6X ratings, marking the partial return of waterproof certification on the Galaxy A series, a feature not seen since the Galaxy A8 (2018).

Galaxy A30	Galaxy A30s
Black; White; Blue; Red	Prism Crush Black; Prism Crush White; Prism Crush Violet; Prism Crush Green

=== Hardware ===
==== Display ====
The A30 have a 6.4" FHD+ (2340 x 1080) 60 Hz Super AMOLED Infinity-U display, with an 19.5:9 aspect ratio. The A30s, however, features the same screen size and display type as the A30, though at a lower resolution (HD+, 1560 x 720) and with an Infinity-V notch.

==== Battery ====
Both devices feature the same 4000 mAh battery with 15W Fast Charging support. The A30 variant sold in Japan features a slightly lower 3900mAh battery capacity, but with the same 15W Fast Charging support.

==== Processor and memory ====
Both variants use the Samsung Exynos 7904 octa-core SoC, with RAM options of either 3 or 4 GB, and storage options ranging from 32 GB to 128 GB (the 128 GB variant is exclusive to the Galaxy A30s only). Both variants also use eMMC 5.1 for its storage type. It also support expandable storage via microSD card up to 512 GB.

==== Camera ====
The A30 has a dual-rear camera setup (similar to the Galaxy A40) consisting of a 16 MP (f/1.7) wide camera and an 5 MP (f/2.2) ultra-wide camera; it also has a 16 MP (f/2.0) front camera. The A30 model sold in Japan retains the same ultra-wide camera but features downgraded specifications for its main wide camera (13 MP, f/1.9) and front camera (8 MP).

The A30s, on the other hand, has a triple-camera setup (similar to the Galaxy A50s) consisting of a 25 MP (f/1.7) wide camera, an 8 MP (f/2.2) ultra-wide camera, and a 5 MP depth camera; it also uses the same front camera as the A30.

=== Software ===
All variants have Android 9.0 Pie and One UI 1.1 pre-installed. It was eligible for 2 OS upgrades and 4 years of security updates.

	Pre-installed OS	OS Upgrades history		End of support
	Pre-installed OS	1st	2nd	End of support
A30	Android 9 Pie (One UI 1.1)	Android 10 (One UI 2.0); February 2020	Android 11 (One UI 3.1); May 2021	April 2023
A30s	Android 9 Pie (One UI 1.1)	Android 10 (One UI 2.0); April 2020	Android 11 (One UI 3.1); June 2021	November 2023

== Reception ==
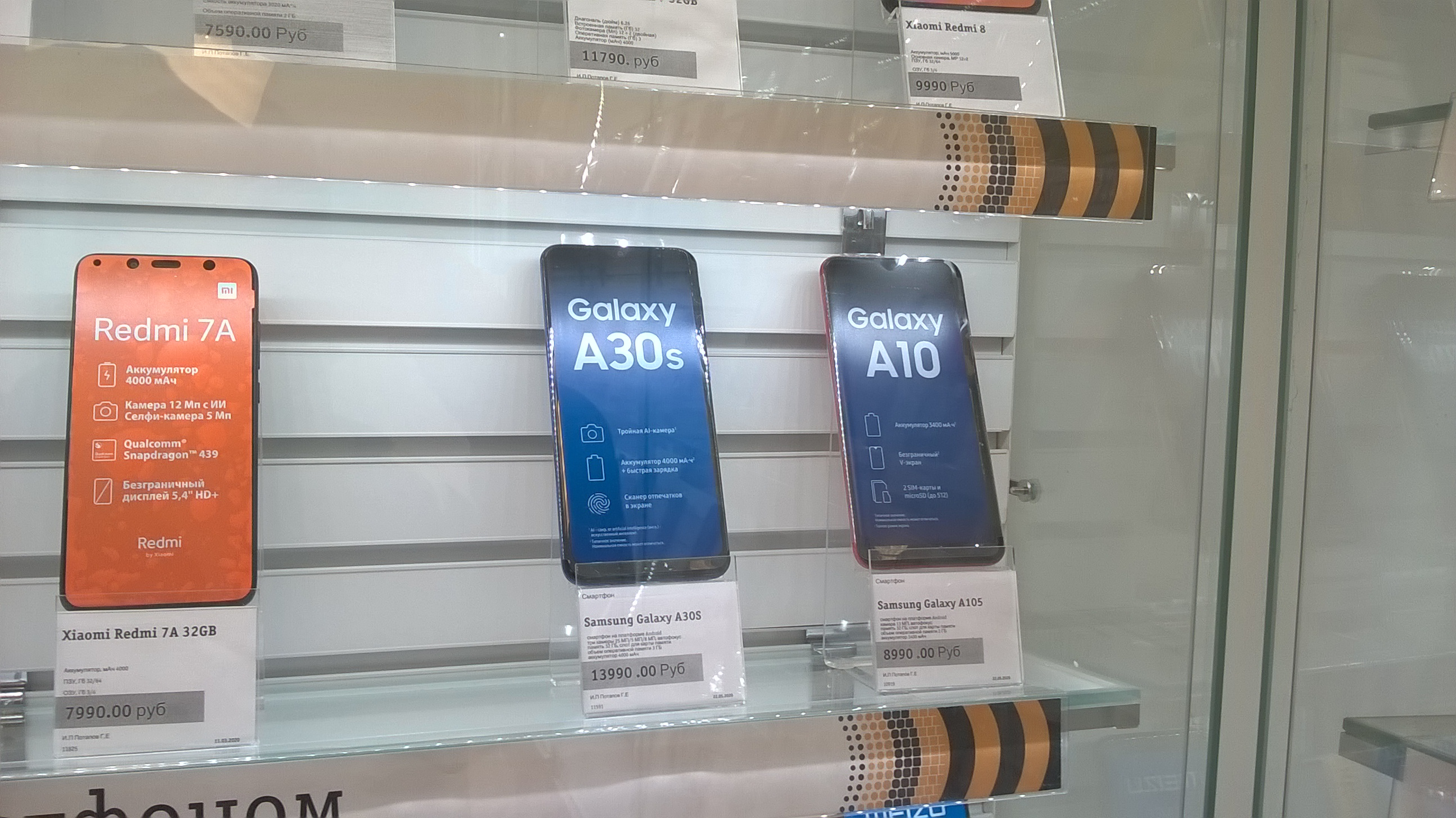
Smartphones Samsung Galaxy A30s (in the middle) and Samsung Galaxy A10 (on the right) next to Xiaomi Redmi 7A (on the left) in a Russian mobile phones shop. Photograph. May 27, 2020

Both Deepak Rajawat of smartprix and Sanket Vijayasarathy of India Today praised the Galaxy A30's display, software and battery life, but criticized the phone's chipset due to performance issues and the "average" quality camera. Tom Bedford and Matt Swider of TechRadar also complimented the vibrant screen of the A30. However, the reviewers found the phone difficult to handle due to its large size. Writing a review for 91mobiles, Shekhar Thakhan praised the phone's AMOLED display, One UI interface and battery life as well. In contrast, the back of the phone was noted by the reviewer as a "fingerprint magnet".
