= Samsung Galaxy A51 =

2019 mid-range Android smartphone from Samsung

Samsung Galaxy A51 Samsung Galaxy A51 5G

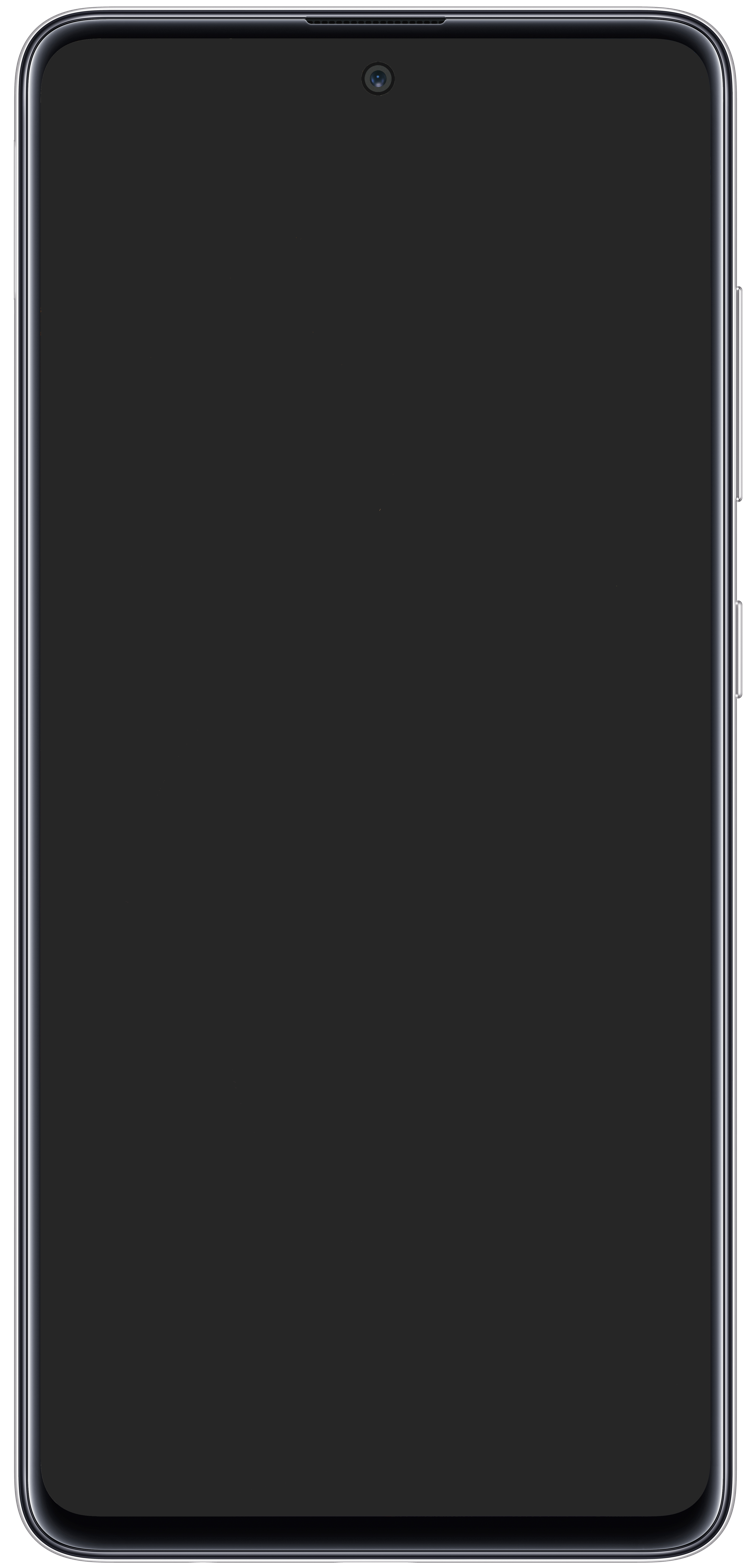
- Brand: Samsung
- Manufacturer: Samsung Electronics
- Type: Phablet
- Series: Galaxy A
- Family: Samsung Galaxy
- First released: 4G: December 16, 2019; 6 years ago
- Availability by region: 4G: December 16, 2019; 6 years ago 5G: April 29, 2020; 6 years ago 5G UW: August 14, 2020; 6 years ago
- Discontinued: April 9, 2021; 5 years ago
- Predecessor: Samsung Galaxy A50
- Successor: Samsung Galaxy A52
- Related: Samsung Galaxy A31; Samsung Galaxy A71
- Compatible networks: 2G / 3G / 4G / 5G
- Form factor: Slate
- Dimensions: 4G: 158.5 mm (6.24 in) H 73.6 mm (2.90 in) W 7.9 mm (0.31 in) D 5G: 158.9 mm (6.26 in) H 73.6 mm (2.90 in) W 8.7 mm (0.34 in) D 5G UW: 158.8 mm (6.25 in) H 73.4 mm (2.89 in) W 8.6 mm (0.34 in) D
- Weight: 4G: 172 g (6.1 oz); 5G: 187 g (6.6 oz); 5G UW: 188.8 g (6.66 oz)
- Operating system: Original: Android 10 with One UI 2.0; Current: Android 13 with One UI 5.1
- System-on-chip: 4G: Exynos 9611; 5G (International): Exynos 980; 5G (Japan)/5G UW: Qualcomm Snapdragon 765G
- CPU: Octa-core; 4G: 4x2.3 GHz Cortex-A73 & 4x1.7 GHz Cortex-A53; 5G (International): 2x2.2 GHz Cortex-A77 & 6x1.8 GHz Cortex-A55; 5G (Japan)/5G UW: 1x2.4 GHz Kryo 475 Prime & 1x2.2 GHz Kryo 475 Gold & 6x1.8 GHz Kryo 475 Silver
- GPU: 4G: Mali-G72 MP3; 5G (International): Mali-G76 MP5; 5G (Japan)/5G UW: Adreno 620
- Memory: 4G: 4, 6, or 8 GB RAM; 5G: 6 or 8 GB RAM
- Storage: 4G: 64, 128, or 256 GB; 5G: 128 GB
- Removable storage: microSDXC; 4G: Expandable up to 512 GB; 5G: Expandable up to 1 TB
- Battery: Lithium polymer (non-removable); 4G: 4000 mAh; 5G: 4500 mAh
- Charging: 15W Fast Charging
- Rear camera: 48 MP, f/2.0, 26mm (wide), 1/2.0", 0.8μm, PDAF; 12 MP, f/2.2, 123° (ultrawide); 5 MP, f/2.4, (macro); 5 MP, f/2.4, (depth); LED flash, panorama, HDR 4K@30fps, 1080p@30/120fps; gyro-EIS
- Front camera: 32 MP, f/2.2, 26mm (wide), 1/2.74", 0.8μm HDR, 4K@30fps, 1080p@30fps
- Display: 6.5 in (17 cm) Super AMOLED FHD+ 1080 x 2400 pixels, 20:9 ratio (~405 ppi density)
- Sound: Loudspeaker, 3.5 mm auxiliary (headphone jack)
- Connectivity: Wi-Fi 802.11 a/b/g/n/ac, dual-band, Wi-Fi Direct, Wi-Fi hotspot, Bluetooth 5.0; FeliCa (Japanese models only)
- Data inputs: USB Type-C
- Model: International models: SM-A515x (4G); SM-A516x (5G) (last letter varies by carrier and international models); Japanese models: SCG07 (au, 5G); SC-54A (NTT Docomo, 5G)
- SAR: 0.80 W/kg (head); 0.67 W/kg (body)
- Other: Optical fingerprint sensor (in display), accelerometer, gyro, proximity, compass
- Website: Galaxy A51

The Samsung Galaxy A51 is a mid-range Android-based smartphone manufactured, developed and marketed by Samsung Electronics as part of its Galaxy A series. It was announced on December 12, 2019, and released on December 16, 2019.

Like the Galaxy A71, it also had two 5G versions: with UW and without UW. The latter was announced in April 2020, while the former was announced and released in August 2020.

== Specifications ==
=== Design ===
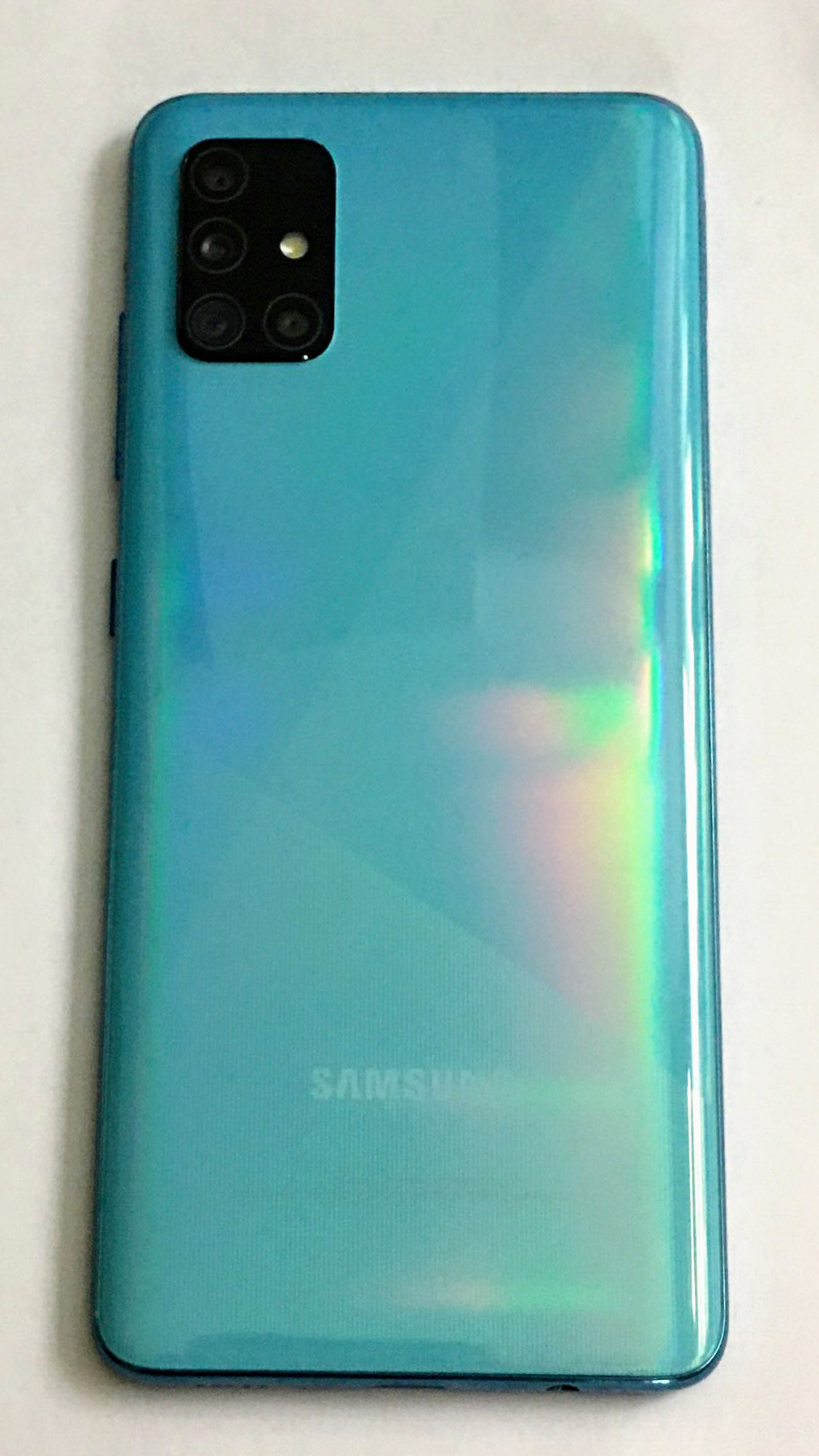
Backside of a Galaxy A51 in Prism Crush Blue

Similar to the Galaxy A71, it features a plastic back and plastic frame for the LTE variant, while the 5G variants feature an aluminum frame and a plastic back. The back pattern varies by variant: the LTE model features a prism crystal pattern, the 5G non-UW model has a two-tone design, and the 5G UW model having a brick-styled pattern.

Galaxy A51 LTE	Galaxy A51 5G	Galaxy A51 5G UW
Prism Crush Black; Prism Crush White; Prism Crush Pink; Prism Crush Blue	Prism Cube Black; Prism Cube White; Prism Cube Pink	Prism Bricks Blue

=== Hardware ===
==== Display ====
All variants of the Galaxy A51 have a 6.5 in Super AMOLED Infinity O display with an FHD+ 1080 × 2400 pixel resolution, a 20:9 aspect ratio, and a pixel density of ~405 PPI. The front glass is constructed of Corning Gorilla Glass 3.

==== Cameras ====
All variants have a quad camera setup arranged in an "L" shape located in the corner with a rectangular protrusion. The array consists of a 48 MP wide angle camera, a 12 MP ultrawide camera, a 5 MP macro camera, and a 5 MP depth sensor. It also has a single 32 MP front facing camera, which sits in a small punch hole on the front of the screen.

Both the front and rear facing cameras can record video up to 4K@30 fps, as well as 1080p@30/120 fps.

==== Processor and memory ====
The LTE variant is powered by the Samsung Exynos 9611 octa-core SoC, the 5G non-UW variant is powered by the Samsung Exynos 980 SoC, and the 5G UW variant is powered by the Qualcomm Snapdragon 765G SoC.

RAM options vary from 4 GB to 8 GB for the LTE variant and 6 GB or 8 GB for the 5G variants. Storage options for the LTE variant are available in either 64 or 128 GB, while the 5G variants are only available in 128 GB. Storage can be expanded with a microSD card up to 512 GB.

==== Battery ====
It comes with a non-removable 4000 mAh (for the LTE variant) or 4500 mAh (for the 5G variants) lithium polymer battery and 15 W Fast Charging.

=== Software ===
All variants of the Galaxy A51 originally came with Android 10 and One UI 2.0. On 18 August 2020, Samsung announced that all variants of the Galaxy A51 would be supported for three generations of Android software updates, and 4 years of security updates. It also became one of the first Galaxy A series device (alongside Galaxy A71 and Galaxy A90 5G) to have a longer software support.

	Pre-installed OS	OS Upgrades history			End of support
	Pre-installed OS	1st	2nd	3rd	End of support
A51 LTE	Android 10 (One UI 2.0)	Android 11 (One UI 3.0); February 2021 (One UI 3.1); March 2021	Android 12 (One UI 4.1); March 2022	Android 13 (One UI 5.0); December 2022	February 2024
A51 5G	Android 10 (One UI 2.0)	Android 11 (One UI 3.0); February 2021 (One UI 3.1); March 2021	Android 12 (One UI 4.1); March 2022	Android 13 (One UI 5.0); December 2022 (One UI 5.1); March 2023	February 2024
A51 5G UW	Android 10 (One UI 2.0)	Android 11 (One UI 3.0); February 2021 (One UI 3.1); March 2021	Android 12 (One UI 4.1); March 2022	Android 13 (One UI 5.0); December 2022 (One UI 5.1); March 2023	February 2024

== Reception ==
TechRadar praised the Galaxy A51 for its OLED screen and the presence of a headphone jack, but criticized its relatively poor performance and unreliable fingerprint sensor.
