= Upday =

News aggregator application developed by Axel Springer SE and Samsung Electronics

- Developer: Axel Springer SE
- Release: 2016
- Operating system: Android, iOS, World Wide Web
- Type: News aggregator
- License: Proprietary software
- Website: www.upday.com

Upday (stylised upday) is an online news aggregator developed by publisher Axel Springer SE, maintained by Upday, based in Berlin, Germany. It was originally made in cooperation with Samsung Electronics and shipped as an app with most Samsung Galaxy devices sold in Europe In 2020, Upday had more than 25 million monthly users and claims to be the most popular news application in Europe. At the end of 2023, the Samsung partnership ended and Axel Springer turned Upday into an AI-driven news platform.

== History ==
Upday was first released in March 2016 preinstalled on the Galaxy S7 and S7 Edge in France, Poland, Britain and Germany. At the time of publication, it collected news from 1,200 platforms such as Le Figaro, Der Spiegel and BBC News. In February 2017, Upday had 8 million unique users per month. The service was also expanded further into Europe with the release of Galaxy S8.

The availability of Upday was also diversified from Galaxy S devices to support Galaxy A and J series.

The app had 25 million monthly users, with 4,000 news platform sources, in 2019. Samsung took a minority share in the company through SAMAS upday Investment GmbH.

With the release of Galaxy S20, the service was expanded to 18 additional countries, mainly in Eastern Europe. Exclusivity for Samsung Galaxy products ended in April 2021 as it became available across the board on Android. It was then also released for iOS.

In December 2023, Axel Springer ended its partnership with Samsung. Upday relaunched as a “new trend news generator”.

== Samsung application ==
Upday could be opened on Galaxy smartphones by swiping to the right. The app has two types of news preparation: firstly, the Top News topics, which are compiled by the editors, and the My News topics, which are adapted to user preferences and are determined by an algorithm. The news is presented on cards.

Samsung refrigerators with a display on the door also have an Upday message stream.

Upday was also integrated in Samsung Free/Samsung O, a "one stop" content app for Galaxy devices that launched in 2020 replacing Samsung Daily feed. Samsung Free was replaced by a new Samsung News app in 2023 at least in the US and includes news syndicated from Upday.

== See also ==
- Google News
- Apple News
- MSN News
