= Samsung Galaxy A82 5G =

2021 smartphone from Samsung

Samsung Galaxy A82 5G (Samsung Galaxy Quantum 2 in South Korea)
- Brand: Samsung Galaxy
- Manufacturer: Samsung
- Type: Smartphone
- Series: Samsung Galaxy A series
- First released: July 2021
- Predecessor: Samsung Galaxy A80; Samsung Galaxy A Quantum
- Successor: Samsung Galaxy Quantum 3
- Compatible networks: 2G / 3G / 4G LTE / 5G
- Form factor: bar
- Dimensions: 161.9 mm (6.37 in) H 73.8 mm (2.91 in) W 8.1 mm (0.32 in) D
- Weight: 176 g (6.2 oz)
- Operating system: Original: Android 11 with One UI 3.1; Current: Android 14 with One UI 6.1
- System-on-chip: Qualcomm SM8150 Snapdragon 855+ (7 nm), BELA security
- CPU: Octa-core (1x2.96 GHz Kryo 485 & 3x2.42 GHz Kryo 485 & 4x1.78 GHz Kryo 485)
- GPU: Adreno 640 (700 MHz)
- Memory: 6GB RAM
- Storage: 128GB
- Removable storage: microSDXC
- SIM: Nano-SIM
- Battery: Li-Po 4500 mAh
- Charging: 25W fast charging
- Rear camera: Primary: 64 MP, f/1.8, 26mm, 1/1.72", 0.8µm, PDAF, OIS; Ultrawide: 12 MP, f/2.2, 123°, 1.12µm; Macro: 5 MP, f/2.4, 1/5.0", 1.12µm; LED flash, Panorama, HDR; 4K@30fps, 1080p@30/60/240fps; gyro-EIS
- Front camera: 10 MP, f/2.2, (wide); HDR; 1080p@30fps
- Display: 6.7 in (170 mm); Dynamic AMOLED 2X, 120Hz, 1200 nits (peak); 1440 x 3040 pixels, 19:9 ratio 502 ppi density
- Sound: 3.5mm Audio Jack
- Connectivity: USB Type-C 2.0; Wi-Fi 802.11 a/b/g/n/ac, dual-band, Wi-Fi Direct, hotspot Bluetooth 5.0, A2DP, LE
- Data inputs: Sensors: Fingerprint (under display, ultrasonic), accelerometer, gyro, proximity, compass

The Samsung Galaxy A82 5G is a mid-range Android-based smartphone unveiled by Samsung Electronics. The phone has a triple-camera setup with a 64 MP main camera, a 6.7 in (161.9 mm) FHD+ Infinity-O display, and a 4500 mAh Li-Po battery.

== Samsung Galaxy Quantum 2 ==
Samsung Galaxy A82 5G was released as Samsung Galaxy Quantum 2 in South Korea.

== Software ==
The phone shipped with One UI 3.1 and Android 11. On May 6, 2021, Samsung announced that the Galaxy A82 5G will have a quarterly security-patch upgrade from its launch.

Banking on Samsung's 2019–2025 update schedule, the phone should be eligible for three major Android OS upgrades.

In January 2022, Samsung began rolling out the One UI 4 update to the Galaxy A82 devices. Since then, several Galaxy devices have received the flavor of the latest software version.

Samsung Galaxy A82 got three major updates until Android 14 with One UI 6.1.
