= Samsung Galaxy A50 =

2019 smartphone from Samsung

Samsung Galaxy A50 Samsung Galaxy A50s

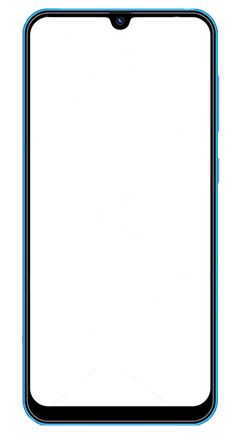
- Samsung Galaxy A50 in Blue
- Brand: Samsung
- Manufacturer: Samsung Electronics
- Type: Smartphone, phablet
- Series: Galaxy A series
- First released: February 25, 2019; 7 years ago
- Availability by region: March 13, 2019; 7 years ago (International); June 13, 2019; 7 years ago (United States)
- Units sold: 24.2 million (2019)
- Predecessor: Samsung Galaxy A8 (2018); Samsung Galaxy A7 (2018)
- Successor: Samsung Galaxy A51
- Related: Samsung Galaxy A10; Samsung Galaxy A20; Samsung Galaxy A30; Samsung Galaxy A70
- Compatible networks: 2G, 3G, 4G, LTE, VoLTE, Wi-Fi, Bluetooth
- Dimensions: 158.5 mm (6.24 in) H 74.7 mm (2.94 in) W 7.7 mm (0.30 in) D
- Weight: 166 g (5.9 oz)
- Operating system: Original: Android 9.0 "Pie" with One UI 1.1; Current: Android 11 with One UI 3.1
- System-on-chip: Exynos 9610
- CPU: Octa-core, 4xARM Cortex-A73 2.3 GHz and 4xARM Cortex-A53 1.6GHz, 64-bit, 10 nm FinFET.
- GPU: Mali-G72 MP3
- Memory: 4 GB, 6 GB
- Storage: 64 GB, 128 GB
- Removable storage: microSD card up to 512 GB
- Battery: 4000 mAh
- Rear camera: 25 MP, f1.7, Sony Exmor IMX576 Wide Angle Camera; 8MP, f2.2 Ultra Wide Angle Camera; 5MP, f2.2 Depth Sensor Camera
- Front camera: 25 MP
- Display: 163 mm (6.4 in)
- Connectivity: 802.11 a/b/g/n/ac 2.4 G+5 GHz, VHT80; Bluetooth v5 (LTE), USB-C
- Model: SM-A505F/DS; SM-A505FN/DS (Global); SM-A505GN/DS (Taiwan/Philippines); SM-A505FM/DS (Russia); SM-A505YN (Australia); SM-A505G (Latin America); SM-A505W (Canada); SM-A505U (United States); SM-A505U1
- SAR: Head: 0.340 W/kg; Body: 0.450 W/kg
- Website: www.samsung.com/us/mobile/phones/galaxy-a/galaxy-a50-verizon-sm-a505uzknvzw/

The Samsung Galaxy A50 is an Android-based smartphone manufactured by Samsung Electronics as part of its fifth-generation Galaxy A series lineup. It was launched internationally on February 25, 2019 and in the United States on July 13, 2019.

Its "s" variant was unveiled on August 22, 2019, which features an upgraded processor and cameras.

== Specifications ==
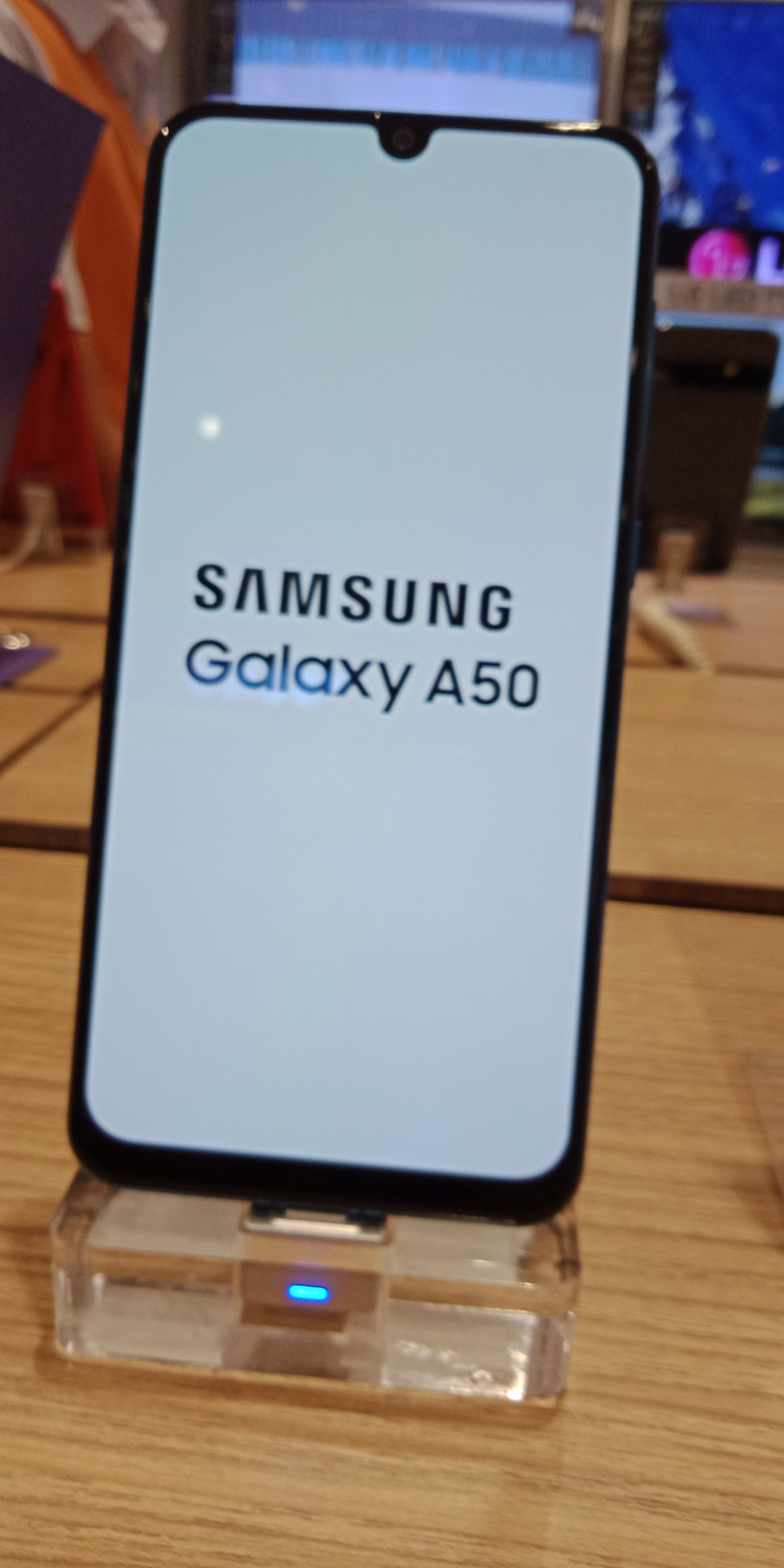

=== Design ===
Both variants feature a plastic back, plastic frame, and glass front (Corning Gorilla Glass 3).

Galaxy A50	Galaxy A50s
Black; White; Blue; Coral	Prism Crush Black; Prism Crush White; Prism Crush Violet; Prism Crush Green

=== Hardware ===
==== Display ====
Both variants have a 6.4" FHD+ (2340 x 1080) 60 Hz Super AMOLED Infinity-U display, with an 19.5:9 aspect ratio.

==== Battery ====
Both variants also have 4000mAh non-removable battery, with support for 15W Fast Charging.

==== Processor and memory ====
The regular variant is powered by the Samsung Exynos 9610, while the "s" variant is powered by Samsung Exynos 9611. It is sold in 4GB or 6GB of RAM and 64GB or 128GB of internal storage (which both use UFS 2.1) configurations, both of which can be expanded via a microSD card up to 512GB.

==== Camera ====
The regular variant comes with a triple rear camera array consisting of a 25MP (f/1.7) wide camera, an 8MP f2.2 ultra-wide camera, and a 5MP f2.2 depth sensor camera; it also comes with a 25MP front-facing camera. The "s" variant also features a triple rear camera setup, with an upgraded 48 MP wide rear camera and a 32 MP front camera; the ultrawide and depth cameras were unchanged.

Despite the chipset used in the A50 supporting 4K recording, its default camera app limits the maximum video recording resolution to just 1080p. The A50s, on the other hand, supports 4K recording for its primary rear camera and front camera.

=== Software ===
Both devices have Android 9.0 (Pie) pre-installed. The only difference is the One UI version pre-installed: One UI 1.1 for the A50, and One UI 1.5 for the A50s. Both devices were eligible for 2 OS upgrades and 4 years of security updates.

	Pre-installed OS	OS Upgrades history		End of support
	Pre-installed OS	1st	2nd	End of support
A50	Android 9 Pie (One UI 1.1)	Android 10 (One UI 2.0); March 2020 (One UI 2.5); December 2020	Android 11 (One UI 3.0); March 2021	April 2023
A50s	Android 9 Pie (One UI 1.5)	Android 10 (One UI 2.0); February 2020 (One UI 2.5); November 2020	Android 11 (One UI 3.1); March 2021	November 2023

== Reception ==
The A50 received mostly positive reviews. PCWorld gave it 4/5 stars, praising the display, design and battery life while criticizing the in-screen fingerprint sensor and the camera processing. Tom's Guide also gave it 4/5 stars, calling it "a budget phone with a big and colorful screen, solid performance and a sleek design" albeit with an "underwhelming battery life". CNET gave it an 8.4/10, describing it as "one of the best budget phones", and Digital Trends called it "the budget Samsung phone of your dreams".

The A50 was Samsung's best-selling smartphone in 2019, the best-selling smartphone in Europe in 2019, and the third best-selling phone in the world for the third quarter of 2019.
