= Samsung Galaxy S20 =

2020 flagship smartphones by Samsung Electronics

Samsung Galaxy S20 series

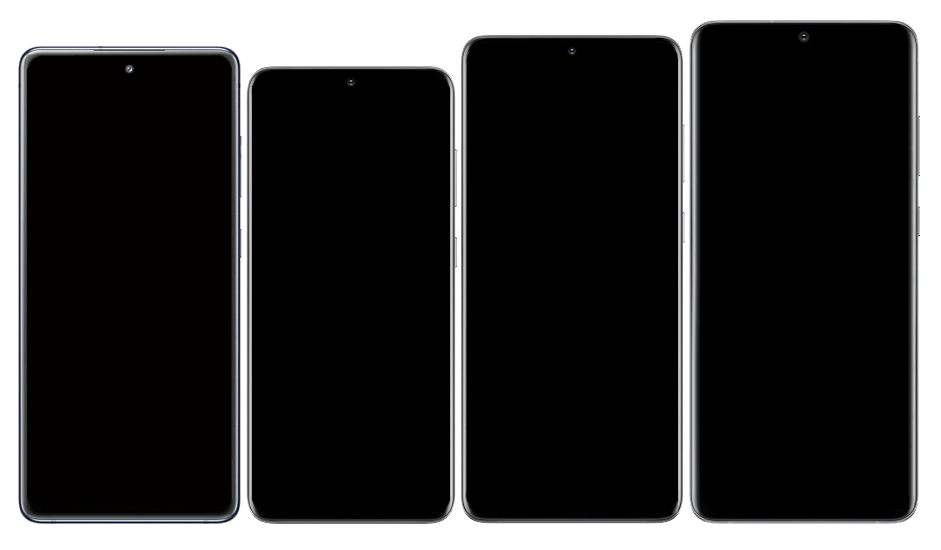
- From left to right: S20 FE, S20, S20+, and S20 Ultra
- Brand: Samsung
- Manufacturer: Samsung Electronics
- Type: Smartphone
- Series: Galaxy S
- First released: S20, S20+ and S20 Ultra: February 11, 2020; 6 years ago S20 FE: September 23, 2020; 6 years ago
- Availability by region: S20, S20+ and S20 Ultra: March 6, 2020 – January 29, 2021 (10 months, 3 weeks and 2 days); S20 FE: October 2, 2020 – January 7, 2022 (1 year, 3 months and 5 days)
- Discontinued: S20, S20+ and S20 Ultra: January 14, 2021; 5 years ago S20 FE: January 3, 2022; 4 years ago
- Predecessor: Samsung Galaxy S10; Samsung Galaxy Note FE (direct for S20 FE); Samsung Galaxy Note 10 Lite (indirect for S20 FE)
- Successor: Samsung Galaxy S21
- Related: Samsung Galaxy Z Flip; Samsung Galaxy Note 20; Samsung Galaxy Z Fold 2
- Compatible networks: 2G, 3G, 4G LTE, 5G
- Form factor: Slate
- Dimensions: S20: 151.7 mm × 69.1 mm × 7.9 mm (5.97 in × 2.72 in × 0.31 in); S20+: 161.9 mm × 73.7 mm × 7.8 mm (6.37 in × 2.90 in × 0.31 in); S20 Ultra: 166.9 mm × 76 mm × 8.8 mm (6.57 in × 2.99 in × 0.35 in); S20 FE: 159.8 mm × 74.5 mm × 8.4 mm (6.29 in × 2.93 in × 0.33 in)
- Weight: S20: 163 g (5.7 oz); S20+: 186–188 g (6.6–6.6 oz); S20 Ultra: 220–222 g (7.8–7.8 oz); S20 FE: 190 g (6.7 oz)
- Operating system: Original: S20, S20+, S20 Ultra: Android 10 with One UI 2.1; S20 FE: Android 10 with One UI 2.5; S20 FE 2022 remaster: Android 12 with One UI 4.1; Current: Android 13 with One UI 5.1
- System-on-chip: Europe, UAE, India, Indonesia, Brazil, and S20 FE 4G (except SM-G780G model): Samsung Exynos 990; Asia (except India, Indonesia and UAE), America (except Brazil), S20 FE 4G (SM-G780G) and 5G: Qualcomm Snapdragon 865
- CPU: Exynos: Octa-core (2x2.73 GHz Mongoose M5, 2x2.50 GHz Cortex-A76 and 4x2.0 GHz Cortex-A55); Snapdragon: Octa-core (1x2.84 GHz, 3x2.42 GHz and 4x1.8 GHz) Kryo 585
- GPU: Exynos: Mali-G77 MP11; Snapdragon: Adreno 650
- Memory: S20 & S20+: 8/12 GB LPDDR5; S20 Ultra: 12/16 GB LPDDR5; S20 FE: 6/8 GB LPDDR5; S20 FE 2022: 6 GB LPDDR5
- Storage: S20: 128 GB UFS 3.0; S20+ & S20 Ultra: 128/256/512 GB UFS 3.0; S20 FE: 128/256 GB UFS 3.1; S20 FE 2022: 128 GB UFS 3.1
- Removable storage: microSD, up to 1 TB; S20 5G UW: non-expandable
- SIM: S20, S20+ and S20 Ultra: NanoSIM (single SIM or hybrid dual SIM in dual stand-by), eSIM; S20 FE: NanoSIM (single SIM or hybrid dual SIM in dual stand-by)
- Battery: S20: 4000 mAh; S20+: 4500 mAh; S20 Ultra: 5000 mAh; S20 FE: 4500 mAh
- Charging: USB PD: S20, S20+, and S20 FE: 25W (PPS), 15W (non-PPS); S20 Ultra: 45W (PPS), 15W (non-PPS)
- Rear camera: S20: 12 MP, f/1.8, 26mm (wide), 1/1.76", Dual Pixel PDAF, OIS + 64 MP, f/2.0, 78 mm (telephoto), PDAF, OIS, 3x hybrid optical zoom + 12 MP, f/2.2, 13 mm (ultrawide), AF, Super Steady Video; S20+: In addition to above: 0.3 MP ToF 3D (depth); S20 Ultra: 108 MP, f/1.8, 26 mm (wide), 1/1.33", PDAF, OIS + 48 MP, f/3.5, 103 mm, 1/2", 0.8µm (periscope telephoto), PDAF, OIS, 4x optical zoom + 12 MP, f/2.2, 13 mm, 1.4µm (ultrawide), AF, Super Steady Video + 0.3 MP ToF 3D (depth); S20 FE: 12 MP, f/1.8, 26mm (wide), 1/1.76", Dual Pixel PDAF, OIS + 8 MP, f/2.4, 76 mm (telephoto), PDAF, OIS, 3x hybrid optical zoom + 12 MP, f/2.2, 15 mm (ultrawide), AF, Super Steady Video; S20, S20+, and S20 Ultra: LED flash, auto-HDR, panorama, 8K@24fps, 4K@30/60fps, 1080p@30/60/240fps, HDR10+, dual-video & stereo sound recording, gyro-EIS; S20 FE:LED flash, auto-HDR, panorama, 4K@30/60fps, 1080p@30/60/240fps, HDR10+, dual-video & stereo sound recording, gyro-EIS
- Front camera: S20 and S20+: 10 MP, f/2.2, 26 mm, 1/3.2", 1.22µm, Dual Pixel PDAF; S20 Ultra: 40 MP, f/2.2, 26 mm (wide), 1/2.65", 0.7µm, PDAF; S20 FE: 32 MP, f/2.0, 26 mm (wide), 1/2.74", 0.8µm, PDAF; All: Dual video call, Auto-HDR, 4K@30/60fps, 1080p@30fps
- Display: S20, S20+, and S20 Ultra: 3200×1440 1440p Dynamic AMOLED 2X Infinity-O capacitive touchscreen, Gorilla Glass 6, HDR10+, 120 Hz refresh rate S20 FE: 2400×1080 1080p Super AMOLED Infinity-O capacitive touchscreen, Gorilla Glass 3, HDR10+, 120 Hz refresh rate; S20: 6.2 in (157 mm), 563 ppi; S20+: 6.7 in (170 mm), 525 ppi; S20 Ultra: 6.9 in (175 mm), 511 ppi; S20 FE: 6.5 in (165 mm), 407 ppi; (all Diamond PenTile)
- Sound: Dolby Atmos stereo speakers tuned by AKG
- Connectivity: Bluetooth 5.0; Wi-Fi a/b/g/n/ac/ax 3G/LTE/5G
- Data inputs: Sensors: Accelerometer; Barometer; Fingerprint scanner (ultrasonic); Pressure sensor; Magnetometer; Gyroscope; Hall sensor; Proximity sensor; RGB light sensor; Other: Physical sound volume keys; USB-C
- Water resistance: IP68, up to 1.5 m (4.9 ft) for 30 minutes
- Website: "Samsung Galaxy S20, S20+ & S20 Ultra 5G Features | Samsung US". Samsung Electronics America.

The Samsung Galaxy S20 is a series of high-end Android-based smartphones developed, manufactured, and marketed by Samsung Electronics as part of its flagship Galaxy S series. They collectively serve as the successor to the Galaxy S10 series. The first three smartphones (Galaxy S20, Galaxy S20+, and the Galaxy S20 Ultra) were unveiled at Samsung's Galaxy Unpacked event on February 11, 2020, alongside Galaxy Z Flip, and they were released in the United States on March 6, 2020 and in Europe on March 13, 2020. Two additional versions of the Galaxy S20 smartphone were released: the Galaxy S20 5G UW was announced on June 4, 2020 and released on AT&T in the United States on the same day, and the Galaxy S20 FE was announced on September 23, 2020 and released on October 2, 2020. In May 2020, a rugged variant for military use named the "Tactical Edition" was released.

It is the first Galaxy smartphone lineup with all models having a 120 Hz high refresh rate display, (Note: Users can choose to run the device at either 60 Hz or 120 Hz with 60 Hz mode being the default option, however 120 Hz mode only supports FHD+ resolution.) an upgrade from the previous 60 Hz. Its telephoto camera zoom is also improved past 10x, with the S20 and S20+ having 30x, (Note: The camera's optical zoom factor is actually 1.06x, and uses cropping and processing algorithms to achieve the claimed 3x factor, and it's 64MP telephoto camera is digitally zoomed in to achieve 30X zoom.) and the S20 Ultra gaining 100x zoom alongside a 108MP main sensor. All models received USB fast-charger certification from the USB Implementers Forum (USB-IF). The Galaxy S20 models (except the S20 5G UW) are the last in the Galaxy S series to include a microSD card slot which was revived with the Galaxy S7 series back in 2016.

The Galaxy S20 was succeeded by the Galaxy S21, which was announced on January 14, 2021. In April 2022, following the release of its new flagship, the Galaxy S22, Samsung released a refreshed version of the Galaxy S20 FE known as the Galaxy S20 FE 2022, which has the same processor as the Galaxy S20 series. It has 6 GB of RAM and 128 GB of internal storage and ships with One UI 4 based on Android 12.

== History ==
The title of the phone was originally presumed to be the Galaxy S11, due to it being the logical extension from its predecessor, the Galaxy S10. However, successive leaks in January 2020 revealed the title of the phone to be named the Galaxy S20, because it was released in the year 2020.

Leaker Max Weinbach obtained the actual phone a month before the release, confirming the leaks, and that by February, "almost everything the company is planning to introduce has already leaked out." In addition to charts on the phone's specifications, marketing material and images of the phones themselves in real life were leaked.

== Design ==
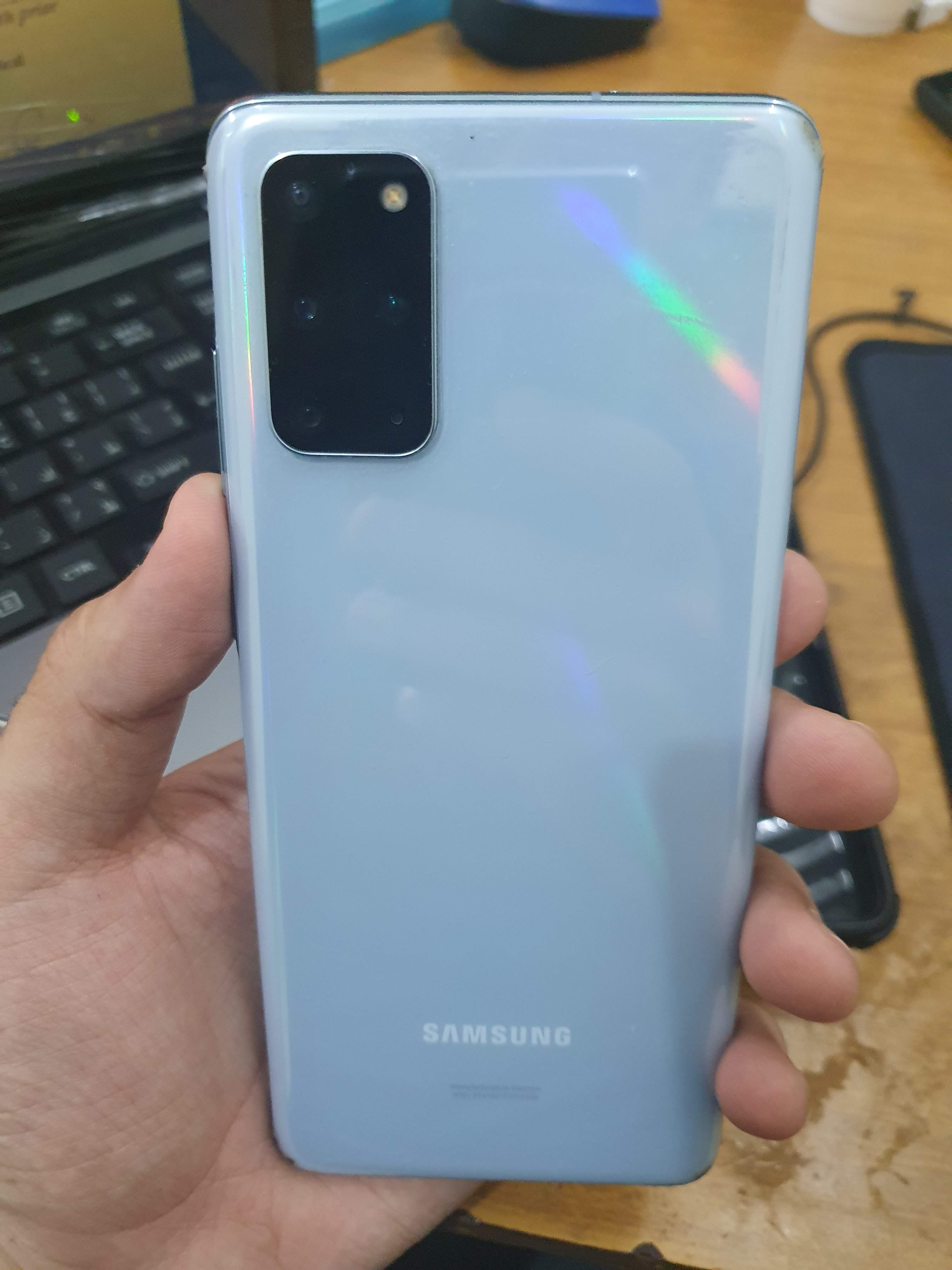
Back of an S20 Plus

The Galaxy S20 series has a design similar to the Samsung Galaxy Note 10, with an Infinity-O display containing a circular punch-hole in the top center this time for the frontal selfie camera.

In a departure from past Galaxy S designs (except the S10 Lite where it has the camera at the left), the rear camera array is not centered, but located in the corner with a rectangular protrusion similar to that of the iPhone 11, Google Pixel 4 and past Samsung flagships such as the Note 10, Galaxy S and the original Samsung Galaxy. The S20 and S20 FE house three cameras, while the S20+ has four cameras in the bump, while the S20 Ultra houses four cameras in a larger bump.

	Galaxy S20 FE	Galaxy S20 and S20+	Galaxy S20 Ultra
Base colors	Cloud Navy; Cloud Lavender; Cloud Mint; Cloud Red; Cloud Orange; Cloud White	Cosmic Gray; Cosmic Black; Cloud Pink; Cloud Blue; Aura Red; Aura Blue (Galaxy S20+ only)	Cloud White; Cosmic Gray; Cosmic Black

In June 2020, Verizon released the Galaxy S20 5G UW (Ultra Wideband). Differences from the S20 include the addition of mmWave, only 8 GB of RAM (compared to the usual 12 GB), and no microSD slot. Moreover, Samsung released the Galaxy S20+ 5G BTS Edition in the summer of 2020, with the color "Haze Purple."

== Specifications ==
=== Hardware ===
==== Chipsets ====
The S20 line comprises three models with various hardware specifications; international models of the S20 utilize the Exynos 990 system-on-chip, while the U.S., Canadian, Korean, Chinese and Japanese models utilize the Qualcomm Snapdragon 865.

==== Display ====
The first three Galaxy S20 models feature a 1440p Dynamic AMOLED 2X display with HDR10+ support and "dynamic tone mapping" technology. The S20 FE also features the same HDR10+ support and "dynamic tone mapping" technology, but has a lower 1080p resolution and superAMOLED display.

The S20, S20 FE, and S20+ have a 6.2-inch, 6.5-inch, and 6.7-inch display, respectively, while the S20 Ultra has a 6.9-inch display. Except for the S20 FE, displays have curved sides that slope over the horizontal edges of the device. All devices utilize 20:9 aspect ratio in addition to a 120 Hz refresh rate, double that of the S10. (Note: Users can choose to run the device at either 60 Hz or 120 Hz with 60 Hz mode being the default option, however 120 Hz mode only supports FHD+ resolution.) The S20, S20+, and S20 Ultra utilize an ultrasonic in-screen fingerprint sensor while the S20 FE utilises a more traditional optical in-screen fingerprint sensor.

Spec	Galaxy S20 FE	Galaxy S20	Galaxy S20+	Galaxy S20 Ultra
Display size	6.5 in (165 mm)	6.2 in (157 mm)	6.7 in (170 mm)	6.8 in (173 mm)
Resolution	2400×1080	3200×1440		
Density	~407 ppi	~563 ppi	~525 ppi	~511 ppi
Aspect ratio	20:9			
Refresh rate	60 Hz / 120 Hz (Note: Users can choose to run the device at either 60 Hz or 120 Hz with 60 Hz mode being the default option, however 120 Hz mode only supports FHD+ resolution.)			
Panel	superAMOLED, HDR10+	Dynamic AMOLED 2X, HDR10+		
Cover glass	Gorilla Glass 3	Gorilla Glass 6		
Ref.				

==== Cameras ====
The cameras on the Galaxy S20 series improved considerably over its predecessors, although unlike the S9 and S10, the aperture on the main lens is fixed. While the megapixels of the main and ultra wide sensors remained unchanged on the S20 and S20+, the telephoto sensor received some improvements. The 64-megapixel telephoto camera, branded as “Space Zoom”, supports 3X hybrid optical zoom (Note: The camera's optical zoom factor is actually 1.06x, and uses cropping and processing algorithms to achieve the claimed 3x factor.) (branded as "Hybrid Optic Zoom") and 30X digital zoom at 64 megapixels on the new telephoto sensor instead of 12 megapixels at two times on the S10 and 30 times digitally (branded as "Super-Resolution Zoom").

The S20+ has a time-of-flight sensor (branded as "DepthVision Camera") in addition to the regular S20's cameras. The Galaxy S20 Ultra has a quadruple lens setup that supports 4X optical zoom and 100X digital zoom, with a 108-megapixel wide image sensor, a 12-megapixel ultra-wide sensor and a 48-megapixel periscope telephoto sensor accompanied by a time-of-flight sensor. Both the wide-angle and telephoto sensors use pixel binning to output higher quality images at a standard resolution, with the wide-angle sensor using Nonacell technology which groups 3x3 pixels to capture more light.

The front camera is able to record video footage at 2160p.

A new camera mode was introduced called Single Take, which allows users to capture photos or videos at the same time with different sensors automatically.

Models	Galaxy S20 FE	Galaxy S20	Galaxy S20+	Galaxy S20 Ultra
Wide	12 MP (f/1.8)			108 MP (f/1.8)
Ultrawide	12 MP (f/2.2)			
Telephoto	8 MP (3×) (f/2.4)	64 MP (1.1×) (f/2.0)		48 MP (4×) (f/3.5)
ToF	n/a		(640 x 480) 307.2 KP	
Front	32 MP (f/2.2)	10 MP (f/2.2)		40 MP (f/2.2)
Galaxy S20/S20+/S20 Ultra support 8K video recording at up to 24fps Galaxy S20 FE support 4K video recording at up to 60fps

==== Storage ====
The base amount of RAM is 6 GB with an additional 8 GB option for the S20 FE, while the base amount is 8 GB, with an additional 12 GB option for the S20 & S20+ and a 16 GB option for the S20 Ultra. 128 GB of internal storage is standard with the S20 FE offering a 256 GB option while the S20+ & S20 Ultra also offers 256 GB and 512 GB options, with up to 1 TB of expansion via the microSD card slot. Verizon's Galaxy S20 5G UW model is not equipped with a microSD slot.

Model	Memory	Storage options	Storage type
Galaxy S20 FE	6 GB / 8 GB	128 GB / 256 GB	UFS 3.1
Galaxy S20	8 GB / 12 GB	128 GB	UFS 3.0
Galaxy S20+	8 GB / 12 GB	128 GB / 256 GB / 512 GB	UFS 3.0
Galaxy S20 Ultra	12 GB / 16 GB	128 GB / 256 GB / 512 GB	UFS 3.0
Ref.			

==== Batteries ====
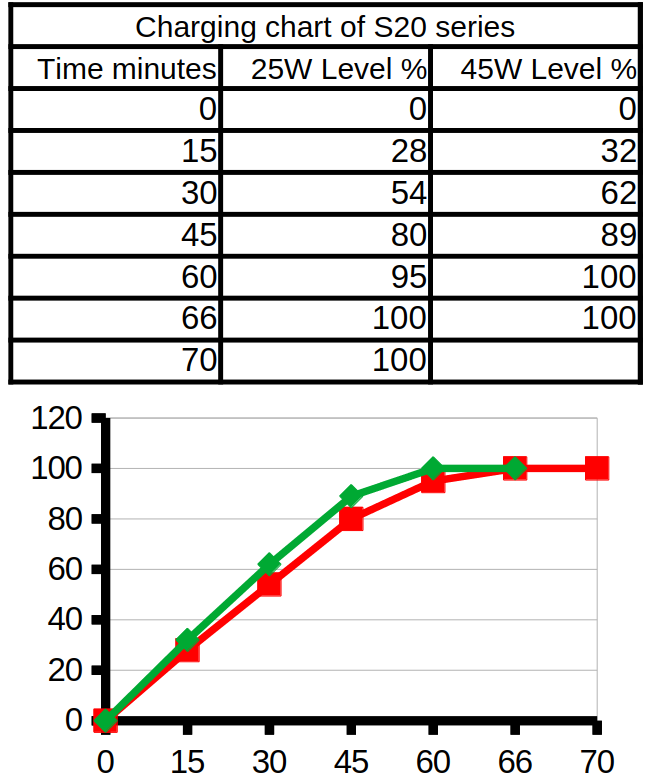
Charging chart

The S20, S20 FE, S20+, & S20 Ultra contain non-removable 4000 mAh, 4500 mAh, 4500 mAh, and 5000 mAh Li-Po batteries respectively, and Qi inductive charging is supported at up to 15 W as well as the ability to charge other Qi-compatible devices from the S20's own battery power, which is branded as “Samsung PowerShare”. Wired charging is supported over USB-C at up to 25 W for the S20, S20 FE, & S20+ and 45 W for the S20 Ultra. They support reverse charging at 4.5 W.

	Galaxy S20 FE	Galaxy S20	Galaxy S20+	Galaxy S20 Ultra
Battery capacity	4,500 mAh	4,000 mAh	4,500 mAh	5,000 mAh
Wired charging speed	25 W			45 W
Qi wireless charging speed	15 W			
Reverse wireless charging speed	4.5 W			
Ref.				

==== Connectivity ====
The S20 series comes with 5G standard connectivity, though some regions may have special LTE variants. However, only Verizon models are compatible with higher-speed millimeter-wave networks. For the first time in the Galaxy S series, the 3.5 mm audio jack has been omitted entirely.

Model	Wi-Fi	Bluetooth	USB	NFC
Galaxy S20 FE	Wi-Fi 6	5.0	USB-C 3.2 (5Gbps)	Yes
Galaxy S20	Wi-Fi 6	5.0	USB-C 3.2 (5Gbps)	Yes
Galaxy S20+	Wi-Fi 6	5.0	USB-C 3.2 (5Gbps)	Yes
Galaxy S20 Ultra	Wi-Fi 6	5.0	USB-C 3.2 (5Gbps)	Yes
Ref.				

=== Software ===
All four phones initially ran on Android 10 and Samsung's custom skin One UI 2.1. On 18 August 2020, it was announced that all variants of the S20 series would be eligible for 3 OS upgrades and 4 years of security updates. Initially, security updates were due to end in 2024, but was quietly extended by 1 year (until 2025).

S20 phones sold in Europe had news aggregator upday in partnership with Axel Springer SE preinstalled, triggering notifications.

	Pre-installed OS	OS Upgrades history			End of support
	Pre-installed OS	1st	2nd	3rd	End of support
S20; S20+ S20 Ultra	Android 10 (One UI 2.1) Minor One UI update: (One UI 2.5); August 2020	Android 11 (One UI 3.0); December 2020 (One UI 3.1); February 2021	Android 12 (One UI 4.0); December 2021 (One UI 4.1); March 2022	Android 13 (One UI 5.0); November 2022 (One UI 5.1); February 2023	April 2025
S20 FE	Android 10 (One UI 2.5)	Android 11 (One UI 3.0); December 2020 (One UI 3.1); February 2021	Android 12 (One UI 4.0); December 2021 (One UI 4.1); March 2022	Android 13 (One UI 5.0); November 2022 (One UI 5.1); February 2023	October 2025

=== Known issues ===
Even before the general release, reviewers have seen autofocus and skin smoothing issues with the cameras, especially with the Galaxy S20 Ultra. Samsung is working on a fix, but the Exynos model continues to have autofocus issues after an update that was supposed to fix them.

Galaxy S20 Ultra can only record at 720p480fps and it interpolates with AI to 720p960fps, Galaxy S20 and S20+ can record at 720p960fps.

Users have reported that the Snapdragon version has GPS lock issues. The Exynos model is also known to have heating issues. Some devices also suffer from green display tint issues after a software update. The camera glass has been reported of spontaneously cracking, particularly on the Ultra version.

Some users reported instances of the Galaxy S20 FE suffering from touchscreen issues such as "ghost" touches and jittery movement when scrolling or zooming. Samsung attempted to fix the issue with several updates.

Some users in India reported that after being updated to One UI 4.0, a vertical line started appearing on the front display. These devices were out of warranty and Samsung India concluded it was user error. They charged around 16,000 INR to those users who were looking for a screen replacement. Around a thousand affected users tweeted about it asking for help and others decided to take legal action. Samsung India has still failed to acknowledge this issue.

== Samsung Galaxy S20 Tactical Edition ==
Samsung Galaxy S20 Tactical Edition
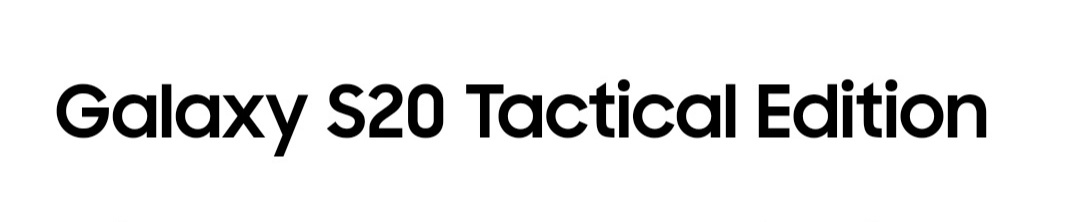

- Manufacturer: Samsung Electronics
- Type: Smartphone
- First released: 20 May 2020; 6 years ago
- Successor: Galaxy S23 Tactical Edition
- Compatible networks: 5G
- Operating system: Current: Android 13
- System-on-chip: Samsung Exynos 990
- CPU: 2GHz Octa-core
- Memory: 12GB RAM
- Storage: 128GB
- Removable storage: microSD
- Battery: Non-removable 4000 mAh
- Charging: Super Fast charging up to 20W; Qi wireless charging
- Rear camera: 12MP + 64MP
- Front camera: 10MP
- Display: 6.2 in (160 mm) (1440×3200 px)
- Data inputs: Touch Screen
- Codename: Galaxphones
- Website: Official website

The Samsung Galaxy S20 Tactical Edition (TE) is a touchscreen-enabled, slate-format Android smartphone designed, developed, and marketed by Samsung Electronics.

The device is built matching the needs of operators in the U.S. federal government and U.S. Department of Defense. The mobile is Commercial Solutions for Classified Program (CSfC) component approved, with support to night vision, stealth mode, drone feeds and laser range finders. It can connect to tactical radios and mission systems, and runs applications like Battlefield assisted trauma distributed observation kit (BATDOK) etc.

== Reception ==
IGN praised the Galaxy S20 Ultra in its review for its build quality, performance, 120 Hz screen, battery life, and charging speed, but criticized the image quality of the 100x zoom feature and high price. The Verge's review similarly praised the phone's design, performance, and 120 Hz screen, also positively highlighting the 5G network support, but finding its starting price "very expensive".

== Gallery ==
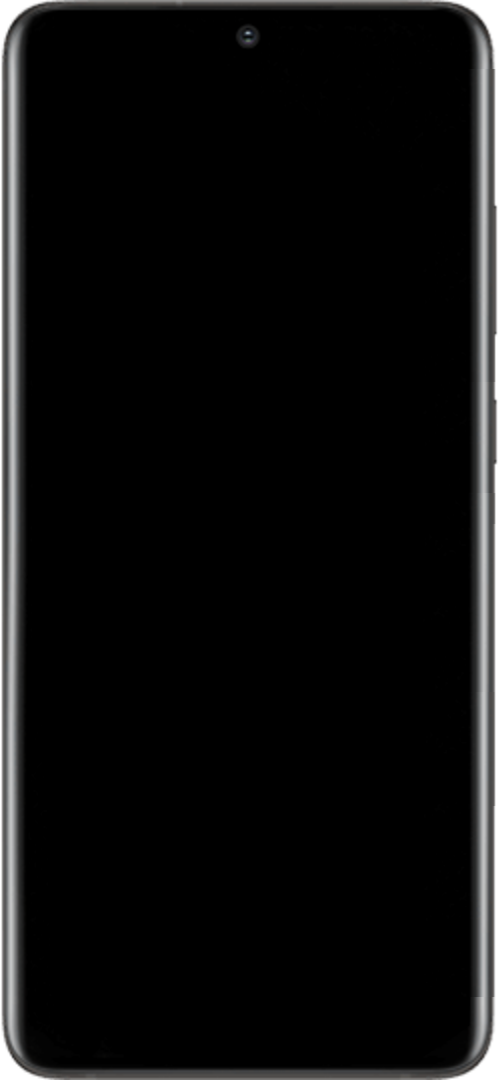
Galaxy S20 Ultra

Galaxy S20 FE logo

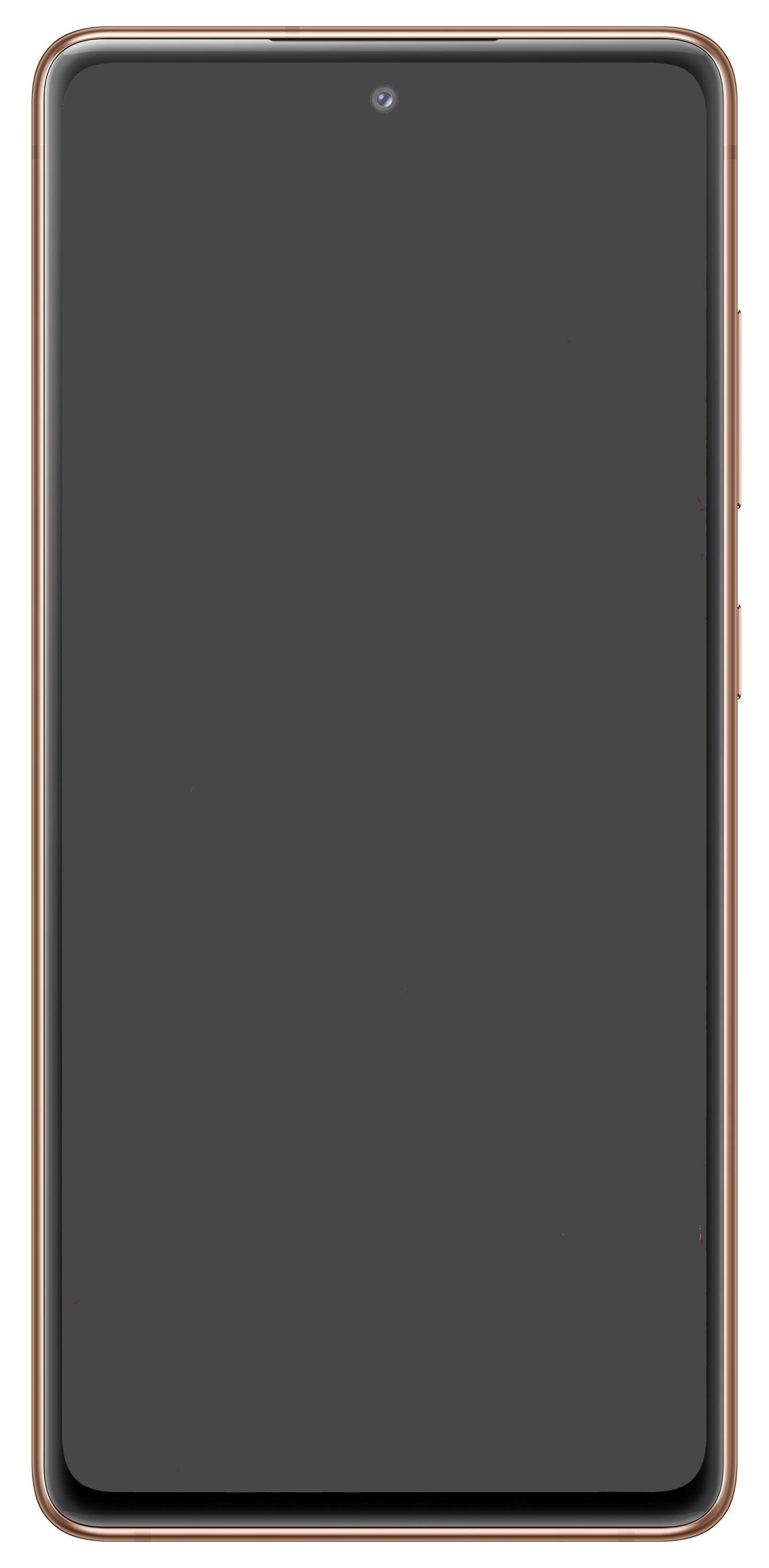
Galaxy S20 FE

== See also ==
- Digital zoom § iZoom
- Samsung Galaxy
- Samsung Galaxy S series
- Exynos
- List of Qualcomm Snapdragon processors
- AMOLED

Preceded by Samsung Galaxy S10	Samsung Galaxy S20; 2020	Succeeded by Samsung Galaxy S21
