= Samsung Galaxy A70 =

2019 mid-range Android smartphone from Samsung

Samsung Galaxy A70 Samsung Galaxy A70s

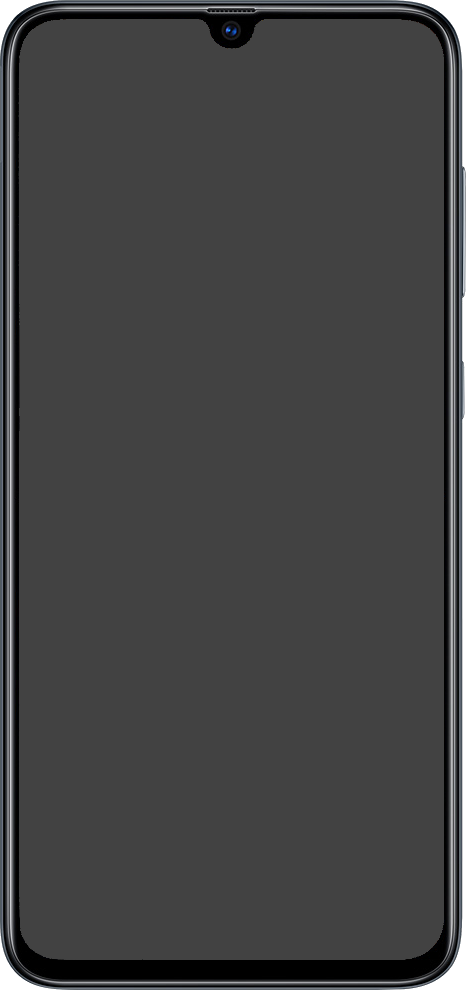
- Brand: Samsung
- Manufacturer: Samsung Electronics
- Type: Phablet
- First released: March 2019; 7 years ago
- Availability by region: March 26, 2019
- Predecessor: Samsung Galaxy A8+ / A8 Star
- Successor: Samsung Galaxy A70s; Samsung Galaxy A71
- Related: Samsung Galaxy A10; Samsung Galaxy A20; Samsung Galaxy A30; Samsung Galaxy A50
- Compatible networks: 2G, 3G, 4G, LTE, VoLTE, Wi-Fi, VoWi-Fi, Bluetooth, NFC for Samsung Pay
- Form factor: Slate
- Dimensions: 164.3 mm (6.47 in) H 76.7 mm (3.02 in) W 6.9 mm (0.27 in) D
- Weight: 183 g (6.5 oz)
- Operating system: Original: Android 9.0 "Pie" with One UI 1.1; Last: Android 11 with One UI 3.1
- System-on-chip: Snapdragon 675
- CPU: Octa core 2.0 GHz Kryo 460 Gold and 1.7 GHz Kryo 460 Silver
- GPU: Adreno 612 GPU
- Memory: 6 GB / 8 GB
- Storage: A70: 64/128 GB; A70s: 128 GB
- Removable storage: microSDXC, Expandable up to 512 GB
- SIM: nano-SIM; Dual nano-SIM
- Battery: 4500 mAh lithium-polymer
- Charging: 25 W Super Fast Charging
- Rear camera: A70: Primary: 32 MP, f/1.7, 26mm, 1/2.8", 0.8µm, PDAF; Ultrawide: 8 MP, f/2.2, 12mm, 1/4.0", 1.12µm; Depth: 5 MP, f/2.2; A70s: Primary: 64 MP, f/1.8, 26mm, 1/1.72", 0.8µm, PDAF; Ultrawide: 8 MP, f/2.2, 12mm, 1/4.0", 1.12µm; Depth: 5 MP, f/2.2; All: LED flash, Panorama, HDR; 4K@30fps, 1080p@30/240fps
- Front camera: 32 MP, f/2.0, 25mm (wide), 1/2.8", 0.8µm; HDR; 1080p@30fps
- Display: 6.7 in (170 mm); 1080 x 2400 px resolution, 20:9 ratio (~393 ppi density); Super AMOLED; Corning Gorilla Glass 3
- Data inputs: Multi-touch screen; USB Type-C 2.0, OTG; Fingerprint scanner (under display, optical); Accelerometer; Gyroscope; Proximity sensor; Compass
- Model: SM-A705x (Galaxy A70); SM-A707x (Galaxy A70s) (Last letter varies by carrier and international models)

The Samsung Galaxy A70 is a mid-range Android-based smartphone manufactured by Samsung Electronics as part of its fifth-generation Galaxy A series line-up. The phones feature Android 9 (Pie) with Samsung's proprietary One UI skin, 128 GB of internal storage, and a 4500 mAh battery. It was announced on March 26, 2019. An "s" variant was also announced on September 27, 2019, which upgraded its main primary camera to 64 MP, a first for the Galaxy A series.

== Specifications ==
=== Design ===
Both the A70 and A70s feature a plastic frame, plastic back, and a glass front.

| Galaxy A70 | Galaxy A70s |
|---|---|
| Black; White; Blue; Coral | Prism Crush Black; Prism Crush White; Prism Crush Red |

=== Hardware ===
==== Display ====
Both devices feature a 6.7-inch FHD+ (1080×2400) Super AMOLED display with a U-shaped notch for the front camera, similar to the Galaxy A50.

==== Battery ====
Both devices feature a 4500mAh battery and supports 25W Fast Charging, a first for the overall Galaxy A series.

==== Processor and memory ====
Both devices also feature the Qualcomm Snapdragon 675 octa-core SoC, with 6 GB or 8 GB of RAM, and sold only in a sole 128 GB of internal storage that is expandable to 1 TB via microSD card.

==== Camera ====
The phone has a triple camera setup consisting of a 32 MP f/1.7 (64 MP f/1.8 for the A70s) wide-angle lens, 8 MP f/2.2 ultra-wide angle lens, and a 5 MP depth sensor. It has a 32 MP f/2.0 selfie camera. The phone also can record 4K and super-slow motion video through the camera application.

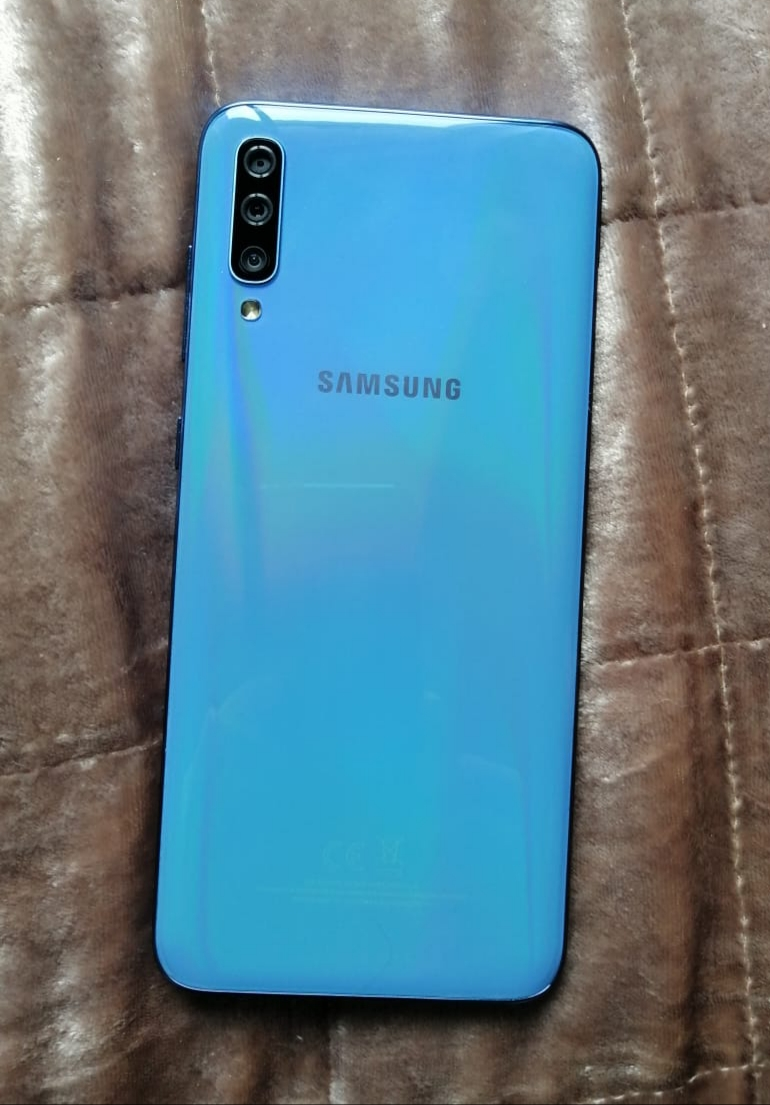
Samsung Galaxy A70 (blue model) viewed from the back, showcasing the triple cameras

=== Software ===
The devices run on Android Pie with One UI 1.0 skin. It was eligible for 2 OS upgrades and 3 years of security updates.

| | Pre-installed OS | OS Upgrades history | | End of support |
| | Pre-installed OS | 1st | 2nd | End of support |
|---|---|---|---|---|
| A70 | Android 9 Pie (One UI 1.0) | Android 10 (One UI 2.0); March 2020 (One UI 2.5); November 2020 | Android 11 (One UI 3.1); March 2021 | November 2023 |
| A70s | Android 9 Pie (One UI 1.0) | Android 10 (One UI 2.0); March 2020 (One UI 2.5); November 2020 | Android 11 (One UI 3.1); March 2021 | November 2023 |

== Reception ==
The Galaxy A70 was met with positive reviews by critics. Nathan Spend low and Matt Breen of Expert Reviews gave a score of 5 out of 5, calling it Samsung's best mid-range phone and praising its triple camera array, 4500mah battery, and display, while critiquing the slower performance compared to the A50. John McCann of TechRadar also positively described the phone's Super AMOLED display and large battery. GSMArena.com gave the phone a rating of 3.8 out of 5, calling it a "very balanced mid-ranger", praising the phone's camera, battery and sAMOLED display, while critiquing the camera's low-light performance.
