= Samsung Galaxy S10 =

2019 flagship smartphones by Samsung Electronics

Samsung Galaxy S10 series

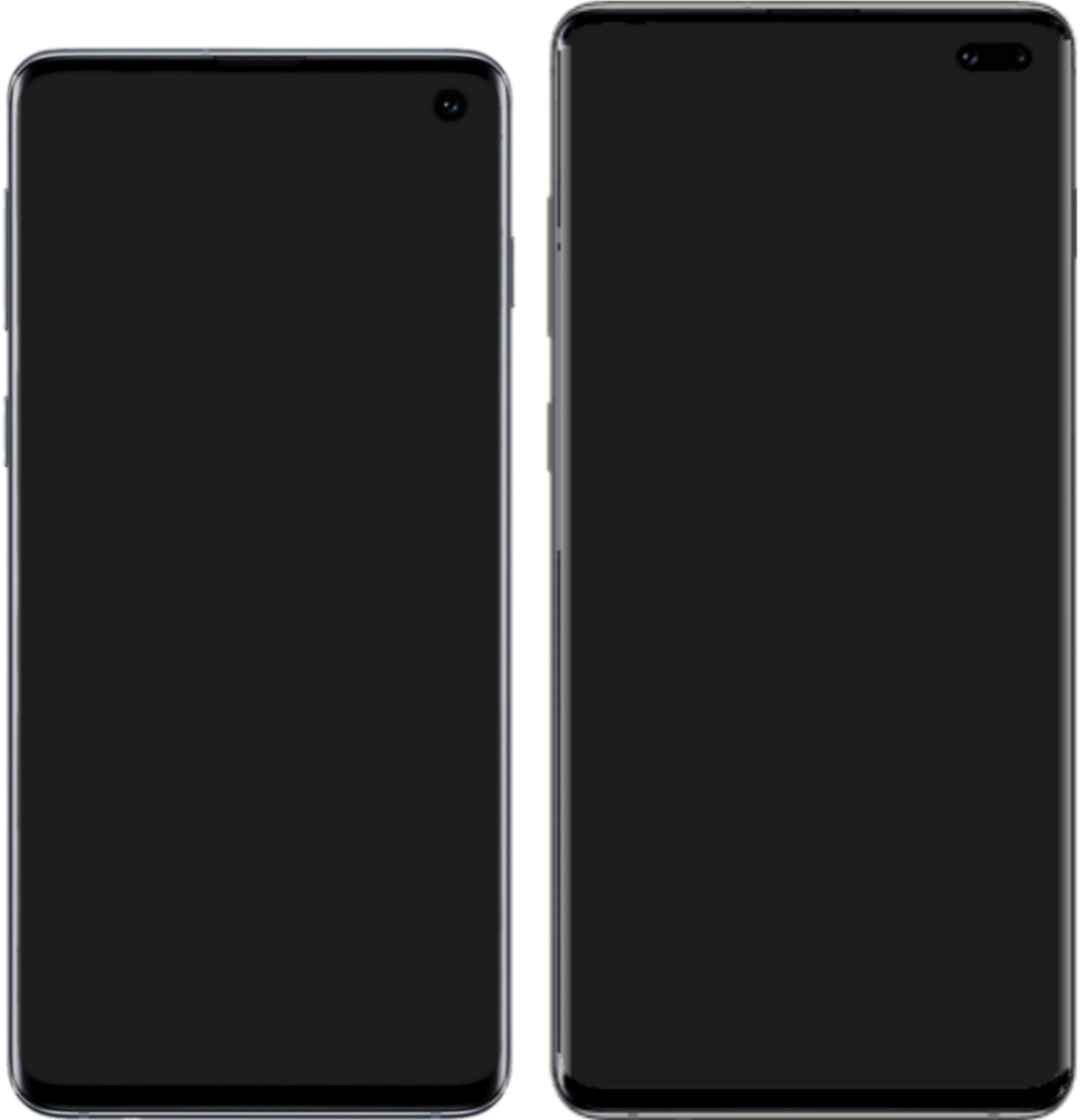
- Samsung Galaxy S10 and Samsung Galaxy S10+
- Brand: Samsung
- Manufacturer: Samsung Electronics
- Type: S10 and S10e: Smartphone; S10+, S10 5G and S10 Lite: Phablet
- Series: Galaxy S
- Family: Samsung Galaxy
- First released: S10, S10e, S10+ and S10 5G: 8 March 2019; 7 years ago S10 Lite: 20 January 2020; 6 years ago
- Availability by region: South Korea: 20 February 2019; United States & Australia: 6 March 2019; Global: 8 March 2019
- Discontinued: S10, S10e, S10+ and S10 5G: 6 March 2020; 6 years ago S10 Lite: 2 October 2020; 6 years ago
- Predecessor: Samsung Galaxy S9; Samsung Galaxy A90 5G (for S10 Lite); Samsung Galaxy S5 Neo (for S10e or S10 Lite)
- Successor: Samsung Galaxy S20; S20 (direct for S10 & S10e/indirect for S10 5G); S20+ (direct for S10+/indirect for S10 5G); S20 Ultra (direct for S10 5G); S20 FE (for S10e or S10 Lite)
- Related: Samsung Galaxy Note 10; Samsung Galaxy Fold
- Compatible networks: 2G / 3G / 4G / 4G LTE; S10 5G: 5G NR
- Form factor: Slate
- Dimensions: S10: 149.9 × 70.4 × 7.8 mm (5.90 × 2.77 × 0.31 in); S10e: 142.2 × 69.9 × 7.9 mm (5.60 × 2.75 × 0.31 in); S10+: 157.6 × 74.1 × 7.8 mm (6.20 × 2.92 × 0.31 in); S10 5G: 162.6 × 77.1 × 7.9 mm (6.40 × 3.04 × 0.31 in); S10 Lite: 162.5 × 75.6 × 8.1 mm (6.40 × 2.98 × 0.32 in)
- Weight: S10: 157 g (5.5 oz); S10e: 150 g (5.3 oz); S10+: 175 g (6.2 oz), 198 g (7.0 oz) with ceramic color S10 5G: 198 g (7.0 oz); S10 Lite: 186 g (6.6 oz)
- Operating system: S10, S10e, S10+ and S10 5G: Original: Android Pie with One UI 1.1; Current: Android 12 with One UI 4.1; S10 Lite: Original: Android 10 with One UI 2.0; Current: Android 13 with One UI 5.1
- System-on-chip: Worldwide (except S10 Lite): Samsung Exynos 9 Series 9820; U.S., Canada, Hong Kong, China, Japan, Latin America (except Brazil), and S10 Lite: Snapdragon 855
- CPU: Exynos: Octa-core (2 × 2.73 GHz Mongoose-M4, 2 × 2.31 GHz Cortex-A75 and 4 × 1.95 GHz Cortex-A55); Snapdragon: Octa-core (1 × 2.84 GHz, 3 × 2.42 GHz and 4 × 1.8 GHz Kryo 485)
- GPU: Exynos: Mali-G76 MP12; Snapdragon: Adreno 640
- Memory: LPDDR4X-4266 RAM; S10 and S10 5G: 8 GB; S10e: 6 or 8 GB; S10+: 8 or 12 GB; S10 Lite: 6 or 8 GB
- Storage: S10: UFS 128, 256, 512 or 1024 GB; S10e: UFS 128 or 256 GB; S10+: UFS 128, 256, 512 or 1TB; S10 5G: UFS 256, 512 or 1TB; S10 Lite: UFS 128 or 512 GB
- Removable storage: S10e, S10, S10+ and S10 Lite: microSD, up to 1 TB; S10 5G: none
- SIM: nanoSIM; Single SIM or Hybrid Dual SIM in dual stand-by
- Battery: S10: 3400 mAh; S10e: 3100 mAh; S10+: 4100 mAh; S10 5G: 4500 mAh; S10 Lite: 4500 mAh
- Charging: 10W+ Qi wireless charging USB PD: Qualcomm QC 2.0 Type C 15W (S10, S10e and S10+); 25W (PPS), 15W (non-PPS) (S10 5G and S10 Lite)
- Rear camera: S10e: 12 MP, f/1.5-2.4, 26 mm (wide), 1/2.55", 1.4 μm, Dual Pixel PDAF, OIS + 16 MP, f/2.2, 12 mm (ultrawide), 1/3.1", 1.0 μm, Super Steady video; S10 and S10+: 12 MP, f/2.4, 52 mm (telephoto), 1/3.6", 1.0 μm, AF, OIS, 2x optical zoom + 12 MP, f/1.5-2.4, 26 mm (wide), 1/2.55", 1.4 μm, Dual Pixel PDAF, OIS + 16 MP, f/2.2, 12 mm (ultrawide), 1/3.1", 1.0 μm, Super Steady video; S10 5G: 12 MP, f/2.4, 52 mm (telephoto), 1/3.6", 1.0 μm, AF, OIS, 2x optical zoom + 12 MP, f/1.8, 26 mm (wide), 1/1.76", 1.8 μm, Dual Pixel PDAF, OIS + 16 MP, f/2.2, 12 mm (ultrawide), 1/3.1", 1.0 μm, Super Steady video + 0.3 MP, ToF 3D (Depth Camera); S10 Lite: 48 MP, f/2.0, 26 mm (wide), 1/2.0", 0.8 μm, PDAF, Super Steady OIS + 12 MP, f/2.2, 12 mm (ultrawide) + 5 MP, f/2.4 (macro)
- Front camera: S10 and S10e: 10 MP, f/1.9, 26 mm (wide), 1/3", 1.22 μm, Dual Pixel PDAF; S10+: 10 MP, f/1.9, 26 mm (wide), 1/3", 1.22 μm, Dual Pixel PDAF + 8 MP, f/2.2, 22 mm (wide), 1/4", 1.12 μm, depth sensor S10 5G: 10 MP, f/1.9, 26 mm (wide), 1/3", 1.22 μm, Dual Pixel PDAF + ToF 3D Depth Camera; S10 Lite: 32 MP, f/2.2, 25 mm (wide), 1/2.8", 0.8 μm
- Display: All models except S10e and S10 Lite: 3040×1440 1440p Dynamic AMOLED capacitive touchscreen Gorilla Glass 6 HDR10+ Infinity-O display (Diamond PenTile); S10: 6.1 in (155.1 mm) (550 ppi) S10e: 2280×1080 1080p Dynamic AMOLED capacitive touchscreen Gorilla Glass 5 HDR10+ Infinity-O display; 5.8 in (146.1 mm) (438 ppi) S10+: 6.4 in (163.5 mm) (522 ppi) S10 5G: 6.7 in (169.2 mm) (505 ppi) S10 Lite: 2400×1080 1080p Super AMOLED Plus capacitive touchscreen Gorilla Glass 3+ HDR10+ Infinity-O display; 6.7 in (169.5 mm) (394 ppi)
- Sound: Dolby Atmos stereo speakers tuned by AKG (except S10 Lite)
- Connectivity: Bluetooth 5.0; Wi-Fi a/b/g/n/ac/ax USB-C; 3.5mm headphone jack (except S10 Lite)
- Data inputs: Accelerometer; Barometer; Capacitive touchscreen; Fingerprint scanner; Magnetometer; Gyroscope; Hall sensor; Pressure sensor; Proximity sensor; Satellite navigation (GPS / GLONASS / BeiDou / Galileo); Heart rate and blood pressure sensor (except S10e and S10 5G); RGB light sensor; Power button; Volume rocker; Bixby key; (except S10 Lite)
- Water resistance: S10, S10e, S10+ and S10 5G: IP68, up to 1.5 m (4.9 ft) for 30 minutes (except S10 Lite)
- Model: International models: SM-G973x (S10) SM-G970x (S10e) SM-G975x (S10+) SM-G977x (S10 5G) SM-G770x (S10 Lite) (Last letter varies by carrier and international models.); Japanese models: SCV41 (au, S10) SC-03L (NTT Docomo, S10) SM-G973C (Rakuten Mobile, S10) SCV42 (au, S10+) SC-04L (NTT Docomo, S10+) SC-05L (NTT Docomo, S10+ Olympic Games Edition)
- Codename: Beyond0 (S10e); Beyond1 (S10); Beyond2 (S10+); BeyondX (S10 5G)
- Hearing aid compatibility: M3/T3
- Website: "Samsung Galaxy S10e, S10 & S10+ Features & Highlights | Samsung US". Samsung Electronics America.

The Samsung Galaxy S10 is a series of Android-based smartphones manufactured, developed, designed and marketed by Samsung Electronics as part of its flagship Galaxy S series mainly in 4G LTE versions with a 5G-compatible version also available. For this iteration, five different models were released (a first in the Galaxy S series): the Galaxy S10e, Galaxy S10, Galaxy S10+, and the Galaxy S10 5G were all announced on 20 February 2019 (during the Galaxy Unpacked press event alongside the Galaxy Fold, the Galaxy Watch Active, the Galaxy Fit/Fit e and the Galaxy Buds), and made available to most countries in the following month; a mid-range variant, the Galaxy S10 Lite, was announced on 3 January 2020, alongside the Galaxy Note 10 Lite.

The Galaxy S10 models were the first in the Galaxy S series with a punch-hole display and an under-screen fingerprint scanner, and the last with a 3.5mm headphone jack (except the S10 Lite) and a physical Bixby button (except the S10 Lite), as well as the last without a 120 Hz display.

On 6 March 2020, Samsung launched the successors to the S10e & S10 & S10+, the Galaxy S20 & S20+. The Galaxy S10 5G has been succeeded indirectly by the Galaxy S20 & S20+ and directly by the Galaxy S20 Ultra, which also came in a 4G LTE-only model sold in select regions. The S10e and S10 Lite were later succeeded by the Galaxy S20 FE.

== Specifications ==
=== Hardware ===
==== Chipsets ====
Like the predecessors, chipsets used for the devices (except for the S10 Lite) vary by country. International models of the S10 use the Exynos 9820 system-on-chip, while the U.S., Canadian, and Chinese models use the Qualcomm Snapdragon 855.

The Galaxy S10 Lite, meanwhile, uses the Qualcomm Snapdragon 855 worldwide, which is also used on select models of the first four S10 devices.

==== Display ====
The S10 line have five models with various display specifications which include Dynamic AMOLED displays (superAMOLED for S10 Lite) with HDR10+ support and dynamic tone mapping technology. For the first time in the Galaxy S series, all S10 models began using a punch-hole display (branded as Infinity-O) instead of using a traditional notch.

The S10, S10+, and S10 5G have a curved screen on its sides that slope over the horizontal edges of the device, while the S10e and S10 Lite have a flat display. This iteration also mark the first time to have an on-screen fingerprint reader (ultrasonic for the S10, S10+, and S10 5G, while optical for the S10 Lite). The S10e continues to have a physical fingerprint reader (embedded on the power button).

The ultrasonic fingerprint readers outperform optical in-screen models but aren't compatible with all screen protectors. Due to this, the phones ship with a pre-installed plastic screen protector.

Spec	Galaxy S10 Lite	Galaxy S10e	Galaxy S10	Galaxy S10+	Galaxy S10 5G
Display size	6.7 in (170 mm)	5.8 in (147 mm)	6.1 in (155 mm)	6.4 in (163 mm)	6.7 in (170 mm)
Resolution	2400×1080	2280×1080	3040×1440		
Density	~394 ppi	~438 ppi	~550 ppi	~522 ppi	~502 ppi
Aspect ratio	20:9	19:9			
Panel	superAMOLED, HDR10+	Dynamic AMOLED, HDR10+			
Cover glass	Corning Gorilla Glass 3+	Corning Gorilla Glass 5	Corning Gorilla Glass 6		
Ref.					

==== Cameras ====
The S10 features a 3-lens rear-facing camera setup; it retains the dual-aperture 12 MP and 12 MP telephoto lenses of the Galaxy S9+, but now uses a camera module introduced on the Note 9 and also adds a 16 MP ultra-wide angle lens. The front-facing camera on the S10+ is accompanied by a second RGB depth sensor, which Samsung states helps improve the quality of photo effects and augmented reality image filters.

Both devices support rear-facing 4K (2160p) video recording at 60 frames per second. The front camera records in 2160p as well, at 30 frames per second, raising the front-facing video resolution from the 1440p that had been in place since the Note 4 (2014) and S6 (2015). The rear-facing camera supports HDR10+ video capture for the first time on the S series.

The camera software includes a new "Shot Suggestion" feature to assist users, "Artistic Live Filters", as well as the ability to post directly to Instagram posts and stories. The S10+ uses a double hole punch design for the front camera, while the S10 uses a single hole punch design. The Galaxy S10e and S10 make use of "advanced heat-pipe" cooling systems, but the more expensive Galaxy S10+ uses a vapor chamber cooling system.

In the manual mode, the exposure time can be increased up to ten seconds.

==== Models ====
Alongside the main S10 and S10+, Samsung also unveiled two additional models. The S10e is a compact version of the S10, featuring a smaller, flat, 5.8-inch 1080p display with no curved edges. Its fingerprint reader is contained within the power button on the right side rather than in-display, and it excludes the 12-megapixel telephoto camera of the S10. It still includes the dual-aperture 12-megapixel and 16-megapixel ultra-wide-angle sensors. It has a smaller battery.

There is also a larger, phablet-sized premium model known as the S10 5G, which features support for 5G wireless networks, a 6.7-inch display, 256 or 512 GB of non-expandable storage, additional 3D time-of-flight cameras on both the front and rear, and a non-user-replaceable 4,500 mAh battery. This model was temporarily exclusive to Verizon Wireless on launch in 2019 before expanding to other carriers in the weeks after launch. It is the first Samsung model in the Galaxy S series alongside the S20 5G UW that does not feature the microSD card slot since the Galaxy S6 in 2015.

Charging speeds are 25 W on the S10 5G & S10 Lite, and 15 W on the S10e, the first two of which mark the first increase since the 2014 Galaxy Note 4 and 2015 Galaxy S6.

The S10 series (except the S10 Lite) is the last models in the Galaxy S series to feature a 3.5 mm headphone jack, as its successors, the S20, S20+, and S20 Ultra, do not.

On 20 January 2020, the S10 Lite was released. It is a mid-range variant of the S10, containing the same cameras as the main variant. It features 128 GB of expandable storage, a 6.7-inch 1080p screen on an aluminum frame, and a 4,500 mAh battery. This variant removes the 3.5 mm headphone jack featured on all of the 2019 variants of the S10, as well as wireless charging, instead being equipped with 25 W Super Fast Charging picked up from the Galaxy Note 10. Unlike the main variants, the S10 Lite is only offered with Snapdragon 855 chipset.

==== Colors ====
Galaxy S10e, S10, and S10+ are available in the colors Prism White, Prism Black, Prism Green, Prism Blue, Prism Silver, Cardinal Red, Flamingo Pink, and Smoke Blue. Galaxy S10e is also available in Canary Yellow. Galaxy S10 5G comes in the colors Crown Silver, Majestic Black, and Royal Gold. Galaxy S10+ and Galaxy S10+ Performance Edition offer two additional color choices: Ceramic Black and White. The Performance Edition ceramic models offer 12 GB RAM and 1 TB of internal storage.

=== Software ===
The S10 range ships with Android 9.0 "Pie". They are the first Samsung smartphones to ship with a major revamp of Samsung's Android user experience known as One UI. A main design element of One UI is intentional repositioning of key user interface elements in stock apps to improve usability on large screens. Many apps include large headers that push the beginning of content towards the center of the display, while navigation controls and other prompts are often displayed near the bottom of the display instead.

Samsung released the Android 10 update to the Galaxy S10 series on 28 November 2019. The update includes One UI version 2.0.

On 18 August 2020, it was announced by Samsung that all variants of the S10 series had promised 3 years of major Android OS and security updates and 1 additional year of security-exclusive updates for a total of 4 years worth of updates.

An official list released by Samsung on 2 December 2020, further confirmed that all S10 models would be receiving the Android 11 upgrade with One UI 3.0.

In January 2022, the Galaxy S10 series received the Android 12 upgrade with One UI 4, which marked the last major operating system upgrade for the series. Due to its later release date with Android 10, the Galaxy S10 Lite was expected to receive its final major software update, with Samsung announcing in October 2022 that it would receive Android 13 and One UI 5.

The first four Galaxy S10 phones reached its end of life in April 2023 with the March 2023 security patch, while the Galaxy S10 Lite reached its end of life in March 2024 with the January 2024 security patch.

== Known issues ==
The fingerprint scanner had a security flaw that allowed anyone to unlock the phone with a silicone screen protector, which also affected the Note 10. Samsung rolled out a patch to fix this problem on 23 October 2019. Some users reported software bugs in the Samsung Galaxy S10 Plus and the Note 10 Plus that caused the navigation buttons and the recent applications shortcuts to overlap. Samsung fixed the issue in the next update.

== Reception ==
Dan Seifert from The Verge gave the S10 a score of 8.5/10, praising its excellent display, performance, battery life, versatile camera system and headphone jack inclusion. However, he noted that the new in-screen fingerprint scanner was slower and more finicky and camera performance was not as good as the Google Pixel 3's in low light.

Andrei Frumusanu from AnandTech reported that the Exynos 9820 performed significantly better than the previous year's Exynos 9810, although he also stated that the Exynos 9820 still couldn't keep up with the Snapdragon 855. The Exynos 9820 was stated to be a lot less efficient than the Snapdragon but despite that in the Web Browsing test it actually outdid the Snapdragon by 0.33 hours; the Exynos however suffered in the PCMark battery life test scoring a 0.55-hour deficit compared to the Snapdragon equipped model.

Marques Brownlee praised the S10's One UI for improving one-handed usability. He labelled the S10+ as one of the few $1000 smartphones that are worth their price tag.

Jeffrey Van Camp from Wired rated the S10 9/10 for its all-screen design, fun features, ultrasonic fingerprint sensor, wireless charging with power sharing and headphone jack inclusion. His complaints were that the camera, while fantastic, still couldn't rival the Pixel 3's night shots, it could be difficult to find what the user wanted in the settings menus, wireless power sharing was slow and the edges needed palm rejection.

The S10+ received an overall score of 109 from DXOMARK; it had a photo score of 114, a video score of 97, and a selfie score of 96. The S10 5G received an overall score of 112, tying it as the site's top ranked phone at the time along with the Huawei P30 Pro. It had a photo score of 117, a video score of 100, and a selfie score of 97.

Sales of the S10 have exceeded that of the preceding S9, with the S10+ being the most popular model followed by the regular S10 and then the S10e.

== Gallery ==
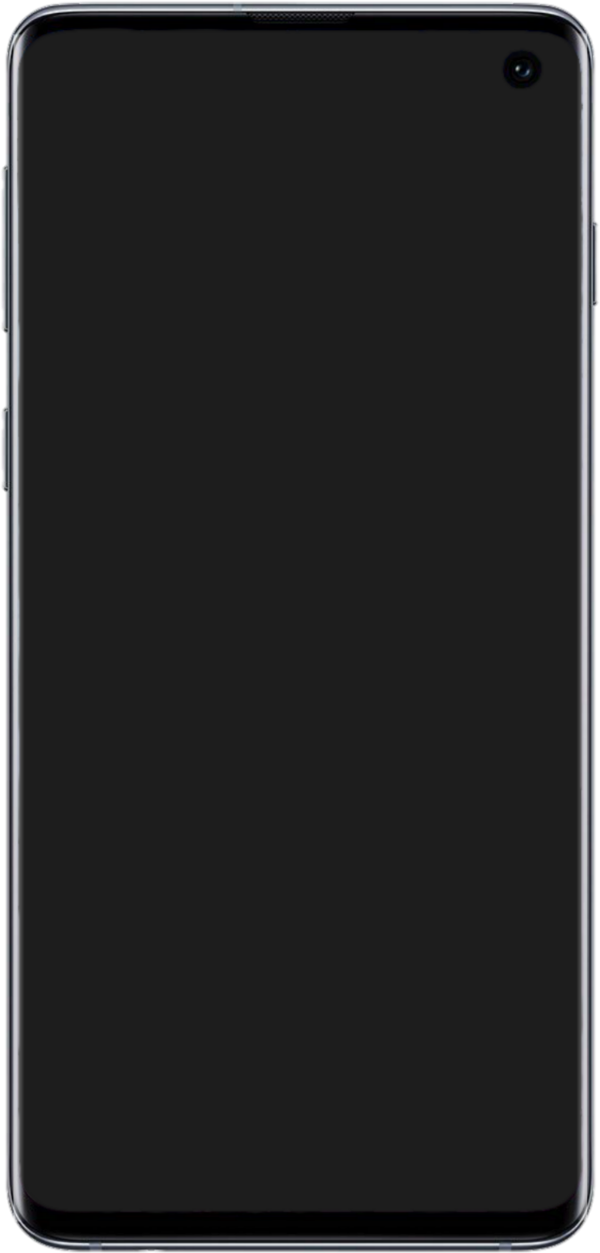
Samsung Galaxy S10

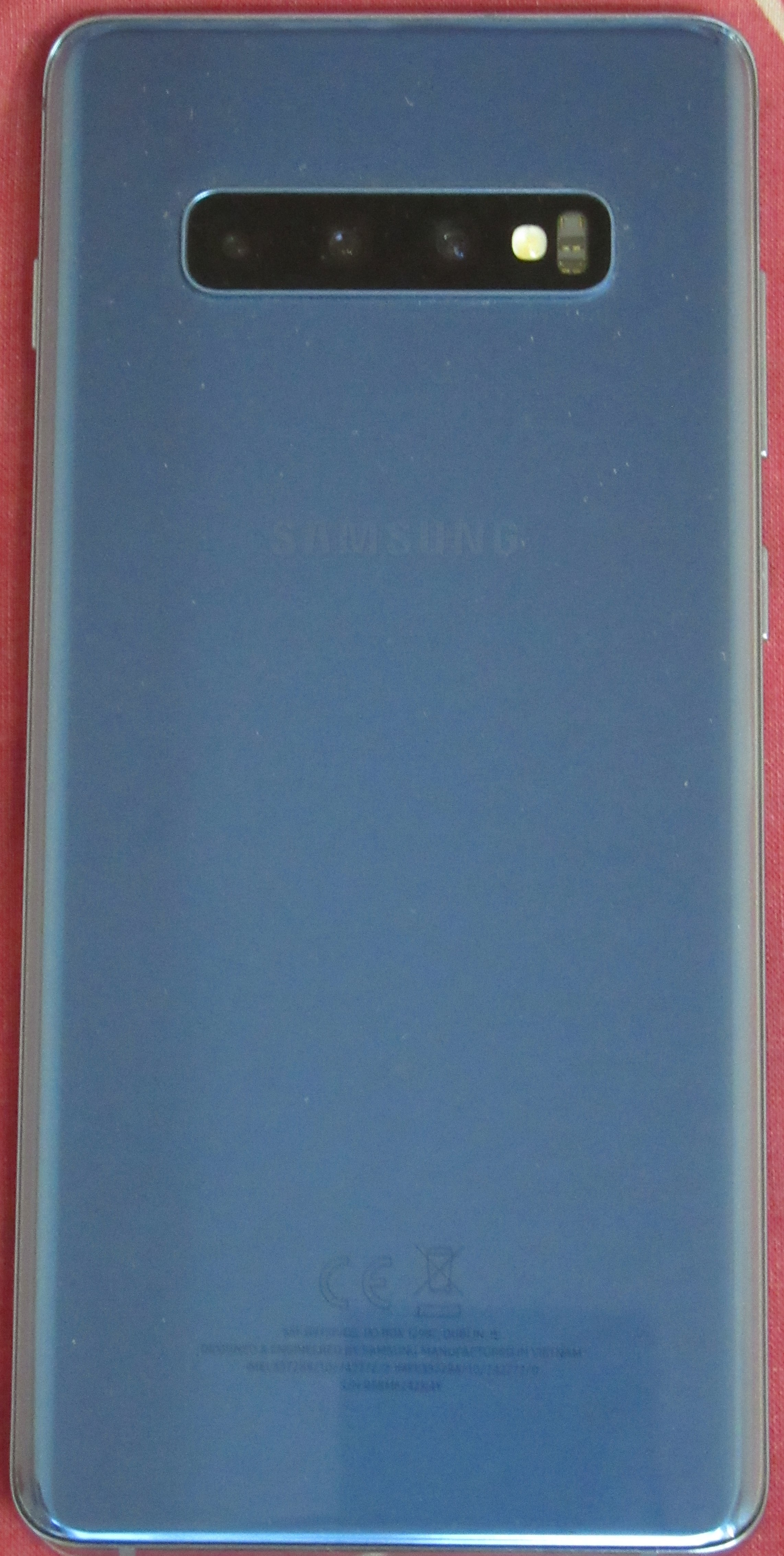
Back side of a Prism Blue S10+

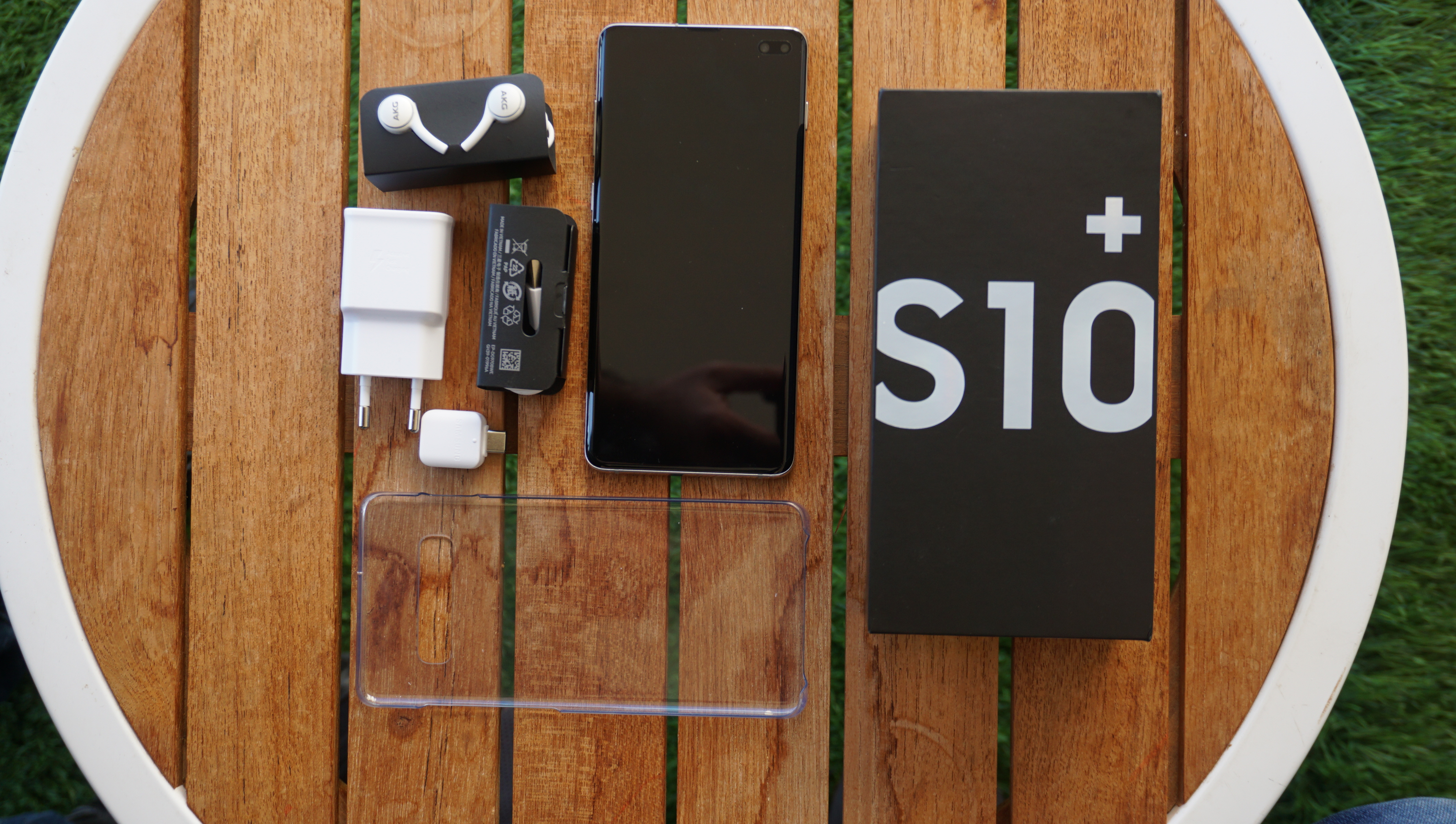
The S10+'s scope of delivery

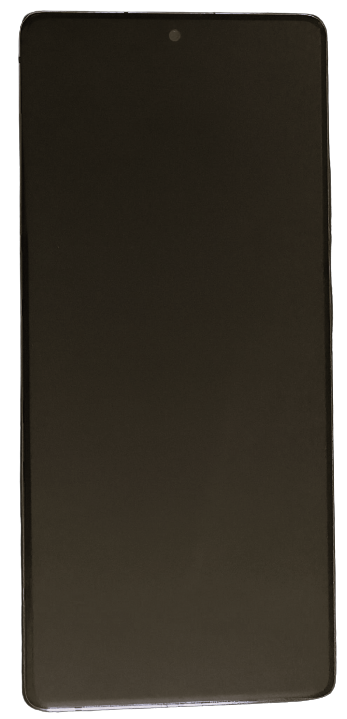
Samsung Galaxy S10 Lite

== See also ==
- Samsung Galaxy
- Comparison of Samsung Galaxy S smartphones

Preceded by Samsung Galaxy S9	Samsung Galaxy S10; 2019	Succeeded by Samsung Galaxy S20
