= Samsung Galaxy Buds series =

Series of wireless earbuds by Samsung Electronics

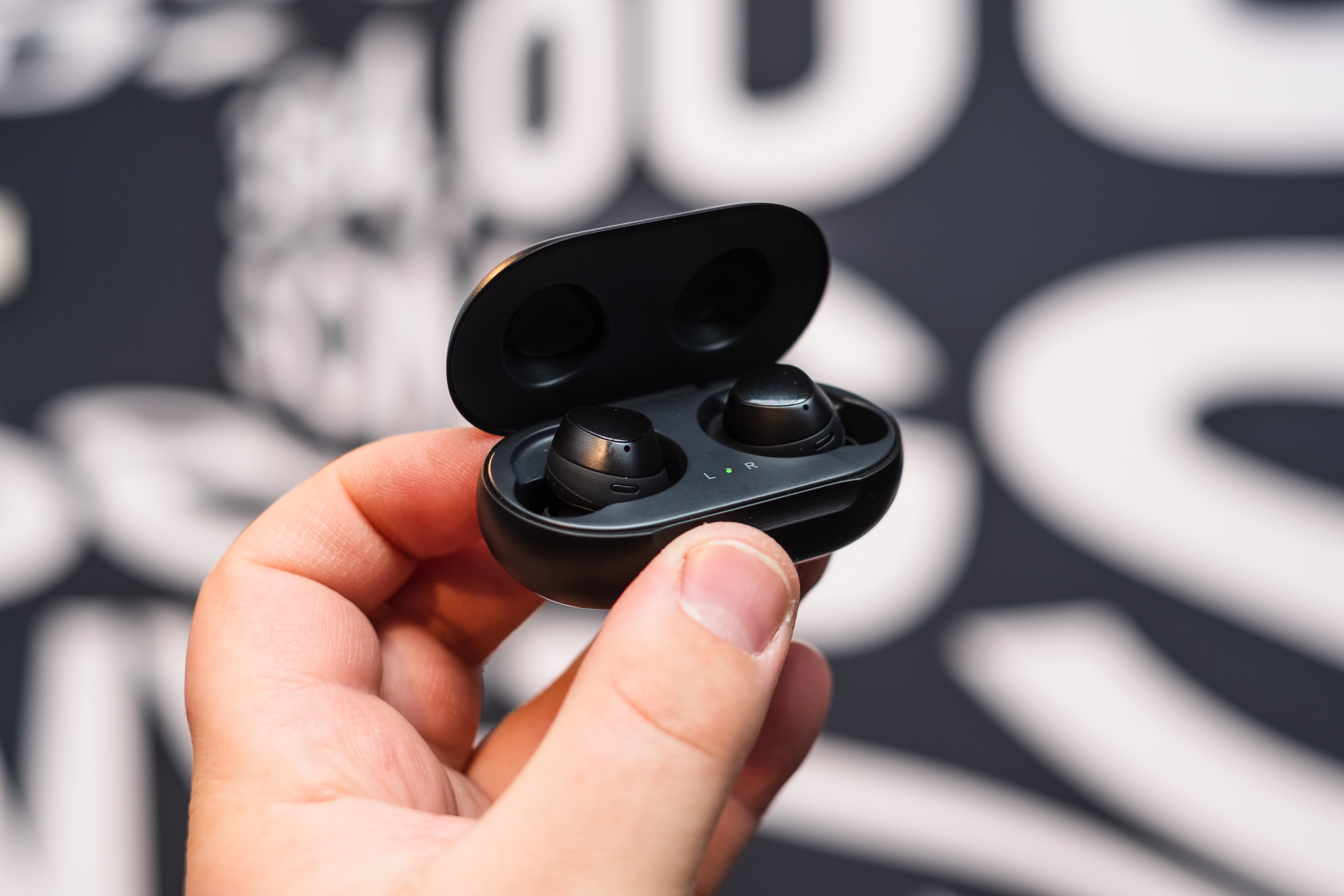
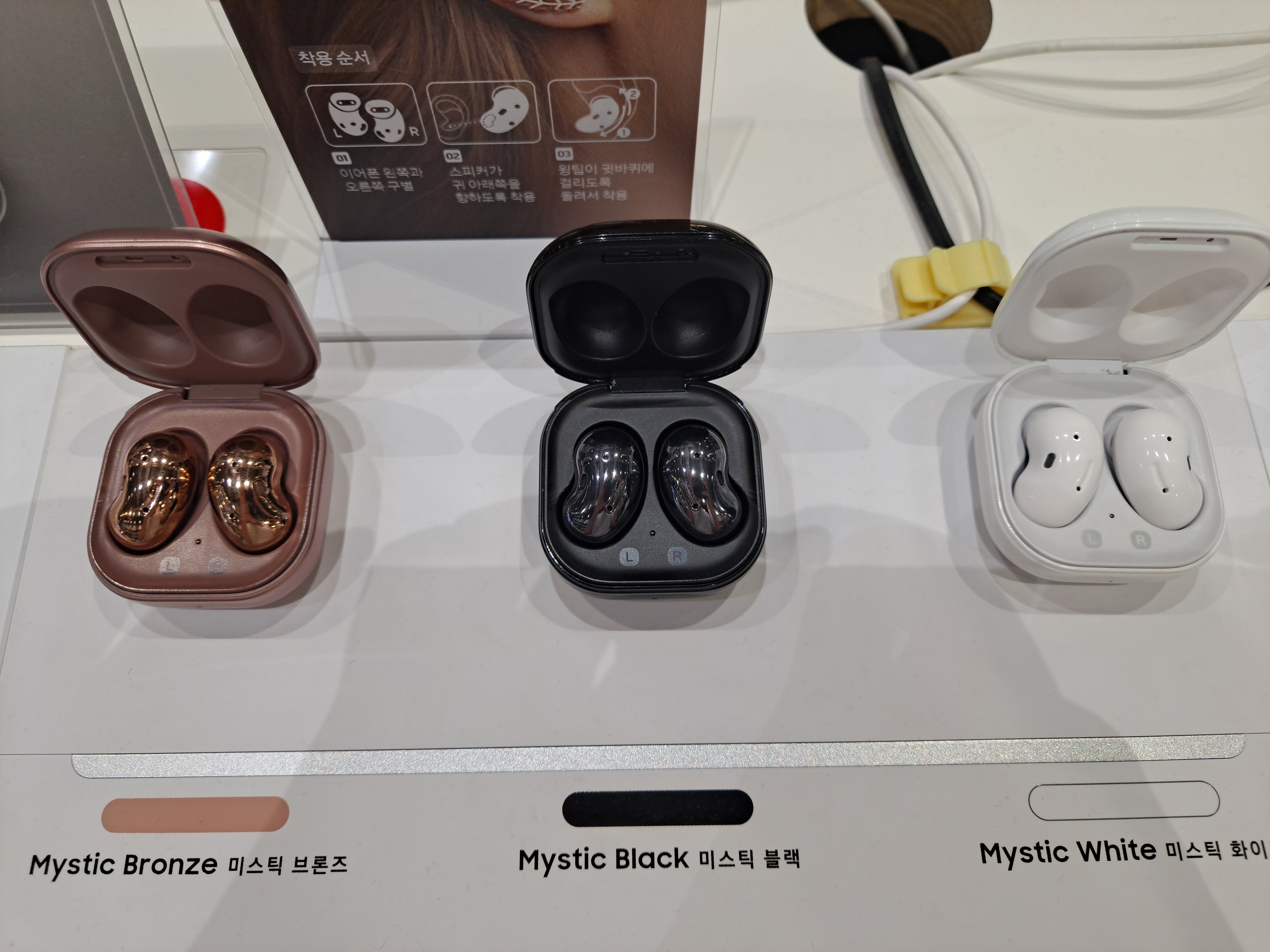
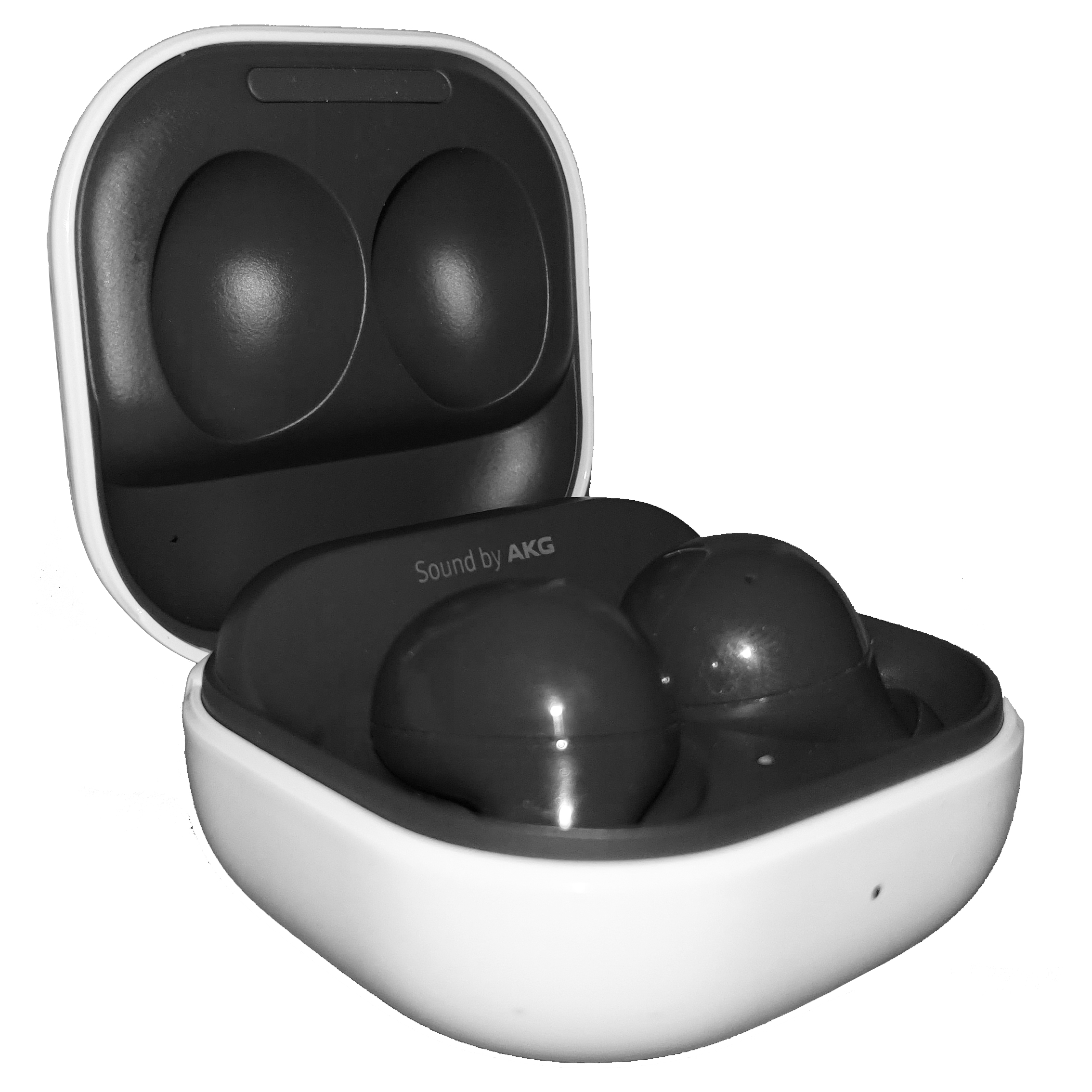
- From left to right: A pair of original Galaxy Buds; a store display of Galaxy Buds Live in bronze, black, and white; a pair of Galaxy Buds 2
- Developer: Samsung Electronics
- Manufacturer: Samsung Electronics
- Product family: Samsung
- Type: Wireless earbuds
- Released: Galaxy Buds: March 9, 2019; Galaxy Buds Plus: February 14, 2020; Galaxy Buds Live: August 6, 2020; Galaxy Buds Pro: January 14, 2021; Galaxy Buds 2: August 27, 2021; Galaxy Buds 2 Pro: August 26, 2022; Galaxy Buds FE: October 5, 2023; Galaxy Buds 3: July 24, 2024; Galaxy Buds 3 Pro: July 24, 2024; Galaxy Buds Core: June 26, 2025; Galaxy Buds 3 FE: August 18, 2025; Galaxy Buds 4: March 11, 2026; Galaxy Buds 4 Pro: March 11, 2026
- Connectivity: Bluetooth
- Predecessor: Samsung Gear
- Related: Samsung Galaxy Watch series Samsung Galaxy Fit series
- Website: Official website

The Samsung Galaxy Buds series is a line of Wireless Bluetooth earbuds manufactured, developed and designed by Samsung Electronics. The 1st generation was first announced on February 20, 2019, at the Samsung's Galaxy Unpacked, alongside the Galaxy S10 series, the Galaxy Fold, the Galaxy Watch Active and the Galaxy Fit/Fit e, it was released on March 9, 2019, as the successor to the Gear IconX.

Galaxy Buds series release timeline
2019	Samsung Galaxy Buds
2020	Samsung Galaxy Buds Plus
2020	Samsung Galaxy Buds Live
2021	Samsung Galaxy Buds Pro
2021	Samsung Galaxy Buds 2
2022	Samsung Galaxy Buds 2 Pro
2023	Samsung Galaxy Buds FE
2024	Samsung Galaxy Buds 3 / Buds 3 Pro
2025	Samsung Galaxy Buds Core
2025	Samsung Galaxy Buds 3 FE
2026	Samsung Galaxy Buds 4 / Buds 4 Pro
2026	Samsung Galaxy Buds On

== Line-up ==
Name	Launch date	Availability	Colors	Speakers	Microphones	Battery life (w/ case)	Wireless charging	Reference
Galaxy Buds	2019-03-08	Discontinued	White, Yellow, Black, and Aura Glow Silver	1-way Dynamic	1 Outer + 1 Inner	6hr (13hr)	Yes - Qi Certified	
Galaxy Buds Plus	2020-02-14	Discontinued	White, Blue, Red, Deep Blue, Pink, and Black	2-way Dynamic (Woofer + Tweeter)	2 Outer + 1 Inner	11hr (22hr)	Yes - Qi Certified	
Galaxy Buds Live	2020-08-17	Discontinued	Mystic White, Mystic Bronze, Mystic Black, and Mystic Onyx	12 mm	2 outer, 1 inner, and a voice pickup unit	5.5-8hr (Up to 28hr)	Yes - Qi Certified	
Galaxy Buds Pro	2021-01-14	Discontinued	Phantom Black, Phantom Silver, and Phantom Violet	2-way (11 mm, 6.5 mm tweeter)	2 outer, 1 inner, and a voice pickup unit	5–8hr (up to 28hr)	Yes - Qi Certified	
Galaxy Buds2	2021-08-11	Discontinued	Olive, Lavender, White, Graphite, and Onyx	2-way Dynamic (Woofer + Tweeter)	3 Mics + VPU	5-7.5hr (Up to 29hr)	Yes - Qi Certified	
Galaxy Buds2 Pro	2022-08-26	Discontinued	Bora Purple, Graphite, and White	2-way Dynamic (24-bit Hi-Fi)	3 Mics (High SNR) + VPU	5-8hr	Yes - Qi Certified	
Galaxy Buds FE	2023-10-05	Discontinued	White, Graphite, and Black	1-way Dynamic	2 outer, 1 inner, and a voice pickup unit	8.5hr (Up to 30hr)	No	
Galaxy Buds3	2024-07-24	Discontinued	Silver and White	1-way (11 mm Dynamic)	3 Mics + VPU	5-6Hr (Up to 30hr)	Yes - Qi Certified	
Galaxy Buds3 Pro	2024-07-24	Discontinued	Silver and White	2-way (Woofer + Tweeter)	3 Mics (High SNR) + VPU	5-6hr (Up to 30hr)	Yes - Qi Certified	
Galaxy Buds Core	2025-06-27	Available for purchase	White and Black	1-way	2 Outer + 1 Inner	5-7.5hr (Up to 35hr)	No	
Galaxy Buds3 FE	2025-09-04	Available for purchase	Black and Grey	1-way	3 Mics	6-8.5hr (Up to 30hr)	No	
Galaxy Buds4	2026-02-25	Available for purchase	White and Black	1-way (11 mm)	3 Mics + VPU	5-6hr (Up to 30hr)	Yes - Qi Certified	
Galaxy Buds4 Pro	2026-02-25	Available for purchase	White, Black and Pink Gold	2-way (11 mm, 5.5 mm tweeter)	3 Mics (High SNR) + VPU	6-7hr (Up to 30hr)	Yes - Qi Certified	

== Models ==
=== 1st generation ===
==== Galaxy Buds ====
The original Galaxy Buds (SM-R170) launched on March 8, 2019. The launch price was $129.99, and included a wireless charging case. The Buds were discontinued when the Buds Plus was released.

==== Galaxy Buds Plus ====
The Galaxy Buds Plus (SM-R175) was announced on February 11, 2020, at the spring Galaxy Unpacked event, alongside the Galaxy S20 series and the Galaxy Z Flip. The Buds Plus was released on February 14, priced at $149.99, a $20 price increase from the original Buds. The Buds Plus maintained the same design as the original Buds, but reviewers praised the improved sound and microphone quality and significantly increased battery life. Additionally, a second driver for bass was included to enhance audio quality at lower frequencies.

==== Galaxy Buds Pro ====
The Galaxy Buds Pro (SM-R190) was announced on January 14, 2021, alongside the Galaxy S21 series, and launched the following day, on January 15. The Buds Pro improved upon the design of the Galaxy Buds Plus and included improved audio, head tracking technology, and active noise cancellation. It was praised for their improved design and sound quality, but criticized for their 5-hour battery life when active noise cancellation is on.

==== Galaxy Buds FE ====
The Galaxy Buds FE, short for "Fan Edition", was released on October 5, 2023 for US$100, alongside the Galaxy S23 FE and the Galaxy Tab S9 FE/FE+, marketed as an affordable alternative to the other Galaxy Buds models. Its specifications include a 30-hour battery life with active noise cancellation disabled and the charging case and an IPX2 water resistance rating, as opposed to the 2 Pro's IPX7.

=== 2nd generation ===
==== Galaxy Buds 2 ====
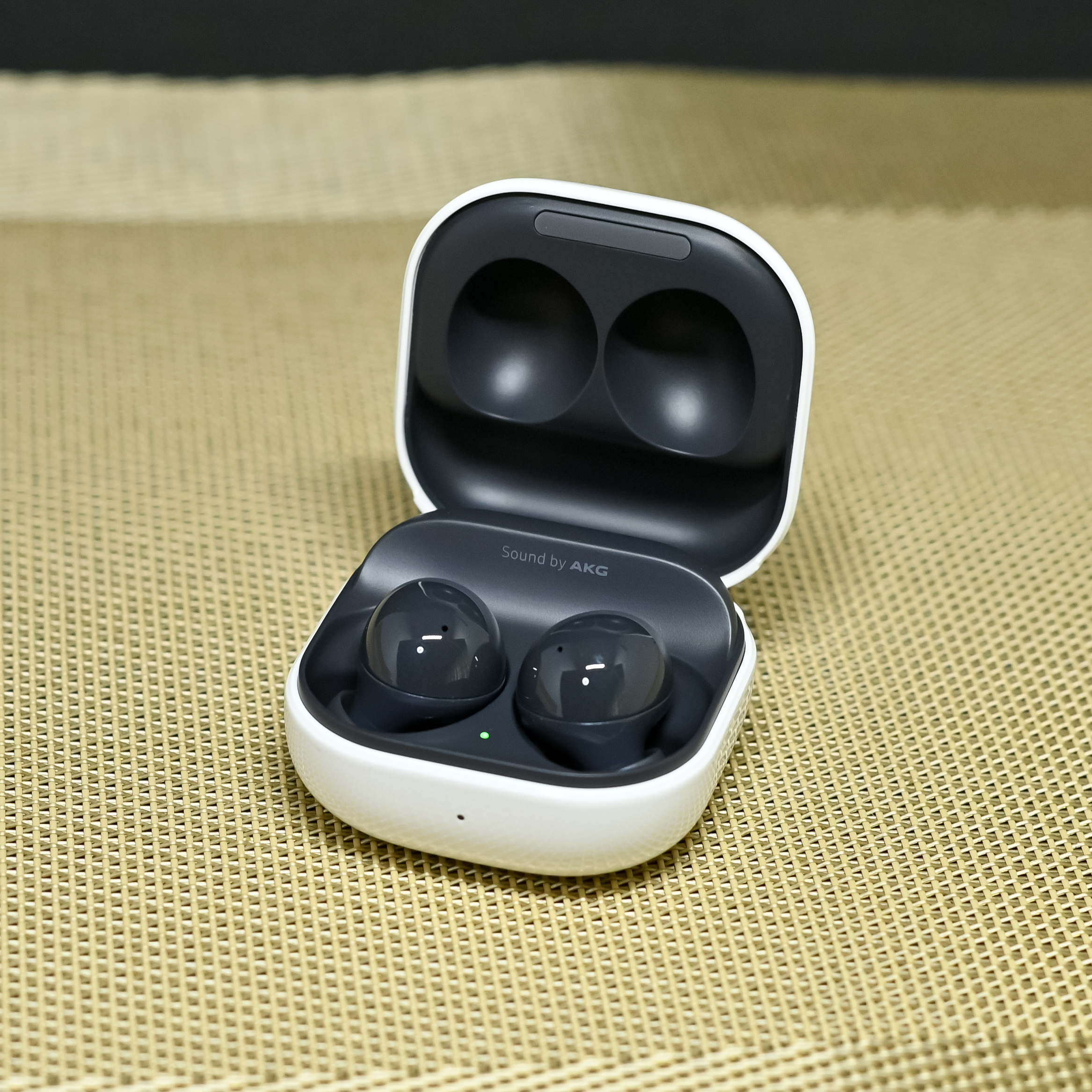
Samsung Galaxy Buds 2 with white charging case

The Samsung Galaxy Buds 2 (SM-R177) was announced on August 11, 2021, at Galaxy Unpacked alongside the Galaxy Z Fold 3, the Galaxy Z Flip 3 and the Galaxy Watch 4 series. The Buds 2 was seen as the successor to the Buds Plus, which was discontinued following the announcement. The Buds 2 includes active noise cancellation, and cost less than the Buds Pro, and was praised for their all around performance for the price.

==== Galaxy Buds 2 Pro ====
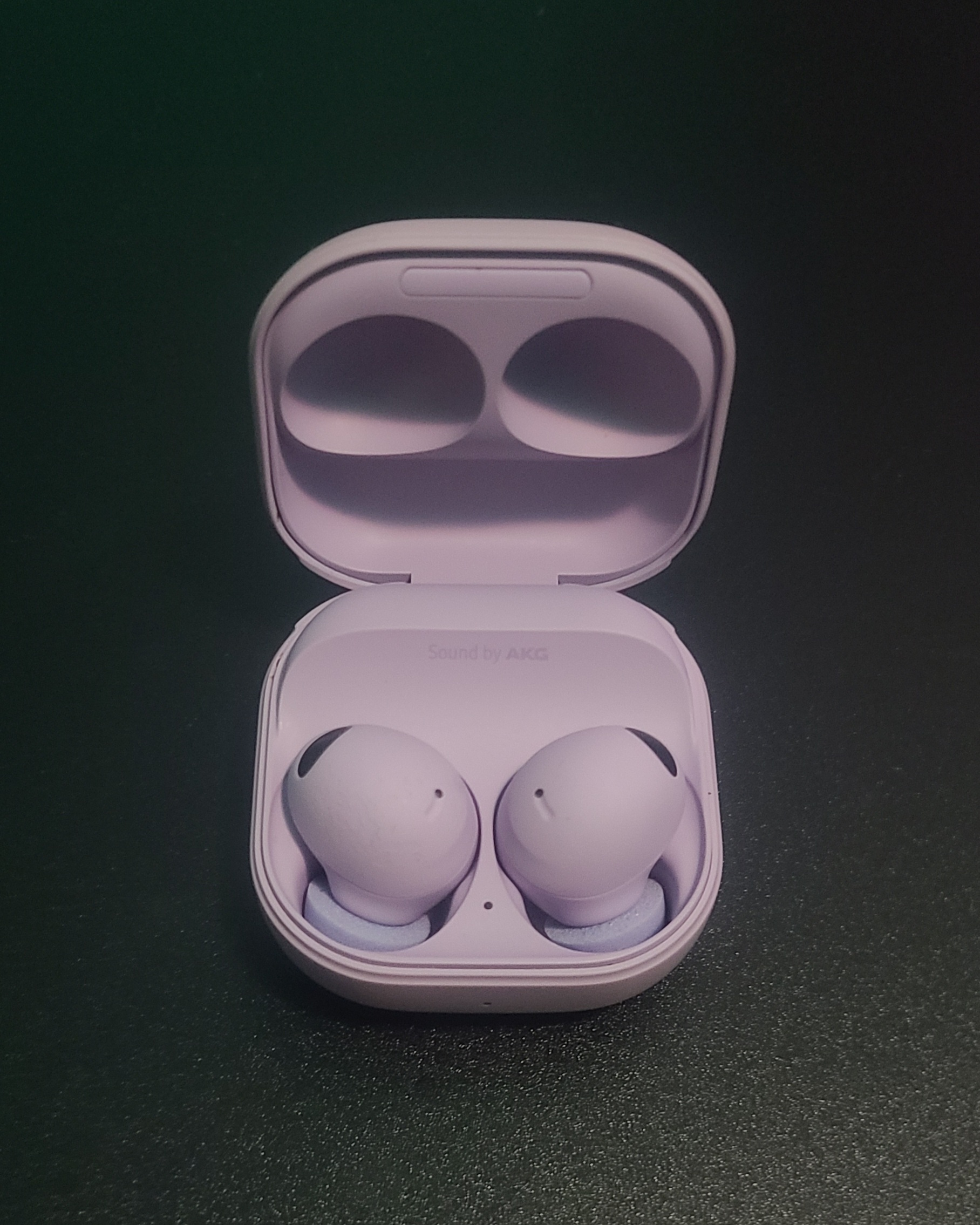
A pair of lavender Samsung Galaxy Buds 2 Pro with custom eartips

The Galaxy Buds 2 Pro (SM-R510) was announced on August 10, 2022, at Galaxy Unpacked alongside the Galaxy Z Fold 4, the Galaxy Z Flip 4 and the Galaxy Watch 5 series. The Buds 2 Pro was seen as the successor to the Buds Pro, which was discontinued following the announcement. The Buds 2 Pro includes active noise cancellation, 24-bit Hi-Fi audio support (only for Samsung device with One UI 4.0 or above) and enhanced 360-degree audio. It was released on August 26, 2022, with a launch price of $229.99, a $30 price increase compared to the original Galaxy Buds Pro.

=== 3rd generation ===
==== Galaxy Buds 3 ====
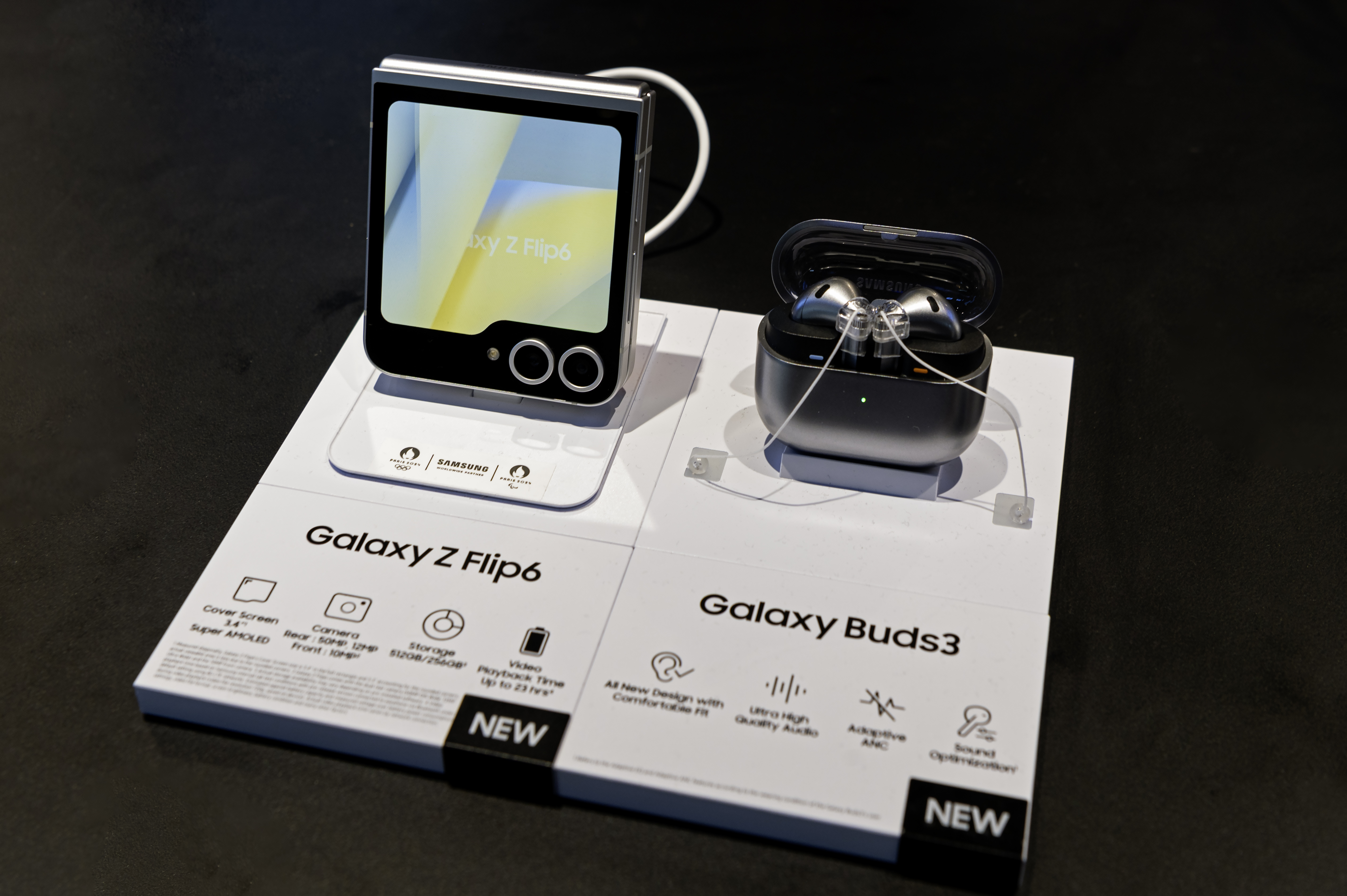
Samsung Galaxy Buds 3 with Samsung Galaxy Z Flip 6

The Galaxy Buds 3 (SM-R530) was announced on July 10, 2024, at Galaxy Unpacked, alongside the Galaxy Z Fold 6, the Galaxy Z Flip 6, the Galaxy Watch 7, the Galaxy Watch Ultra and the Galaxy Ring. Positioned as the standard model in Samsung's 3rd generation Galaxy Buds lineup, the Buds 3 introduced a new stem-style design, replacing the rounded form factor used in earlier non Pro models. Compared to the Buds 3 Pro, the Buds 3 focuses on everyday listening, while still offering active noise cancellation and 360 degree audio support. It was released on July 24, 2024, with a launch price of $179.99, placing them below the Buds 3 Pro in Samsung's wireless earbud lineup.

==== Galaxy Buds 3 Pro ====
The Galaxy Buds 3 Pro (SM-R630) was announced on July 10, 2024. The Buds 3 Pro is seen as the successor to the Buds 2 Pro, featuring a new stem design and enhanced audio technology with AI capabilities. The Buds 3 Pro includes high-resolution audio support (24-bit/96kHz lossless quality, only for compatible Samsung devices), ultra-wideband call support, 360-degree audio, active noise cancellation (ANC), adaptive equalizer, and an instant translator. It was released on July 24, 2024, with a launch price of $249.99, a $20 price increase compared to the original Galaxy Buds 2 Pro.

==== Galaxy Buds 3 FE ====
The Galaxy Buds 3 FE (SM-R420) was announced on August 18, 2025, seen as the successor to the Buds FE. Positioned as an affordable alternative in the 3rd generation wireless lineup, the Buds 3 FE deliver features like active noise cancellation and Galaxy AI integration with a stem design. It was released on September 4, 2025, with a launch price of $149.99.

=== 4th generation ===
==== Galaxy Buds 4 Pro ====
The Galaxy Buds 4 Pro (SM-R640) was announced on February 25, 2026, as the successor to the Galaxy Buds 3 Pro. These earbuds utilize a canal-fit design and feature a refined blade with a premium metal finish and engraved pinch controls. It was released on March 11, 2026, and is available in Black and White, alongside an online-exclusive Pink Gold colorway.

=== Standalone ===
==== Galaxy Buds Live ====
The Galaxy Buds Live (SM-R180) was announced on August 5, 2020, during a virtual Galaxy Unpacked event, alongside the Galaxy Note 20 series, the Galaxy Z Fold 2, the Galaxy Tab S7 series and the Galaxy Watch 3. The Buds Live was notable for their "bean" like on-ear design, a departure from the previous in ear design used in the Buds lineup. The Buds Live was the first Galaxy Buds device to launch with active noise cancellation. It was praised for its design, but criticized for the ineffective active noise cancellation. Product review site, 'BestReviews' wrote "Unlike the rest of the Galaxy Buds lineup, the bean-shaped Galaxy Buds Live is on-ear buds that rest just outside the ear canal. People who have trouble with in-ear buds may find the Buds Live more to its liking. We found when we tested a pair of Buds Live that it ultimately felts more secure than competing earbuds after a short adjustment period."

==== Galaxy Buds Core ====
The Samsung Galaxy Buds Core (SM-R410) was announced in mid-2025. The Buds Core is seen as the successor to the Galaxy Buds FE, offering active noise cancellation (ANC), Bluetooth 5.4 connectivity, and AI-powered features such as real-time language translation and interpretation. It has an IP54 rating for dust and water resistance and deliver up to 35 hours of total playback time with ANC off. The Galaxy Buds Core was released on June 27, 2025, in India and the UAE, with a launch price of approximately 189 AED, positioning them as an affordable option within Samsung's wireless earbuds lineup. In addition, Samsung's budget-friendly new wireless earbuds, the Galaxy Buds Core, were launched in Turkey on July 11, 2025, priced at 2,299 TL and made available through Samsung stores and authorized retailers.

== Specifications ==
Product	Buds4 Pro	Buds4	Buds3 FE	Buds Core	Buds3 Pro	Buds3	Buds FE	Buds2 Pro	Buds2	Buds Pro	Buds Live	Buds+	Buds
Earbuds size	18.1 x 19.6 x 30.9 mm	18.3 x 19.3 x 30.5 mm	18.0 x 21.1 x 33.8 mm	19.2 × 17.1 × 22.2 mm	18.1 × 19.8 × 33.2 mm	18.1 X 20.4 X 31.9 mm	19.0 × 17.0 × 22.0 mm	21.6 × 19.9 × 18.7 mm	17.0 × 20.9 × 21.1 mm	20.5 × 19.5 × 20.8 mm	16.5 × 27.3 × 14.9 mm	17.5 × 22.5 × 19.2 mm	
Earbuds weight	5.1g	4.6g	5.0 g	5.3 g	5.4 g	4.7 g	5.6 g	5.5 g	5 g	6.3 g	5.6 g	6.3 g	5.6 g
Case size	51 x 51 x 28.3 mm		50.0 × 50.0 × 27.7 mm	50.2 × 50.4 × 27.7 mm	48.7 × 58.9 × 24.4 mm		48.7 x 58.9 x 24.4 mm	50 × 50 × 28 mm	50 × 50.2 × 27.8 mm			70 × 38.8 × 26.5 mm	
Case weight	44.3g	45.1g	41.8 g	31.2 g	46.5 g		40.0 g	43.3 g	41.2 g	44.9 g	42.2 g	39.6 g	
Bluetooth version	Bluetooth 6.1		Bluetooth 5.4				Bluetooth 5.2	Bluetooth 5.3	Bluetooth 5.2	Bluetooth 5.0			
Sensors	Accelerometer, Gyroscope sensor, Hall sensor, Proximity sensor (SWIR), Touch sensor, Voice Pickup Unit	Accelerometer, Gyroscope sensor, Hall sensor, Proximity sensor (IR), Touch sensor, Voice Pickup Unit	Proximity sensor, Hall sensor, Touch sensor, Pressure sensor	Hall sensor, Proximity sensor, Touch sensor	Accelerometer, Gyroscope sensor, Hall sensor, Pressure sensor, Proximity sensor, Touch sensor, Voice Pickup Unit		Proximity sensor, Hall sensor, Touch sensor	Accelerometer, Gyro sensor, Hall sensor, Proximity sensor, Touch sensor, Voice Pickup Unit	Accelerometer, Hall sensor, Proximity sensor, Touch sensor	Accelerometer, Gyro sensor, Proximity sensor, Hall sensor, Touch sensor, Voice Pickup Unit	Accelerometer, IR sensor, Hall sensor, Touch sensor, Grip sensor, Voice Pickup Unit	Accelerometer, IR sensor, Hall sensor, Touch sensor	Accelerometer, Hall sensor, Proximity sensor, Touch sensor
Battery	Earbuds: 61 mAh; Case: 530 mAh	Earbuds: 45 mAh; Case: 515 mAh	Earbuds: 53 mAh; Case: 515 mAh	Earbuds: 65 mAh; Case: 500 mAh	Earbuds: 53 mAh; Case: 515 mAh	Earbuds: 48 mAh; Case: 515 mAh	Earbuds: 60 mAh; Case: 479 mAh	Earbuds: 58 mAh; Case: 500 mAh	Earbuds: 61 mAh; Case: 472 mAh		Earbuds: 60 mAh; Case: 500 mAh	Earbuds: 85 mAh; Case: 270 mAh	Earbuds: 58 mAh; Case: 252 mAh
Charging	USB-C and Qi wireless charging												
