= Galaxy Unpacked =

Samsung consumer electronics launch event

- Frequency: Typically twice a year
- Years active: Since 2009
- Inaugurated: 2009; 17 years ago
- Most recent: August 27, 2026; 2 months ago
- Organizer: Samsung Electronics
- Website: www.samsung.com/global/galaxy/events/

Galaxy Unpacked is an annual event held by Samsung Electronics where it showcases new mobile devices for consumers, including smartphones, tablets, and wearables. It was first held as Samsung Mobile Unpacked in June 2009 at the CommunicAsia event at the Singapore Expo in Singapore. For successive releases, the event has frequently been held in Barcelona, New York City, and San Francisco and, as of 2015, it has been branded under the Galaxy Unpacked moniker.

The event includes keynote presentations for product launches, delivered by company management figures. Attendees can visit exhibits and have hands-on experiences of the products in demonstration zones. Live broadcasts of Galaxy Unpacked feature a piece of pre-roll music from the Samsung Galaxy franchise, often a customized version of "Over the Horizon", and a repeated animation. Only Samsung executives, members of the press, social media influencers, and select Samsung Care Ambassadors or Samsung Members Stars are invited to attend.

== History ==
The first Galaxy Unpacked event was held on 15 June 2009 in Singapore. From 2010 through 2019, the locations of Unpacked were held from Barcelona, Spain, Berlin, Germany, San Diego, USA, London, United Kingdom, New York City, USA, and San Francisco, USA.

In August 2020, due to the COVID-19 pandemic, Samsung held their event virtually for the first time to launch its Galaxy Note 20 series of devices and other devices like the Galaxy Z Fold 2, and Galaxy Tab S7. It was broadcast live, yet without the attendance of an audience, from the company's headquarters in Suwon, South Korea. The event garnered to over 56 million accumulated views.

Samsung hosted the Galaxy Unpacked event in San Francisco on February 1, 2023, returning to its previous format of inviting a live audience to attend for the first time since February 2020; the event announced the Galaxy S23 series and Galaxy Book 3 series.

The Galaxy Unpacked for Samsung's Galaxy Z Fold 5, Galaxy Z Flip 5, Galaxy Watch 6 series, and Galaxy Tab S9 series was held on July 26, 2023, at 12PM GMT (8PM KST) in Seoul, South Korea, where BTS member SUGA (Min Yoon-gi) made an appearance. His song Daechwita, released under his alternate pseudonym Agust D, was featured in the intro for the ceremony. This was the first Unpacked event to be held in Samsung's home country with a live audience in attendance.

The first Galaxy Unpacked for 2024 took place on January 17 at the SAP Center in San Jose, California, where Samsung announced their new generative Galaxy AI and the Galaxy S24 Series of mobile devices. They also officially introduced their Galaxy Ring device at the end of the event for a release date of July 2024. During the event, Pokimane made a special guest appearance showcasing AI features of the new phones.

3 virtual events were held in May, September and October 2025.

== List of Unpacked/Galaxy Unpacked Events ==
Year	Date	Location	Product launches	Ref.
2009	June 15	Singapore	Samsung S8000 Jet; Samsung i8000 Omnia II	
2010	February 14	Barcelona, Spain (MWC)	Samsung Wave S8500	
2010	March 23	Las Vegas, USA	Samsung Galaxy S	
2011	February 13	Barcelona, Spain (MWC)	Samsung Galaxy S II; Samsung Galaxy Tab 10.1	
2011	September 1	Berlin, Germany (IFA Berlin)	Samsung Galaxy Note; Samsung Galaxy Tab 7.7; Samsung Wave 3 S8600	
2011	October 10	San Diego, USA	Galaxy Nexus	
2012	May 3	London, United Kingdom	Samsung Galaxy S III	
2012	August 29	Berlin, Germany (IFA Berlin)	Samsung Galaxy Note II; Samsung Galaxy Camera; Samsung ATIV smart PC	
2013	March 14	New York City, USA	Samsung Galaxy S4	
2013	September 4	Berlin, Germany (IFA Berlin)	Samsung Galaxy Note 3 Samsung Galaxy Gear; Samsung Galaxy Note 10.1 2014 Edition	
2014	February 24	Barcelona, Spain (MWC)	Samsung Galaxy S5; Samsung Gear 2 Samsung Gear 2 Neo; Samsung Gear Fit	
2014	September 3	Berlin, Germany (IFA Berlin)	Samsung Galaxy Note 4 Samsung Galaxy Note Edge; Samsung Gear S Samsung Gear VR; Samsung Gear Circle	
2015	March 1	Barcelona, Spain (MWC)	Samsung Galaxy S6; Samsung Galaxy S6 Edge	
2015	August 13	New York City, USA	Samsung Galaxy S6 Edge+ Samsung Galaxy Note 5 Samsung Gear S2	
2016	February 21	Barcelona, Spain (MWC)	Samsung Galaxy S7; Samsung Galaxy S7 Edge; Samsung Gear 360	
2016	August 2	New York City, USA	Samsung Galaxy Note 7	
2017	March 29	New York City, USA	Samsung Galaxy S8; Samsung Galaxy S8+ Samsung Gear 360 (2017)	
2017	August 23	New York City, USA	Samsung Galaxy Note 8	
2018	February 25	Barcelona, Spain (MWC)	Samsung Galaxy S9; Samsung Galaxy S9+	
2018	August 9	New York City, USA	Samsung Galaxy Note 9 Samsung Galaxy Watch; Samsung Galaxy Home	
2018	October 11	Kuala Lumpur, Malaysia	Samsung Galaxy A7 (2018); Samsung Galaxy A9 (2018) (event known as Galaxy Event)	
2019	February 20	San Francisco, USA	Samsung Galaxy S10; Samsung Galaxy S10e; Samsung Galaxy S10+ Samsung Galaxy S10 5G; Samsung Galaxy Fold; Samsung Galaxy Watch Active; Samsung Galaxy Buds; Samsung Galaxy Fit; Samsung Galaxy Fit e Samsung Galaxy Tab S5e (after announcement)	
2019	April 10	Bangkok, Thailand	Samsung Galaxy A70; Samsung Galaxy A80 (event known as Galaxy Event)	
2019	August 7	New York City, USA	Samsung Galaxy Note 10; Samsung Galaxy Note 10+ Samsung Galaxy Watch Active 2 Samsung Galaxy Book S	
2020	February 11	San Francisco, USA	Samsung Galaxy S20; Samsung Galaxy S20+ Samsung Galaxy S20 Ultra; Samsung Galaxy Z Flip; Samsung Galaxy Buds+	
2020	August 5	Virtual Event	Samsung Galaxy Note 20; Samsung Galaxy Note 20 Ultra; Samsung Galaxy Buds Live; Samsung Galaxy Tab S7; Samsung Galaxy Tab S7+ Samsung Galaxy Watch 3 Samsung Galaxy Z Fold 2 (revealed)	
2020	September 1	Virtual Event	Samsung Galaxy Z Fold 2 (full details); Samsung Galaxy Fit 2	
2020	September 23	Virtual Event	Samsung Galaxy S20 FE	
2021	January 14	Virtual Event	Samsung Galaxy S21; Samsung Galaxy S21+ Samsung Galaxy S21 Ultra; Samsung Galaxy Buds Pro; Samsung Galaxy Smart Tag	
2021	March 17	Virtual Event	Samsung Galaxy A52; Samsung Galaxy A52 5G; Samsung Galaxy A72 (event known as Galaxy Awesome Unpacked)	
2021	April 28	Virtual Event	Samsung Galaxy Book (2021); Samsung Galaxy Book Pro; Samsung Galaxy Book Pro 360; Samsung Galaxy Book Odyssey	
2021	August 11	Virtual Event	Samsung Galaxy Z Fold 3 Samsung Galaxy Z Flip 3 Samsung Galaxy Watch 4 Samsung Galaxy Watch 4 Classic; Samsung Galaxy Buds 2	
2021	October 21	Virtual Event	Samsung Galaxy Z Flip 3 Bespoke Edition; Samsung Galaxy Watch 4 Maison Kitsuné Edition; Samsung Galaxy Buds 2 Maison Kitsuné Edition	
2022	February 9	Virtual Event	Samsung Galaxy S22; Samsung Galaxy S22+ Samsung Galaxy S22 Ultra; Samsung Galaxy Tab S8; Samsung Galaxy Tab S8+ Samsung Galaxy Tab S8 Ultra	
2022	March 17	Virtual Event	Samsung Galaxy A33 5G; Samsung Galaxy A53 5G (event known as Galaxy A Unpacked)	
2022	August 10	Virtual Event	Samsung Galaxy Z Fold 4 Samsung Galaxy Z Flip 4 Samsung Galaxy Watch 5 Samsung Galaxy Watch 5 Pro; Samsung Galaxy Buds 2 Pro	
2023	February 1	San Francisco, USA	Samsung Galaxy S23; Samsung Galaxy S23+ Samsung Galaxy S23 Ultra; Samsung Galaxy Book 3 Samsung Galaxy Book 3 360; Samsung Galaxy Book 3 Pro; Samsung Galaxy Book 3 Pro 360; Samsung Galaxy Book 3 Ultra	
2023	July 26	Seoul, South Korea	Samsung Galaxy Z Fold 5 Samsung Galaxy Z Flip 5 Samsung Galaxy Watch 6 Samsung Galaxy Watch 6 Classic; Samsung Galaxy Tab S9; Samsung Galaxy Tab S9+ Samsung Galaxy Tab S9 Ultra	
2023	October 3	Virtual Event	Samsung Galaxy S23 FE; Samsung Galaxy Tab S9 FE; Samsung Galaxy Tab S9 FE+ Samsung Galaxy Buds FE (event known as Galaxy Event)	
2024	January 17	San Jose, USA	Samsung Galaxy S24; Samsung Galaxy S24+ Samsung Galaxy S24 Ultra	
2024	July 10	Paris, France	Samsung Galaxy Z Fold 6 Samsung Galaxy Z Flip 6 Samsung Galaxy Watch 7 Samsung Galaxy Watch Ultra; Samsung Galaxy Buds 3 Samsung Galaxy Buds 3 Pro; Samsung Galaxy Ring	
2024	September 27	Virtual Event	Samsung Galaxy S24 FE; Samsung Galaxy Tab S10+ Samsung Galaxy Tab S10 Ultra (event known as Galaxy Event)	
2025	January 22	San Jose, USA	Samsung Galaxy S25; Samsung Galaxy S25+ Samsung Galaxy S25 Ultra; Samsung Galaxy S25 Edge (revealed); Samsung Galaxy XR (revealed as Project Moohan)	
2025	May 13	Virtual Event	Samsung Galaxy S25 Edge (full details)	
2025	July 9	Brooklyn, USA	Samsung Galaxy Z Fold 7 Samsung Galaxy Z Flip 7 Samsung Galaxy Z Flip 7 FE; Samsung Galaxy Watch 8 Samsung Galaxy Watch 8 Classic; Samsung Galaxy Watch Ultra (2025)	
2025	September 4	Virtual Event	Samsung Galaxy S25 FE; Samsung Galaxy Tab S11; Samsung Galaxy Tab S11 Ultra (event known as Galaxy Event)	
2025	October 21	Virtual Event	Samsung Galaxy XR (official launch) (event known as Galaxy Event)	
2026	February 25	San Francisco, USA	Samsung Galaxy S26; Samsung Galaxy S26+ Samsung Galaxy S26 Ultra; Samsung Galaxy Buds 4 Samsung Galaxy Buds 4 Pro	
2026	July 22	London, England	Samsung Galaxy Z Fold 8 Samsung Galaxy Z Fold 8 Ultra; Samsung Galaxy Z Flip 8 Samsung Galaxy Watch 9 Samsung Galaxy Watch Ultra 2 Samsung Galaxy Glasses	
2026	August 27	Virtual Event	Samsung Galaxy S26 FE	

== See also ==
- Samsung Developer Conference (SDC)
