= Samsung Galaxy Buds 3 =

2024 wireless earbuds by Samsung Electronics

Samsung Galaxy Buds 3 Samsung Galaxy Buds 3 Pro Samsung Galaxy Buds 3 FE
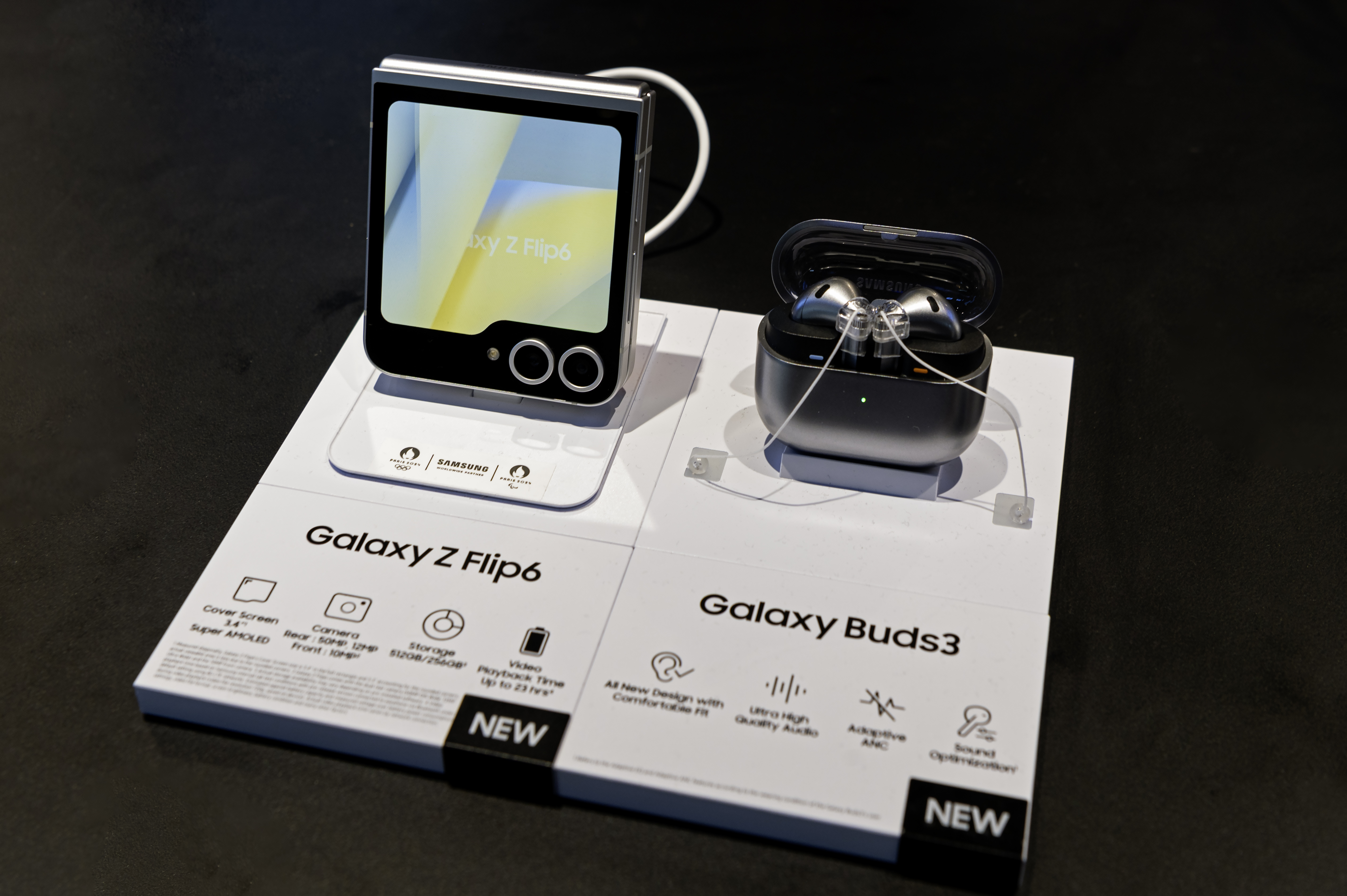
- Samsung Galaxy Buds 3 with Samsung Galaxy Z Flip 6
- Brand: Samsung
- Manufacturer: Samsung Electronics
- Type: Wireless earbuds
- Series: Galaxy Buds
- Family: Samsung Galaxy
- First released: Buds 3 & 3 Pro: July 24, 2024; 2 years ago Buds 3 FE: September 4, 2025; 11 months ago
- Predecessor: Samsung Galaxy Buds 2 Samsung Galaxy Buds FE
- Successor: Samsung Galaxy Buds 4
- Connectivity: Bluetooth 5.4
- Model: Buds 3: SM-R530; Buds 3 Pro: SM-R630; Buds 3 FE: SM-R420

The Samsung Galaxy Buds 3 is a series of wireless Bluetooth earbuds manufactured, developed and designed by Samsung Electronics, and the 3rd generation of the Galaxy Buds series. It was announced on July 10, 2024, at the Galaxy Unpacked event alongside the Galaxy Z Fold 6, the Galaxy Z Flip 6, the Galaxy Watch 7, the Galaxy Watch Ultra and the Galaxy Ring, and released on July 24, 2024, as the successor to the Galaxy Buds 2 lineup.

The Galaxy Buds 3 FE was announced on August 18, 2025, seen as the successor to the Buds FE. Positioned as an affordable alternative in the 3rd generation wireless lineup, the Buds 3 FE deliver features like active noise cancellation and Galaxy AI integration with a stem design. It was released on September 4, 2025, with a launch price of $149.99.
