= Samsung Galaxy Buds Live =

2020 wireless earbuds by Samsung Electronics

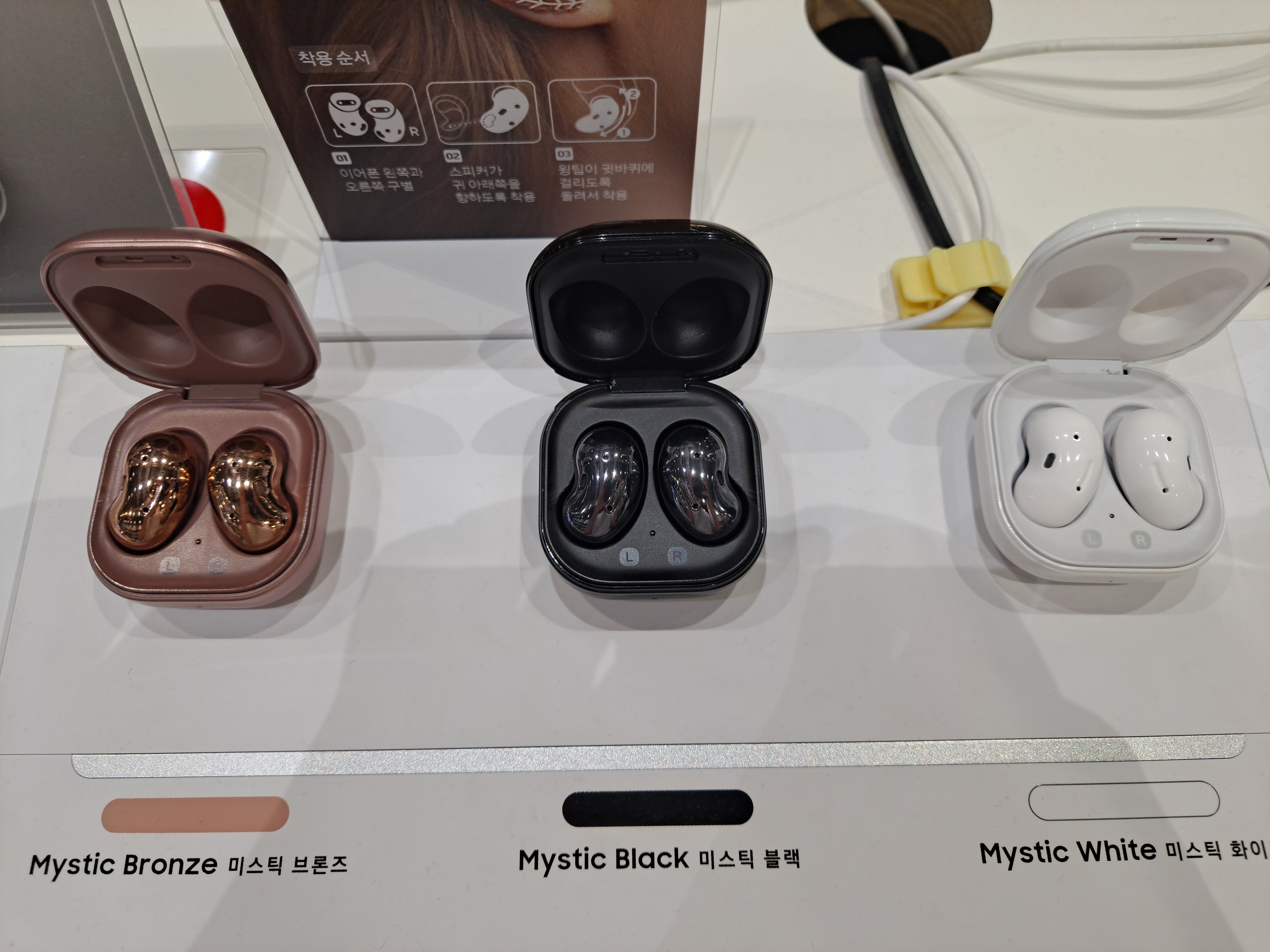
- Samsung Galaxy Buds Live all colors
- Brand: Samsung
- Manufacturer: Samsung Electronics
- Type: Wireless earbuds
- Series: Galaxy Buds
- Family: Samsung Galaxy
- First released: August 21, 2020; 6 years ago
- Availability by region: August 21, 2020; 6 years ago
- Discontinued: August 11, 2021; 5 years ago
- Successor: Samsung Galaxy Buds 2
- Related: Samsung Galaxy Buds
- Battery: Earbuds: 60 mAh; Case: 500 mAh
- Model: SM-R180
- Website: Galaxy Buds Live

The Samsung Galaxy Buds Live is a release of Bluetooth Wireless earbuds manufactured, developed and designed by Samsung Electronics for its Galaxy Buds series. It was officially announced on August 5, 2020 during a virtual Galaxy Unpacked event, alongside the Galaxy Note 20, the Galaxy Watch 3, the Galaxy Tab S7 and the Galaxy Z Fold 2, with a starting price of $169. It was released on August 21, 2020.

The Buds Live was notable for its "bean" like on-ear design, a departure from the previous in ear design used in the Buds lineup. The Buds Live was the first Galaxy Buds device to launch with active noise cancellation. It was praised for its design, but criticized for the ineffective active noise cancellation. Product review site, 'BestReviews' wrote "Unlike the rest of the Galaxy Buds lineup, the bean-shaped Galaxy Buds Live is on-ear buds that rest just outside the ear canal. People who have trouble with in-ear buds may find the Buds Live more to its liking. We found when we tested a pair of Buds Live that it ultimately felts more secure than competing earbuds after a short adjustment period."

== Features ==
The Galaxy Buds Live feature active noise cancellation, a bean shape and a wingtip design. Black, white, and Mystic Bronze are the available colour variations for the earbuds. The earbuds measure 2.8 cm longitudinally and 1.3 cm wide whilst the charging case is 2.6 cm thick. The lower part of the buds fit directly inside the ear canal whilst the back fills the upper part of the ear.
