= Samsung Galaxy Buds 2 =

2021 wireless earbuds by Samsung Electronics

Samsung Galaxy Buds 2 Samsung Galaxy Buds 2 Pro
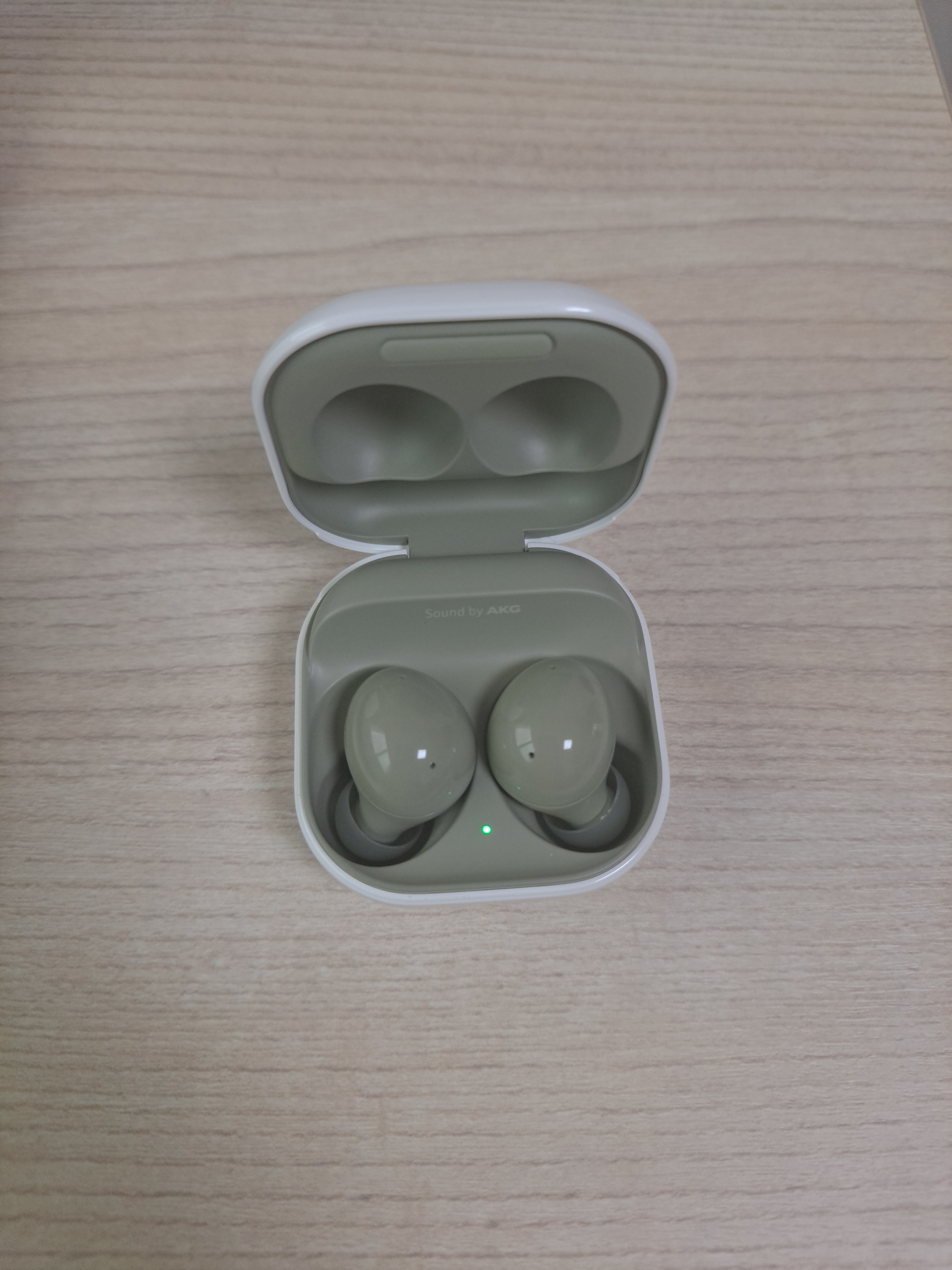
- Samsung Galaxy Buds 2
- Brand: Samsung
- Manufacturer: Samsung Electronics
- Type: Wireless earbuds
- Series: Galaxy Buds
- Family: Samsung Galaxy
- First released: Buds 2: August 11, 2021; 5 years ago Buds 2 Pro: August 10, 2022; 4 years ago
- Availability by region: Buds 2: August 27, 2021; 5 years ago Buds 2 Pro: August 26, 2022; 4 years ago
- Discontinued: July 10, 2024; 2 years ago
- Predecessor: Samsung Galaxy Buds; Samsung Galaxy Buds Plus; Samsung Galaxy Buds Pro
- Successor: Samsung Galaxy Buds 3
- Related: Samsung Galaxy Buds Live
- Model: Buds 2: SM-R177; Buds 2 Pro: SM-R510

The Samsung Galaxy Buds 2 (stylized as Samsung Galaxy Buds2) is a series of wireless earbuds manufactured, developed, designed and marketed by Samsung Electronics. It was announced on August 11, 2021 and released on August 27, 2021 at the Samsung's Galaxy Unpacked event alongside the Galaxy Z Fold 3, the Galaxy Z Flip 3 and the Galaxy Watch 4, while its Pro model was announced on August 10, 2022 and released on August 26, 2022 at the same event alongside the Galaxy Z Fold 4, the Galaxy Z Flip 4 and the Galaxy Watch 5.

The Buds 2 was the successor to the original Galaxy Buds and the Galaxy Buds Plus, which were discontinued following the announcement. It costs less than its predecessor, and was praised for their all around performance for the price.

The Buds 2 Pro includes active noise cancellation, 24-bit Hi-Fi audio support (only for Samsung device with One UI 4.0 or above) and enhanced 360-degree audio. It was the successor to the Galaxy Buds Pro, which were discontinued following the announcement.

== Specifications ==
Product	Galaxy Buds 2	Galaxy Buds 2 Pro
Earbuds size	17.0 x 20.9 x 21.1 mm	21.6 × 19.9 × 18.7 mm
Earbuds weight	5g	5.5 g
Case size	50 x 50.2 x 27.8 mm	50 × 50 × 28 mm
Case weight	41.2g	43.3 g
Network	Bluetooth 5.2	Bluetooth 5.3
Sensors	Accelerometer, Hall sensor, Proximity sensor, Touch sensor	Accelerometer, Gyroscope, Hall sensor, Proximity sensor, Touch sensor, Voice Pickup Unit
Battery	Earbuds: Li-Ion 61 mAh; Case: Li-Ion 472 mAh	Earbuds: Li-Ion 58 mAh; Case: Li-Ion 500 mAh
Charging	Wireless charging (WPC's magnetic induction method)	
