= Samsung Galaxy Buds =

2019 wireless earbuds by Samsung Electronics

Samsung Galaxy Buds Samsung Galaxy Buds Plus Samsung Galaxy Buds Pro Samsung Galaxy Buds FE

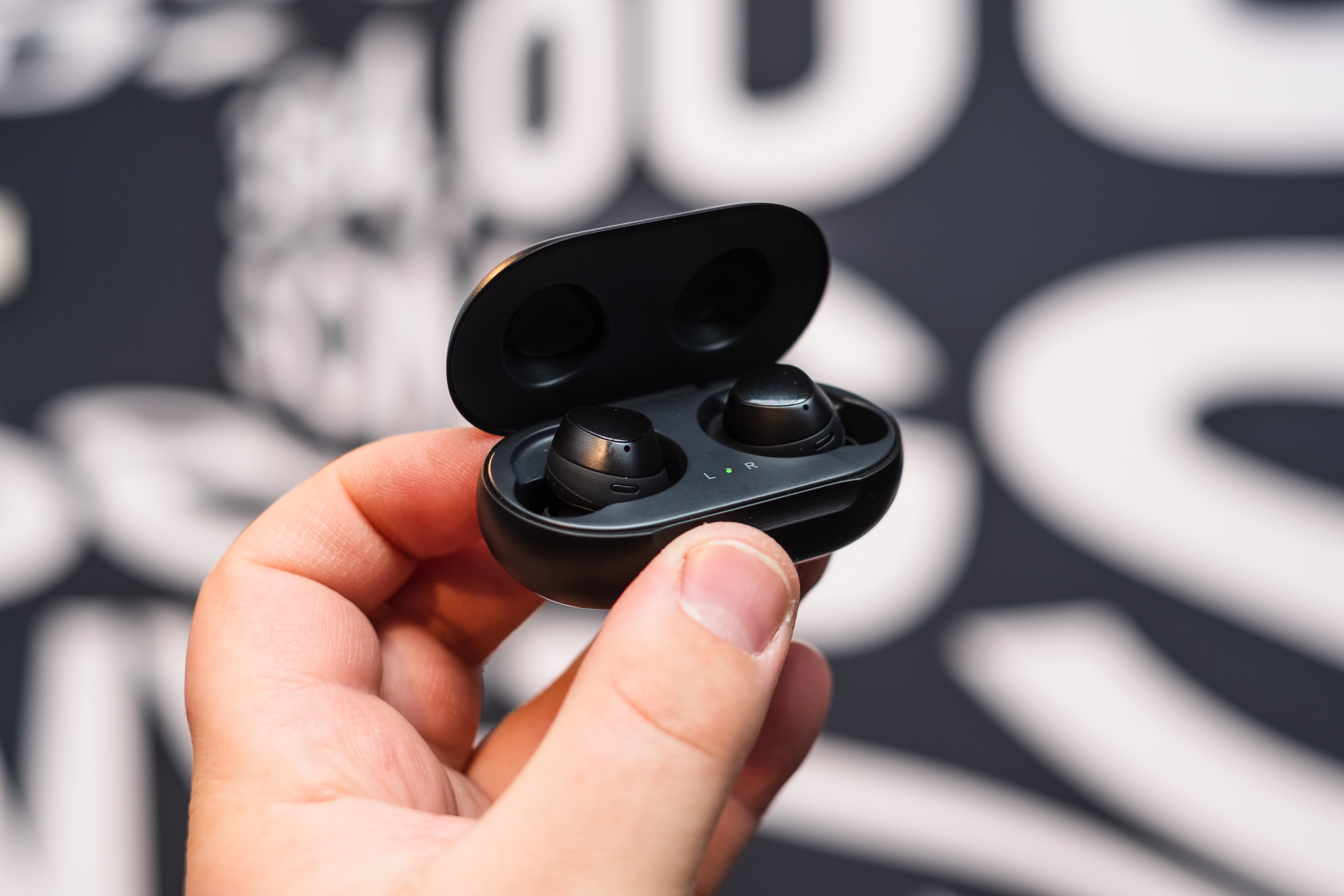
- Samsung Galaxy Buds
- Brand: Samsung
- Manufacturer: Samsung Electronics
- Type: Wireless earbuds
- Series: Galaxy Buds
- Family: Samsung Galaxy
- First released: Buds: March 8, 2019; 7 years ago Buds Plus: February 11, 2020; 6 years ago Buds Pro: January 14, 2021; 5 years ago Buds FE: October 5, 2023; 2 years ago
- Discontinued: Buds: February 11, 2020; 6 years ago Buds Plus: January 14, 2021; 5 years ago Buds Pro: August 10, 2022; 4 years ago Buds FE: August 18, 2025; 13 months ago
- Predecessor: Samsung Gear IconX
- Successor: Samsung Galaxy Buds Live; Samsung Galaxy Buds 2 Samsung Galaxy Buds 3 FE
- Model: Buds: SM-R170; Buds+: SM-R175; Buds Pro: SM-R190

Samsung Galaxy Buds is a release of wireless earphones manufactured, developed, designed and produced by Samsung Electronics, and the 1st generation of the Galaxy Buds series. It serves as the successor to the Gear IconX. It was announced on February 20, 2019, and released on March 8, 2019, at the Samsung's Galaxy Unpacked event, alongside the Galaxy S10 series, the Galaxy Fold, the Galaxy Watch Active and the Galaxy Fit/Fit e.

== Models ==
=== Galaxy Buds ===
The original Galaxy Buds (SM-R170) was launched on March 8, 2019. The launch price was $129.99, and included a wireless charging case. The Buds was discontinued when the Buds Plus was released.

=== Galaxy Buds Plus ===
The Galaxy Buds Plus (SM-R175) was announced on February 11, 2020, at the spring Galaxy Unpacked event. The Buds Plus was released on February 14, priced at $149.99, a $20 price increase from the original Buds. The Buds Plus maintained the same design as the original Buds, but reviewers praised the improved sound and microphone quality and significantly increased battery life. Additionally, a second driver for bass was included to enhance audio quality at lower frequencies.

=== Galaxy Buds Pro ===
The Galaxy Buds Pro (SM-R190) was announced on January 14, 2021, and launched the following day, on January 15. The Buds Pro improved upon the design of the Galaxy Buds Plus and included improved audio, head tracking technology, and active noise cancellation. They were praised for their improved design and sound quality, but criticized for their 5-hour battery life when active noise cancellation is on.

=== Galaxy Buds FE ===
The Galaxy Buds FE, short for "Fan Edition", was released on October 5, 2023 for US$100, marketed as an affordable alternative to the other Galaxy Buds models. Its specifications include a 30-hour battery life with active noise cancellation disabled and the charging case and an IPX2 water resistance rating, as opposed to the 2 Pro's IPX7.

== Specifications ==
Samsung Galaxy Buds
Product	Galaxy Buds (Bluetooth®)
Earbud Dimensions	19.2 x 17.5 x 22.5(mm)
Earbud Weight	6g
Case Dimensions	26.5 x 70.0 x 38.8(mm)
Weight	40g
Network	Bluetooth 5.0
Sensors	Accelerometer, Proximity Sensor, Hall Sensor
Battery	252 mAh Lithium-ion battery
Charging	Wireless Charging (WPC magnetic induction)

== See also ==
- Samsung Electronics
- Samsung Galaxy
- Samsung Gear IconX
- Samsung Galaxy Buds series

Preceded by Samsung Gear IconX; Samsung Gear IconX 2018	Samsung Galaxy Buds; 2019	Succeeded by Samsung Galaxy Buds 2
Preceded by ---	Samsung Galaxy Buds Plus; 2020	Succeeded by Samsung Galaxy Buds 2 Pro
Preceded by ---	Samsung Galaxy Buds Pro; 2021	Succeeded by Samsung Galaxy Buds 2 Pro
Preceded by ---	Samsung Galaxy Buds FE; 2023	Succeeded by Samsung Galaxy Buds 3 FE
