= Samsung Galaxy Watch =

2018 Tizen smartwatch by Samsung Electronics

Samsung Galaxy Watch (SM-R800/R810)

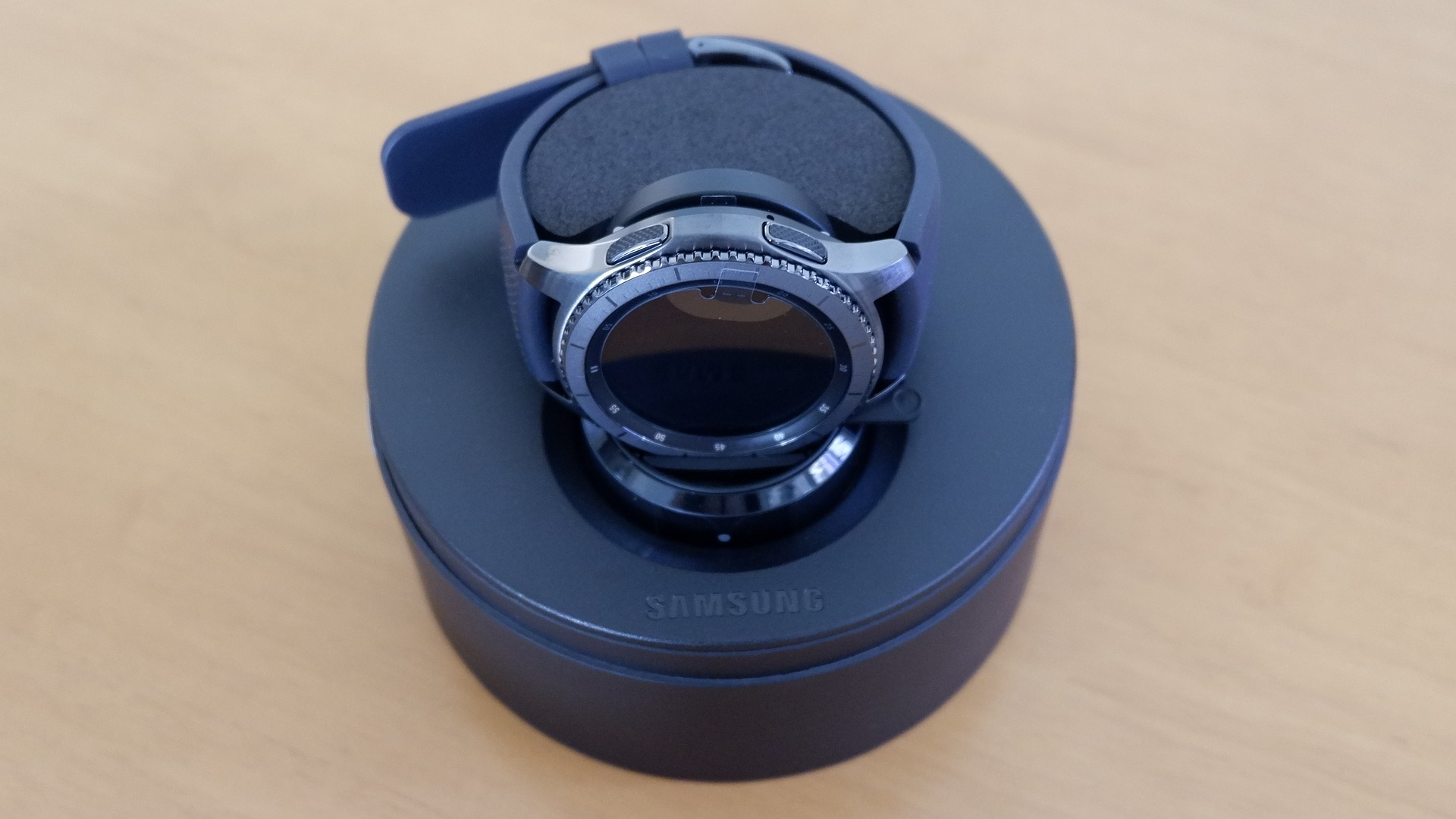
- Brand: Samsung
- Manufacturer: Samsung Electronics
- Type: Smartwatch
- Series: Galaxy Watch
- Family: Samsung Galaxy
- First released: August 24, 2018; 8 years ago (US)
- Discontinued: August 5, 2020; 6 years ago
- Predecessor: Samsung Gear S3; Samsung Gear Sport
- Successor: Samsung Galaxy Watch 3
- Related: Samsung Galaxy Watch Active
- Operating system: Tizen 4.0
- Water resistance: IP68
- Website: Official website

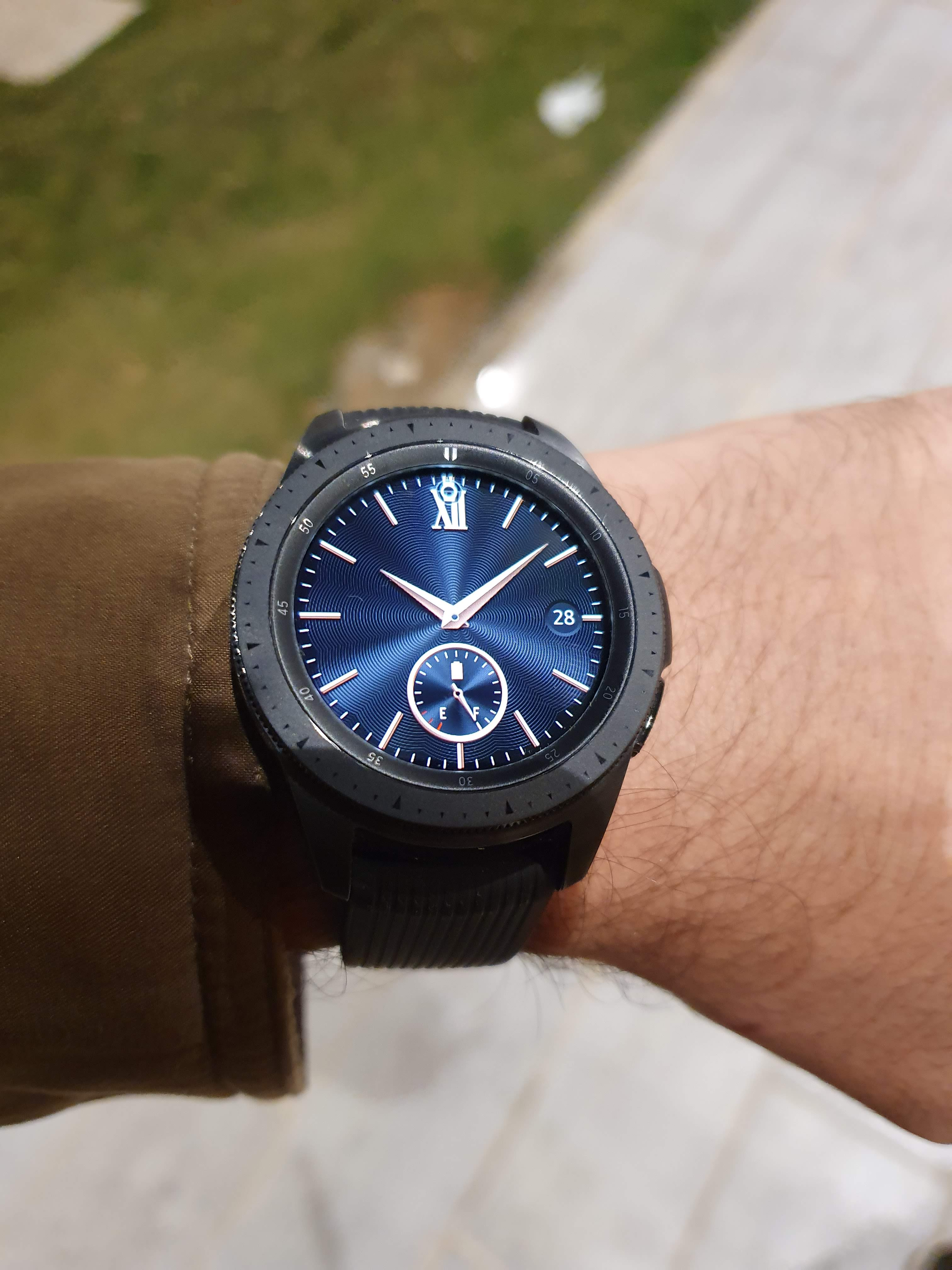
A black Galaxy Watch

The Samsung Galaxy Watch is a smartwatch developed by Samsung Electronics. It was announced on August 9, 2018. The Galaxy Watch was scheduled for availability in the United States starting on August 24, 2018, at select carriers and retail locations in South Korea on August 31, 2018, and in additional select markets on September 14, 2018.

On February 27, 2021, Shortly after the Galaxy Watch Active 2 and Watch 3 received an update unlocking the ECG feature for the European countries, Samsung is now delivering Galaxy Watch3-intrinsic features to the original Galaxy Watch and Watch Active.

== Specifications ==
Model	Galaxy Watch		Ref.
Size	42 mm	46 mm	
Part No.	SM-R815	SM-R805	
Colors	Midnight Black, Rose Gold	Silver	
Display	1.2" (30 mm)	1.3" (33 mm)	
Resolution	360 x 360 pixels		
Glass	Corning Gorilla Glass DX+		
Processor	Exynos 9110 dual core 1.15 GHz		
Operating System	Tizen (OS 4.0)		
Size	45.7 x 41.9 x 12.7 mm (1.80 x 1.65 x 0.5 in)	49 x 46 x 13 mm (1.93 x 1.81 x 0.51 in)	
Weight (without strap)	49 g (1.73 oz)	63 g (2.22 oz)	
Strap Size	20 mm	22 mm	
Water Resistance	5 ATM + IP68		
Memory	LTE version: 1.5 GiB RAM + 4 GiB flash memory		
Memory	Bluetooth version: 768 MiB RAM + 4 GiB flash memory		
Connectivity	3G/LTE with eSIM (Galaxy Watch LTE-Version only); Bluetooth 4.2; Wi-Fi b/g/n; NFC; A-GPS, GLONASS		
Sensors	MEMS Accelerometer; MEMS Gyroscope; MEMS Barometer; Electro-optical sensor (for heart rate monitoring); Photodetector (for ambient light)		
Battery	270 mAh (up to 4 days)	472 mAh (up to 7 days)	
