= Samsung Galaxy Watch 4 =

2021 smartwatch by Samsung Electronics

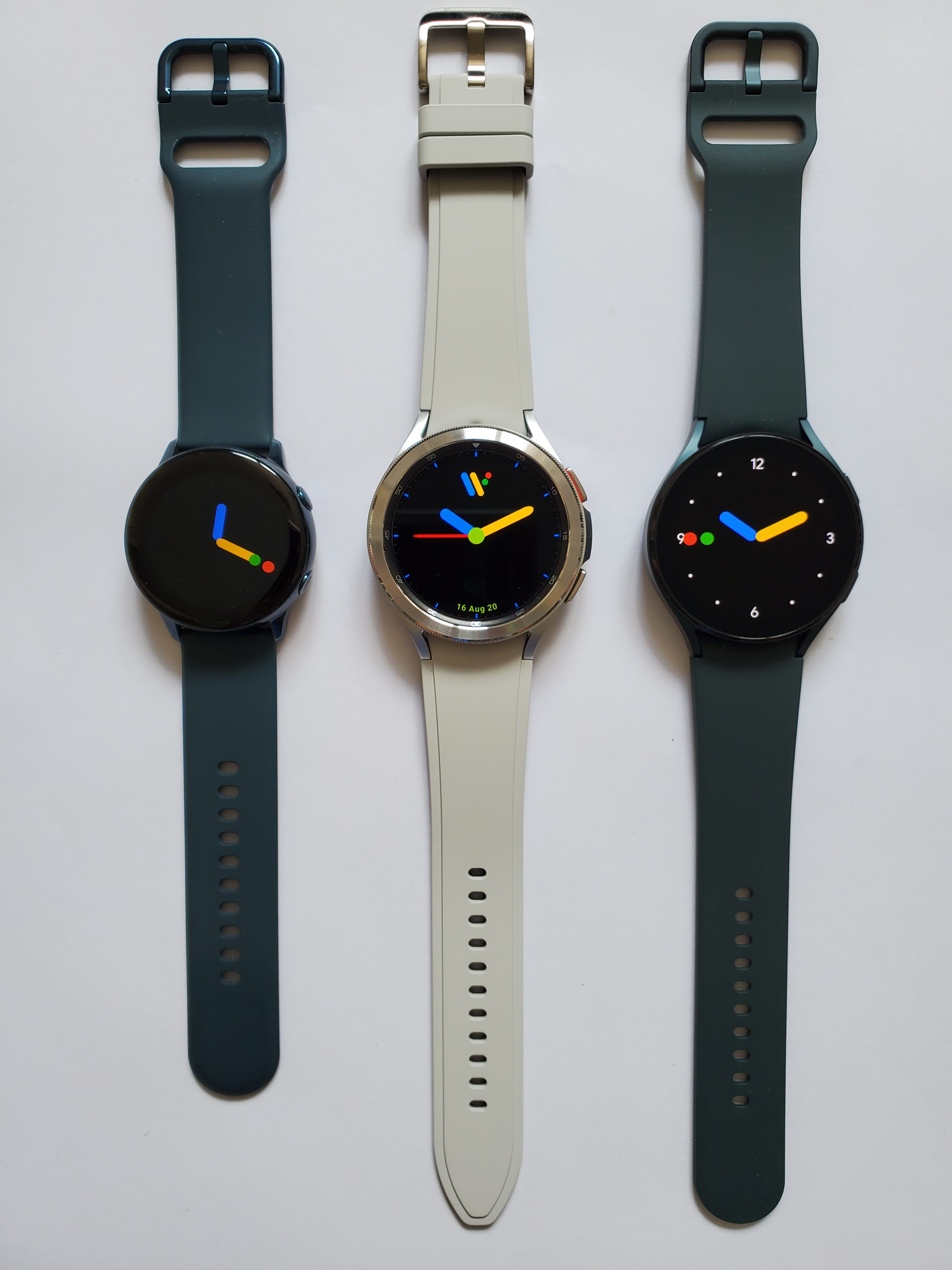
- From left to right: Watch Active 2, 46mm Watch 4 Classic and Watch 4
- Brand: Samsung
- Manufacturer: Samsung Electronics
- Type: Smartwatch
- Series: Galaxy Watch
- Family: Samsung Galaxy
- First released: August 27, 2021; 5 years ago
- Availability by region: August 27, 2021; 5 years ago
- Discontinued: August 10, 2022; 4 years ago
- Predecessor: Samsung Galaxy Watch Active 2 Samsung Galaxy Watch 3
- Successor: Samsung Galaxy Watch 5
- Related: Samsung Galaxy Watch FE
- Compatible networks: Cellular: 3G, 4G
- Operating system: Original: Wear OS 3.0 with One UI Watch 3.0; Current: Wear OS 6.0 with One UI Watch 8.0
- System-on-chip: Exynos W920 (5 nm) System-in-Package
- CPU: Dual-core 1.18GHz Cortex-A55
- GPU: 667MHz Mali-G68 MP2
- Memory: 1.5 GB LPDDR4X RAM
- Storage: 16 GB eMMC 5.1
- Battery: Non-removable Li-Ion; 247mAh (40 mm); 361mAh (44 mm)
- Charging: Wireless up to 10W
- Display: 1.19 in (30 mm) RGB stripe Super AMOLED capacitive display, 396×396 pixels, 16 M colours, ~330 ppi, 1:1 aspect ratio 1.36 in (35 mm) RGB stripe Super AMOLED capacitive display, 450×450 pixels, 16 M colours, ~327 ppi, 1:1 aspect ratio Digital touch bezel or physical rotating bezel (Classic); Glass front (Gorilla Glass DX+) (Galaxy Watch 4) (Gorilla Glass DX+) (Galaxy Watch 4 Classic)
- External display: Always On Display
- Data inputs: Heart rate monitor Bioelectrical Impedance Analysis; Accelerometer; Gyroscope; Barometer; Natural language commands & dictation
- Model: SM-R860, SM-R870, SM-R880, SM-R890 (Wi-Fi only), SM-R865U, SM-R875U, SM-R885U, SM-R895U (USA, LTE model)
- Codename: Fresh
- Website: Galaxy Watch 4

The Samsung Galaxy Watch 4 (stylized as Samsung Galaxy Watch4) is a smartwatch manufactured, developed, designed and marketed by Samsung Electronics. It was announced on August 11, 2021, at Samsung's Galaxy Unpacked event alongside the Galaxy Z Fold 3, Galaxy Z Flip 3 and Galaxy Buds 2, and was released worldwide on August 27, 2021.

The Galaxy Watch 4 is the first Samsung watch to run Google's Wear OS since the Gear Live, and the first watch to run Wear OS 3, co-developed by Samsung and Google. The device largely followed the design language of the preceding Galaxy Watch Active 2 and Galaxy Watch 3, but including all new software. The watch also included EKG, body compositional analysis, and blood pressure monitoring via the Samsung BioActive sensor.

The Galaxy Watch 4 was succeeded by the Galaxy Watch 5 on August 10, 2022, and had the FE-based model on June 13, 2024.

== Specifications ==
Model	Galaxy Watch 4		Galaxy Watch 4 Classic		Ref.
Size	40 mm	44 mm	42 mm	46 mm	
Part no.	SM-R860 (Wi-Fi) SM-R865 (LTE)	SM-R870 (Wi-Fi) SM-R875 (LTE)	SM-R880 (Wi-Fi) SM-R885 (LTE)	SM-R890 (Wi-Fi) SM-R895 (LTE)	
Colors	Black, green, pink gold, silver	Black, green, silver	Black, silver		
Display	1.2" (30.4 mm)	1.4" (35.6 mm)	1.2" (30.4 mm)	1.4" (35.6 mm)	
Resolution	396 x 396 pixels	450 x 450 pixels	396 x 396 pixels	450 x 450 pixels	
Glass	Corning Gorilla Glass DX+		Corning Gorilla Glass DX		
Chassis	Aluminum		Stainless steel		
Processor	Exynos W920 dual-core 1.18 GHz Cortex-A55				
Operating system	Wear OS 3.0 (upgradable to 6.0)				
UI	One UI Watch 3.0 (upgradable to 8.0)				
Size (excluding health sensor)	40.4 x 39.3 x 9.8 mm (1.59 x 1.55 x 0.39 in)	44.4 x 43.3 x 9.8 mm (1.75 x 1.70 x 0.39 in)	41.5 x 41.5 x 11.2 mm (1.63 x 1.63 x 0.44 in)	45.5 x 45.5 x 11 mm (1.79 x 1.79 x 0.43 in)	
Weight (without strap)	25.9 g (0.92 oz)	30.3 g (1.06 oz)	46.5 g (1.62 oz)	52 g (1.83 oz)	
Strap size	20 mm				
Water resistance	5ATM + IP68 / MIL-STD-810G				
Memory	1.5 GB RAM + 16 GB flash memory				
Connectivity	4G/LTE with eSIM (LTE models only); Bluetooth 5.0; Wi-Fi a/b/g/n 2.4+5 GHz; NFC; A-GPS, GLONASS, Beidou, Galileo				
Sensors	Heart rate monitor Blood oxygen monitor Electrocardiography (ECG); Blood pressure monitor Bioelectrical impedance analysis Accelerometer; Barometer; Gyro sensor Geomagnetic sensor Light sensor				
Battery	247 mAh	361 mAh	247 mAh	361 mAh	

== Software ==
The smartwatch was the first watch released by Samsung to use Wear OS instead of Samsung's own Tizen OS.

This smartwatch is region locked in mainland China, unlike past models.

== Supported languages and regions ==
Unlike past Wear OS devices, Wear OS 3 supports a wider variety of languages that the end user can choose from. An ADB command can be used to temporarily change the watch's language to another one, which will reset when the device is reconnected to the phone.

Depending on the region where the device was sold from (thus depending on the CSC code), the language and region options may differ.

== See also ==
- Samsung Galaxy S21
- Samsung Galaxy Book Pro
- Samsung Galaxy Z Fold 3
- Samsung Galaxy Z Flip 3
- Samsung Galaxy Buds 2
