= Samsung Galaxy Ring =

2024 smart ring by Samsung Electronics

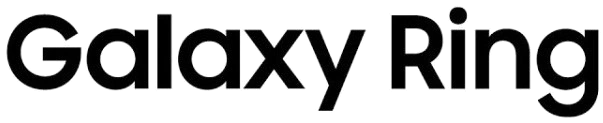

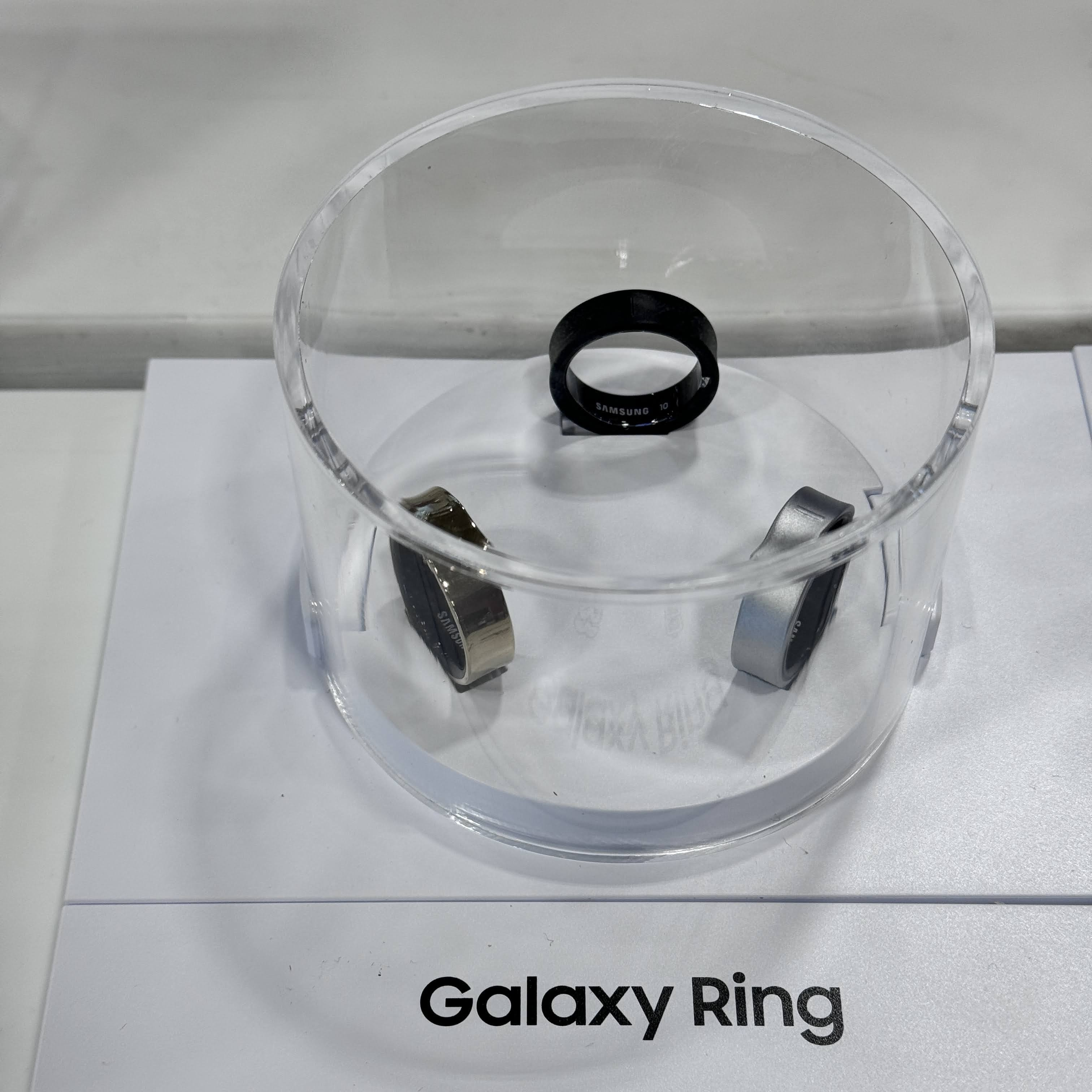
- Brand: Samsung
- Manufacturer: Samsung Electronics
- Type: Smart ring
- Family: Samsung Galaxy
- First released: July 10, 2024; 2 years ago
- Availability by region: July 10, 2024; 2 years ago
- Related: Samsung Galaxy Watch series Samsung Galaxy Fit series Samsung Galaxy Buds series
- Colors: Titanium Black, Titanium Silver, Titanium Gold
- Dimensions: 7.0 x 2.6 mm
- Weight: 2.3 to 3.0 g
- Memory: 8 MB RAM
- Battery: 18-23.5 mAh
- Connectivity: BLE 5.4
- Water resistance: IP68

The Samsung Galaxy Ring is a smart ring manufactured and developed by Samsung Electronics. It was announced and released on July 10, 2024, alongside the Galaxy Z Fold 6, the Galaxy Z Flip 6, the Galaxy Watch 7, the Galaxy Watch Ultra and the Galaxy Buds 3, at the Galaxy Unpacked. It is Samsung's first smart ring with biometric health monitoring. The ring launched with a price of $399.99.

== Specifications ==
=== Hardware ===
The Samsung Galaxy Ring is 7.0mm by 2.6 mm in dimensions and weighs between 2.3 and 3 grams, depending on ring size. The ring has 8 MB of RAM and a battery between 18 and 23.5mAh (depending on ring size) which lasts up to 7 days. The ring is equipped with an accelerometer, PPG and skin temperature sensors. The ring uses BLE 5.4 connectivity. The ring has been IP68 and 10ATM rated. It is compatible with Android phones operated by Android 11 or above and have Samsung Health app installed. The ring comes with three color variations which are Titanium Black, Titanium Silver, Titanium Gold.

== See also ==
- Oura Ring
