= Samsung Galaxy Watch Active =

2019 Smartwatch by Samsung Electronics

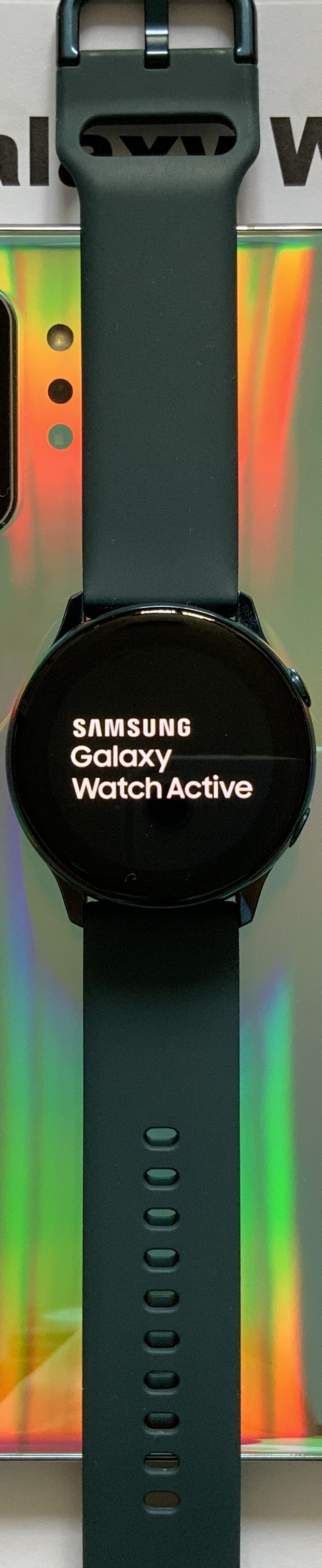
- A Samsung Galaxy Watch Active
- Brand: Samsung
- Manufacturer: Samsung Electronics
- Type: Smartwatch
- Series: Galaxy Watch
- Family: Samsung Galaxy
- First released: March 8, 2019; 7 years ago
- Availability by region: March 8, 2019; 7 years ago
- Discontinued: August 7, 2019; 7 years ago
- Predecessor: Samsung Gear S3 Frontier; Samsung Gear Sport
- Successor: Samsung Galaxy Watch Active 2
- Related: Samsung Galaxy Watch
- Compatible networks: 2G, 3G
- Colors: Black, Silver, Rose Gold, Sea Green
- Dimensions: 39.5 × 39.5 × 10.5 mm (1.56 × 1.56 × 0.41 in)
- Weight: 25 g (0.88 oz)
- Operating system: Original: Tizen 4.0.0.3 with One UI Watch 1.0; Current: Tizen 5.5.0.2 with One UI Watch 2.0
- Battery: 230 mAh (up to 3 days)
- Connectivity: Bluetooth 4.2, Wi-Fi 4 b/g/n, NFC, A-GPS, GLONASS, Beidou, Galileo
- Water resistance: IP68
- Model: SM-R500
- Website: Official website

The Samsung Galaxy Watch Active is a smartwatch manufactured, developed and developed by Samsung Electronics. It was announced on February 20, 2019 at the Samsung's Galaxy Unpacked event, alongside the Galaxy S10 series, the Galaxy Fold, the Galaxy Fit/Fit e and the Galaxy Buds. The Galaxy Watch Active was scheduled for availability in the United States starting on March 8, 2019.

== Specifications ==
Model	Galaxy Watch Active
Size	40 mm
Colors	Black, Silver, Rose Gold, Sea Green
Display	1.1" (28 mm)
Resolution	360 x 360 pixels
Part No.	SM-R500
Glass	Corning Gorilla Glass DX+
Processor	Exynos 9110 dual core 1.15 GHz
Operating System	Tizen (OS 4.0)
Size	39.5 x 39.5 x 10.5 mm (1.56 x 1.56 x 0.41 in)
Weight (without strap)	25 g (0.88 oz)
Strap Size	20 mm
Water Resistance	5 ATM + IP68
Memory	768 MiB RAM + 4 GiB flash memory
Connectivity	Bluetooth 4.2; Wi-Fi b/g/n; NFC; A-GPS, GLONASS, Beidou, Galileo
Sensors	MEMS Accelerometer; MEMS Gyroscope; MEMS Barometer; Electro-optical sensor (for heart rate monitoring); Photodetector (for ambient light)
Battery	230 mAh (up to 3 days)
