= Samsung Galaxy Watch 5 =

2022 smartwatches by Samsung Electronics

Samsung Galaxy Watch 5 Samsung Galaxy Watch 5 Pro
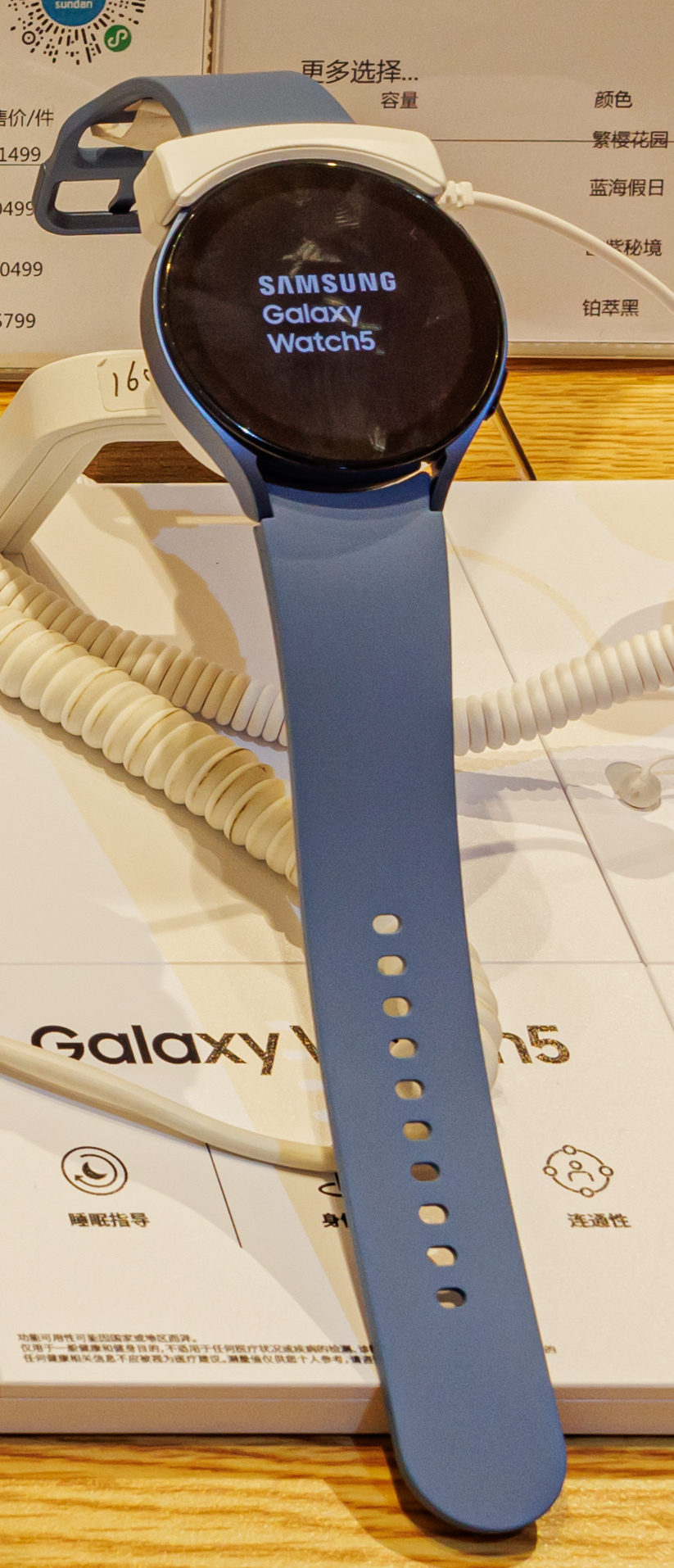
- A Samsung Galaxy Watch 5
- Brand: Samsung
- Manufacturer: Samsung Electronics
- Type: Smart Watch
- Series: Galaxy Watch
- Family: Samsung Galaxy
- First released: August 10, 2022; 4 years ago
- Availability by region: August 26, 2022; 4 years ago
- Discontinued: July 26, 2023; 3 years ago
- Predecessor: Samsung Galaxy Watch 4
- Successor: Samsung Galaxy Watch 6
- Compatible networks: 3G / 4G
- Colors: Graphite, Silver, Pink Gold, Sapphire
- Dimensions: (40 mm) 40.4 mm (1.59 in) H 39.3 mm (1.55 in) W 9.8 mm (0.39 in) D; (44 mm) 44.4 mm (1.75 in) H 43.3 mm (1.70 in) W 9.8 mm (0.39 in) D
- Weight: 28.7 g (1.01 oz) (40 mm); 33.5 g (1.18 oz) (44 mm)
- Operating system: Original: Wear OS 4.5 with One UI Watch 4 Current: Wear OS 6 with One UI Watch 8
- System-on-chip: Exynos W920 (5 nm)
- CPU: Dual-core 1.18 GHz Cortex-A55
- GPU: Mali-G68 MP2
- Memory: 1.5 GB RAM
- Storage: 16 GB
- SIM: eSIM
- Battery: Non-removable Li-Ion; 284 mAh (40 mm); 410 mAh (44 mm); 590 mAh (Pro)
- Charging: Wireless up to 10W
- Display: 1.19 in (30 mm) RGB stripe AMOLED 396 x 396p (~330 ppi); 1.36 in (35 mm) RGB stripe AMOLED 450 x 450p (~327 ppi)
- External display: Always on
- Connectivity: Wi-Fi 802.11 a/b/g/n, dual-band Bluetooth 5.2, A2DP, LE
- Data inputs: Accelerometer; Gyroscope; Heart rate monitor Barometer
- Website: Galaxy Watch 5

The Samsung Galaxy Watch 5 (stylized as Samsung Galaxy Watch5) is a series of Wear OS-based smartwatches manufactured, developed and designed by Samsung Electronics. It was announced on August 10, 2022, and released on August 26, 2022 at the Samsung's Galaxy Unpacked event, alongside the Galaxy Z Fold 4, Galaxy Z Flip 4 and Galaxy Buds 2 Pro.

== Specifications ==
Model	Galaxy Watch 5		Galaxy Watch 5 Pro	Ref.
Size	40 mm	44 mm	45 mm	
Model numbers	SM-R900 (Wi-Fi) SM-R905 (LTE)	SM-R910 (Wi-Fi) SM-R915 (LTE)	SM-R920 (Wi-Fi) SM-R925 (LTE)	
Colors	Graphite, Silver, Pink-Gold	Graphite, Silver, Sapphire	Black Titanium, Gray Titanium	
Display	1.2" (30.4 mm)	1.4" (34.6 mm)		
Resolution	396 x 396 pixels	450 x 450 pixels		
Glass	Sapphire crystal			
Chassis	Aluminum		Titanium	
Processor	Exynos W920 dual-core 1.18 GHz Cortex-A55			
Operating system	Wear OS 3.5 (upgradable to 6.0)			
User interface	One UI Watch 4.5 (upgradable to 8.0)			
Size (excluding the health sensor)	40.4 x 39.3 x 9.8 mm (1.59 x 1.55 x 0.39 in)	44.4 x 43.3 x 9.8 mm (1.75 x 1.70 x 0.39 in)	45.4 x 45.4 x 10.5 mm (1.79 x 1.79 x 0.41 in)	
Weight (without strap)	28.7 g (1.02 oz)	33.5 g (1.20 oz)	46.5 g (1.66 oz)	
Strap size	20 mm			
Water resistance	5ATM + IP68 / MIL-STD-810H			
Memory	1.5 GB RAM + 16 GB flash memory			
Connectivity	4G/LTE with eSIM (LTE models only); Bluetooth 5.2; Wi-Fi a/b/g/n 2.4+5 GHz; NFC; A-GPS, GLONASS, Beidou, Galileo			
Sensors	Heart rate monitor; Blood oxygen monitor; Electrocardiography (ECG); Blood pressure monitor; Bioelectrical Impedance Analysis (BIA); Temperature sensor; Accelerometer; Barometer; Gyro sensor; Geomagnetic sensor; Light sensor			
Battery	284 mAh	410 mAh	590 mAh	
