= Samsung Galaxy Book Pro =

2021 notebook computer by Samsung Electronics

Samsung Galaxy Book Pro Samsung Galaxy Book Pro 360
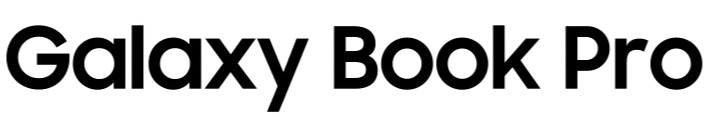

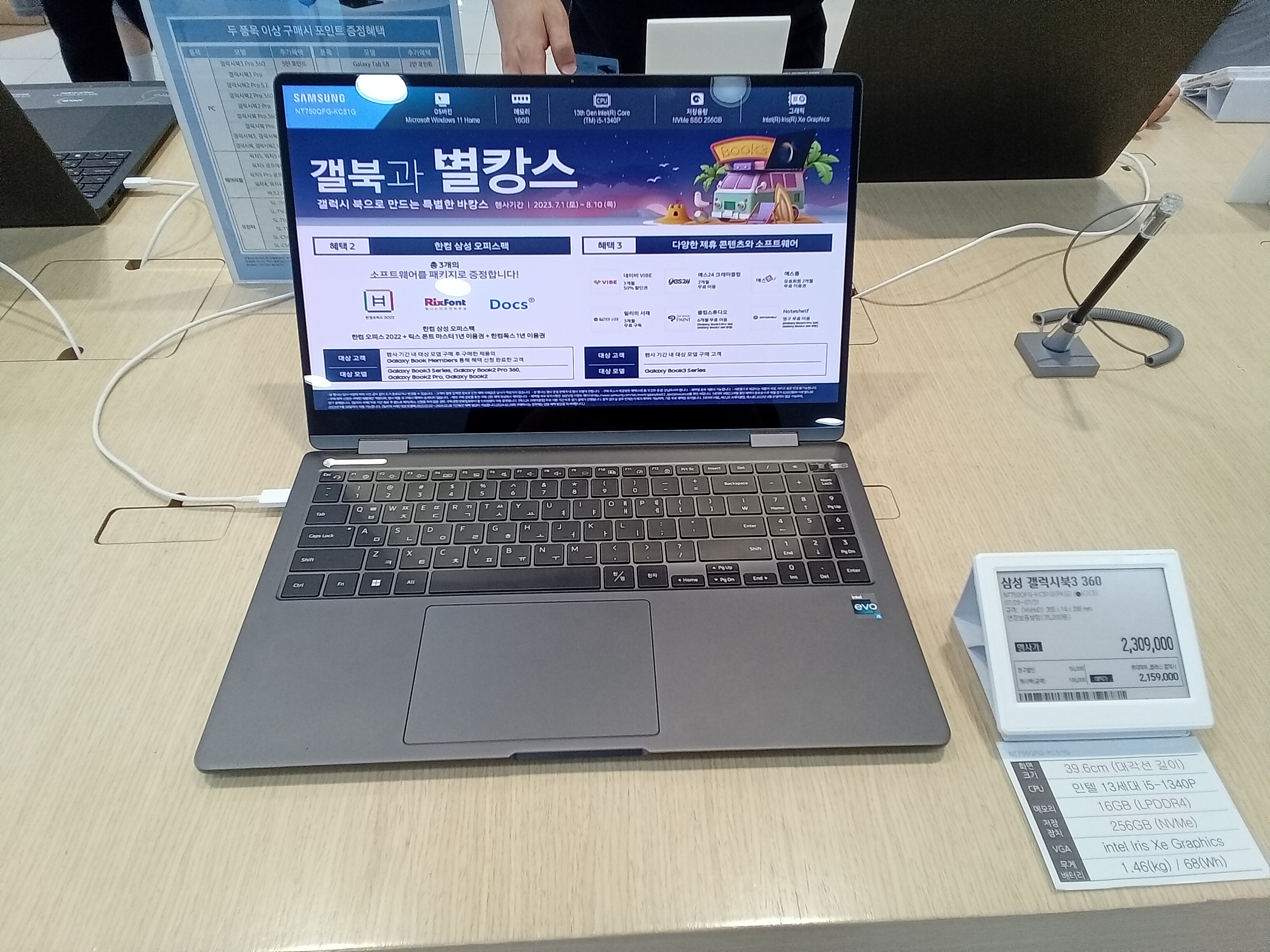
- Brand: Samsung
- Manufacturer: Samsung Electronics
- Type: Laptop computer
- Series: Galaxy Book
- Family: Samsung Galaxy
- First released: April 28, 2021; 5 years ago
- Related: Samsung Galaxy Book (2021)
- Dimensions: 302.5 mm (11.91 in) H 202 mm (8.0 in) W 11.5 mm (0.45 in) D
- Weight: 1.04 kg (2.29 lbs)
- Operating system: Original: Windows 10; Current: Windows 11
- System-on-chip: Intel Core i5 1135G7; Intel Core i7 1165G7
- Memory: 8GB, 16GB RAM
- Storage: 256GB, 512GB, 1024GB
- Battery: 65W charging
- Front camera: 720p webcam
- Display: 13.3 in (340 mm); 1920 x 1080 (FHD) AMOLED Display
- Sound: AKG Stereo Speakers with Dolby Atmos
- Data inputs: Keyboard, S Pen
- Other: Graphics: Intel Iris Xe Graphics G7 (80EU)
- Website: www.samsung.com/us/computing/galaxy-book-pro/

Samsung Galaxy Book Pro is a notebook computer manufactured, developed and designed by Samsung Electronics, it was announced on April 28, 2021 at the Galaxy Unpacked event alongside the Galaxy Book (2021) and the Galaxy Book Odyssey. It has a 13.3 inch display with 1080p resolution and a 720p webcam.

Model/Series Versions
Model/Series	Touch/2-in-1?	Dimensions (W x D x H)	Weight	Webcam?	Ref.
Galaxy Book Pro (2021) 13.3"	No	304.4 x 199.8 x 11.2mm	~0.88kg	720HD	
Galaxy Book Pro (2021) 15.6"	No	355.4 x 225.8 x 11.7mm	~1.05kg	720HD	
Galaxy Book2 Pro 360 (2022) 13.3″	Yes	302.5 x 202 x 11.5mm	~1.04kg	"Full HD"	
Galaxy Book2 Pro 360 (2022) 15.6″	Yes	354.9 x 228 x 11.9mm	~1.39kg	"HD"	
Galaxy Book3 Pro (2023) 14″	No	312.3 x 223.8 x 11.3mm	~1.17kg	1920x1080HD	
Galaxy Book3 Pro (2023) 16″	No	355.4 x 250.4 x 12.5mm	~1.56kg	1920x1080HD	
Galaxy Book3 Pro 360 (2023) 16″	Yes	355.4 x 252.2 x 12.8mm	~1.66kg	1920x1080HD	
Galaxy Book4 Pro (2024) 14″	Yes	312.3 x 223.8 x 11.6mm	~1.23kg	2M Camera	
Galaxy Book4 Pro (2024) 16″	Yes	355.4 x 250.4 x 12.5mm	~1.56kg	2M Camera	
Galaxy Book4 Pro 360 (2024) 16″	Yes	355.4 x 252.2 x 12.8mm	~1.66kg	2M Camera	
Galaxy Book5 Pro (2025) 14″	Yes	312.3 x 223.8 x 11.6mm	~1.23kg	2M Camera	
Galaxy Book5 Pro (2025) 16″	Yes	355.4 x 250.4 x 12.5mm	~1.56kg	2M Camera	
Galaxy Book5 Pro 360 (2025) 16″	Yes	355.4 x 252.2 x 12.8mm	~1.69kg	2M Camera	
Galaxy Book6 Pro (2026) 14″	-	-	-	-	-
Galaxy Book6 Pro (2026) 16″	-	-	-	-	-
Galaxy Book6 Pro 360 (2026) 16″	-	-	-	-	-
