= Samsung Galaxy Z Flip 4 =

2022 foldable smartphone by Samsung Electronics

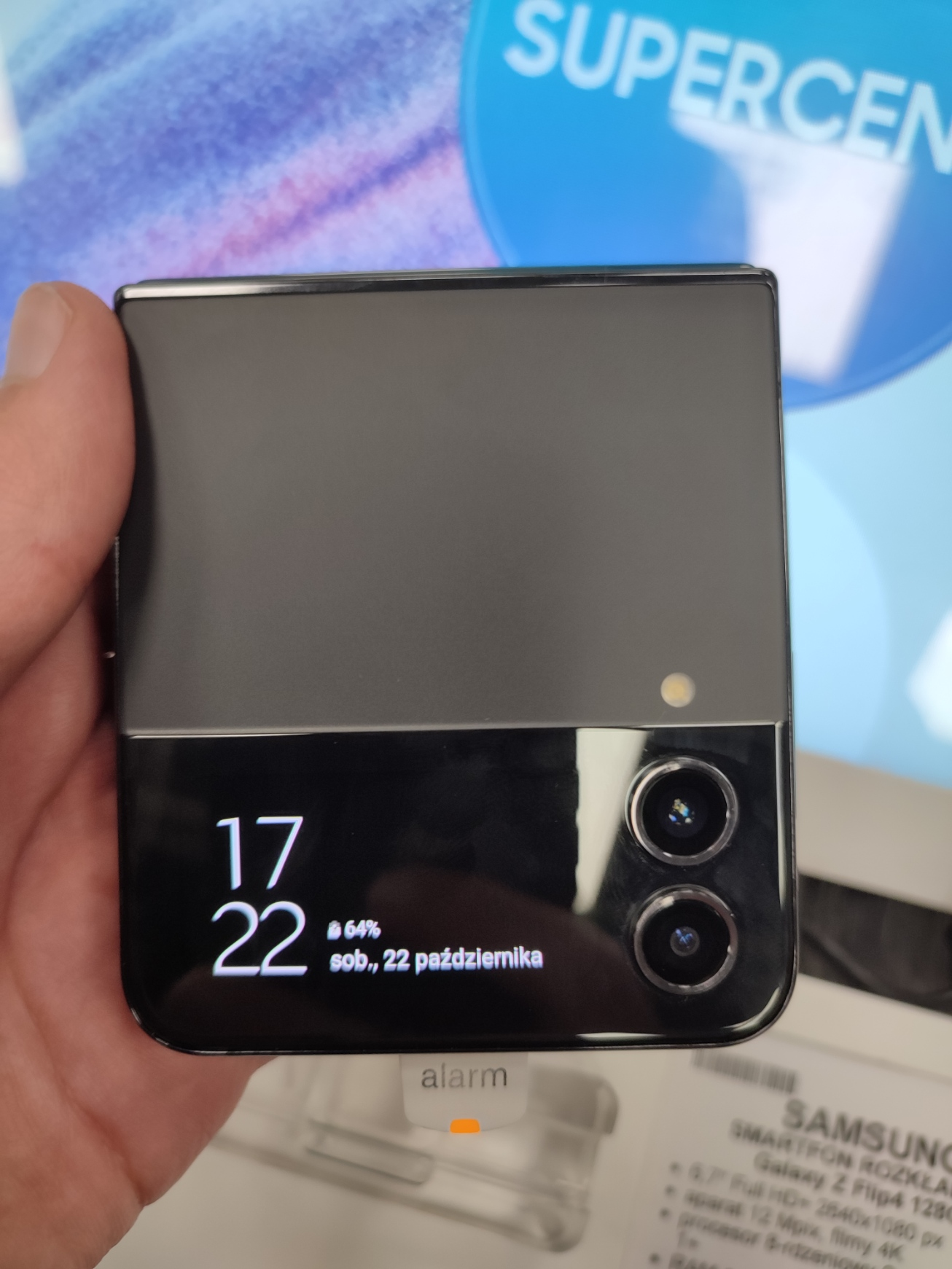
- Front of the Samsung Galaxy Z Flip 4
- Also known as: Samsung Galaxy Flip 4 (in certain European countries)
- Brand: Samsung
- Manufacturer: Samsung Electronics
- Type: Foldable smartphone
- Series: Galaxy Z
- Family: Samsung Galaxy
- First released: August 25, 2022; 4 years ago
- Availability by region: August 25, 2022; 4 years ago
- Discontinued: July 26, 2023; 3 years ago
- Predecessor: Samsung Galaxy Z Flip 3 Samsung Galaxy Z Flip 3 Bespoke Edition
- Successor: Samsung Galaxy Z Flip 5
- Related: Samsung Galaxy S22; Samsung Galaxy Z Fold 4
- Compatible networks: 2G / 3G / 4G LTE / 5G NR / 5G UW
- Form factor: Foldable slate
- Colors: Bora Purple, Blue, Pink Gold, Graphite
- Dimensions: Unfolded: 165.2 mm (6.50 in) H 71.9 mm (2.83 in) W 6.9 mm (0.27 in) D Folded: 84.9 mm (3.34 in) H 71.9 mm (2.83 in) W 15.9–17.1 mm (0.63–0.67 in) D
- Weight: 187 g (6.6 oz)
- Operating system: Original: Android 12L with One UI 4.1.1; Current: Android 16 with One UI 8
- System-on-chip: Qualcomm Snapdragon 8+ Gen 1
- CPU: Octa-core (1x3.19 GHz Cortex-X2 & 3x2.75 GHz Cortex-A710 & 4x1.80 GHz Cortex-A510)
- GPU: Adreno 730
- Memory: 8 GB RAM
- Storage: 128 GB, 256 GB, 512 GB UFS 3.1
- Removable storage: None
- SIM: Nano-SIM and eSIM
- Battery: 3700 mAh
- Charging: USB PD: 25W (PPS), 15W (non-PPS); Fast wireless charging 10W; Reverse wireless charging 4.5W
- Rear camera: 12 MP, f/1.8, 24mm (wide), 1/2.55", 1.8 μm, Dual Pixel PDAF, OIS; 12 MP, f/2.2, 123° (ultrawide), 1.12 μm 4K@30/60fps, 1080p@60/240fps, 720p@960fps, HDR10+
- Front camera: 10 MP, f/2.4, 26mm (wide), 1.22 μm 4K@30fps
- Display: 6.7 in (170 mm), Infinity-O Display; 2640 × 1080 resolution Foldable Dynamic AMOLED 2X, 120Hz, HDR10+, 1200 nits (peak)
- External display: 1.9 in (48 mm); 512 × 260 resolution Super AMOLED
- Sound: Stereo speakers 32-bit/384kHz audio Tuned by AKG
- Connectivity: Wi-Fi 802.11 a/b/g/n/ac/6, dual-band, Wi-Fi Direct, hotspot Bluetooth 5.2, A2DP, LE
- Data inputs: Multi-touch screen; USB Type-C 2.0; Fingerprint scanner; Accelerometer; Gyroscope; Proximity sensor; Compass; Barometer
- Water resistance: IPX8 water resistant (up to 1.5m for 30 mins)
- Model: International models: SM-F721x (last letter varies by carrier and international models); Japanese models: SCG17 (au); SC-54C (NTT Docomo); SM-F721C (Rakuten Mobile)
- Website: Galaxy Z Flip 4

The Samsung Galaxy Z Flip 4 (stylized as Samsung Galaxy Z Flip4, sold as Samsung Galaxy Flip 4 in certain territories) is a clamshell-styled, Android-based, foldable smartphone manufactured, developed and marketed by Samsung Electronics, as part of its Galaxy Z series. First released in August 2022 succeeding the popular Galaxy Z Flip 3 as Samsung's third-generation Z Flip model, the Galaxy Z Flip 4 featured minor exterior changes like reduced bezels, and redesigned mechanical gears resulting in a slimmer hinge. Inside, the phone used a Snapdragon 8+ processor in place of the previous power-hungry Snapdragon 888, which combined with a physically larger battery and faster (25 W, up from 15 W) charging speed was an attempt to fix the highly criticised poor battery life of its predecessor. The primary camera sensor was also upgraded.

== History ==
Danna Paola in an advertisement for the Samsung Galaxy Z Flip 4

It was announced on August 10, 2022 at the Samsung's Galaxy Unpacked event, alongside the Galaxy Z Fold 4 and the Galaxy Watch 5, and released subsequently on August 25, 2022, as the successor to the Galaxy Z Flip 3.

The Galaxy Z Flip 4 was succeeded by the Galaxy Z Flip 5 on July 26, 2023.

== Design ==
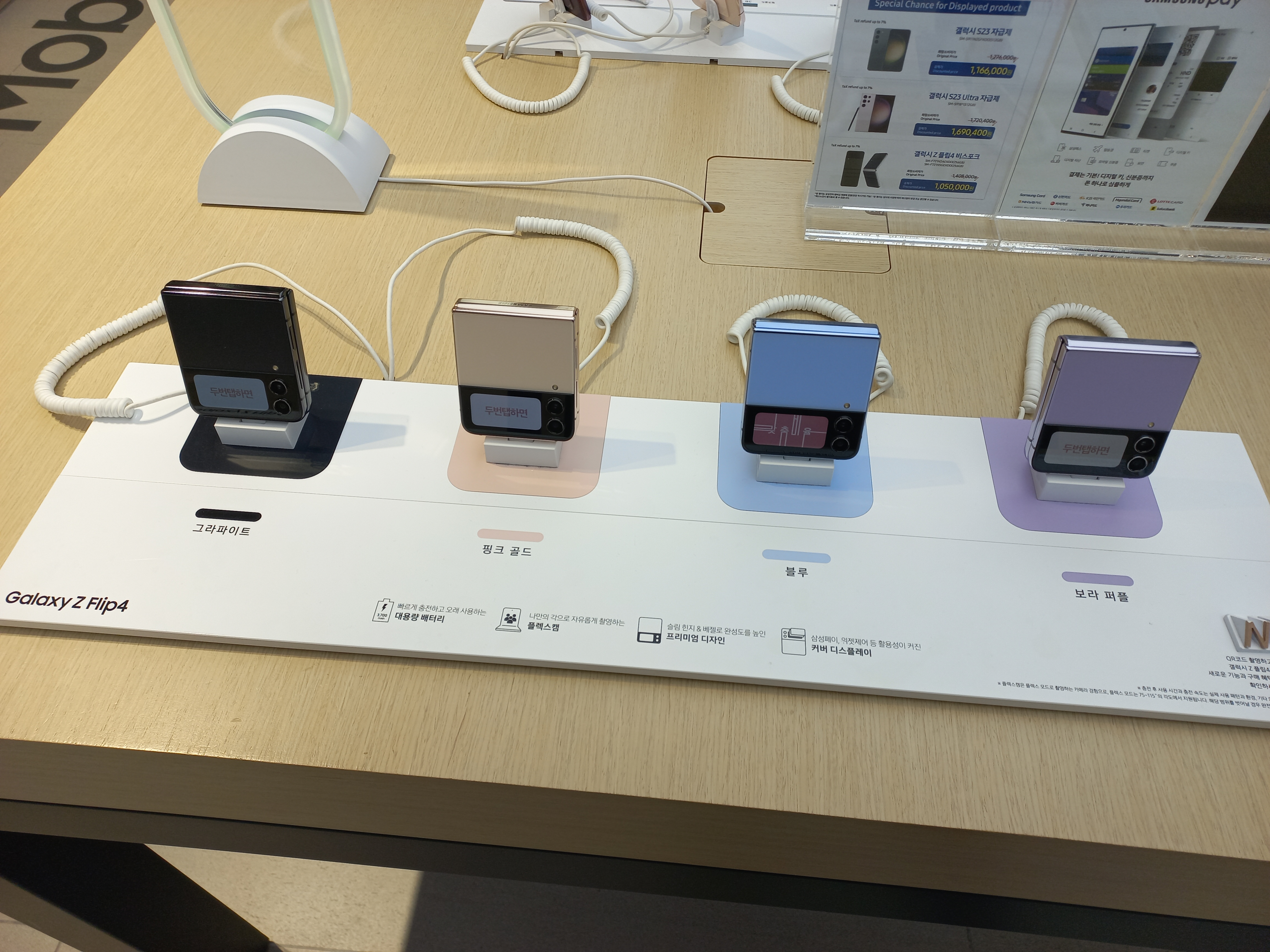
The Galaxy Z Flip 4 in its four colorways

The Z Flip 4 uses the same clamshell design as the Z Flip with an aluminum frame, it has a 6.7-in display protected by ultra-thin glass made by Samsung that can be folded into a space of 4.2-inch. It also adopts 1.9-inch cover screen. This change in cover screen enables users to download widgets such as music, weather, alarm, timer, voice recorder, today's schedule, Samsung Health, and Bluetooth.

The Samsung Galaxy Z Flip 4 is available in four colors: Graphite, Pink Gold, Bora Purple and Blue.

Model	Galaxy Z Flip 4
Base colors	Bora Purple; Blue; Pink Gold; Graphite

== Specifications ==
=== Display ===
The Galaxy Z Flip 4 continues to have similar screen specifications from its predecessor: a 6.7-inch inner display with a 120 Hz variable refresh rate and a 1.9-inch cover display.

The device has 8 GB of RAM, and either 128 GB, 256 GB or 512 GB of UFS 3.1 flash storage, with no support for expanding the device's storage capacity via micro-SD cards.

The Z Flip 4 is powered by the Qualcomm Snapdragon 8+ Gen 1.

The device's included battery is a 3700 mAh dual-cell unit that fast charges via USB-C up to 25 W, or via wireless charging up to 10 W.

The Z Flip 4 features two rear cameras, including a 12 MP wide-angle camera and a 12 MP ultra-wide camera. It has a 10 MP front-facing camera at the top of the display.

=== Software ===
The Galaxy Z Flip 4 was shipped with Android 12L and Samsung's custom One UI 4.1.1 skin. It has promised 4 OS upgrades and 5 years of security updates for the device (with support ending within 2027).

	Pre-installed OS	OS Upgrades history				End of support
	Pre-installed OS	1st	2nd	3rd	4th	End of support
Z Flip 4	Android 12L (One UI 4.1.1)	Android 13 (One UI 5.0); November 2022 (One UI 5.1); February 2023	Android 14 (One UI 6.0); Dectember 2023 (One UI 6.1); May 2024 (One UI 6.1.1); September 2024	Android 15 (One UI 7.0); May 2025	Android 16 (One UI 8.0); October 2025	Within 2027

== See also ==
- Samsung Galaxy Z series
- Samsung Galaxy Z Fold 4

Preceded by Samsung Galaxy Z Flip 3	Samsung Galaxy Z Flip 4; 2022	Succeeded by Samsung Galaxy Z Flip 5
