= Samsung Galaxy Watch 3 =

2020 smartwatch developed by Samsung Electronics

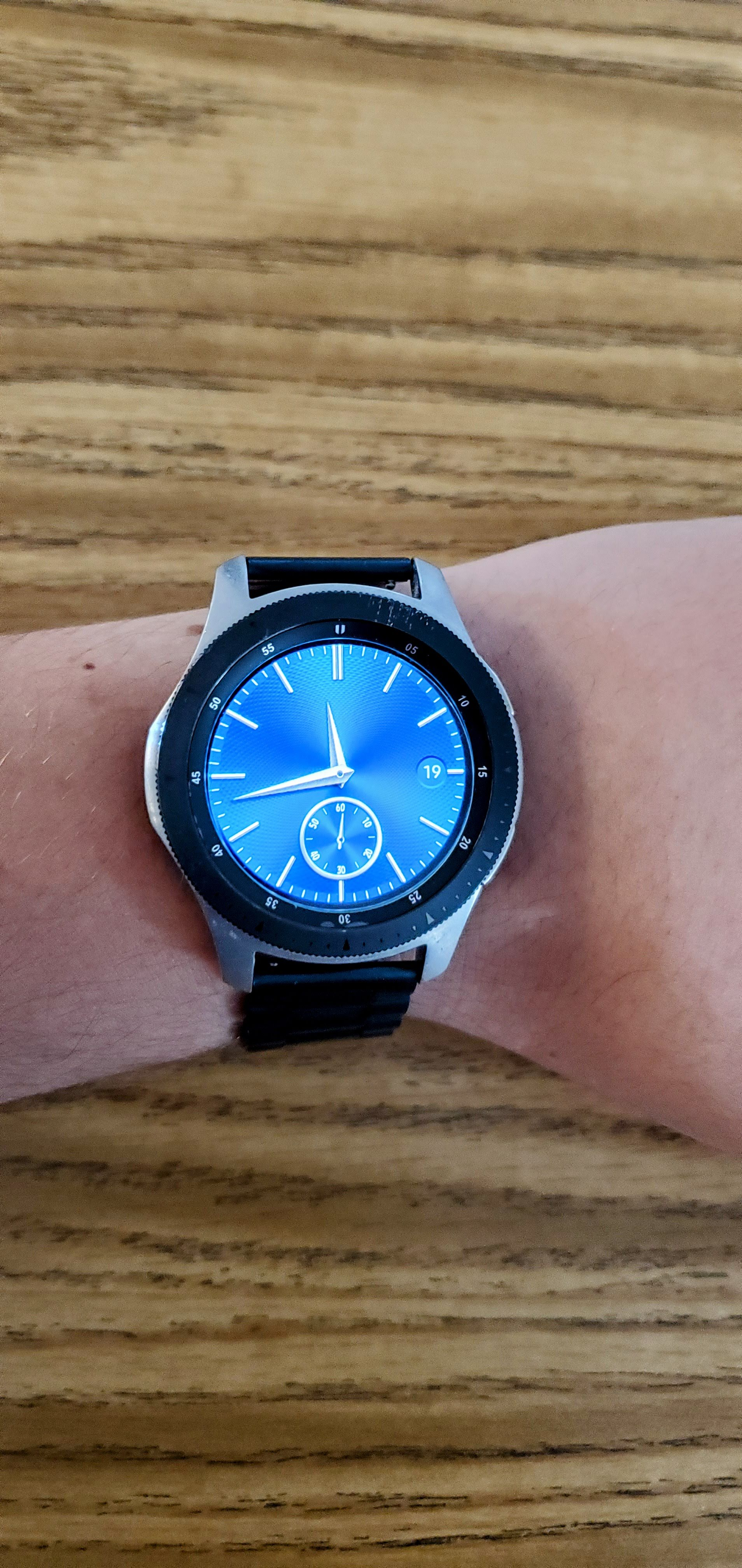
- A Samsung Galaxy Watch 3
- Brand: Samsung
- Manufacturer: Samsung Electronics
- Type: Smartwatch
- Series: Galaxy Watch
- Family: Samsung Galaxy
- First released: August 5, 2020; 6 years ago
- Predecessor: Samsung Galaxy Watch
- Successor: Samsung Galaxy Watch 4
- Related: Samsung Galaxy Watch Active 2
- Compatible networks: 2G, 3G, 4G
- Operating system: Tizen OS 5.5 Tizen OS 5.5.0.1
- Memory: 1 GB RAM
- Storage: 8 GB
- Battery: Non-removable 340 mAh; Qi Wireless charging
- Display: 1.4 in (36 mm) Super AMOLED capacitive display, 360×360 pixels, 16 M colours, ~257 ppi density, 6.3cm2, 1:1 aspect ratio, glass front (Gorilla Glass DX), touch sensitive bezel
- External display: Always On Display
- Connectivity: HSPA/LTE, 3G/HSDPA/850/900/2100, 4G/1/3/5/7/8/20, Speed, HSPA 42.2/5.76 Mbps, LTE, Wi-Fi 802.11/b/g/n, Bluetooth 5.0, A2DP, LE, A-GPS, GLONASS, GALILEO, BDS, 3IGL, eSIM, MIL-STD-810G compliant, ECG certified
- Data inputs: Heart rate monitor; Accelerometer; Gyroscope; Barometer; Natural language commands & dictation
- Model: SM-R855F, SM-R845F (Global, LTE model), SM-R855U, SM-R845U (USA, LTE model), SM-R850, SM-840 (Wi-Fi only)

The Samsung Galaxy Watch 3 (stylized as Samsung Galaxy Watch3) is a smartwatch developed by Samsung Electronics that was released on August 5, 2020 at Samsung's Unpacked Event alongside the flagships of the Galaxy Note series and Galaxy Z series, i.e., the Samsung Galaxy Note 20 and Samsung Galaxy Z Fold 2, respectively.

Due to limitations of the COVID-19 pandemic on certain social gatherings, the smartwatch was released via Samsung's online channels.

== Specifications ==
=== Hardware ===
The Galaxy Watch 3 comes with a 1.4 (360×360) inch circular Super AMOLED display with a pixel density of 257 PPI (360 pixels/1.4-inches= 257.14 Pixels/Inch), powered by a non-removable 340 mAh battery and recharged using Qi inductive charging. The smartwatch has 1 GB of RAM and 8 GB of internal storage. The Galaxy Watch 3 also features a fully rotatable physical bezel with the display glass made from Corning Gorilla Glass DX. The device is compatible with a 20 or 22 mm straps, depending on model. The Galaxy Watch 3 comes in Bronze, Black, and Silver colour options.

Model	Galaxy Watch3		Ref.
Size	41 mm	45 mm	
Colors	Mystic Bronze, Mystic Silver	Mystic Black, Mystic Silver (premium titanium model available in Mystic Black only)	
Display	1.2-inch (30 mm), full-color, always-on Circular Super AMOLED	1.4-inch (34 mm), full-color, always-on Circular Super AMOLED	
Resolution	360×360 pixels		
Model No.	SM-R850 (Wi-Fi/Bluetooth only), SM-R855U (Unlocked USA LTE model), SM-R855F (Global LTE), SM-R855N (Korea LTE only), SM-R8450 (China LTE, 45 mm only)	SM-R840 (US Wi-Fi/Bluetooth only), SM-R845U (Unlocked US LTE), SM-R845F (Global LTE), SM-R845N (Korea LTE only)	
SIM	eSim (LTE models only)		
Chassis/Band Materials	Stainless steel 316L frame with premium leather strap	Stainless steel 316L frame with premium leather strap (accepts all 22 mm watch straps/bands); Titanium frame model with metal strap (accepts all 22 mm watch straps/bands)	
Glass	Corning Gorilla Glass DX		
Processor/GPU	Exynos 9110 (10nm) dual-core 1.15 GHz ARM Cortex-A53; GPU: Mali-T720		
Memory (RAM)	1 GB		
Operating System	Tizen (OS 5.5)		
Dimensions	41 × 42.5 × 11.3 mm (measured without strap)	45 × 46.2 × 11.1 mm (measured without strap)	
Weight (without strap)	48.2 g	53.8 g (stainless steel); 43 g (titanium)	
Strap/Band Size	20 mm (accepts most universal 20 mm watch straps/bands)	22 mm (accepts most universal 22 mm watch straps/bands)	
Durability/ Water Resistance	MIL-STD-810G, Water Resistance to 5 ATM (50m) + IP68 rated		
Storage	1 GB RAM		
Storage	8 GB Internal Storage (eMMC)		
Connectivity	All models: Wi-Fi 802.11/b/g/n, Bluetooth 5.0, A2DP, LE, A-GPS, GLONASS, GALILEO, BDS		
Connectivity	US LTE models (SM-R845U, SM-R855U), via eSIM: LTE bands 2/4/5/12/13/25/26/66/71; UTMS bands 2/4/5 US carrier support: Verizon, T-Mobile/Sprint, AT&T		
Connectivity	International LTE models (SM-R845F, SM-R855F), via eSIM: LTE bands 1/3/5/7/8/20/28; UTMS bands 1/5/8 GSM/HSPA/LTE, 2G/GSM/850/900/1800/2100, 3G/HSDPA/850/900/2100 Korea-only LTE models (SM-R845N, SM-R855N), via eSIM: LTE bands 1/3/5/7/8; UTMS bands 1/5/8		
Connectivity		China-only, 45 mm LTE only (SM-R8450), via eSIM: LTE bands 1/3/5/8/38/39/40/41); UTMS bands 1/8	
Sensors	Accelerometer, Barometer, Gyro Sensor, Electrical Heart Sensor (ECG), Optical Heart Rate Sensor(HRM), Light Sensor		
Battery	247 mAh	340 mAh	

=== Software ===
The smartwatch was released with Tizen 5.5 that features Samsung's unique software overlay.

As of September 2025, Tizen is no longer supported on smartwatches per company policy. The watch and recovery will still function, but no new apps can be downloaded.

== Pricing ==
The Galaxy Watch 3 has a retail price of US$399 for the 41 mm and US$479 for the 45 mm option.

== Reception ==
Ars Technica called Galaxy Watch 3 a “refresh” of Galaxy Watch Active2, which does not have “a ton in the way of new features outside added fall detection”, but “offers all the conveniences you’d expect, like the ability to take calls, check voicemails, and send texts”.

Engadget called Galaxy Watch 3 “the best non-Apple smartwatch”.

== See also ==
- Samsung Galaxy S21
