= Samsung Galaxy Watch Active 2 =

Fitness Smartwatch

Samsung Galaxy Watch Active2 (SM-R820/R830)
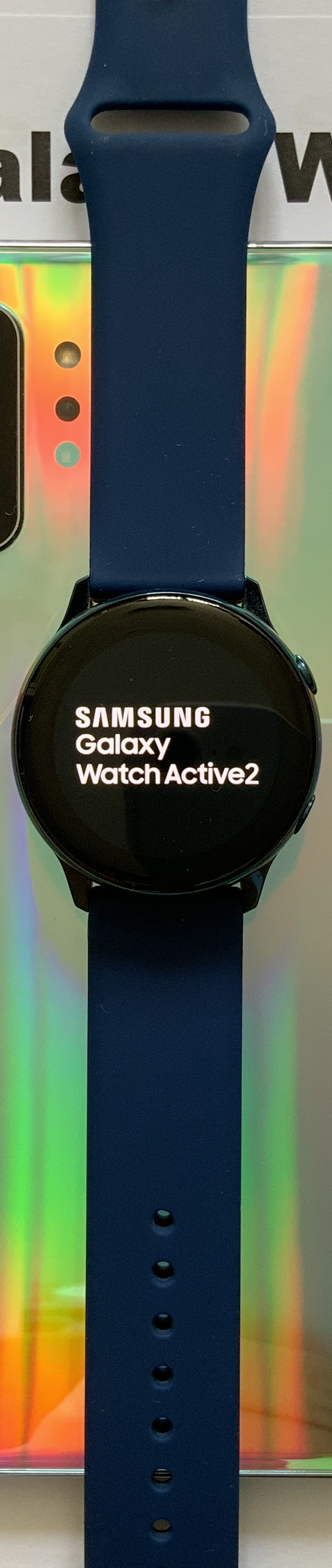
- Developer: Samsung Electronics
- Manufacturer: Samsung Electronics
- Product family: Samsung Galaxy Watch series
- Type: Smartwatch
- Released: 5 August 2019
- Operating system: Tizen OS 5.5
- System on a chip: Exynos 9110 (10 nm)
- Display: 1.4 Super AMOLED
- Dimensions: 44 × 44 × 10.9 mm (1.73 × 1.73 × 0.43 in)
- Weight: 42 g (1.48 oz)
- Predecessor: Samsung Galaxy Watch Active
- Successor: Samsung Galaxy Watch 4
- Related: Samsung Galaxy
- Website: Official website

The Samsung Galaxy Watch Active 2 (stylized as Samsung Galaxy Watch Active2) is a smartwatch developed by Samsung Electronics, running the Tizen operating system. Announced on 5 August 2019, the Active 2 was scheduled for availability in the United States starting on 23 September 2019.

The Active 2 was released in two sizes, 40 mm or 44 mm, and two connectivity formats, either Bluetooth or LTE capability. The LTE version functions as a standalone phone and allows a user to call, text, pay, and stream music or video without a nearby smartphone. An Under Armour Edition of the Active 2 was released on October 11, 2019, containing a watch face and strap branded with the Under Armour logo.

Samsung announced as part of the move to move from Tizen OS to Wear OS by Google starting from August 2022. The Watch Active 2 stopped receiving software and security updates, while the Watch 3 stopped receiving software updates in 2023.

== Specifications ==
Model	Galaxy Watch Active 2		Ref.
Size	40 mm	44 mm	
Colors	Silver, Black, Gold	Silver, Black, Gold	
Display	1.2" (30 mm)	1.4" (34 mm)	
Resolution	360 x 360 pixels		
Part No.	SM-R830	SM-R820	
Glass	Corning Gorilla Glass DX+		
Processor	Exynos 9110 dual core 1.15 GHz		
Operating System	Tizen (OS 4.0)		
Size	40 mm x 40 mm x 10.9 mm	44 mm x 44 mm x 10.9 mm	
Weight (without strap)	26 g	30 g	
Strap Size	20 mm		
Water Resistance	5 ATM + IP68		
Memory	LTE version: 1.5 GiB RAM + 4 GiB flash memory		
Memory	Bluetooth version: 768 MiB RAM + 4 GiB flash memory		
Connectivity	3G/LTE with eSIM (Galaxy Watch LTE-Version only, R825 and R835); Bluetooth 5.0; Wi-Fi b/g/n; NFC; A-GPS, GLONASS		
Sensors	MEMS Accelerometer; MEMS Gyroscope; MEMS Barometer; Electro-optical sensor (for heart rate monitoring); Electrocardiogram ECG (for heart rate monitoring); Photodetector (for ambient light)		
Battery	247 mAh	340 mAh	
