= Samsung Galaxy Fit =

Samsung Galaxy Fit may refer to:

- Samsung Galaxy Fit (smartphone), a smartphone released in 2011
- Samsung Galaxy Fit (smartwatch), a smartwatch released in 2019
- Samsung Galaxy Fit series, the series of smartwatches
