= Samsung Galaxy Fit series =

Activity tracker series designed by Samsung Electronics

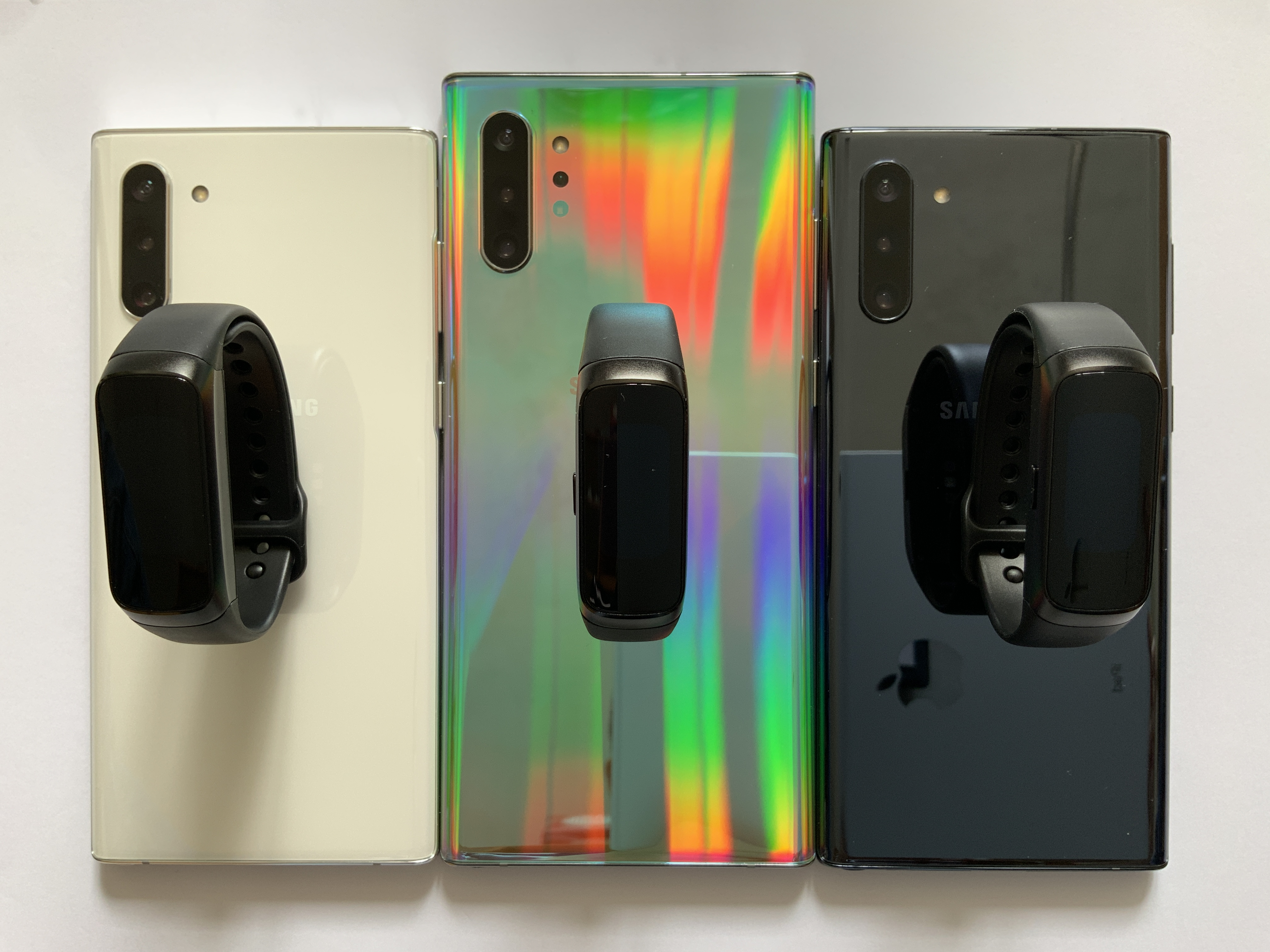
- The 1st generation of Samsung Galaxy Fit
- Developer: Samsung Electronics
- Product family: Samsung
- Type: Activity trackers
- Released: Galaxy Fit: June 14, 2019; Galaxy Fit 2: October 2, 2020; Galaxy Fit 3: July 24, 2024
- Predecessor: Samsung Gear
- Related: Samsung Galaxy Watch series Samsung Galaxy Buds series
- Website: www.samsung.com/levant/watches/galaxy-fit/

The Samsung Galaxy Fit series is a line of activity trackers manufactured, developed, designed and marketed by Samsung Electronics as part of their Galaxy line, slotted below the Galaxy Watch series. The 1st generation was first announced on February 20, 2019, alongside the Galaxy S10 series, the Galaxy Fold, the Galaxy Watch Active and the Galaxy Buds 1st generation at the Samsung's Galaxy Unpacked event, and released on June 14, 2019, as the successor to the Gear Fit 2 Pro.

Galaxy Fit series release timeline
2019	Samsung Galaxy Fit / Fit e
2020	Samsung Galaxy Fit 2
2021
2022
2023
2024	Samsung Galaxy Fit 3

== Models ==
=== Galaxy Fit ===
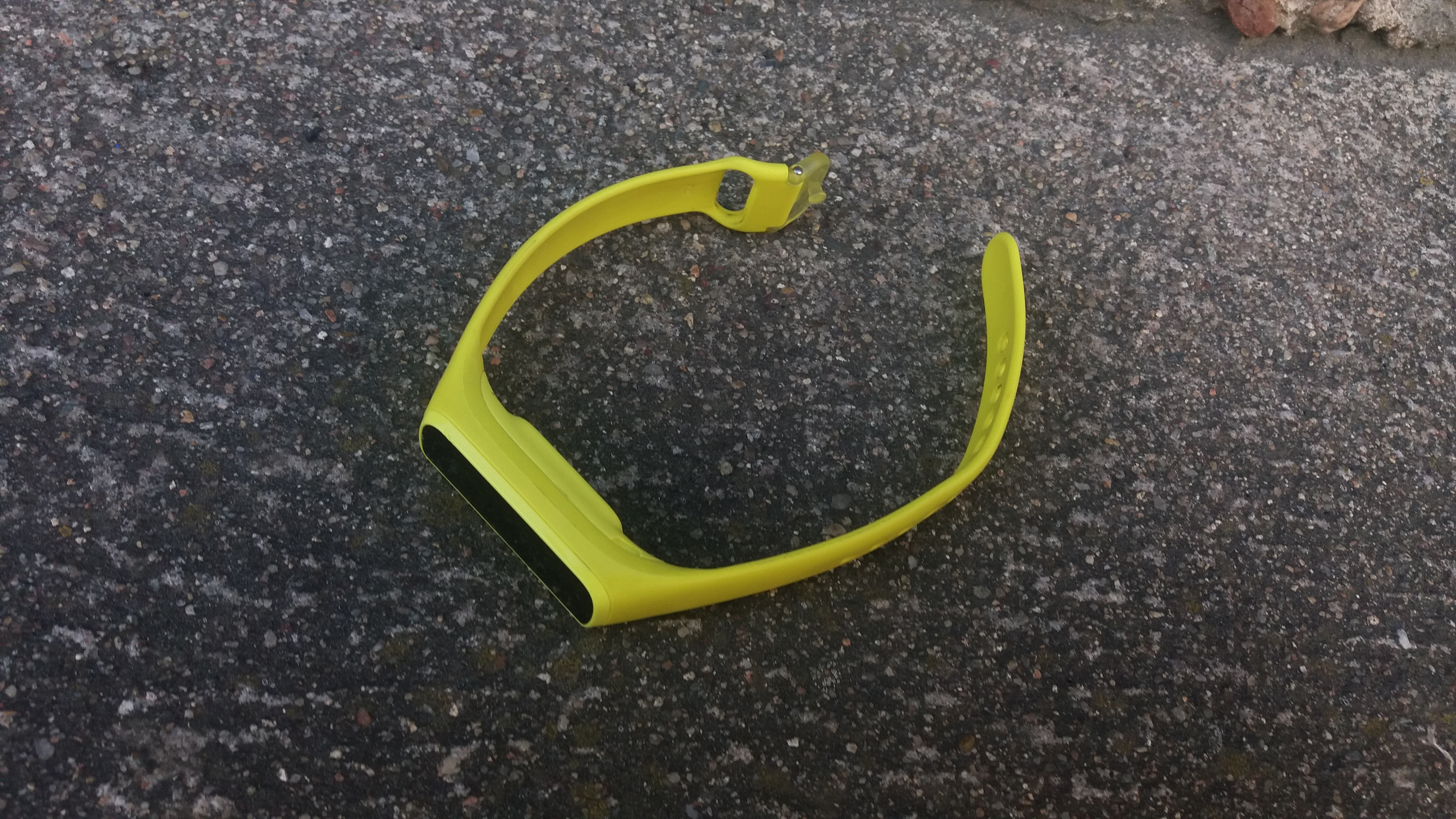
Galaxy Fit e

The watch measures 18.3 mm × 44.6 mm × 11.2 mm (0.72 in × 1.76 in × 0.44 in), without the strap, with a weight of 23 grams (0.81 oz). It features a 0.95-inch (24 mm) 120x240 AMOLED touchscreen display, with 32MB of internal storage and 2MB of RAM. It contains a 120 mAh battery, and has an accelerometer, gyroscope, and heartrate sensor. It is also rated waterproof up to 5ATM. The watch can be charged wirelessly through near-field communication.

=== Galaxy Fit 2 ===
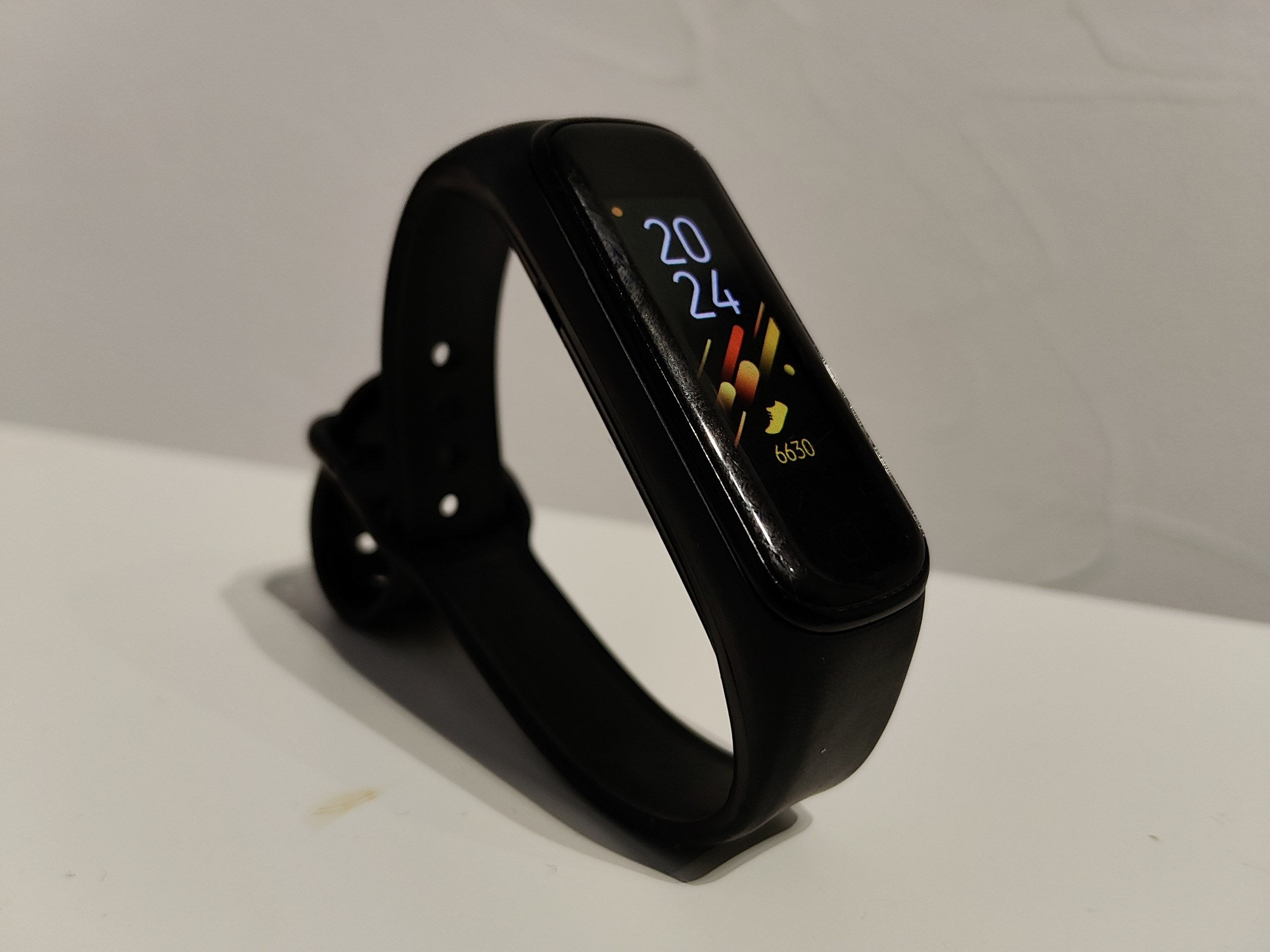
Galaxy Fit2

The Samsung Galaxy Fit 2 was announced on September 1, 2020, at the Samsung's Galaxy Unpacked event, alongside the Galaxy Z Fold 2 full details announcement, and released on October 2, 2020.

=== Galaxy Fit 3 ===
The most current version is the Galaxy Fit 3 Watch which was released in 2024 for Asian, European, Central American and South American markets and in early 2025 in the US market. It uses an ARM Cortex-M33.
