= Samsung Galaxy Z Fold 3 =

2021 foldable smartphone by Samsung Electronics

- Galaxy Z Fold 3 (Phantom silver)
- Also known as: Samsung Galaxy Fold 3 (in certain European countries)
- Brand: Samsung
- Manufacturer: Samsung Electronics
- Type: Foldable smartphone
- Series: Galaxy Z
- Family: Samsung Galaxy
- First released: August 27, 2021; 5 years ago
- Availability by region: August 27, 2021; 5 years ago
- Discontinued: August 10, 2022; 4 years ago
- Units sold: 2.5 million units
- Predecessor: Samsung Galaxy Note 20 (indirect); Samsung Galaxy Z Fold 2
- Successor: Samsung Galaxy Z Fold 4
- Related: Samsung Galaxy S21; Samsung Galaxy Z Flip 3
- Compatible networks: 2G, 3G, 4G, 4G LTE, 5G
- Form factor: Foldable slate
- Dimensions: Unfolded: 158.2 mm (6.23 in) H 128.1 mm (5.04 in) W 6.4 mm (0.25 in) D Folded: 158.2 mm (6.23 in) H 67.1 mm (2.64 in) W 14.4–16 mm (0.57–0.63 in) D
- Weight: 271 g (9.6 oz)
- Operating system: Original: Android 11 with One UI 3.1.1; Current: Android 15 with One UI 7
- System-on-chip: Qualcomm Snapdragon 888
- CPU: Octa-core (1x 2.84 GHz, 3x 2.42 GHz and 4x 1.8 GHz) Kryo 680
- GPU: Adreno 660
- Memory: 12 GB LPDDR5
- Storage: 256 GB or 512 GB UFS 3.1
- Removable storage: Unsupported
- SIM: nanoSIM, eSIM (USA Variants Are Single SIM Only, Without eSIM)
- Battery: 4400 mAh
- Charging: 25 W USB-C; 10 W Wireless
- Rear camera: 12 MP, f/1.8, 26mm, 1/1.76", 1.8 μm (wide); 12 MP, f/2.4, 52mm, 1/3.6", 1.0 μm (telephoto); 12 MP, f/2.2, 12mm, 1.12 μm (ultrawide); Dual Pixel PDAF, PDAF, OIS, gyro-EIS, HDR, 2x optical zoom 4K@60 fps, 1080p@60/240 fps, 1080p@24/30/60120 fps (Pro Mode), 720p@960 fps, HDR10+
- Front camera: Under-display 4 MP, f/1.8, 1.0 μm Cover: 10 MP, f/2.2, 26mm, 1/3", 1.22 μm Gyro-EIS, HDR; 4K@30 fps, 1080p@30 fps
- Display: Dynamic AMOLED 2X, 2208 × 1768, 7.6 in (19.3 cm), ~5:4 aspect ratio, 374 ppi, HDR10+, 120 Hz refresh rate
- External display: Dynamic AMOLED 2X, 2268 × 832, 6.23 in (15.8 cm), ~24.5:9 ratio, 389 ppi, HDR10+, 120 Hz refresh rate
- Sound: Dolby Atmos stereo speakers
- Connectivity: Bluetooth 5.2, A2DP, low-energy, aptX HD; Wi-Fi 802.11 a/b/g/n/ac/6e, dual-band
- Data inputs: USB-C 3.2, Touch screen, Stylus Sensors: Accelerometer; Barometer; Fingerprint scanner (side button); Pressure sensor; Gyroscope; Hall sensor; Proximity sensor; Magnetometer
- Water resistance: IPX8, up to 1.5 m (4.9 ft) for 30 minutes
- Model: SM-F926B; SCG11 (Japan; au); SC-55B (Japan; NTT Docomo)
- Codename: Project Q2
- Website: "SM-F926UZGAXAA | Galaxy Z Fold3 5G 256GB (Unlocked) Phantom Green | Samsung Business US". Samsung Electronics America.

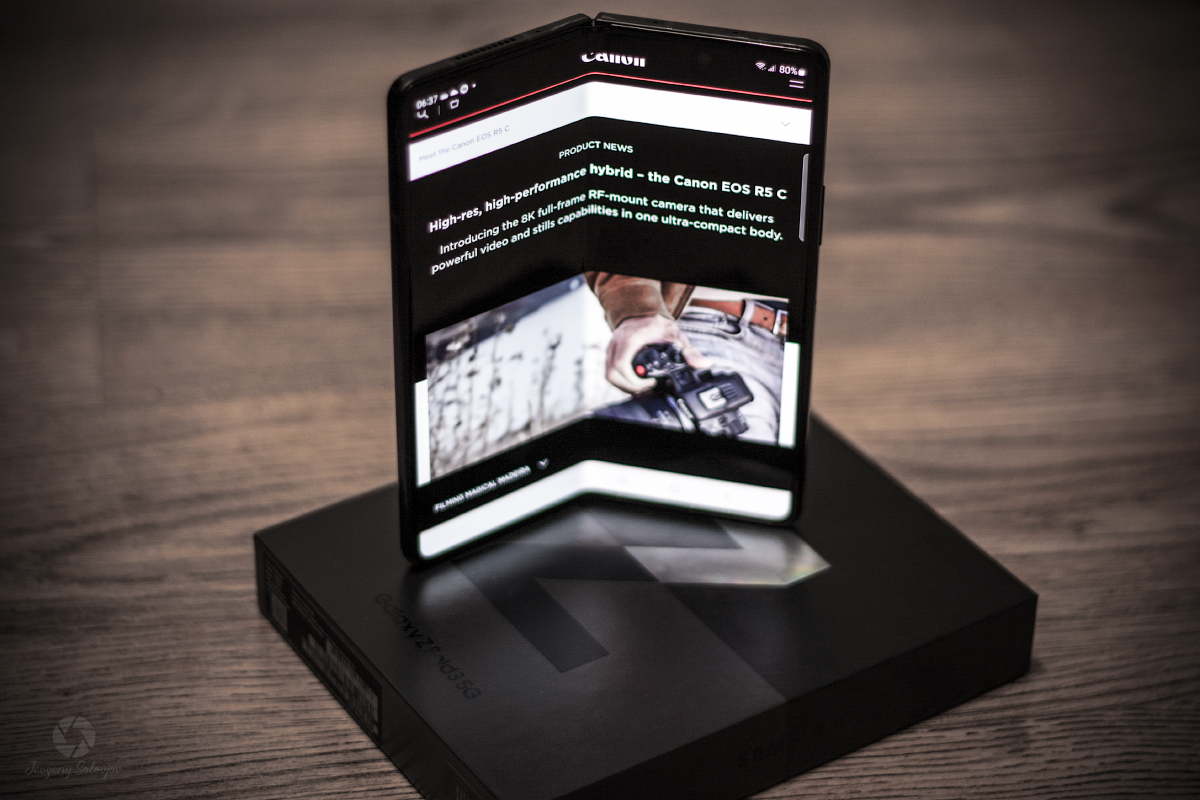
Samsung Galaxy Fold 3

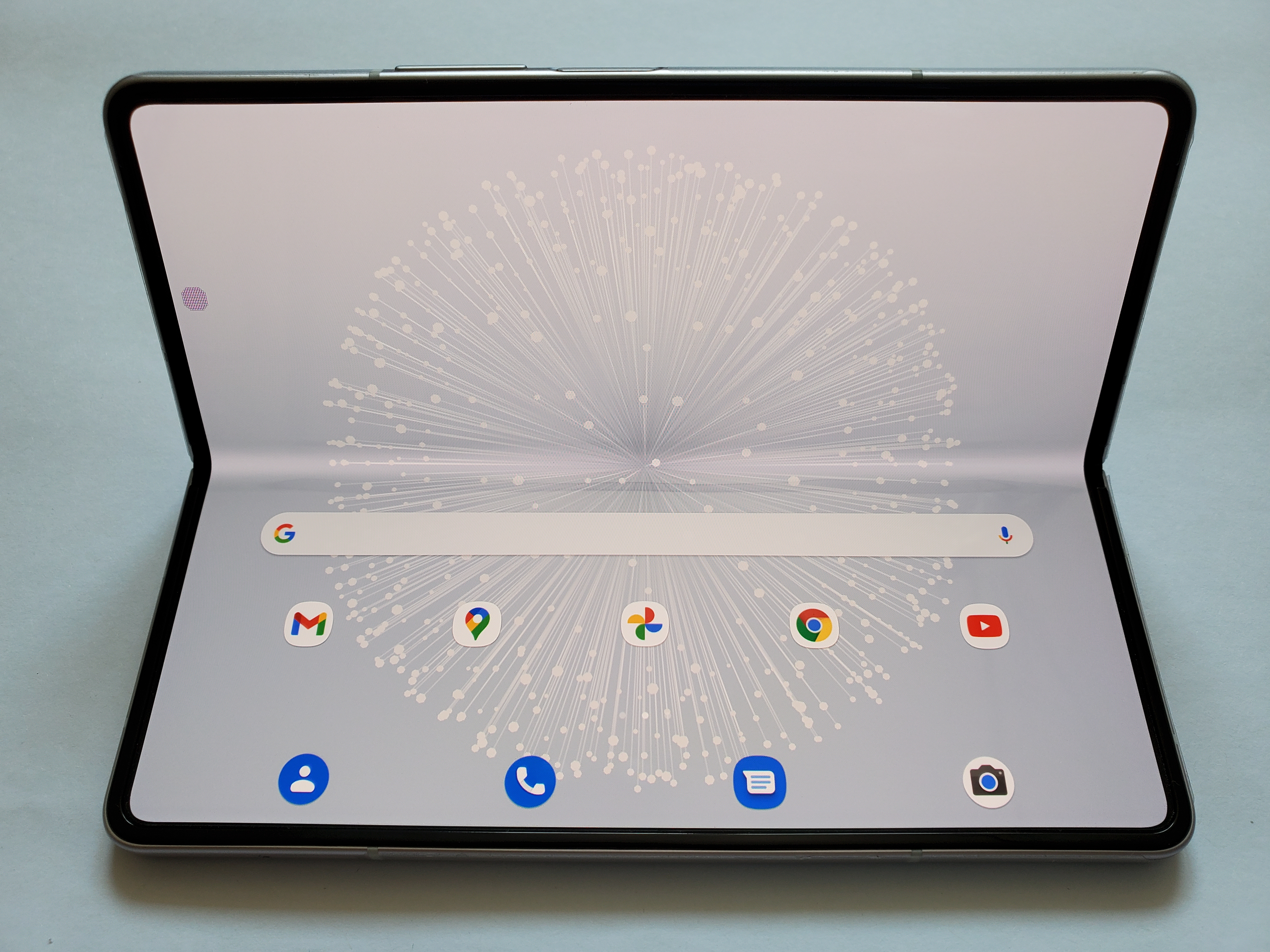
Samsung Galaxy Z Fold 3 (front)

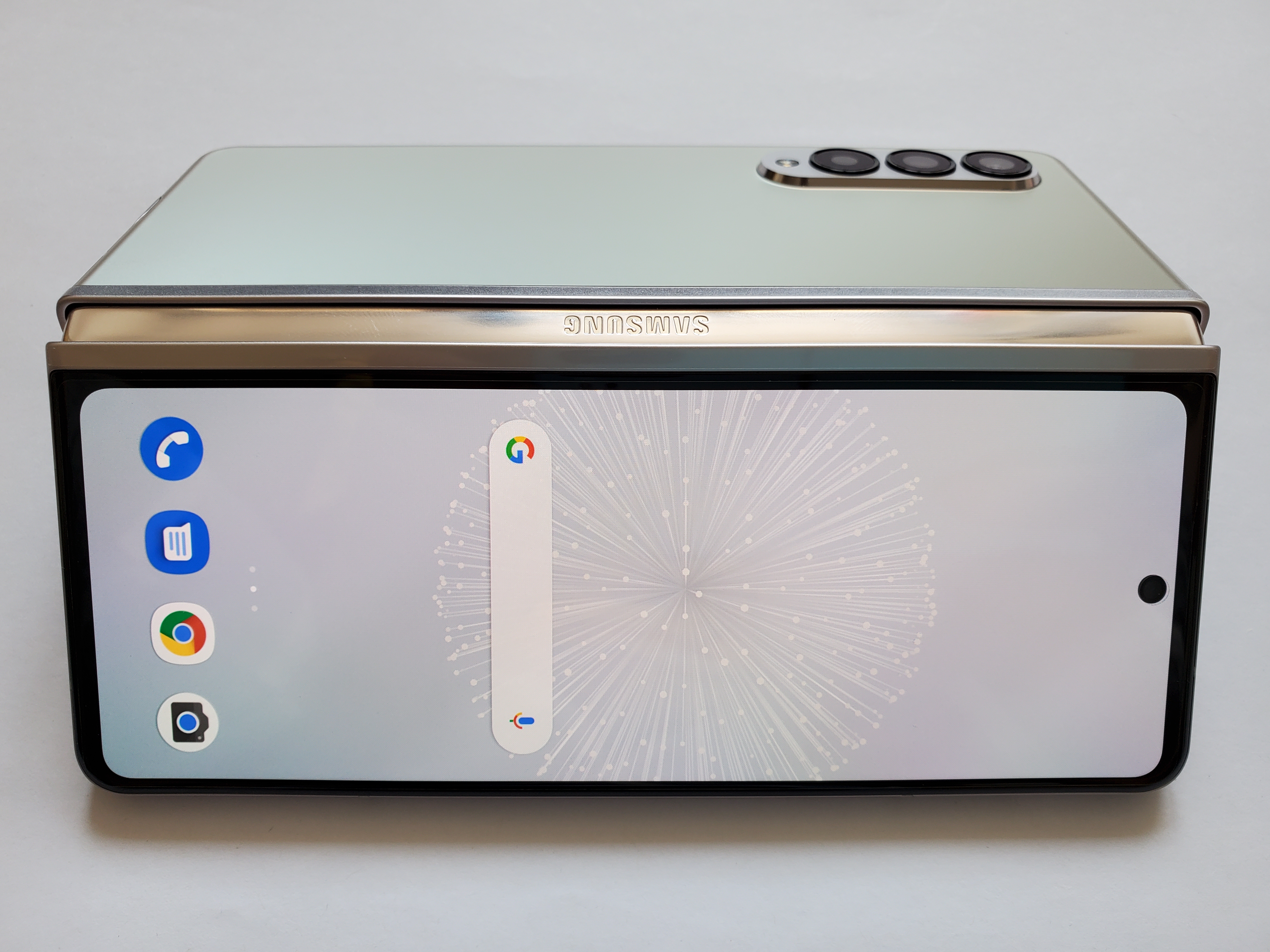
Samsung Galaxy Z Fold 3 (rear)

The Samsung Galaxy Z Fold 3 (stylized as Samsung Galaxy Z Fold3, sold as Samsung Galaxy Fold 3 in certain territories) is a foldable smartphone that is part of the Samsung Galaxy Z series. It was revealed by Samsung Electronics on August 11, 2021 at the Samsung Unpacked event alongside the Z Flip 3. It is the successor to the Samsung Galaxy Z Fold 2.

In March 2022, Samsung rebranded the device as "Galaxy Fold 3" in certain Eastern European territories, likely due to the Russian invasion of Ukraine and Russia's use of Z for military vehicles.

== Specifications ==
=== Design ===
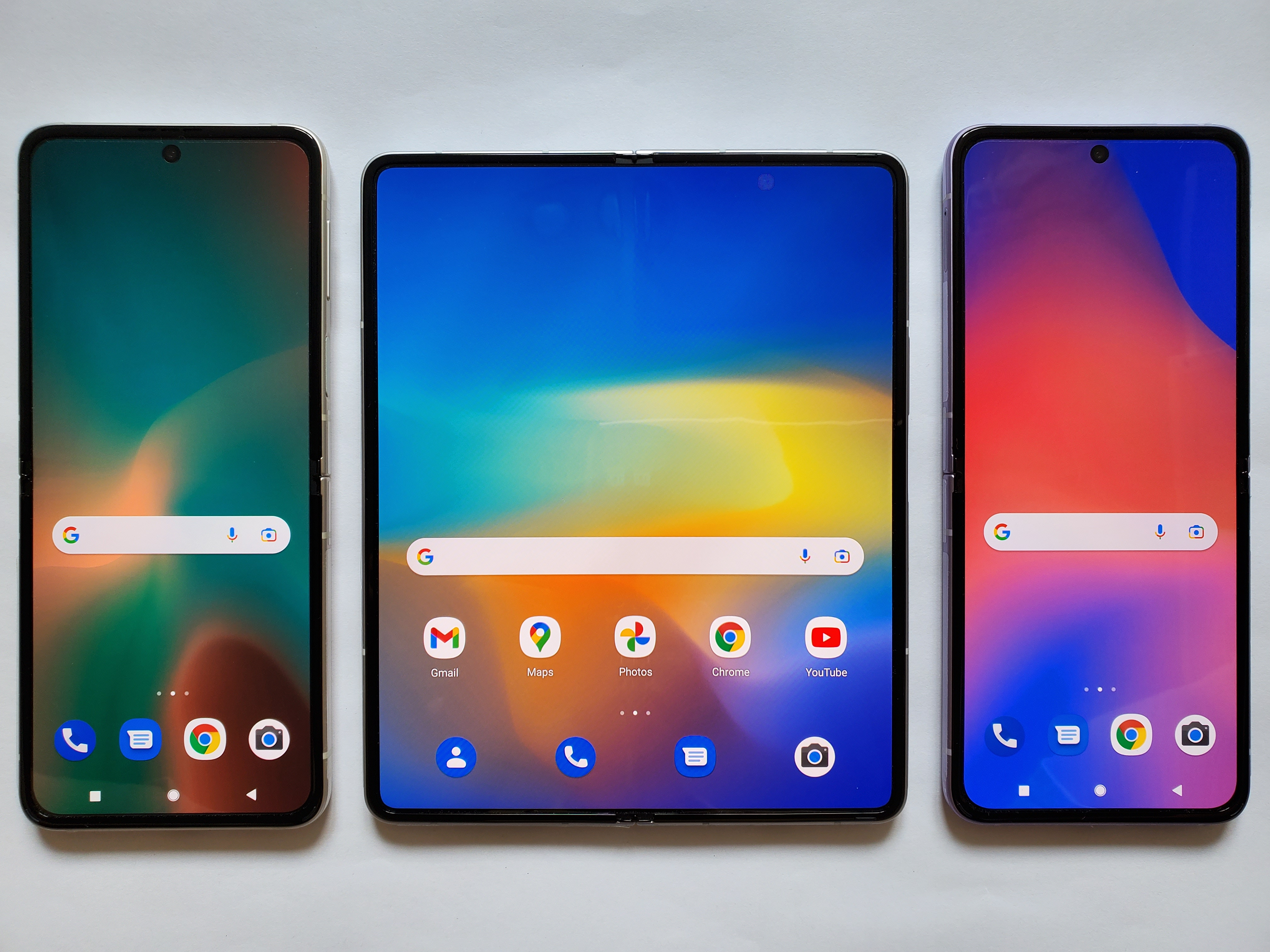
Samsung Galaxy Z Fold 3 & Z Flip 3

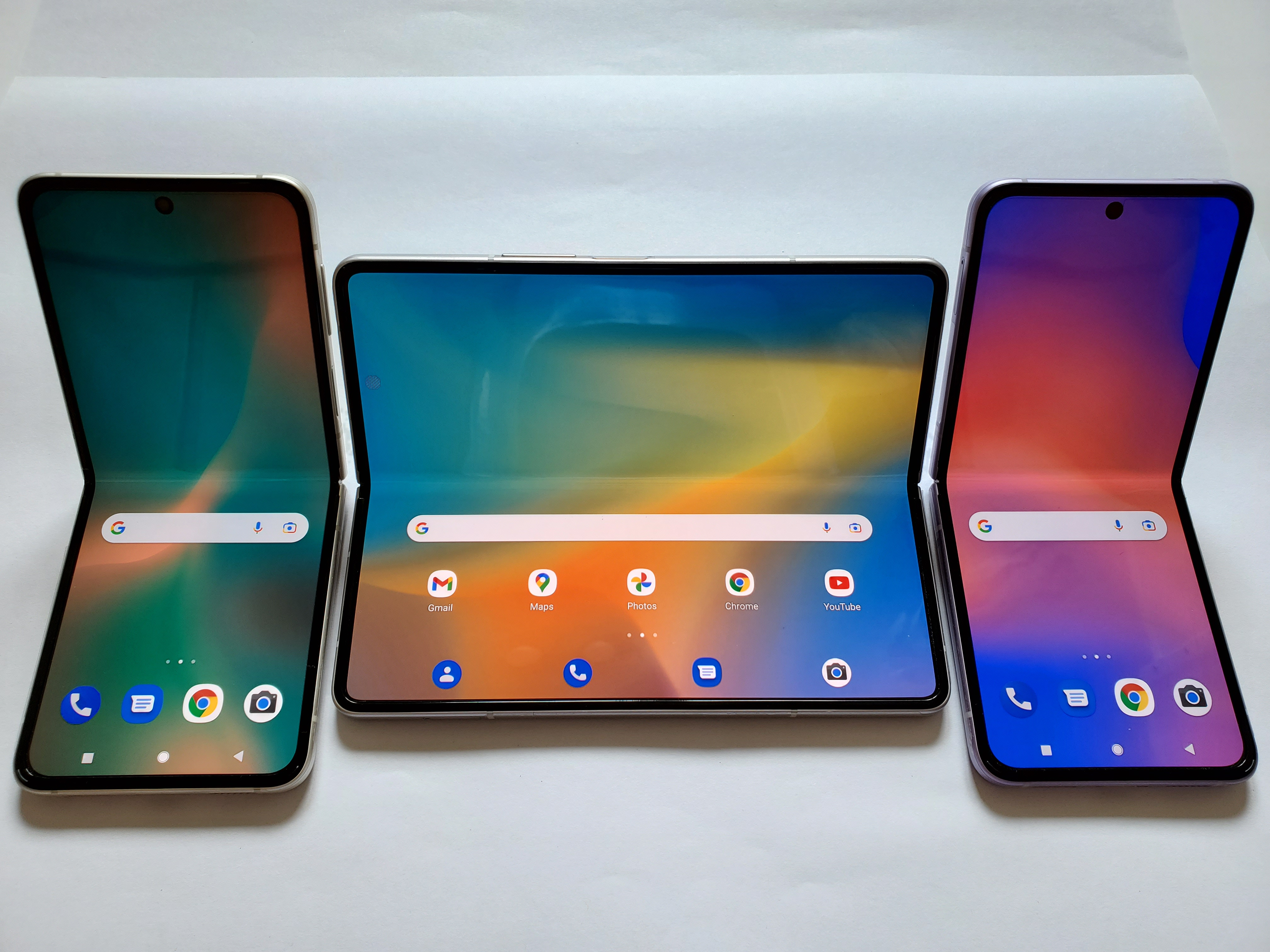
Samsung Galaxy Z Fold 3 & Z Flip 3

The Z Fold 3's outer display and back panel use Gorilla Glass Victus, whilst the foldable inner display is made of Samsung's proprietary "Ultra-Thin Glass" with two protective PET plastic layers covering it, the top of which is a replaceable screen protector.

The Z Fold 3 has an IPX8 ingress protection rating for water resistance up to and including full submersion for 30 minutes up to a maximum depth of 1.5 meters, with dust resistance not being rated. The outer frame is constructed from aluminum, marketed as 'Armor Frame' by Samsung, which is claimed to be 10% stronger than the Z Fold 2's aluminum frame.

=== Hardware ===
The Galaxy Z Fold 3 has two screens: its external cover screen which is a 6.23-inch 120 Hz display, and its foldable inner screen which is a 7.6-inch 120 Hz display featuring support for the S Pen Pro and the S Pen Fold Edition; both of which feature support for variable refresh rate to help maximize power efficiency.

While the inner display remained totally unchanged in its size and shape compared to the previous generation Z Fold 2, the external cover display was actually made ever so slightly wider by about +1 mm through a slight reduction in display bezel (making its aspect ratio ~24.5:9 vs the Fold 2's ~25:9), which as such also made it ever so slightly larger by about the same amount (~15.8 vs ~15.7 cm).

The device has 12 GB of RAM, and either 256 or 512 GB of UFS 3.1 flash storage, with no support for expanding the device's storage capacity via micro-SD cards.

The Z Fold 3 is powered by the Qualcomm Snapdragon 888, upgraded from the Z Fold 2's Qualcomm Snapdragon 865+.

The device's included battery is a 4400 mAh dual-cell that fast charges via a USB-C cable up to 25W, or via wireless charging up to 10W.

The Z Fold 3 features 3 rear cameras, including a 12 MP wide-angle camera, 12 MP ultra-wide camera, and a 12 MP telephoto camera, and features two front facing cameras, a 10 MP selfie camera on the outer display, and a 4 MP under-screen camera on the foldable inner display.

Samsung used to disable camera-related functions if the user attempted to unlock the bootloader. This behaviour was changed with newer updates.

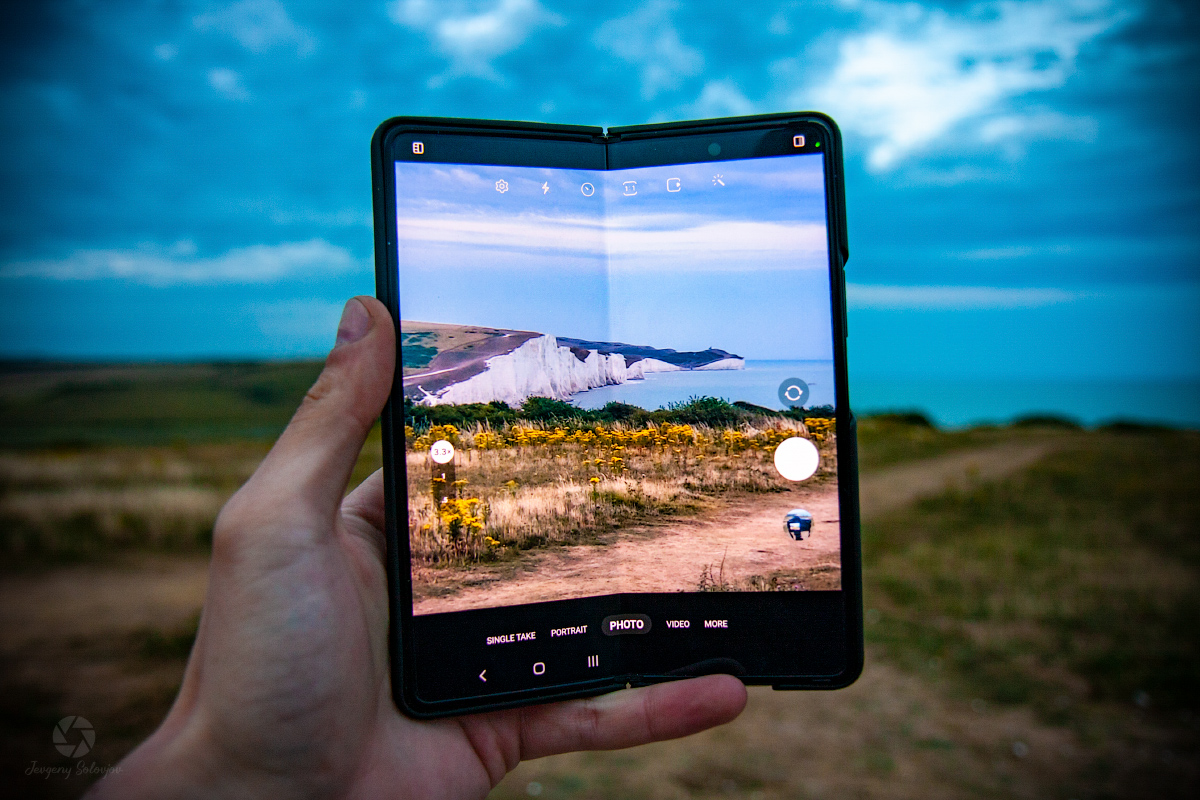
Samsung Galaxy Z Fold 3 (camera)

== See also ==
- Samsung Galaxy Z series
- Samsung Galaxy Z Flip 3

Preceded by Samsung Galaxy Z Fold 2	Samsung Galaxy Z Fold 3; 2021	Succeeded by Samsung Galaxy Z Fold 4
