= Samsung Galaxy Fit 2 =

2020 activity tracker by Samsung Electronics

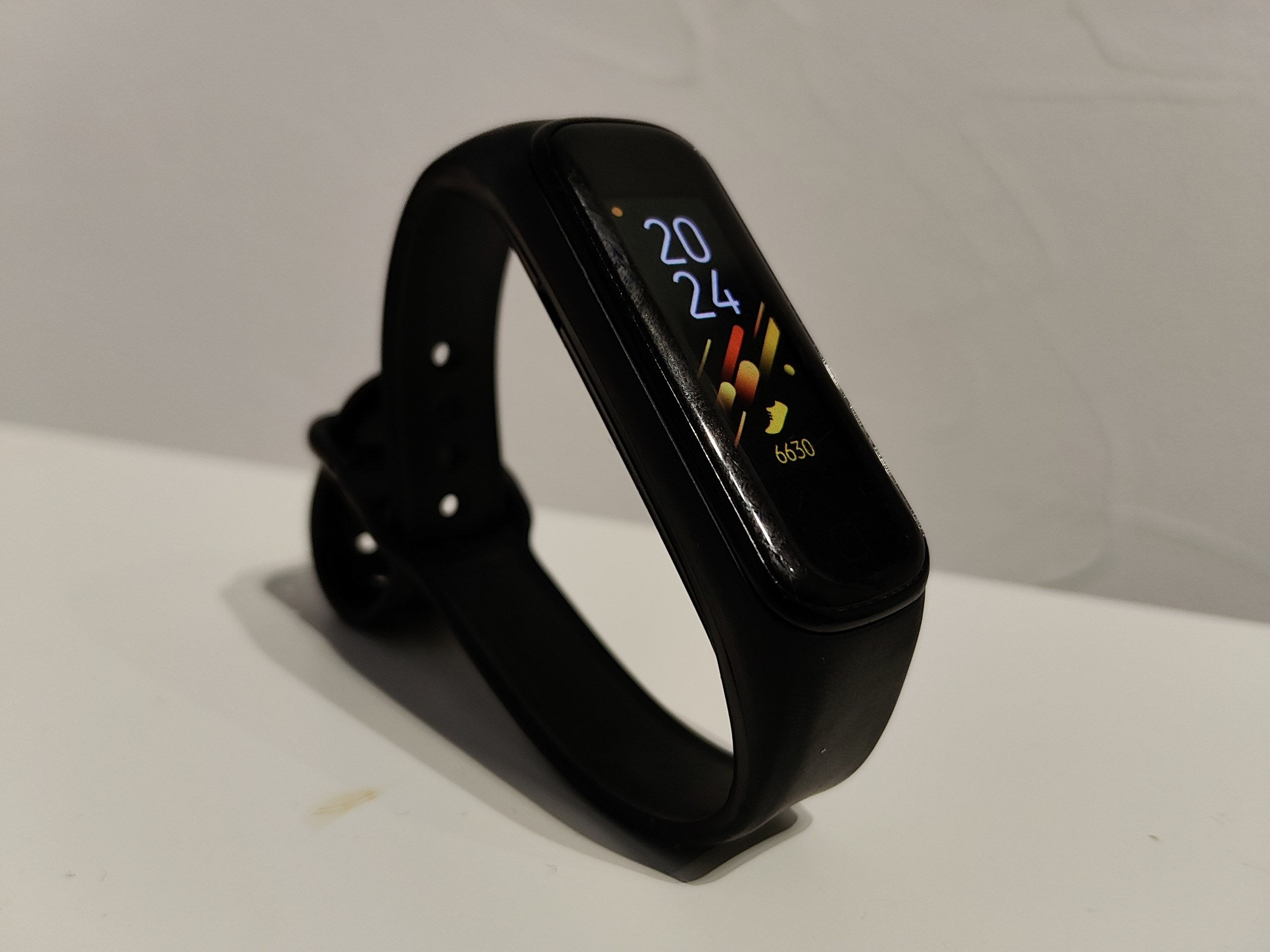
- Samsung Galaxy Fit 2
- Brand: Samsung
- Manufacturer: Samsung Electronics
- Type: Activity tracker
- Series: Galaxy Fit
- Family: Samsung Galaxy
- First released: October 2, 2020; 5 years ago
- Discontinued: July 10, 2024; 2 years ago
- Predecessor: Samsung Galaxy Fit
- Successor: Samsung Galaxy Fit 3
- Related: Samsung Galaxy Watch Active 2 Samsung Galaxy Watch 3
- Operating system: FreeRTOS
- Battery: 159 mAh

The Samsung Galaxy Fit 2 is an activity tracker manufactured, designed, developed, and marketed by Samsung Electronics. It was announced on September 1, 2020, at the Samsung's Galaxy Unpacked event, alongside the Galaxy Z Fold 2 full details announcement, and released on October 2, 2020.

== Software ==
The Galaxy Fit pairs through Bluetooth 5.1 with a smartphone running an OS newer than Android 5.0 or iOS 10.0. The pairing requires the installation of three applications and one plugin, which include the Galaxy Fit plugin, the Samsung Wearables app, Samsung Health, and Samsung Accessory Service. The watch runs on RTOS. It has various widgets for fitness, stress, and heartbeat tracking, although it did not have GPS connected with the phone when launched, a software update added this feature.
