= Samsung Galaxy Note 20 =

2020 Android phablets by Samsung Electronics

Samsung Galaxy Note 20 series

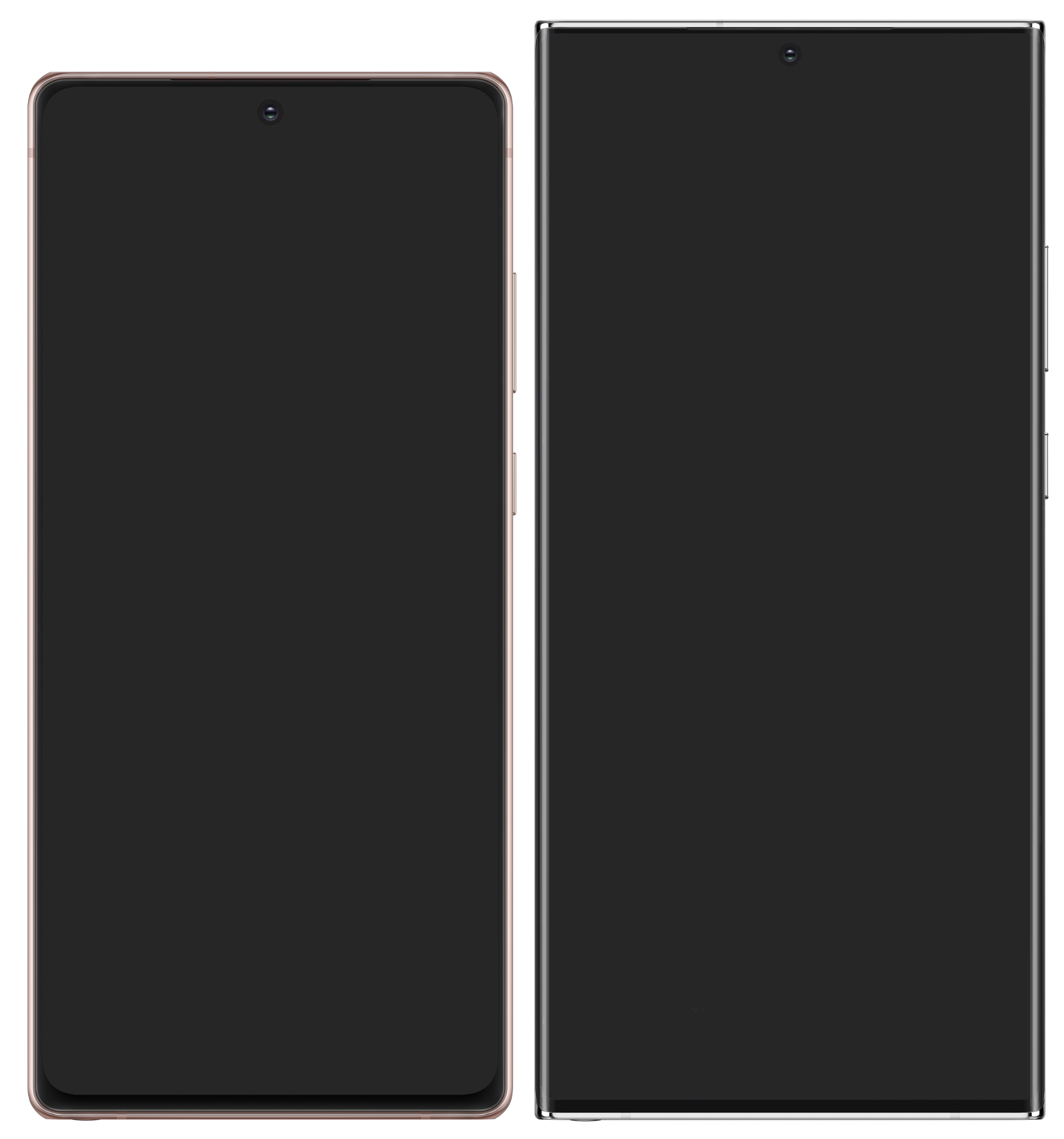
- Left: Galaxy Note 20; Right: Galaxy Note 20 Ultra
- Brand: Samsung
- Manufacturer: Samsung Electronics
- Type: Smartphone
- Series: Galaxy Note
- Family: Samsung Galaxy
- First released: August 5, 2020; 6 years ago
- Availability by region: August 21, 2020; 6 years ago
- Discontinued: December 2021; 4 years ago
- Predecessor: Samsung Galaxy Note 10
- Successor: Samsung Galaxy S21 Ultra (indirect); Samsung Galaxy Z Fold 3 (indirect); Samsung Galaxy S22 Ultra (direct)
- Related: Samsung Galaxy S20; Samsung Galaxy Z Flip; Samsung Galaxy Z Fold 2 Samsung Galaxy S20 FE
- Compatible networks: 2G, 3G, 4G, 4G LTE, 5G
- Form factor: Slate
- Dimensions: Note 20: 161.6 mm × 75.2 mm × 8.3 mm (6.36 in × 2.96 in × 0.33 in); Note 20 Ultra: 164.8 mm × 77.2 mm × 8.1 mm (6.49 in × 3.04 in × 0.32 in)
- Weight: Note 20: 192–194 g (6.8–6.8 oz); Note 20 Ultra: 208 g (7.3 oz)
- Operating system: Original: Android 10 with One UI 2.5; Final: Android 13 with One UI 5.1
- System-on-chip: Europe, Middle East, Asia Pacific (Except East Asia), and Brazil: Samsung Exynos 990; East Asia (Greater China, South Korea, Japan), North America and Latin America (Except Brazil): Qualcomm Snapdragon 865+
- CPU: Exynos: Octa-core (2x2.73 GHz Mongoose M5 & 2x2.50 GHz Cortex-A76 & 4x2.0 GHz Cortex-A55; Snapdragon: Octa-core (1x3.09 GHz Kryo 585 & 3x2.42 GHz Kryo 585 & 4x1.8 GHz Kryo 585)
- GPU: Exynos: Mali-G77 MP11; Snapdragon: Adreno 650
- Memory: 8 or 12 GB LPDDR5-5500 RAM
- Storage: 128, 256 or 512 GB UFS 3.1
- Removable storage: Note 20: None; Note 20 Ultra: microSDXC, expandable up to 1 TB
- SIM: nanoSIM, eSIM; Single SIM or Hybrid Dual SIM in dual stand-by
- Battery: Non-removable; Note 20: 4300 mAh; Note 20 Ultra: 4500 mAh
- Charging: Supports Fast Charging at 25W; Fast Qi/PMA wireless charging Reverse wireless charging at 4.5W; USB Power Delivery 3.0
- Rear camera: Note 20: 12 MP, ƒ/1.8, 26 mm, 1/1.76", 1.8 μm (wide) + 64 MP, ƒ/2.0, 1/1.72", 0.8 μm (telephoto) + 12 MP, ƒ/2.2, 13 mm, 1/2.55", 1.4 μm (ultrawide) Dual Pixel PDAF, 3× optical zoom, 30× hybrid zoom (optical and digital zoom combined); Note 20 Ultra: 108 MP, ƒ/1.8, 26 mm, 0.8 μm, 1/1.33" (wide) + 12 MP, ƒ/3.0, 103 mm, 1/3.4" (telephoto) + 12 MP, ƒ/2.2, 13 mm, 1.4 μm, 1/2.55" (ultrawide) PDAF, Laser AF, 5× optical zoom; Both: 8K@24fps, 4K@30/60fps, 1080p@30/60/240fps, 720p@960fps, HDR10+, stereo sound recording, gyro-EIS & OIS, LED flash, auto-HDR, panorama
- Front camera: 10 MP, ƒ/2.2, 26 mm (wide), 1/3.2", 1.22 μm 4K@30/60fps, 1080p@30fps Dual video call, Auto-HDR
- Display: Note 20: 6.7 in (170 mm) Super AMOLED Plus capacitive touchscreen, 2400 × 1080 1080p (2.5 MP), (393 ppi), 60 Hz refresh rate, Gorilla Glass 5; Note 20 Ultra: 6.9 in (175 mm) Dynamic AMOLED 2X capacitive touchscreen, 3088 × 1440 1440p, (495 ppi), 120 Hz refresh rate on 1080p resolution, Gorilla Glass Victus; Both: 16M colours, HDR10+
- External display: Always on Display
- Sound: 32-bit/384kHz stereo speakers tuned by AKG
- Connectivity: GSM/CDMA/HSPA/EVDO/LTE/5G, WLAN, 802.11 a/b/g/n/ac/ax, dual band, Wi-Fi Direct & Hotspot, Bluetooth 5.0, A2DP, LE & aptX, A-GPS, GLONASS, BDS & GALILEO, NFC, USB 3.2, Type-C 1.0 reversible connector, USB On-The-Go
- Data inputs: S Pen; Fingerprint sensor (under display, ultrasonic); Accelerometer; Gyroscope; Proximity sensor; Compass; Barometer; ANT+; Samsung DeX; Bixby
- Water resistance: IP68, up to 1.5 m (4.9 ft) for 30 minutes
- Model: International models: SM-N980x (Note 20 LTE); SM-N981x (Note 20 5G); SM-N985x (Note 20 Ultra LTE); SM-N986x (Note 20 Ultra 5G) (Last letter varies by carrier and international models); Japanese models: SCG06 (au, Note 20 Ultra 5G); SC-53A (NTT Docomo, Note 20 Ultra 5G)
- Codename: Canvas, c1, c2
- Other: Samsung Galaxy S20
- Website: www.samsung.com/global/galaxy/galaxy-note20/

The Samsung Galaxy Note 20 (stylized and marketed as Samsung Galaxy Note20 and Galaxy Note20 Ultra) is a series of Android-based smartphones developed, produced, and marketed by Samsung Electronics as part of their Galaxy Note series, succeeding the Galaxy Note 10 series. The devices were announced on 5 August 2020 alongside the Galaxy Z Fold 2, Galaxy Watch 3, Galaxy Buds Live and Galaxy Tab S7 during Samsung's Unpacked Event.

The Galaxy Note 20 was the final model in the Galaxy Note series, with Samsung beginning to integrate the functionality from the Note series into its Z series and S series "Ultra" models starting in 2021. While the S21 Ultra and Z Fold series support S-Pen input, the S-Pen is not included in packaging since there's no dedicated slot to put the pen inside, making the S-Pen available as an optional accessory for these devices. Beginning with the S22 Ultra, Samsung re-introduced the S-Pen and the dedicated slot only for its S Ultra models. Note 20 devices were unveiled virtually at Samsung's newsroom in Suwon, South Korea. At the event, Samsung announced that the smartphones include support for 5G connectivity, which allows for higher-bandwidth and lower-latency mobile connections where 5G network coverage is available. The Note 20's S-Pen has up to 4× better latency than that of previous generations. Mystic Green, Mystic Bronze, and Mystic Grey are colour options for the Note 20; Mystic Bronze, Mystic Black and Mystic White are colour options for the Note 20 Ultra. Unlike its predecessor, the Note 20 range does not feature a "+" model.

The Galaxy Note 20 series also include a number of new software features, which include performance optimization for mobile gaming, wireless sync with desktop and laptop PCs, and improved DeX features for remotely connected to compatible devices.

== Design ==
The Galaxy Note 20 series maintains a similar design with the Galaxy Note 10 and Galaxy S20, with an Infinity-O display (first introduced on the Galaxy S10) containing a circular punch hole in the top center for the frontal selfie camera. The rear camera array is located in the corner with a rectangular protrusion like the Galaxy S20, housing three cameras.

Unlike their predecessors, the Note 20 Ultra is the first Samsung phone that uses stainless steel as the frame material, while the regular Note 20 sticks to the more classic anodized aluminum. The Note 20 uses Gorilla Glass 5 for the screen; the back panel is reinforced polycarbonate, which has not been seen on a Note series phone since the Note 4, Note Edge with the exception of the Note 10 Lite. It is also the only Galaxy Note lineup to fully omit a 3.5mm headphone jack. The Note 20 Ultra has Gorilla Glass Victus for the screen. Global color options are, Mystic Bronze, Mystic Grey, Mystic Green, Mystic Black and Mystic White. Moreover, the Mystic Green, Mystic Bronze and Mystic Grey color options on the Note 20, have a matte finish, whereas, only the Mystic Bronze on the Note 20 Ultra, has a matte finish. Mystic Bronze is available on both models, whereas Mystic Grey and Mystic Green, are limited to the Note 20; Mystic Black and Mystic Crush White are limited to the Note 20 Ultra. For the Note 20, Aura Red is exclusive to SK Telecom with 256 GB of storage, replacing Mystic Green in South Korea; Prism Blue was sold in India.

== Specifications ==
=== Hardware ===
==== Chipsets ====
The Galaxy Note 20 line comprises two models with various hardware specifications; international models of the Note 20 utilize the Exynos 990 system-on-chip, while the United States, Korean and Chinese models utilize the Qualcomm Snapdragon 865+. Both of the SoCs are based on a 7 nm+ processing technology node. The Exynos chipset comes with the Mali-G77 MP11 GPU, whereas the Snapdragon chipset comes with the Adreno 650 GPU.

==== Display ====
The Galaxy Note 20 does not feature a curved display like the one found on the Note 20 Ultra. The Note 20 and Note 20 Ultra feature a 6.7-inch 1080p and 6.9-inch 1440p display, respectively. Both use an AMOLED with HDR10+ support and "dynamic tone mapping" technology, marketed as Super AMOLED Plus for the Note 20 and Dynamic AMOLED 2X for the Note 20 Ultra. The Note 20 has a fixed 60 Hz refresh rate, however, the Note 20 Ultra offers a variable 120 Hz refresh rate. The settings have two options, 60 Hz and Adaptive, the latter of which uses a variable refresh rate that can adjust based on the content being displayed, enabled by a more energy efficient LTPO backplane. Unlike the S20 series, the display will remain at 120 Hz regardless of the device's battery level, and can handle slightly higher temperatures before switching to 60 Hz. Adaptive mode is limited to a FHD resolution, requiring users to switch to 60 Hz mode to enable QHD resolution. Both models utilize an ultrasonic in-screen fingerprint sensor.

==== Storage ====
The base amount of RAM is 8 GB, paired with 128 or 256 GB of internal storage standard. The Note 20 Ultra has 12 GB RAM and 512 GB UFS options, and has up to 1 TB of expandable storage via the microSD card slot.

==== Batteries ====
The Note 20 and Note 20 Ultra use non-removable Li-Ion batteries, rated at 4300 mAh and 4500 mAh respectively.

Qi inductive charging is supported as well as the ability to charge other Qi-compatible device from the Note 20's own battery power, which is branded as "Samsung PowerShare"; wired charging is supported over USB-C at up to 25 W.

==== Connectivity ====
The two come with 5G standard connectivity, though some regions may have special LTE or sub-6 GHz only variants, and both omit the audio jack.

It has NFC, eSIM, and Ultra-wideband technology.

On April 14, 2021, the Galaxy Note 20 Ultra 5G T-Mobile updated software to support eSIM and dual SIM (DSDS). Other carriers still do not enable the two features even though the Galaxy Note20 Ultra already supports eSIM out of the box.

==== Cameras ====
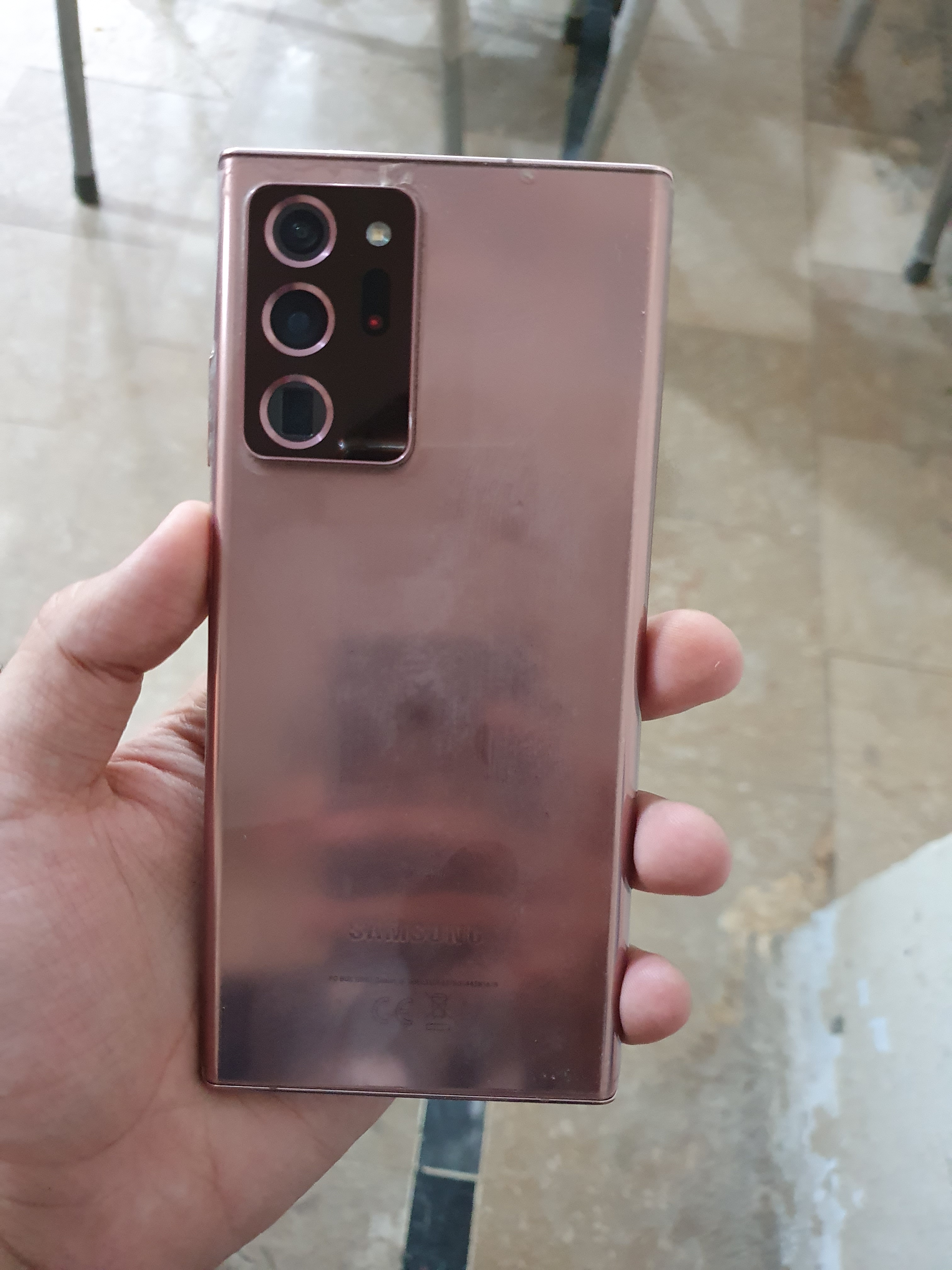
Back of Note 20 Ultra Mystic Bronze

The Note 20 features similar camera specifications to that of the Samsung Galaxy S20, which include a 12 MP wide sensor with f/1.8 aperture, a 64 MP telephoto sensor with f/2.0 aperture, and a 12 MP ultrawide sensor with 12 mm equivalent focal length. The telephoto camera supports 3× hybrid optical zoom and 10× digital zoom, which combined enables 30× hybrid zoom.

The Note 20 Ultra has a more advanced camera setup than its counterpart, including a 108 MP wide sensor, a 12 MP "periscope" telephoto sensor, and a 12 MP ultrawide sensor. The telephoto camera has a focal length of 120 mm (35mm equivalent), which equals 5× optical zoom, and allows for 50× hybrid zoom (assisted by digital zoom). Laser autofocus is used in favor of the S20 Ultra's time-of-flight camera.

The Note 20's telephoto sensor and the Note 20 Ultra's wide sensor use pixel binning to output higher quality images at a standard resolution, with the wide-angle sensor using Nonacell technology which groups 3x3 pixels to capture more light.

The front camera uses a 10 MP sensor, and can record 4K video.

Single Take, introduced on the S20 series, allows users to capture photos or videos simultaneously with different sensors automatically. Both models can record 8K video at 24fps. On the Note 20, this is enabled by the 64 MP telephoto sensor, whereas the Note 20 Ultra's 108 MP wide sensor natively supports 8K video.

==== S Pen ====
The S Pen has better latency at 26ms on the Note 20 and 9ms on the Note 20 Ultra, reduced from 42ms on the Note 10 and Note 10+. Additionally, it gains five new Air gestures that work across the UI by utilizing the accelerometers and gyroscope, as well as 'AI-based point prediction'. Battery life has also been improved from 10 hours to 24 hours.

==== Accessories ====
Earbuds are included in some countries such as in Europe, the Middle East, Asia and Africa, but are not bundled in others such as the US.

=== Software ===
The devices were shipped with Android 10 and One UI 2.5. They receive 3 years of Android OS upgrades and 4 years of security updates. A beta test for Android 11 was released later on in the year. Android 11 with One UI 3.0 was sent OTA (over-the-air) to the majority of Note 20 and Note 20 Ultra devices by January 2021. Both the Note 20 and Note 20 Ultra received the Android 12 update with One UI 4.0 by January 2022. As of May 2024, the Note 20 and Note 20 Ultra received their last major upgrade, One UI 5.1, based on Android 13; Android 14 with One UI 6 and later versions of Android and One UI can be installed via custom mods. Samsung would later gradually extend support for the Galaxy S20 and Note 20 for a 5th year in 2024, moving from monthly to quarterly.

On September 9, 2025, support for the Galaxy Note 20 series ceased, with Android 13 and One UI 5.1 being the final OS update and the August 2025 security patch level as the final security update.

	Pre-installed OS	OS Upgrades history			End of support
	Pre-installed OS	1st	2nd	3rd	End of support
Note 20; Note 20 Ultra	Android 10 (One UI 2.5)	Android 11 (One UI 3.0); December 2020 (One UI 3.1); February 2021	Android 12 (One UI 4.0); December 2021 (One UI 4.1); March 2022	Android 13 (One UI 5.0); November 2022 (One UI 5.1); February 2023	September 2025

==== Xbox Game Pass ====
Samsung partnered with Xbox to offer Xbox games on the Note 20. In certain markets, the Galaxy Note 20 has been offered with three months of free Xbox game pass along with an Xbox game pad; Xbox games will be playable from the phone to the TV. More than 90 Xbox games are playable on the Note 20.

== Reception ==
The Note 20 received mixed reviews. Reviews from various technology websites, such as TechRadar and The Verge, praised the Note 20 series for its redesigned S-Pen and camera performance. However, the baseline Note 20 was criticized for its lower quality display and plastic back panel despite the high starting price point. Writing for TechRadar, James Peckham said in his verdict, "the Galaxy Note 20 is Samsung's new entry-level stylus-included smartphone for 2020, but it's one that doesn't seem particularly exciting for the usual Note-loving crowd. It highlights some more affordable features compared to its more exciting Ultra sibling but it may well be just as good for those who don't want to spend top dollar." There was a pronounced difference in the performance of the two processors available, which caused concern that Exynos models were an inferior product, as the differentials were not as large in previous models. The cooling system introduced in the Galaxy Note 10 was also removed in the Snapdragon Variants of the Note 20 series.

== See also ==
- Samsung Galaxy S20
- Samsung Galaxy Z Flip
- Samsung Galaxy Z Fold 2
- Samsung Galaxy Note series

== Notes ==
Preceded by Samsung Galaxy Note 10	Samsung Galaxy Note 20; 2020	Succeeded by Samsung Galaxy S22 Ultra
