= Samsung Galaxy Note 10 =

2019 flagship phablet by Samsung Electronics

Samsung Galaxy Note 10 series

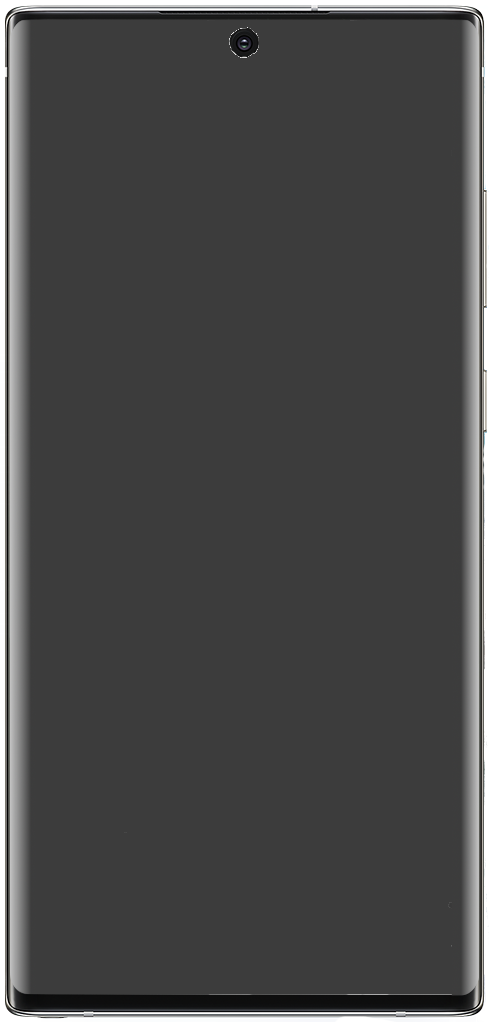
- Galaxy Note 10 (front)
- Brand: Samsung
- Manufacturer: Samsung Electronics
- Type: Smartphone
- Series: Galaxy Note
- Family: Samsung Galaxy
- First released: Note 10 and Note 10+: August 7, 2019; 7 years ago Note 10 Lite: January 3, 2020; 6 years ago
- Availability by region: Note 10 and Note 10+: August 23, 2019; 7 years ago Note 10 Lite: January 20, 2020; 6 years ago
- Discontinued: December 2021
- Predecessor: Samsung Galaxy Note 9 Samsung Galaxy Note 3 Neo (direct for Note 10 Lite); Samsung Galaxy Note FE (indirect for Note 10 Lite)
- Successor: Samsung Galaxy Note 20; Samsung Galaxy S20 FE (for Note 10 Lite)
- Related: Samsung Galaxy S10; Samsung Galaxy Fold
- Compatible networks: 2G / 3G / 4G / 4G LTE; 5G (Note 10 5G & Note 10+ 5G)
- Form factor: Slate
- Dimensions: Note 10: 151 mm × 71.8 mm × 7.9 mm (5.94 in × 2.83 in × 0.31 in); Note 10+: 162.3 mm × 77.2 mm × 7.9 mm (6.39 in × 3.04 in × 0.31 in); Note 10 Lite: 163.7 mm × 76.1 mm × 8.7 mm (6.44 in × 3.00 in × 0.34 in)
- Weight: Note 10: 170 g (5.9 oz); Note 10+: 198 g (6.98 oz); Note 10 Lite: 199 g (7.02 oz)
- Operating system: Original (Note 10 and Note 10+): Android 9 "Pie" with One UI 1.5; Original (Note 10 Lite): Android 10 with One UI 2.0; Current (Note 10 and Note 10+): Android 12 with One UI 4.1; Current (Note 10 Lite): Android 13 with One UI 5.1
- System-on-chip: Worldwide: Samsung Exynos 9 Series 9825; U.S., Canada, Hong Kong, China, Japan and Latin America (Except Brazil): Qualcomm Snapdragon 855; Note 10 Lite: Samsung Exynos 9 Series 9810
- CPU: Octa-core; Exynos 9825: 2*2.73 GHz Mongoose M4 2*2.4 GHz Cortex-A75 4*1.9 GHz Cortex-A55; Snapdragon: 1*2.8 GHz Kryo 485 3*2.4 GHz Kryo 485 4*1.7 GHz Kryo 485; Exynos 9810: 4*2.7 GHz Mongoose M3 4*1.7 GHz Cortex-A55
- GPU: Exynos 9825: Mali-G76 MP12; Snapdragon: Adreno 640; Exynos 9810: Mali-G72 MP18
- Modem: Qualcomm Snapdragon X16 LTE MDM
- Memory: Note 10: 8 GB/12 GB RAM; Note 10+: 12 GB RAM; Note 10 Lite: 6 GB/8 GB RAM
- Storage: Note 10: 256 GB UFS 3.0; Note 10+: 256 GB/512 GB UFS 3.0; Note 10 Lite: 128 GB UFS 2.1
- Removable storage: Note 10: none Note 10+: microSD card support up to 1 TB; Note 10 Lite: microSD card support up to 1 TB
- SIM: nanoSIM, eSIM; Single SIM or Hybrid Dual SIM in dual stand-by
- Battery: Note 10: 3500 mAh; Note 10+: 4300 mAh; Note 10 Lite: 4500 mAh
- Charging: Note 10 and Note 10 Lite: Fast charging up to 25W; Note 10+: Fast charging up to 45W; Qi & reverse wireless charging (excluding Note 10 Lite)
- Rear camera: Note 10 and Note 10+: Primary: 12 MP, f/1.5-2.4, 27mm, 1/2.55", 1.4µm, dual pixel PDAF, OIS Telephoto: 12 MP, f/2.1, 52mm, 1/3.6", 1.0µm, PDAF, OIS, 2x optical zoom Ultrawide: 16 MP, f/2.2, 12mm, 1/3.1", 1.0µm, Super Steady video VGA DepthVision (Note 10+); Note 10 Lite: Primary: 12 MP, f/1.7, 27mm, 1/2.55", 1.4µm, dual pixel PDAF, OIS Telephoto: 12 MP, f/2.4, 52mm, 1/3.6", 1.0µm, PDAF, OIS, 2x optical zoom Ultrawide: 12 MP, f/2.2, 12mm
- Front camera: Note 10 & Note 10+: 10 MP, f/2.2, 26mm (wide), 1/3", 1.22µm, dual pixel PDAF; Note 10 Lite: 32 MP, f/2.2, 25mm (wide), 1/2.8", 0.8µm
- Display: Note 10: 2280×1080 1080p Dynamic AMOLED Gorilla Glass 6 6.3 in (160.0 mm), (401 ppi); Note 10+: 3040×1440 1440p Dynamic AMOLED Gorilla Glass 6 6.8 in (172.7 mm), (498 ppi); Note 10 Lite: 2400×1080 1080p Super AMOLED Gorilla Glass 3 1080p 6.7 in (170.2 mm), (394 ppi); All: capacitive touchscreen HDR10+ Infinity-O display
- Sound: Dolby Atmos stereo speaker tuned by AKG
- Connectivity: Bluetooth 5.0; Wi-Fi b/g/n/ac/ax
- Data inputs: Sensors: Accelerometer; Barometer; Ultrasonic Fingerprint scanner; Pressure sensor; Magnetometer; Gyroscope; Hall sensor; Proximity sensor; RGB Light sensor; Other: Physical sound volume keys; USB-C charging/audio port; S Pen
- Water resistance: IP68, up to 1.5 m (4.9 ft) for 30 minutes (excluding Note 10 Lite)
- Model: International models: SM-N970x (Note 10)<>SM-N971x (Note 10 5G) SM-N975x (Note 10+) SM-N976x (Note 10+ 5G)<>SM-N770x (Note 10 Lite) (Last letter varies by carrier and international models); Japanese models: SCV45/SM-N975J (au, Note 10+) SC-01M/SM-N975D (NTT Docomo, Note 10+) SM-N975C (Rakuten Mobile, Note 10+)
- Codename: Da Vinci
- Other: Samsung Galaxy S10
- Website: www.samsung.com/global/galaxy/galaxy-note10/

The Samsung Galaxy Note 10 (stylized as Samsung Galaxy Note10) is a series of Android-based smartphones manufactured, developed, produced, and marketed by Samsung Electronics as part of the Galaxy Note series. The basic & plus models were unveiled at Samsung's Galaxy Unpacked event on August 7, 2019, as successors to the Samsung Galaxy Note 9, alongside the Galaxy Watch Active 2 and the Galaxy Book S. Details about the phablets were widely leaked in the months leading up to the phablets' announcement.

On January 3, 2020, Samsung unveiled a mid-range variant, the Galaxy Note 10 Lite, which was introduced with lesser specifications and features, alongside the Galaxy S10 Lite.

On August 5, 2020, the Galaxy Note 10 series was succeeded by the Galaxy Note 20 series.

Starting with this release, a 5G version is also available, with its predecessor being the last Galaxy Note model to be released with 4G connectivity only.

== Specifications ==
=== Hardware ===
==== Displays ====
The Galaxy Note 10 line comprises two models with various hardware specifications; The Note 10 and Note 10 5G feature 6.3-inch 1080p (Note 10+ / Note 10+ 5G feature 6.8-inch 1440p) “Dynamic AMOLED” displays with HDR10+ support and “dynamic tone mapping” technology respectively. The displays have curved sides that slope over the horizontal edges of the device. The phablet also features a 19:9 aspect ratio. The front-facing cameras occupy a rounded cut-out on the top of the display, and all models utilize an ultrasonic in-screen fingerprint reader.

==== Storage and chipsets ====
International models of the Note 10 utilize the Exynos 9825 system-on-chip, while the U.S., Canadian, Chinese and Japanese models utilize the Qualcomm Snapdragon 855. All models are sold with 256 GB of internal Universal Flash Storage 3.0, with the Note 10+ & Note 10+ 5G also being sold in a 512 GB model and offering expandable storage via a microSD card.

==== Batteries ====
They respectively contain non-user-replaceable 3500 and 4300 mAh Lithium-ion batteries, with both variants supporting 25W Super Fast Charging, while the Note 10+ also supports 45W Super Fast Charging 2.0, Qi inductive charging, and the ability to charge other Qi-compatible devices from their battery power.

The device is compatible with USB PD 3.0.

==== Exterior ====
The Note 10 and Note 10+ are the first mainstream Samsung smartphones to omit the 3.5 mm headphone jack, which earned Samsung criticism for mocking the iPhone 7's lack of the headphone jack on the Galaxy Note 7 UNPACKED keynote in August 2016 – Samsung said it used the extra space for more battery. The sleep/wake power button that used to be on the right side of the phone has been removed, consolidated with the Bixby button on the left side of the phone. New settings have been added that allow the button to be remapped as either a power button or a Bixby button. This was the second time Samsung removed the heart rate sensor after the Galaxy S10e and S10 5G because it was rarely used by users. For the first time in Samsung's devices since the original Galaxy S (2010), the camera has been placed into the corner, similar to the iPhone X/XS/XR/11 series.

On January 20, 2020, the Note 10 Lite was released. It is a mid-range variant of the Note 10, containing the same cameras as the main variant. It features 128 GB of storage, a 6.7-inch 1080p “Super AMOLED” screen on a metallic frame, a 4,500 mAh battery and is powered by the Exynos 9810. The variant eliminates the wireless charging feature and stereo speakers, though it retains the 25W Super Fast Charging of the main series, and also has a headphone jack. However, the Note 10 Lite lacks a barometer sensor, which has been present on Samsung Galaxy flagships since 2012.

==== Cameras ====
The Note 10 series features a multi-lens rear-facing camera setup with Samsung's Scene Optimizer technology. It houses a dual-aperture 12 MP wide-angle lens, a 12 MP telephoto lens and a 16 MP ultra-wide-angle lens, with the Note 10+/ Note 10+ 5G having an additional VGA Depth Vision Camera allowing for 3D AR mapping. The front-facing camera on all models consists of a 10 MP punch hole lens in the top center of the display. The camera software includes a new “Shot Suggestion” feature to assist users, “Artistic Live Filters”, as well as the ability to post directly to Instagram posts and stories. It also contains the “Scene Optimizer” feature from previous Samsung phones that automatically adjusts the camera settings based on different scenes. Both sets of cameras support 4K@60fps video recording and HDR10+ with more advanced video stabilization. There is also Live Focus Video, enabling users to capture Bokeh backgrounds in video, much like with Portrait Mode.

==== S Pen ====
The S Pen has also undergone notable changes compared to the Galaxy Note 9. The pen is a single piece of plastic, instead of two like Note 9, and supports more advanced Air Actions that allow users to control the phablet remotely with the pen. This includes changing the camera settings and exporting the handwritten text to Microsoft Word remotely. The S Pen also comes with additional tips for replacement in the box.

=== Software ===
The Note 10 range ships with Android 9 “Pie” with Samsung's One UI skin. A main design element of the One UI is intentional repositioning of key user interface elements in stock apps to improve usability on large screens. Many apps include large headers that push the beginning of content towards the center of the display, while navigation controls and other prompts are often displayed near the bottom of the display instead. In March 2020, the phones received an upgrade to Android 10, bringing with it Single Take mode from the Galaxy S20 line as well as the ability to record 4K@60fps video with the selfie camera.

==== Support lifecycle ====
On August 5, 2020, the Note 10 series and a selection of other Galaxy devices including their successor, were announced to receive three generations of Android software update support and 4 years of security update support (meaning support ended in 2023 for the original and 2024 for Lite).

An official list, released by Samsung on December 2, 2020, further confirmed that all S10 models would be receiving the Android 11 upgrade with One UI 3.0.

In January 2022, the Galaxy Note 10 series received the Android 12 upgrade with One UI 4, and in late March 2022 started the roll-out of One UI 4.1 which marked the last major operating system upgrade for the series, while Android 13 with One UI 5.1, issued by June 2023, was the last major OS update for the Note 10 Lite.

The Galaxy Note 10 and Note 10+ reached its end of life in October 2023 with the September 2023 security patch. In contrast, the Galaxy Note 10 Lite reached the end of its lifecycle in March 2024 (alongside the Galaxy S10 Lite).

== Gallery ==
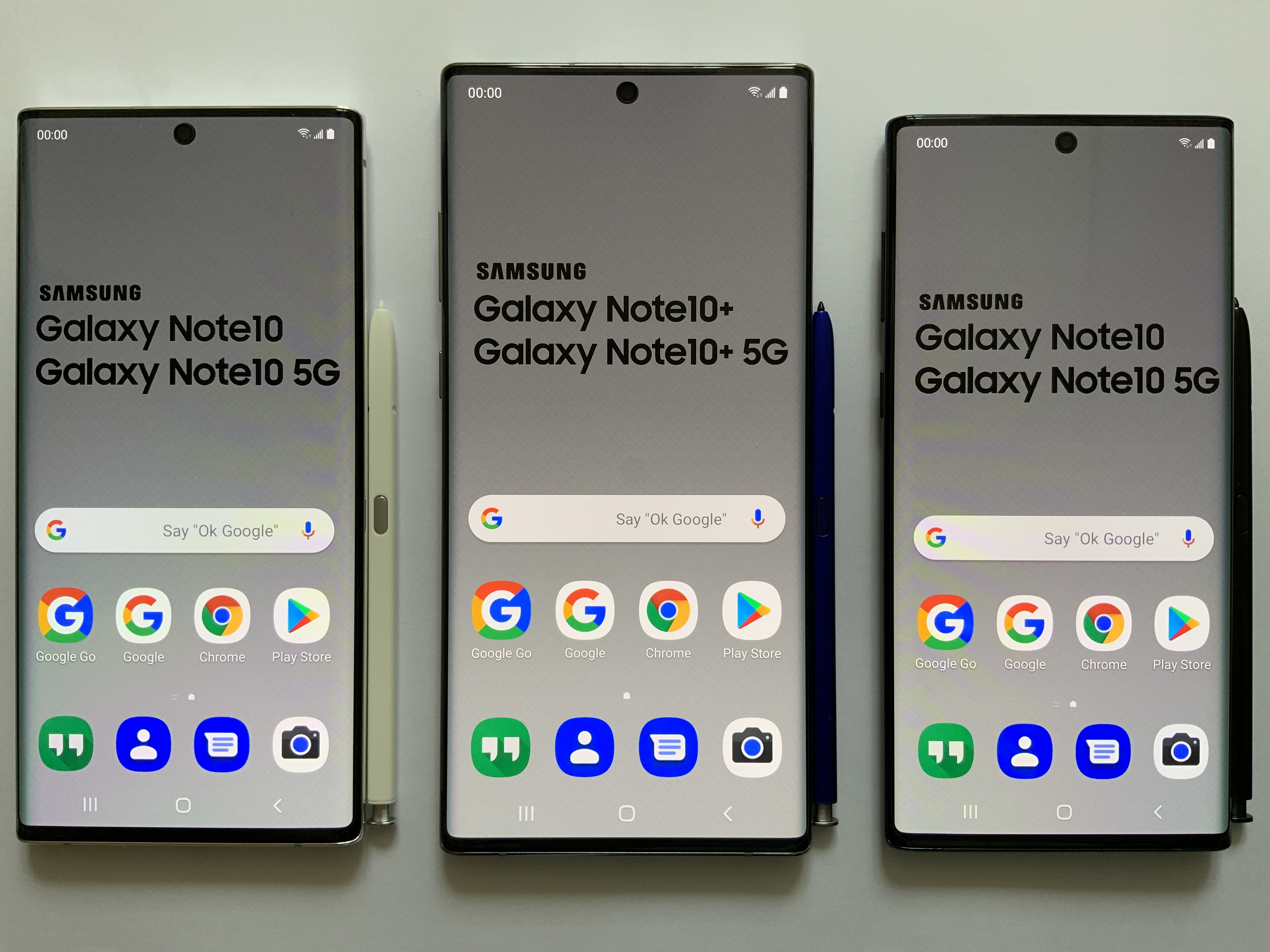
Front of the Samsung Galaxy Note 10 and Note 10+

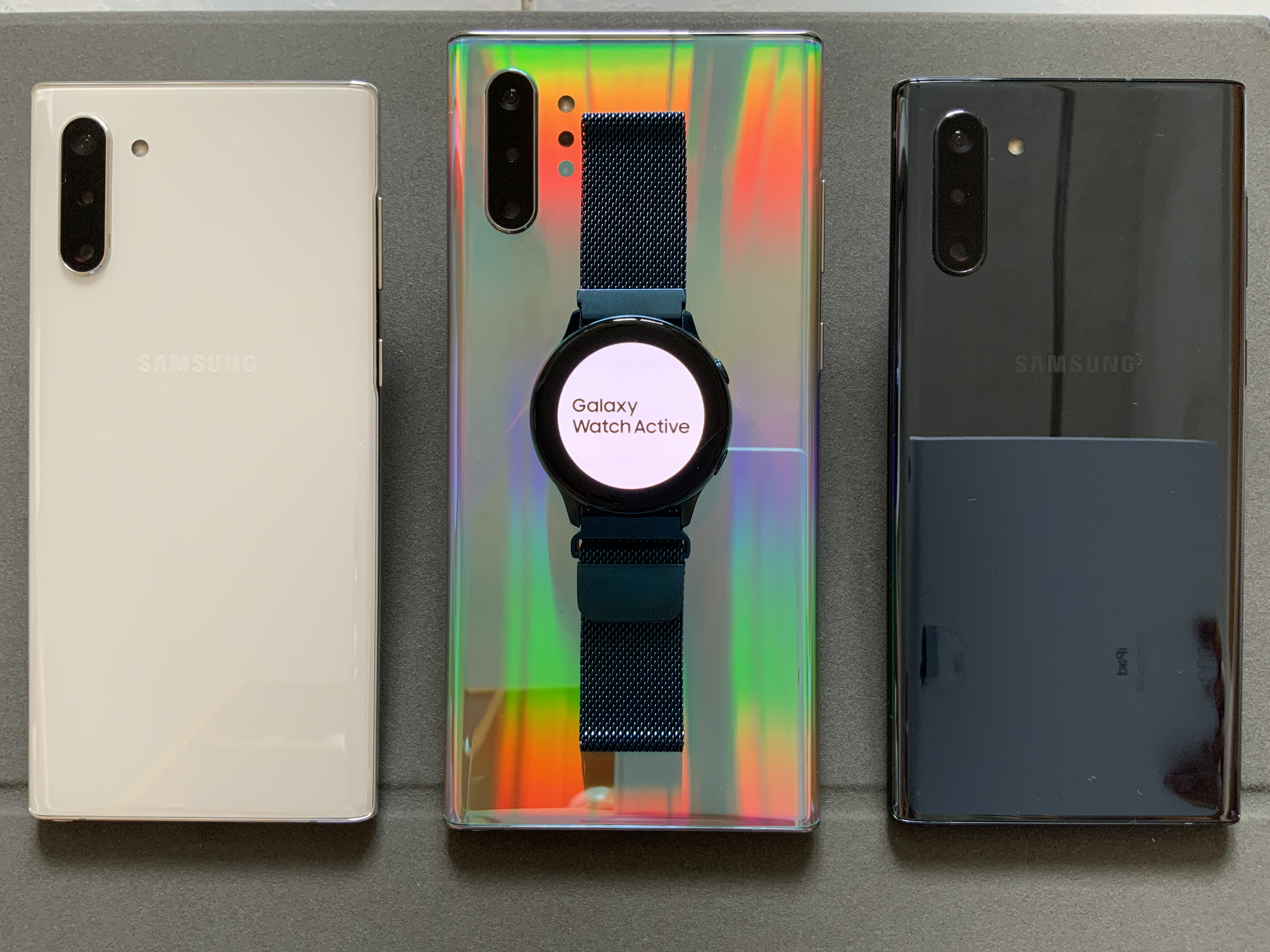
Wireless Powershare being used on the Note 10+

== See also ==
- Samsung Electronics
- Samsung Galaxy
- Samsung Galaxy S10
- Samsung Galaxy Fold
- Samsung Galaxy Note series

Preceded by Samsung Galaxy Note 9	Samsung Galaxy Note 10; 2019	Succeeded by Samsung Galaxy Note 20
