= Samsung Galaxy Fold =

2019 foldable smartphone by Samsung Electronics

Samsung Galaxy Fold Samsung Galaxy Fold 5G Samsung W20 5G (sold in China)

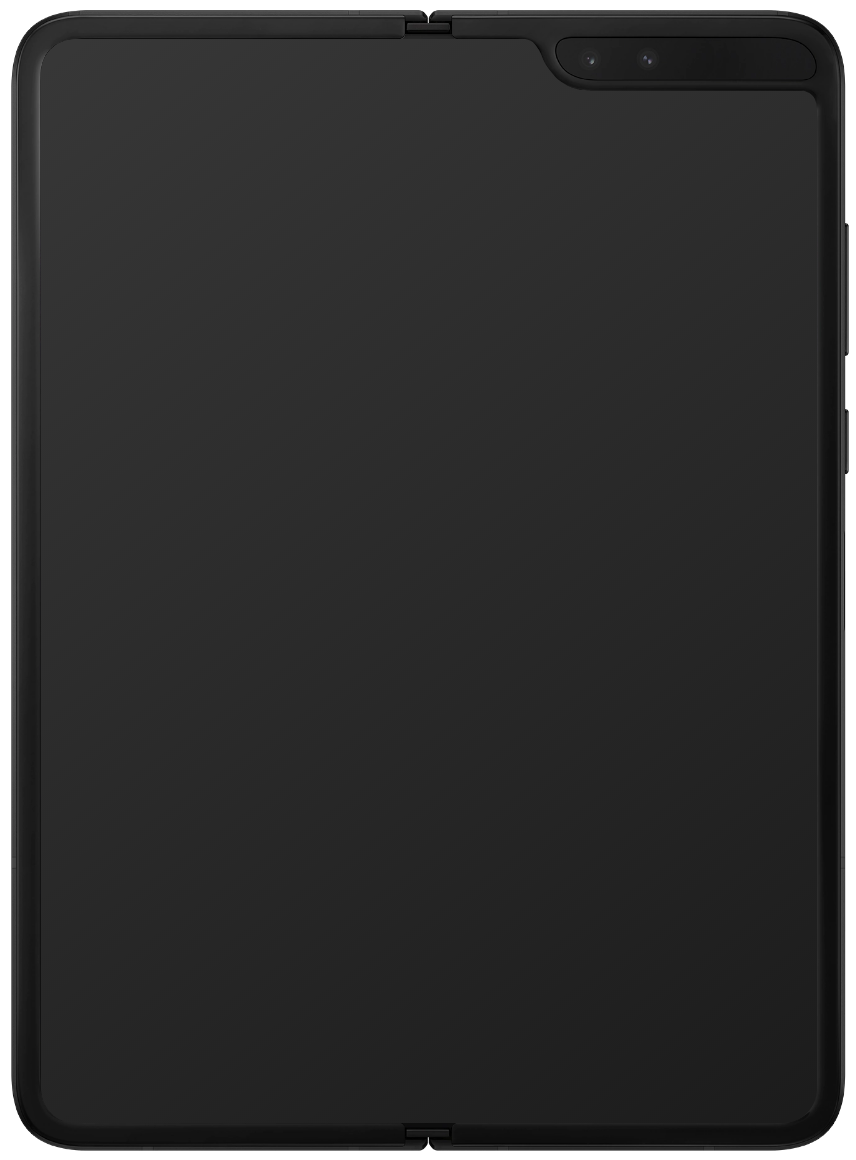
- Also known as: Samsung W20 5G (sold in China)
- Brand: Samsung
- Manufacturer: Samsung Electronics
- Type: Foldable smartphone
- Series: Galaxy Z
- Family: Samsung Galaxy
- First released: September 9, 2019; 7 years ago
- Availability by region: September 6, 2019; 7 years ago (South Korea); September 9, 2019; 7 years ago (Worldwide); September 27, 2019; 7 years ago (United States); October 25, 2019; 7 years ago (Japan); December 30, 2019; 6 years ago (Indonesia)
- Discontinued: September 1, 2020; 6 years ago (successor); August 6, 2022; 4 years ago (support)
- Predecessor: Samsung SM-W2019 (for W20 5G)
- Successor: Samsung Galaxy Z Fold 2 Samsung W21 5G
- Related: Samsung Galaxy S10; Samsung Galaxy Note 10; Samsung Galaxy Z Flip
- Compatible networks: 2G / 3G / 4G / 4G LTE; 5G NR (certain models)
- Form factor: Foldable slate
- Dimensions: Unfolded: 160.9 mm (6.33 in) H 117.9 mm (4.64 in) W 6.9 mm (0.27 in) D Folded: 160.9 mm (6.33 in) H 62.9 mm (2.48 in) W 17.1–15.7 mm (0.67–0.62 in) D
- Weight: 263 g (9.3 oz)
- Operating system: Original: Android 9.0 "Pie" with One UI 1.1; Current: Android 12L with One UI 4.1.1
- System-on-chip: Qualcomm Snapdragon 855
- CPU: Octa-core (1x 2.84 GHz, 3x 2.42 GHz and 4x 1.8 GHz) Kryo 485
- GPU: Adreno 640
- Modem: Snapdragon X24 (LTE models); Snapdragon X50 (5G models)
- Memory: 12 GB LPDDR4X
- Storage: 512 GB UFS 3.0
- Battery: 4380 mAh (4G LTE); 4235 mAh (5G)
- Charging: Fast charging up to 15 W Qi 15 W fast wireless charging
- Rear camera: 12 MP, f/1.5/2.4 dual-aperture 12 MP, f/2.4 telephoto, 2x optical zoom 16 MP, f/2.2, ultra-wide-angle
- Front camera: Outside: 10 MP, f/2.2 Inside: 10 MP, f/2.2, 8 MP RGB depth sensor
- Display: Dynamic AMOLED, HDR10+, 1536 × 2152, 7.3 in (18.5 cm), ~4.2:3 aspect ratio, 362 ppi
- External display: Dynamic AMOLED, HDR10+, 720 × 1680, 4.6 in (11.7 cm), 21:9 ratio, 397 ppi
- Sound: Dolby Atmos stereo speakers
- Connectivity: Bluetooth 5.0; Wi-Fi 6; 4G/LTE (5G on Fold 5G model)
- Data inputs: Sensors: Accelerometer; Barometer; Fingerprint scanner (side-mounted); Pressure sensor; Gyroscope; Hall sensor; Heart rate sensor; Proximity sensor; Magnetometer; RGB Light sensor
- Model: Fold: SM-F900x; Fold 5G: SM-F907x (last letter varies by carrier and international models); SCV44 (Japan; au)
- Codename: Winner
- Other: Physical sound volume keys Bixby key USB-C port with USB 5Gbps and DisplayPort Alternate Mode (for Samsung DeX)
- Website: Galaxy Fold

The Samsung Galaxy Fold is an Android-based foldable smartphone manufactured, developed and designed by Samsung Electronics. It was previewed in 2018 as the Infinity Flex and was unveiled on February 20, 2019, alongside the Galaxy S10 series, the Galaxy Watch Active, the Galaxy Fit/Fit e and the Galaxy Buds, and was released globally beginning on September 6, 2019. The device is capable of being folded open like a book to expose a 7.3-inch tablet-sized flexible display, while its front contains a smaller “cover” display, intended for accessing the device without opening it. With the announcement of the Galaxy Z Flip, a clamshell foldable, Samsung's foldable phones were made part of the Galaxy Z series. This also retroactively applies to the Galaxy Fold.

The Galaxy Fold received mixed pre-release reception, with praise for its innovative design, but criticism over the device's durability and longevity, and it was concluded that the Galaxy Fold was a proof of concept device for early adopters rather than a device suited for the mass market. Due to issues with the device's durability and susceptibility to damage, Samsung announced that it would recall the review units and delay the release of the Galaxy Fold indefinitely while it addressed the problems. Samsung officially detailed its design changes in July and released the phone in September 2019. The company claimed to have sold one million units since launch by December 2019, but Samsung later denied having sold 1 million units, and admitted having reported sales expectations as actual sales. The successor to the Galaxy Fold, the Galaxy Z Fold 2, was announced on August 5, 2020.

== History ==
A prototype of the Galaxy Fold (obscured to hide its final design) and its "Infinity Flex Display" was unveiled during a Samsung developers' conference in November 2018, demonstrating the adaptations to Samsung's Android distribution and newly unveiled One UI software. Google stated that it would work with OEMs to support foldable devices on Android (an effort achieved natively in Android 10).

On February 20, 2019, at the 2019 Galaxy Unpacked Event, Samsung unveiled and announced the Galaxy Fold with the specs, pricing, and release date alongside the Galaxy S10, Galaxy S10e, Galaxy S10+, Galaxy S10 5G, the Galaxy Watch Active, and the Galaxy Fit, the Galaxy Fit e and the Galaxy Buds.

=== Delay ===
After reports surfaced that Samsung had postponed a Chinese launch event and that review units' inner display was breaking, Samsung announced on April 22 that the launch (originally set for April 26) had been delayed indefinitely while they work to fix the issue, with plans to announce the new release date sometime within the coming weeks and that the defective review units are being recalled. Samsung later announced that Galaxy Fold pre-orders would automatically be cancelled if the device had not been shipped by May 31, and the customer had not otherwise confirmed their order. On May 24, 2019, U.S. retailer Best Buy cancelled all pre-orders. AT&T subsequently cancelled pre-orders on June 13, 2019, announcing that it would issue refunds, as well as complimentary US$100 bill credits.

CNET drew comparisons between the postponement and the battery-related recalls of the Galaxy Note 7. On a test by CNET, the Galaxy Fold's hinge only lasted for 120,000 folds (equivalent to 3 years of use) out of the advertised 200,000 folds (equivalent to 5 years of use).

On July 24, 2019, Samsung announced that it was now targeting a September release, and detailed design changes intended to help reinforce the screen and protect the hinge. Caps were added on the top and bottom of the hinge area, and the protective layer was extended under the bezel to prevent accidental removal. Samsung also added extra layers of metal under the screen. Samsung also stated that it had reduced the space between the hinge and body of the device.

Samsung issued more detailed care instructions with the new release, advising users against placing items or adhesives on the screen, pressing the screen with hard objects, exposure to liquids or small particles, removing the protective layer, and also warning about placing the phone near items sensitive to magnets. The Verge remarked that the new instructions were akin to "a pharmaceutical ad that has to disclose dozens of side effects". In the United States, select retailers and Samsung stores offered a “Premier Service” for the device, including an orientation session post-purchase, a dedicated customer support line specific to Galaxy Fold-related issues, and the ability to purchase a one-time screen replacement out-of-warranty from one of the aforementioned outlets for US$149 (however, the device still carries a standard one-year warranty).

=== Luxury model ===
A version of the device was released exclusively for China Telecom, marketed as the Galaxy W20 5G with a faster Snapdragon 855+ processor and a unique white finish. The W20 went on sale on December 12, 2019; it is available in two colors (Space Silver and Cosmos Black).

== Specifications ==
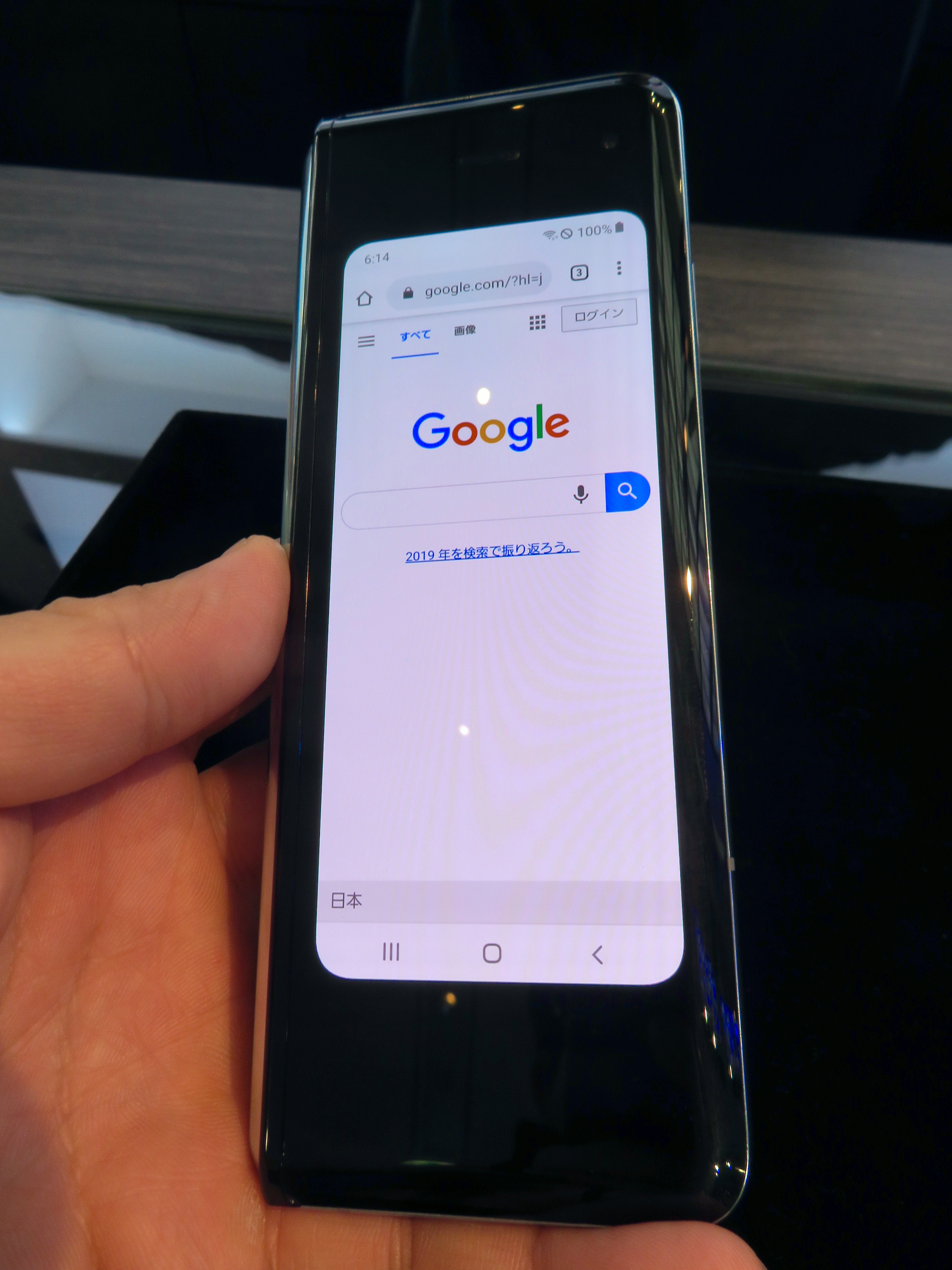
A Galaxy Fold while folded, showing the front external display

The Galaxy Fold contains two displays; its front cover contains a small, 4.6-inch display in the center designed for one-handed use, and the device can fold open to expose a 7.3-inch display. Samsung rated the fold mechanism as supporting up to 200,000 uses. The tablet screen contains a large notch in the top-right corner and is coated with a custom multi-layer laminate instead of glass. Its power button contains a fingerprint reader.

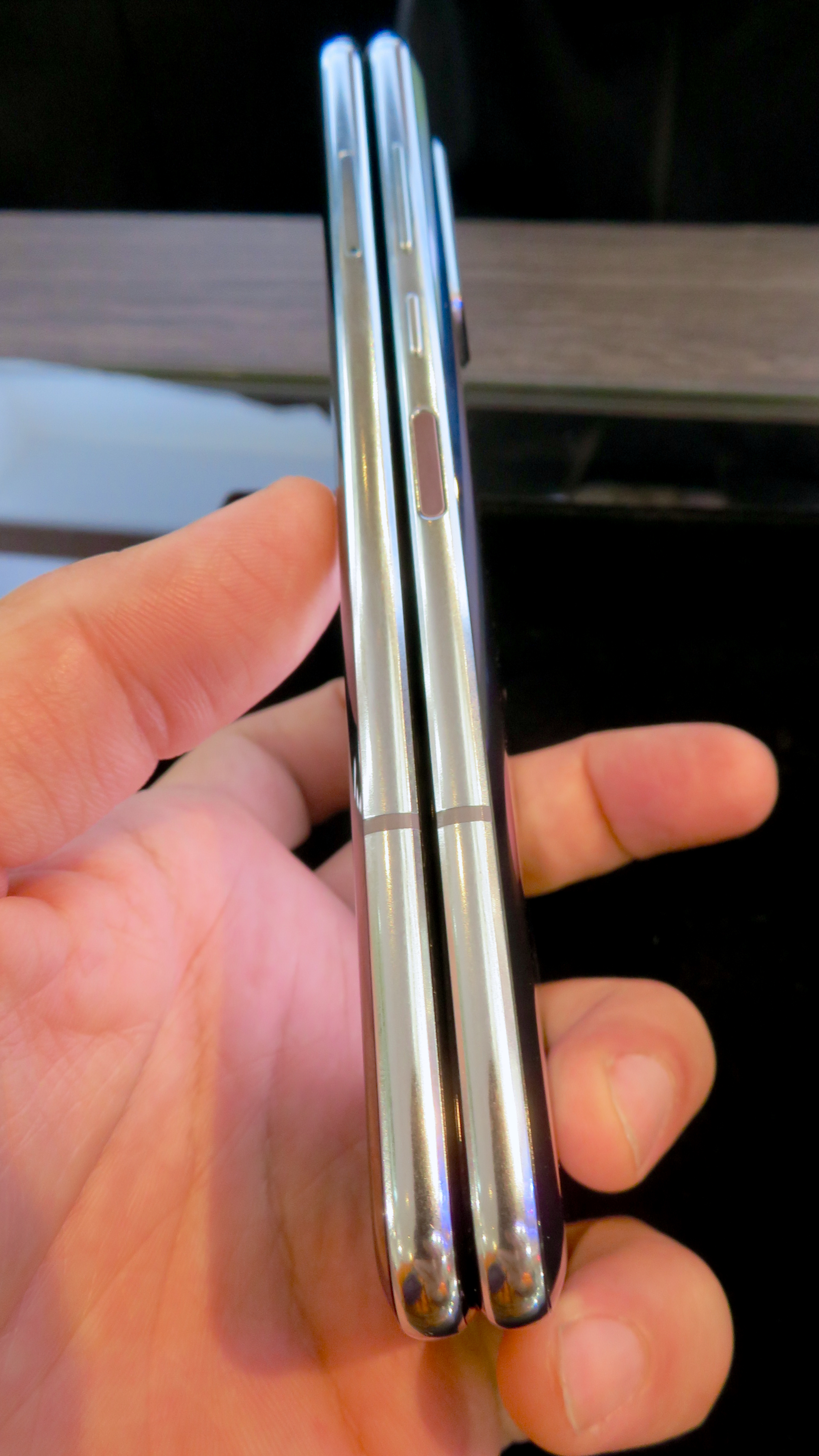
Exterior of the Galaxy Fold while folded

The phone uses the Qualcomm Snapdragon 855 processor and contains 12 GB of RAM and has 512 GB of non-expandable storage. Unlike other Samsung devices, the Qualcomm chip is used in all regions instead of only being used in selected markets. The Galaxy Fold also has a 5G-capable variant with a slightly smaller battery.

The device contains two batteries split between the two halves, totaling 4380 mAh (4235 mAh on the 5G model). The Galaxy Fold contains 6 cameras, using the same sensors equipped on the Galaxy S10+, including three rear-facing camera lenses (12-megapixel wide angle, 12-megapixel 2x telephoto, and 16-megapixel ultra wide-angle), as well as a 10-megapixel front-facing camera on the cover, and a second 10-megapixel front-facing camera, accompanied by an RGB depth sensor, on the inside screen.

The Galaxy Fold ships with Android 9.0 “Pie” and Samsung's One UI software. An enhanced Multi Window mode is available for the device, supporting up to three apps on-screen at once. Apps opened on the smaller screen can expand into their larger, tablet-oriented layouts when the user unfolds the device.

=== Software lifecycle ===
On August 18, 2020, the Galaxy Fold, alongside a selection of other Galaxy flagship devices from 2019 onwards, were announced to receive three generations of Android software update support.

== Reception ==
Digital Trends praised the Fold's software, performance, camera and main screen, while criticizing the price, the front screen design and the lack of water resistance. Chokkattu remarked that "[it's] a lot of fun to use because it's so new", but noted that "it remains technology that's out of reach for most people". CNET felt that the inside of the device felt “toy-like” in contrast to the premium exterior, noting the fragility of its screen, a plastic bezel, a "ridiculous and unnecessarily large" notch, a crease in the screen visible from certain viewing angles, and gaps at the top and bottom of the hinge that were potentially susceptible to dust and debris. The lack of water resistance was also noted, and it was felt that the size of the cover screen made typing difficult. It was concluded that the Galaxy Fold was a "testbed device for developers and the earliest adopters to buy, and for the rest of us to ponder over".

Dieter Bohn of The Verge considered the fold-out tablet screen a “joy” to use, but remarked that its thick form factor and small cover screen made the Galaxy Fold less suited for shorter, frequent uses like a smartphone. He also panned the display for not being as smooth as a glass screen, being susceptible to scratches and blemishes over time, the aforementioned crease, the large notch, a “jelly” distortion between the two sides when scrolling, and having too many potential points of failure. Bohn praised its high-end hardware, and especially its batteries, and felt that multitasking was flexible but inelegant, and buggy with certain apps on transitions between modes. In conclusion, he felt that the Galaxy Fold was "legitimately a marvelous thing to play with", but that the device was more of a status symbol than a legitimate consumer product.

== Issues ==
Review units showed a high rate of display failure; a teardown by iFixit noted that the crease contained noticeable gaps at the top and bottom, making it susceptible to foreign debris coming under the screen. This resulted in “bulges” experienced by multiple reviewers, including Blick, and The Verge—whose screen was damaged in this manner. At Samsung's request, this teardown was removed from the website, although it was later reinstated after the re-release of the Galaxy Fold.

A number of other reviewers damaged the screen by mistakenly removing one of the clear laminate layers that covers it. Samsung advised that the "special protective layer" that coats the screen must not be removed, as doing so may cause damage to the screen. Concerns were raised that consumers may mistake it for a pre-installed screen protector without proper advisories: retail units of the Galaxy Fold did contain a disclaimer. Samsung later stated that it would “thoroughly inspect” the defective review units to investigate the issues. Samsung would later delay the release of the phone, and make numerous changes to the screen in an effort to mitigate the issue.

== See also ==
- Samsung Galaxy Z Flip
- Samsung Galaxy Z series

Preceded by N/A	Samsung Galaxy Fold; 2019	Succeeded by Samsung Galaxy Z Fold 2
