= Samsung Galaxy Fit (smartwatch) =

2019 activity tracker by Samsung Electronics

Samsung Galaxy Fit Samsung Galaxy Fit e

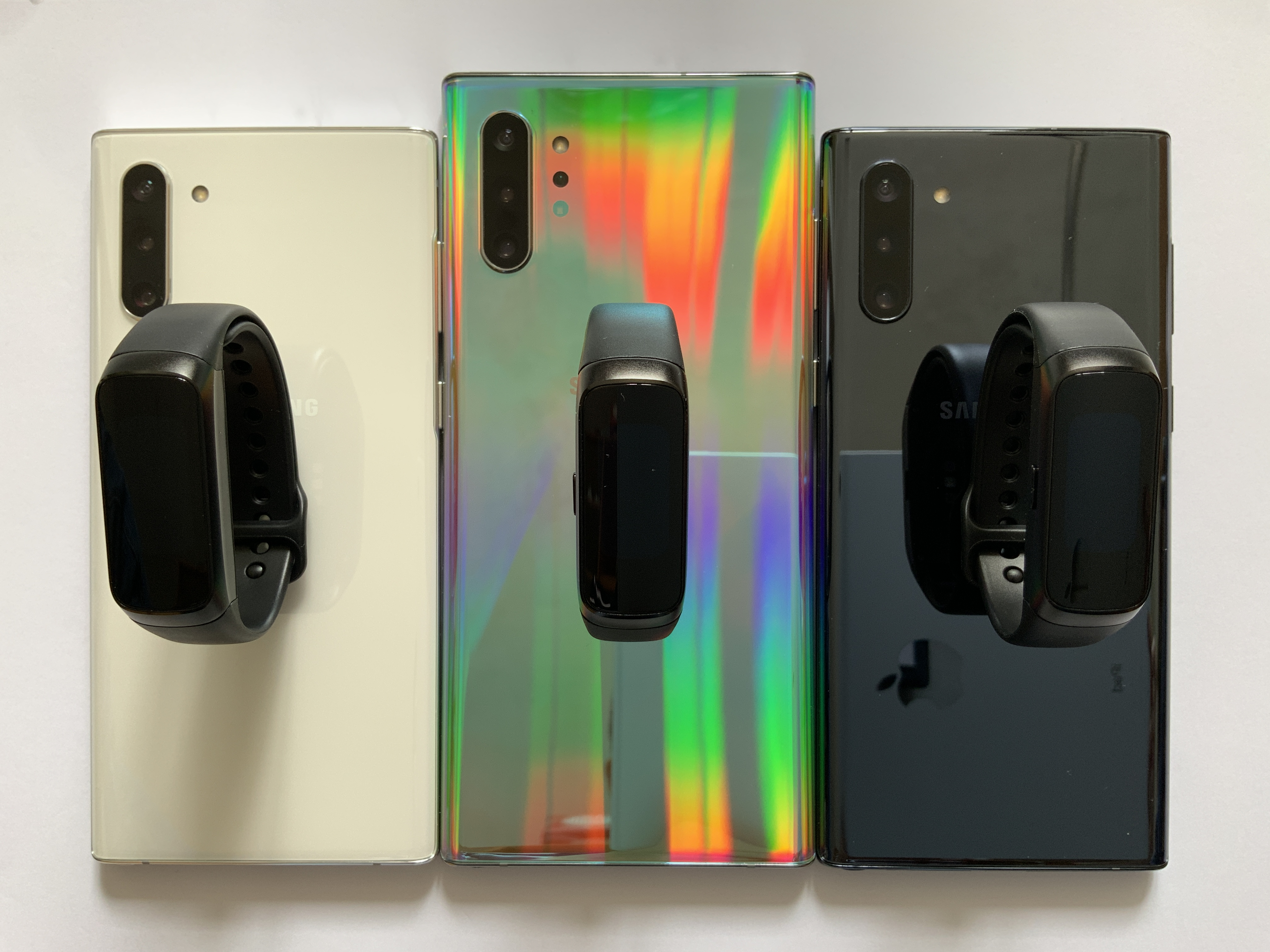
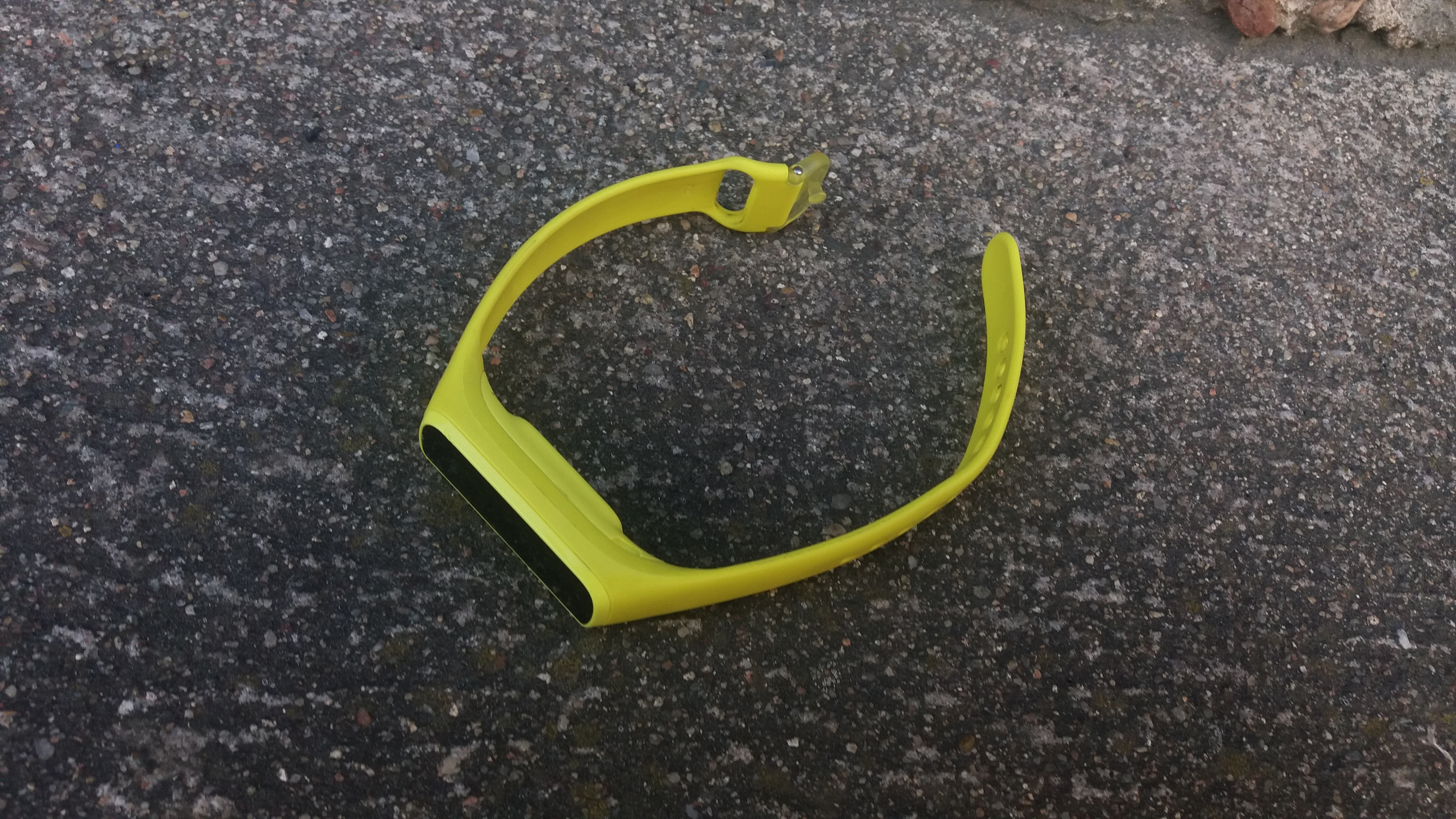
- Samsung Galaxy Fit Samsung Galaxy Fit e
- Brand: Samsung
- Manufacturer: Samsung Electronics
- Type: Activity tracker
- Series: Galaxy Fit
- Family: Samsung Galaxy
- First released: June 14, 2019; 7 years ago
- Availability by region: June 14, 2019; 7 years ago
- Discontinued: August 5, 2020; 6 years ago
- Predecessor: Samsung Gear Fit 2 Pro
- Successor: Samsung Galaxy Fit 2
- Dimensions: 18.3 mm (0.72 in) H 44.6 mm (1.76 in) W 11.2 mm (0.44 in) D
- Operating system: FreeRTOS
- CPU: MCU Cortex M33F dual-core 96MHz M0+ 16MHz
- Battery: Fit: 120 mAh; Fit e: 70 mAh
- Website: Galaxy Fit

The Samsung Galaxy Fit is an activity tracker manufactured, designed, developed, and marketed by Samsung Electronics. It was announced on February 20, 2019, at the Samsung's Galaxy Unpacked event, alongside the lower-priced Galaxy Fit e, the Galaxy S10 series, the Galaxy Fold, the Galaxy Watch Active and the Galaxy Buds. It was available for sale on June 14, 2019.

== Specifications ==
Samsung Galaxy Fit
| Product | Galaxy Fit | Galaxy Fit e |
| Screen | 0.95” Circular Super AMOLED; Resolution 120 x 240 | 0.74” Circular Super AMOLED; Resolution 64 x 128 |
| Processor | Cortex M33F 96Mhz + M0 16Mhz | Cortex M0 96Mhz |
| Operating System | Tizen | |
| Battery | 120 mAh Lithium-Ion Battery | 70 mAh Lithium-Ion Battery |
| Charge | Wireless Charging | |

== Hardware ==
The watch measures 18.3 mm × 44.6 mm × 11.2 mm (0.72 in × 1.76 in × 0.44 in), without the strap, with a weight of 23 grams (0.81 oz). It features a 0.95-inch (24 mm) 120x240 AMOLED touchscreen display, with 32MB of internal storage and 2MB of RAM. It contains a 120mAh battery, and has an accelerometer, gyroscope, and heartrate sensor. It is also rated waterproof up to 5ATM. The watch can be charged wirelessly through near-field communication.

== Software ==
The Galaxy Fit pairs through Bluetooth 5.0 with a smartphone running an OS newer than Android 5.0 or iOS 10.0. The pairing requires the installation of three applications and one plugin, which include the Galaxy Fit plugin, the Samsung Wearables app, Samsung Health, and Samsung Accessory Service. The watch runs on RTOS. It has various widgets for fitness, stress, and heartbeat tracking, although it did not have GPS connected with the phone when launched, a software update added this feature.

== Reception ==
The smartwatch received mixed to positive reviews from critics. PC Magazine gave it a 4/5 excellent score, praising the cost, accurate health tracking, and battery, while criticizing the need for two applications and the large bezel. Reviewers from TechRadar gave the watch a score of 3/5, positively describing the battery life and display, while critiquing the lack of GPS and the quality of the distance tracking. Digital Trends and Android Authority praised the display, water resistance, battery, and weight, but criticised the lack of GPS and the setup procedures.
