= Samsung Galaxy Z Fold 2 =

2020 foldable smartphone by Samsung Electronics

Samsung Galaxy Z Fold 2 Samsung W21 5G (sold in China)

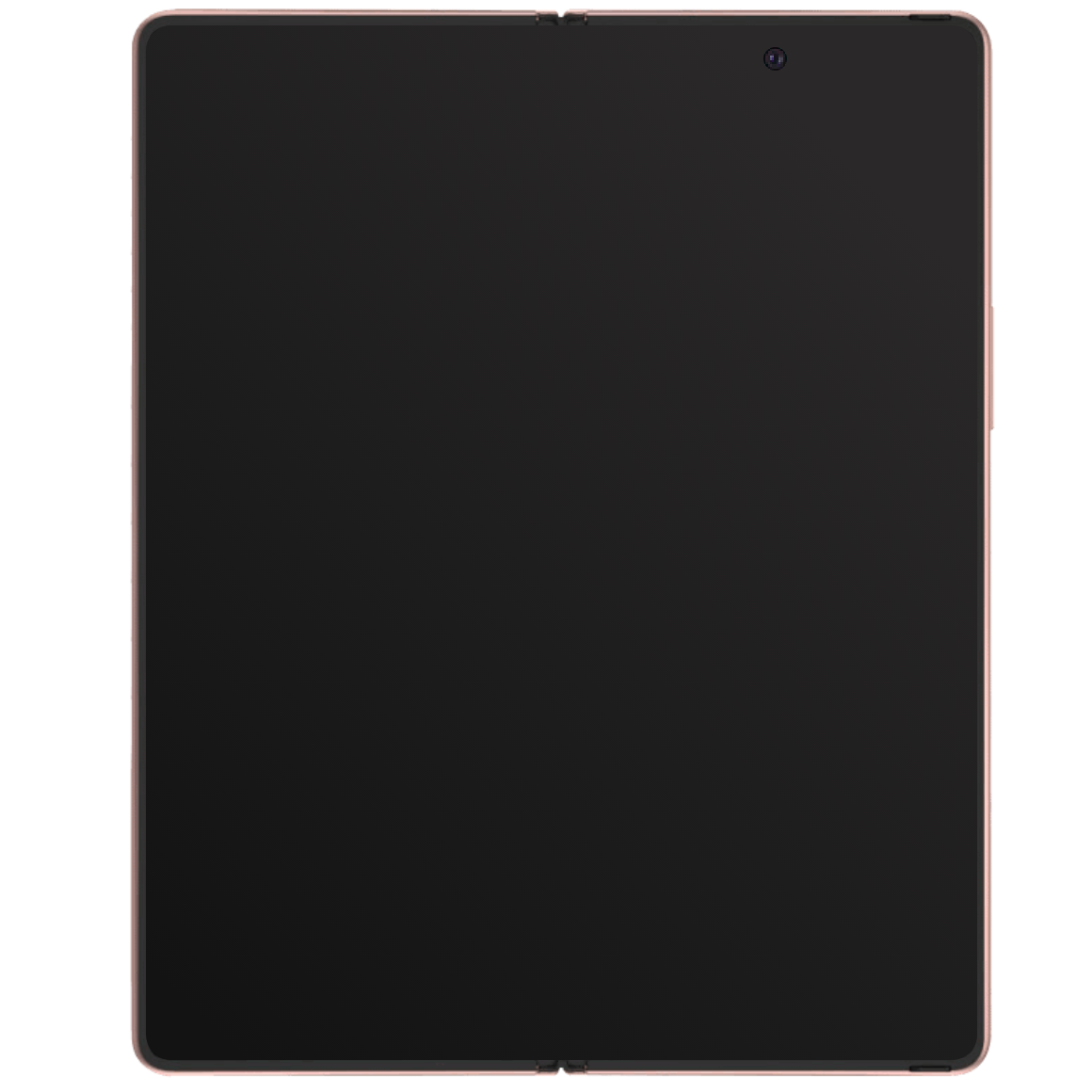
- Also known as: Samsung Galaxy Fold 2 (in certain European countries); Samsung W21 5G (in China)
- Brand: Samsung
- Manufacturer: Samsung Electronics
- Type: Foldable smartphone
- Series: Galaxy Z
- Family: Samsung Galaxy
- First released: September 18, 2020; 6 years ago
- Availability by region: September 18, 2020; 6 years ago
- Discontinued: August 11, 2021; 5 years ago (successor); October 9, 2024; 2 years ago (support)
- Predecessor: Samsung Galaxy Fold
- Successor: Samsung Galaxy Z Fold 3
- Related: Samsung Galaxy S20; Samsung Galaxy Z Flip; Samsung Galaxy Note 20
- Compatible networks: 2G / 3G / 4G / 5G
- Form factor: Foldable slate
- Dimensions: Unfolded: 159.2 mm (6.27 in) H 128.2 mm (5.05 in) W 6.9 mm (0.27 in) D Folded: 159.2 mm (6.27 in) H 68.0 mm (2.68 in) W 13.8–16.8 mm (0.54–0.66 in) D
- Weight: 282 g (9.9 oz)
- Operating system: Original: Android 10 with One UI 2.5; Current: Android 13 with One UI 5.1.1
- System-on-chip: Qualcomm Snapdragon 865+
- CPU: Octa-core (1x 3.09 GHz, 3x 2.42 GHz and 4x 1.8 GHz) Kryo 585
- GPU: Adreno 650
- Memory: 12 GB LPDDR5
- Storage: 256 GB or 512 GB UFS 3.1
- Removable storage: None
- Battery: 4400 mAh
- Rear camera: 12 MP, f/1.8, 26mm, 1/1.76", 1.8 μm (wide); 12 MP, f/2.4, 52mm, 1/3.6", 1.0 μm (telephoto); 12 MP, f/2.2, 12mm, 1.12 μm (ultrawide); Dual Pixel PDAF, PDAF, OIS, gyro-EIS, HDR, 2x optical zoom 4K@60 fps, 1080p@60/240 fps, 720p@960 fps, HDR10+
- Front camera: 2× 10 MP, f/2.2, 26mm, 1.22 μm Gyro-EIS, HDR; 4K@60 fps, 1080p@30 fps
- Display: Dynamic AMOLED 2X, 2208 × 1768, 7.6 in (19.3 cm), ~5:4 aspect ratio, 373 ppi, HDR10+, 120 Hz refresh rate
- External display: Super AMOLED, 2260 × 816, 6.2 in (15.7cm), ~25:9 ratio, 386 ppi, HDR10+
- Sound: Dolby Atmos stereo speakers
- Connectivity: Bluetooth 5.0, A2DP, low-energy, aptX HD; Wi-Fi 802.11 a/b/g/n/ac/6, dual-band
- Data inputs: USB-C; Sensors: Accelerometer; Barometer; Fingerprint scanner (side-mounted); Pressure sensor; Gyroscope; Hall sensor; Proximity sensor; Magnetometer
- Water resistance: None
- Model: SM-F916B; SCG05 (Japan; au)
- Codename: Top
- Website: Galaxy Z Fold 2

The Samsung Galaxy Z Fold 2 (stylized as Samsung Galaxy Z Fold2, sold as Samsung Galaxy Fold 2 in certain territories) is an Android-based foldable smartphone manufactured and developed by Samsung Electronics for its Galaxy Z series, succeeding the Galaxy Fold. During its reveal, it was first announced on August 5, 2020 alongside the Galaxy Note 20, the Galaxy Tab S7, the Galaxy Buds Live, and the Galaxy Watch 3 at the Samsung's first Galaxy Unpacked event part. And later, it revealed pricing and availability details on September 1, 2020 at the second Galaxy Unpacked event part, alongside the Galaxy Fit 2 announcement, before being progressively released to all major markets on September 18.

On August 11, 2021, the Galaxy Z Fold 2 was succeeded by the Galaxy Z Fold 3. The Galaxy Z Fold 2 stopped receiving security updates on October 9, 2024.

== Specifications ==
=== Design ===
Unlike the original Fold which had an entirely plastic screen, the screen is protected by 30 μm (0.0012 in)-thick “ultra-thin glass” with a plastic layer like the Z Flip, manufactured by Samsung with materials from Schott AG; conventional Gorilla Glass is used for the back panels with an aluminum frame. The hinge mechanism is also borrowed from the Z Flip, using nylon fibers designed to keep dust out; it is self-supporting from 75 to 115 degrees. The power button is embedded in the frame and doubles as the fingerprint sensor, with the volume rocker located above. The device comes in two colors, Mystic Bronze and Mystic Black, as well as a Limited Edition Thom Browne model. In select regions, users are able to customize the hinge color when ordering the phone from Samsung's website.

=== Hardware ===
The Galaxy Z Fold 2 contains two screens: its front cover uses a 6.2-inch display in the center with minimal bezels, significantly larger than its predecessor's 4.6-inch display, and the device can fold open to expose a 7.6-inch display, with a circular cutout in the top center right replacing the notch along with a thinner border. Both displays support HDR10+; the internal display benefits from an adaptive 120 Hz refresh rate like the S20 series and Note 20 Ultra.

The device has 12 GB of LPDDR5 RAM, and either 256 or 512 GB of non-expandable UFS 3.1. Storage availability varies by country, the 512 GB version is the most scarce by far. The Z Fold 2 is powered by the Qualcomm Snapdragon 865+, which is used in all regions (unlike other flagship Samsung phones that have been split between Snapdragon and Samsung's in-house Exynos chips depending on the market). It uses two batteries split between the two halves, totalling a slightly larger 4500 mAh capacity; fast charging is supported over USB-C at up to 25 W or wirelessly via Qi at up to 11 W. The Z Fold 2 contains 5 cameras, including three rear-facing camera lenses (12 MP, 12 MP telephoto, and 12 MP ultra wide-angle), as well as a 10 MP front-facing camera on the cover, and a second 10-megapixel front-facing camera on the inside screen.

=== Software ===
The Galaxy Z Fold 2 shipped with Android 10 and Samsung's One UI software; by means of an improved Multi Window mode, up to three supported apps can be placed on-screen at once. Apps open on the smaller screen can expand into their larger, tablet-oriented layouts when the user unfolds the device. Additionally, supported apps will now automatically get a split-screen view with a sidebar and main app pane. New to the Z Fold 2 is split-screen functionality, called “Flex Mode”, which is compatible with certain apps like YouTube and Google Duo along with native Samsung apps. Samsung promised 3 Android OS upgrades and 4 years of security updates to the Z series of 2020, ending in 2024. As of May 2024, the device is currently running on Android 13 and One UI 5.1.1. Afterwards, it no longer received software updates from Samsung.

=== Luxury model ===
In November 2020, Samsung unveiled the Samsung W21 5G, a luxury version of the Z Fold2, exclusively available to the Chinese market. The phone is identical to its counterparts, in terms of its design and specifications, except for a slightly taller build and two SIM card slots. The phone features an exclusive “Glitter Gold” color, which consists of a seven-layer nano-level optical film attached to the glass back that has vertical ridges for added texture.

== Gallery ==
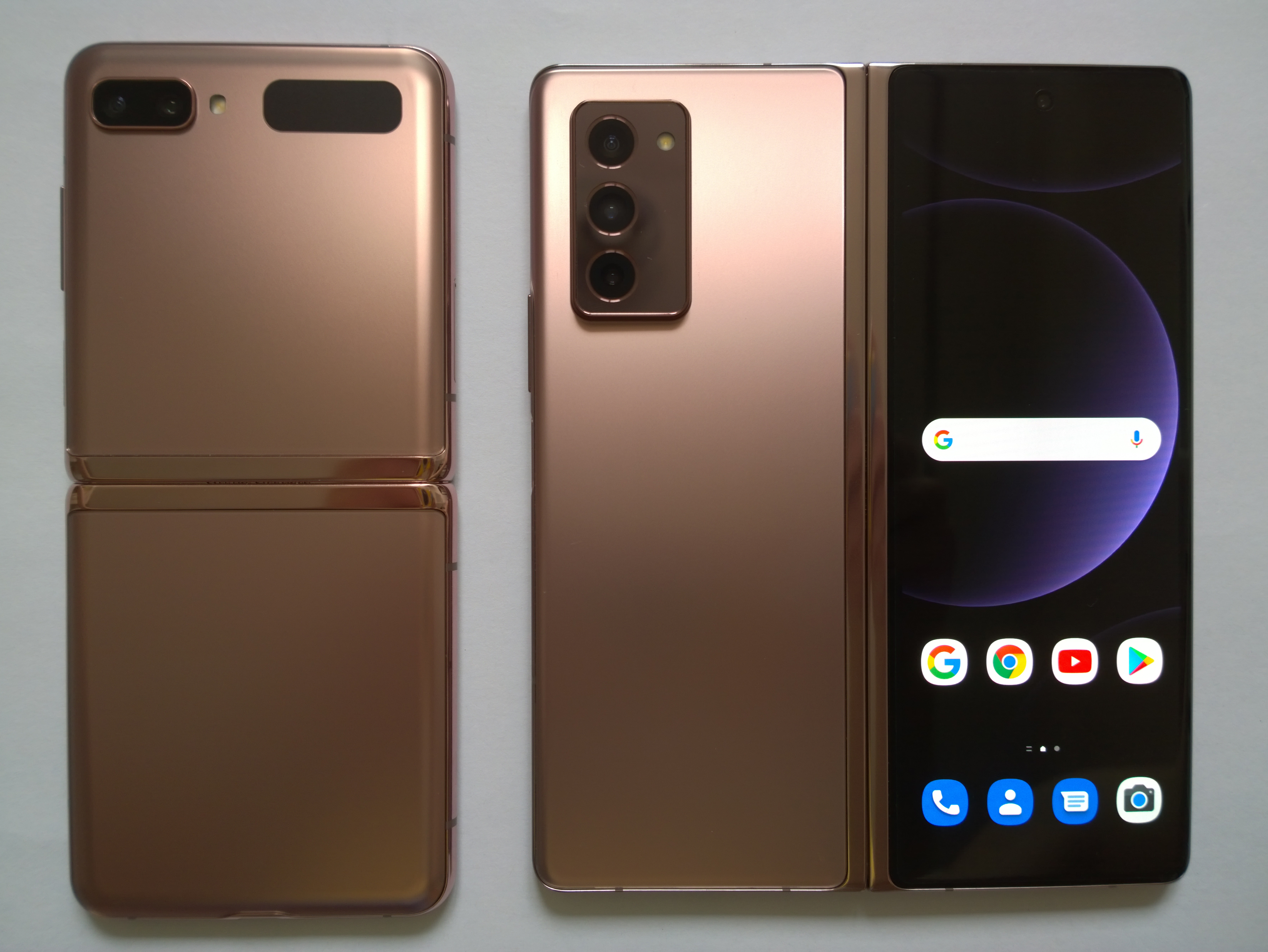
Unfolded Galaxy Z Fold 2 & Z Flip

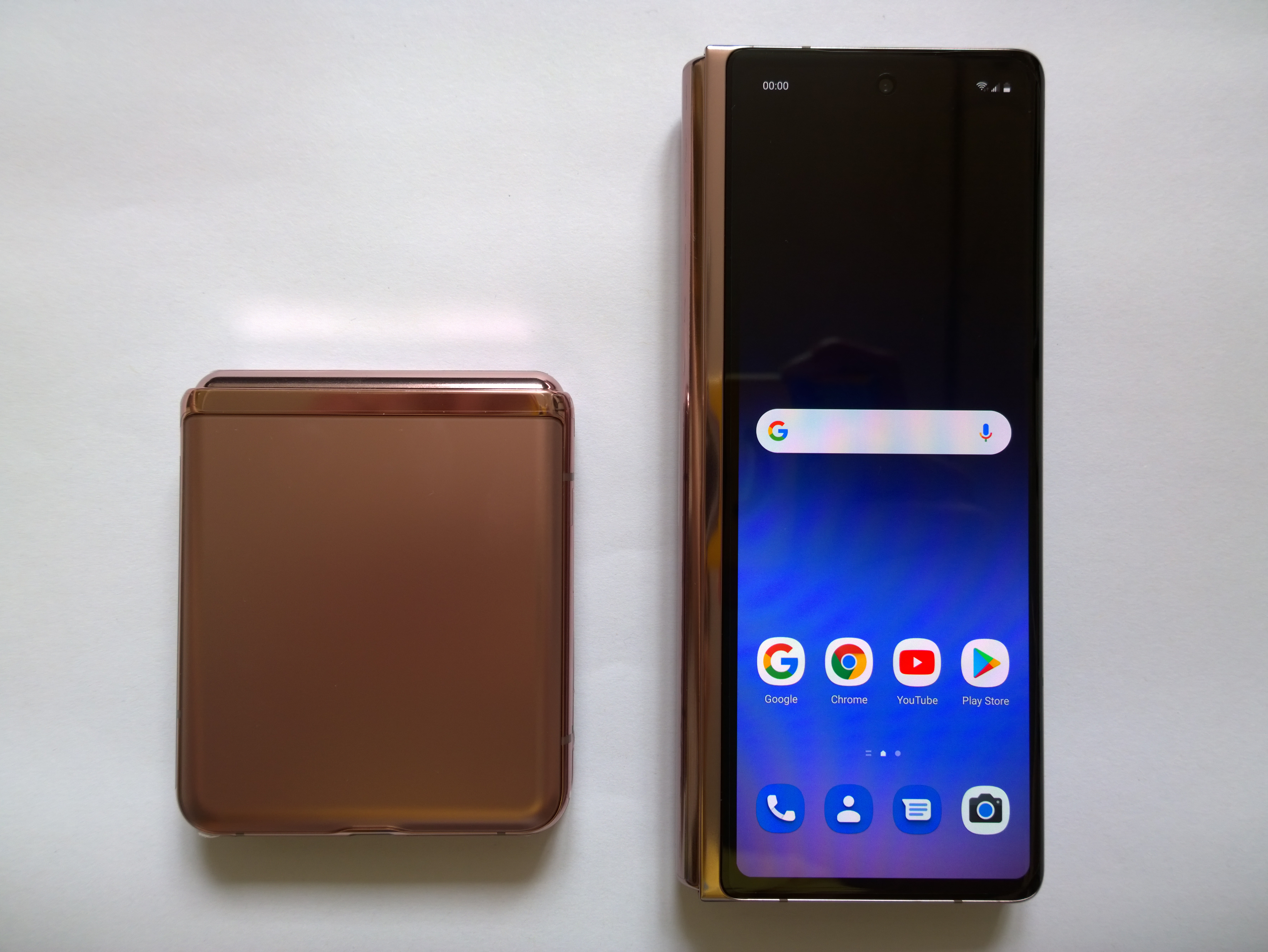
Galaxy Z Fold 2 & Z Flip when folded

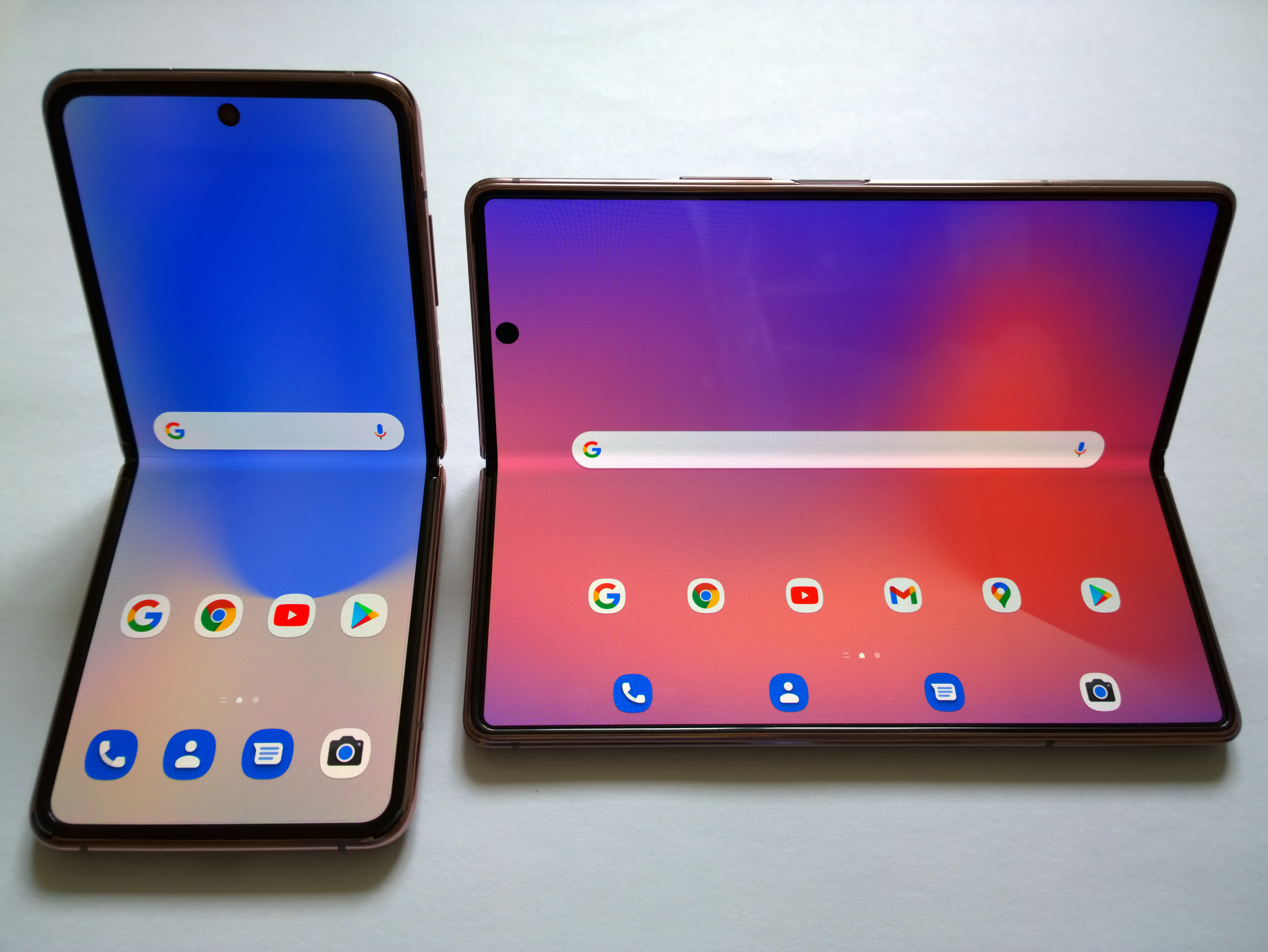
Galaxy Z Fold 2 & Z Flip when opened

== See also ==
- Samsung Galaxy Z series
- Samsung Galaxy Z Flip

Preceded by Samsung Galaxy Fold	Samsung Galaxy Z Fold 2; 2020	Succeeded by Samsung Galaxy Z Fold 3
