= Samsung Pay =

Mobile payment and digital wallet service

- Developer: Samsung Electronics
- Release: August 20, 2015; 11 years ago
- Operating system: Android; Wear OS
- Platform: Selected Samsung Galaxy smartphones & Galaxy Watch smartwatches
- License: Proprietary
- Website: samsung.com/samsung-pay

Samsung Pay is a mobile payment and digital wallet service, operated by the South Korean company Samsung Electronics. It lets users make payments using compatible smartphones and other Samsung-produced devices, accessed using the Samsung Wallet app.

First launched in 2015, the service supports contactless payments using near-field communications (NFC), but also supports magnetic strip-only payment terminals by incorporating magnetic secure transmission (MST) in devices released before 2021. In India, it also supports bill payments.

== Service ==
Samsung Pay was originally developed by the intellectual property of LoopPay, a crowdfunded startup company that Samsung acquired in February 2015 for an estimated $300m, one of the largest acquisitions made by the firm. The service supports both NFC-based mobile payment systems (which are prioritized when support is detected), as well as those that only support magnetic stripes. This is accomplished via a technology known as magnetic secure transmission (MST), which emulates the swipe of a permanent magnet strip past a reader by generating the near-field magnetic waveform directly. LoopPay's developers stated that because of this design, the technology would work with "nearly 90%" of all point-of-sale units in the United States (which excludes terminals that require the card to be physically inserted into a slot in order to function).

On phones, the Samsung Pay menu is launched by swiping from the bottom of the screen. Different credit, debit and loyalty cards can be loaded into the app, and selected by swiping between them on-screen.

In South Korea, Samsung Pay can be used for online payments and to withdraw money on selected banks' ATMs.

In Mainland China, Samsung Pay supports In-app payments, QR code payments (Alipay, and WeChat Pay) and public transportation cards of Beijing, Shanghai, Guangzhou, Shenzhen, and other cities.

In Hong Kong, Samsung Pay can be linked with Octopus cards, called Smart Octopus, to make electronic payments with stored value service for payments in online or offline systems.

In India, Samsung Pay supports Unified Payments Interface (UPI) and BharatQR, but for bank accounts only, not via credit cards like Google Pay. It also supports bill payments via the Bharat Bill Payment System (BBPS).

In May 2020, Samsung Pay unveiled Samsung Money by SoFi, a mobile-first money management experience that makes available a cash management account and accompanying Mastercard debit card via the Samsung Pay app, in partnership with fintech company SoFi.

In June 2022, Samsung Pay was renamed to Samsung Wallet in the US, UK, France, Germany, Italy, and Spain. Along with the renaming came new features such as the ability to store digital assets and digital keys within the Wallet app. These new features also came to the Samsung Pay app in South Korea, despite it not adopting the new "Samsung Wallet" name.

In Saudi Arabia, Samsung Wallet also supports adding Mada cards in addition to Visa and Mastercard, Mada which is the Saudi Payments Network is a major payment system in Saudi Arabia

In the United Arab Emirates, Samsung Wallet supports Jaywan cards in addition to Visa and Mastercard.

== Security ==
Samsung Pay's security measures are based on Samsung Knox and ARM TrustZone technologies; credit card information is stored in a secure token. Payments must be authenticated using a fingerprint scan or passcode.

In August 2016, security researcher Salvador Mendoza disclosed a potential flaw with Samsung Pay, arguing that its security tokens were not sufficiently randomized and could become predictable. He also designed a handheld device that could be used to skim magnetic secure transmission tokens, and another which could spoof magnetic stripes on actual card readers using the token. Samsung responded to the report, stating that "If at any time there is a potential vulnerability, we will act promptly to investigate and resolve the issue".

Samsung Pay will not work with devices that have compromised Knox security.

== Availability ==
Global availability of Samsung Pay

=== Supported countries ===
Date (in chronological order)	Support for payment cards issued in
August 20, 2015	South Korea
September 28, 2015	United States (Note: except American Samoa, Guam, Northern Mariana Islands, Puerto Rico and US Virgin Islands)
March 29, 2016	China
June 2, 2016	Spain
June 15, 2016	Australia
June 16, 2016	Singapore
July 13, 2016	Puerto Rico
July 19, 2016	Brazil
September 28, 2016	Russia (Note: As of March 2022, Samsung Pay for Mastercard and Visa is disabled in Russia because of international sanctions imposed for the 2022 Russian invasion of Ukraine and due to financial uncertainty in Russia. Since April 2024, Mir cards have been removed from Samsung Pay, leaving Samsung Wallet active in Russia without Samsung Pay.)
November 8, 2016	Canada
February 24, 2017	Malaysia
March 22, 2017	India
April 27, 2017	Sweden
April 27, 2017	United Arab Emirates
May 16, 2017	United Kingdom (Note: includes Isle of Man and Jersey, except British Overseas Territories)
May 23, 2017	Liechtenstein
May 23, 2017	Switzerland
May 23, 2017	Taiwan
May 25, 2017	Hong Kong
September 28, 2017	Vietnam
November 15, 2017	Belarus (Note: Only the enrollment of cards issued by non-sanctioned banks)
March 22, 2018	Italy
March 22, 2018	San Marino
March 22, 2018	Vatican City
April 26, 2018	France (Note: includes Guadeloupe, French Guiana, French Southern and Antarctic Lands, Martinique, Réunion, Saint Barthélemy, Saint Martin and Saint Pierre and Miquelon)
April 26, 2018	Monaco
August 21, 2018	South Africa
March 23, 2019	Indonesia
January 21, 2020	Kazakhstan
September 20, 2020	Kuwait
October 28, 2020	Germany
August 23, 2022	Qatar
October 31, 2022	Denmark
October 31, 2022	Finland
October 31, 2022	Norway
December 11, 2022	Bahrain
April 28, 2024	Oman
December 9, 2024	Saudi Arabia
February 25, 2025	Japan
October 27, 2025	Poland
July 8, 2026	Greece
July 22, 2026	Mongolia
October 5, 2026	Peru

In May 2016, it was reported that Samsung was developing a spin-off of the service known as Samsung Pay Mini. This service will be used for online payments only, and is also being targeted as a multi-platform service. It was also confirmed in January 2017 to work on other non-Samsung Android phones as well. It was officially launched on June 2017, first made available on Galaxy J7 Max/On Max phones (in India).

Availability is limited not just on the basis of where the payment card is issued, but also on the basis of the phone's country-specific code (CSC). Thus, a phone made for an unsupported region can never use Samsung Pay even if it physically resides in a supported region and has a local SIM card.

In June 2020, Samsung announced a partnership between Samsung Pay, Curve and Mastercard for the launch of Samsung Pay Card in the UK and more EE countries where Curve has customers, which was later launched on August 18, 2020.

In September 2021, Samsung Pay Mini was made available for the Galaxy A and Galaxy M series.

== Devices ==
=== Current series ===
Supported devices
Galaxy S series	Galaxy Z series	Galaxy A series	Galaxy M series	Galaxy Wearables
Galaxy S6 series; Galaxy S7 series; Galaxy S8 series; Galaxy S9 series; Galaxy S10 series; Galaxy S20 series; Galaxy S21 series; Galaxy S22 series; Galaxy S23 series; Galaxy S24 series; Galaxy S25 series; Galaxy S26 series	Galaxy Fold; Galaxy Z Flip/Flip 5G; Galaxy Z Fold 2; Galaxy Z Fold 3/Z Flip 3; Galaxy Z Fold 4/Z Flip 4; Galaxy Z Fold 5/Z Flip 5; Galaxy Z Fold 6/Z Flip 6; Galaxy Z Fold 7/Z Flip 7, 7 FE; Galaxy Z Fold 8/ Fold 8 Ultra/Z Flip 8	2016 variants of the Galaxy A5, A7, A8, A9 and A9 Pro; 2017 variants of the Galaxy A3, A5, and A7; Galaxy A6 / A6+; Galaxy A8 (2018)/A8 Star; Galaxy A7 (2018) and A9 (2018); Galaxy A14, A15, A16, A17; Galaxy A21, A22, A23, A24, A25, A26, A27; Galaxy A30, A31, A32, A33, A34, A35, A36, A37; Galaxy A40, A40s, A42; Galaxy A50, A51, A52, A53, A54, A55, A56, A57; Galaxy A70, A71, A72, A73; Galaxy A80; Galaxy A90	Galaxy M15, M16; Galaxy M22, M23; Galaxy M31, M32, M33, M34, M35, M36; M42; Galaxy M52, M53, M54, M55, M56; M62	Gear S2, Gear S3; Gear Sport; Galaxy Watch, Watch Active, Watch Active2; Galaxy Watch3, Watch4, Watch5, Watch6, Watch7, Watch8, Watch9; Watch FE; Watch Ultra, Watch Ultra2
Note: Italicized device names signify support for MST technology on all or select device variants.

=== Former series ===
==== Galaxy Note ====
- Samsung Galaxy Note5
- Samsung Galaxy Note7
- Samsung Galaxy Note FE
- Samsung Galaxy Note8
- Samsung Galaxy Note9
- Samsung Galaxy Note10 (NFC only for Note 10 Lite)
- Samsung Galaxy Note20

==== Galaxy J ====
- Samsung Galaxy J5 & J7 (2016)
- Samsung Galaxy J5 Prime (Mini)
- Samsung Galaxy J7 Prime (Mini)
- Samsung Galaxy J5 (2017)/J5 Pro
- Samsung Galaxy J7 (2017)/J7 Pro
- Samsung Galaxy J7 Max (Mini)
- Samsung Galaxy J7 Duo (Mini)

==== Galaxy C and others ====
- Samsung Galaxy C5 and C5 Pro
- Samsung Galaxy C7 and C7 Pro
- Samsung Galaxy C9 and C9 Pro
- Samsung Galaxy On5 (2016)
- Samsung Galaxy On7 (2016) (also known as Galaxy J7 Prime in other countries)
- Samsung Galaxy On Max
- Samsung Galaxy Quantum2 (NFC and MST)
- Samsung W2017 (non-Galaxy smartphone)
- Samsung W2018 (non-Galaxy smartphone)

== See also ==
- Samsung Wallet
- Google Wallet
- Apple Wallet
