= Samsung Galaxy Glasses =

2026 product by Samsung Electronics

- Brand: Samsung Galaxy
- Manufacturer: Samsung Electronics
- First released: November 2026; 0 months ago
- Operating system: Android XR with One UI XR
- System-on-chip: Qualcomm’s Snapdragon AR1 Gen 1

The Samsung Galaxy Glasses is an upcoming product designed, developed, manufactured, and marketed by Samsung Electronics, as the part of the Samsung Galaxy series. It was announced on July 22, 2026 at the Samsung's Galaxy Unpacked event held in London, England, alongside the Galaxy Z Flip 8, Galaxy Z Fold 8 series, and the Galaxy Watch 9 series, and it is going to run Android and One UI XR, which it will run the Android XR platform, and it will be released in November 2026.

== History ==
In April 2026, CAD renders for the Galaxy Glasses and the codename “Jinju” were leaked via Android Headlines online ahead of its unveiling.

In May 2026, it was reported that Samsung would unveil the Galaxy Glasses on July 22, 2026 in London, England. Soon after, Google and Samsung unveiled the Galaxy Glasses at Google I/O.

The Samsung Galaxy Glasses App was leaked in June 2026, which showcases a Warby Parker frame design and key features.

A day before its official unveiling, Android Authority reported about the specifications for the glasses.

The Samsung Galaxy Glasses was announced during the Samsung's Galaxy Unpacked event in London, England, on July 22, 2026. The glasses will be able to take calls, listen to music, and capture photos. The glasses will have a 9-hour battery life, and it would be released in fall 2026. In October 2026, The Korea Herald reported that Samsung would launch the Galaxy Glasses in November, following approval by the Federal Communications Commission in September.
