= Samsung Galaxy S26 =

2026 flagship smartphones by Samsung Electronics

Samsung Galaxy S26 series

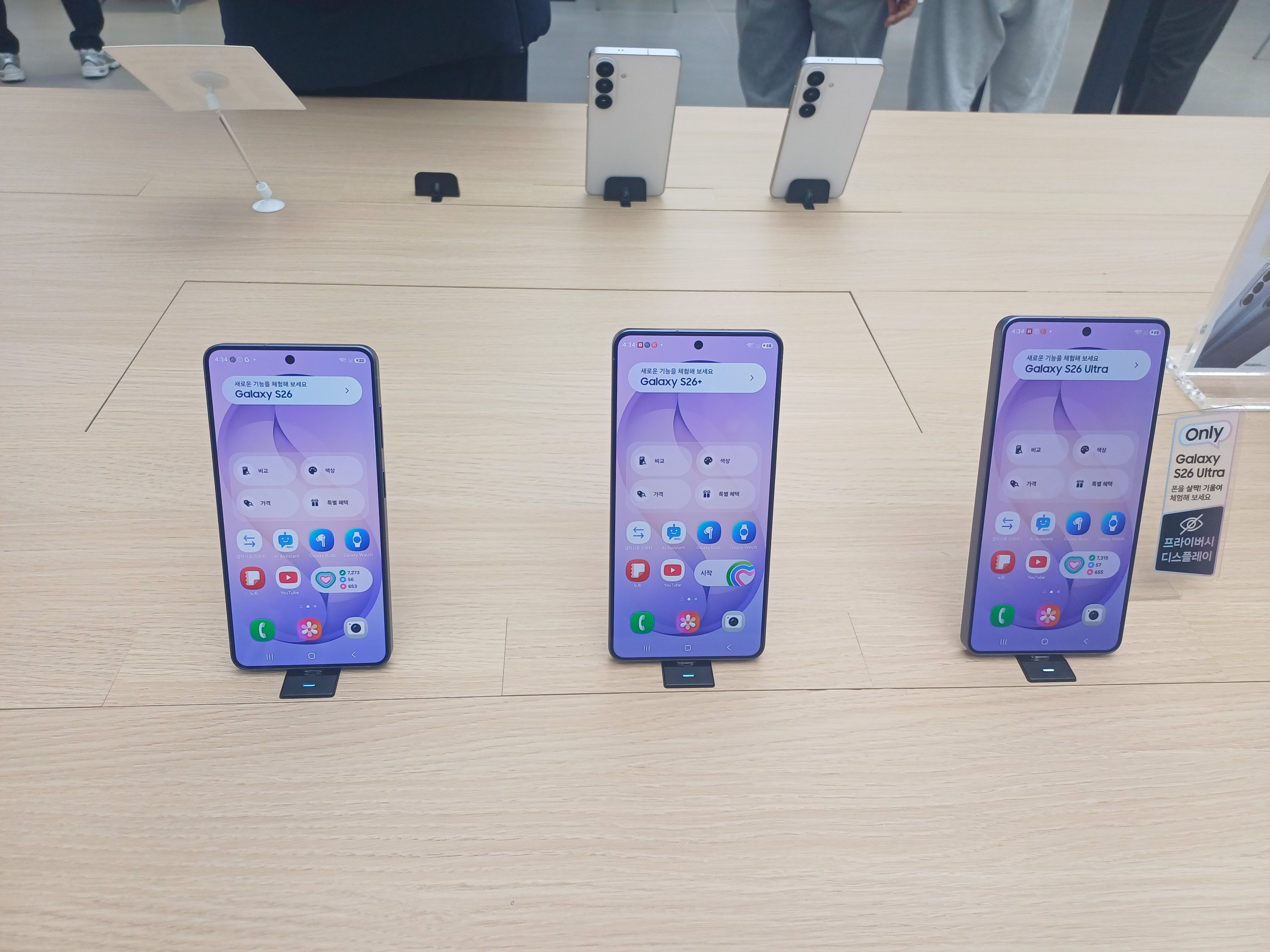
- Samsung Galaxy S26 series
- Brand: Samsung
- Manufacturer: Samsung Electronics
- Type: Smartphone
- Series: Galaxy S
- Family: Samsung Galaxy
- First released: S26, S26+ and S26 Ultra: March 11, 2026; 8 months ago S26 FE: September 4, 2026; 2 months ago
- Availability by region: S26, S26+ and S26 Ultra: March 11, 2026; 8 months ago S26 FE: September 4, 2026; 2 months ago
- Predecessor: Samsung Galaxy S25
- Related: Samsung Galaxy Z Fold 8 Samsung Galaxy Z Flip 8
- Compatible networks: GSM CDMA 2G, HSDPA CDMA2000 3G, 4G LTE, 5G
- Form factor: Slate
- Colors: Cobalt Violet; Sky Blue; Black; White; Silver Shadow; Pink Gold
- Dimensions: S26: H: 149.6 mm (5.89 in), W: 71.7 mm (2.82 in), D: 7.2 mm (0.28 in); S26+: H: 158.4 mm (6.24 in), W: 75.8 mm (2.98 in), D: 7.3 mm (0.29 in); S26 Ultra: H: 163.6 mm (6.44 in), W: 78.1 mm (3.07 in), D: 7.9 mm (0.31 in); S26 FE: H: 161.6 mm (6.36 in), W: 76.9 mm (3.03 in), D: 7.4 mm (0.29 in)
- Weight: S26: 167 g (5.9 oz); S26+: 190 g (6.7 oz); S26 Ultra: 214 g (7.5 oz); S26 FE: 193 g (6.8 oz)
- Operating system: Original: All except S26 FE: Android 16 with One UI 8.5; S26 FE: Android 17 with One UI 9.0; Current: All: Android 17 with One UI 9.0
- System-on-chip: S26 & S26+ (US, China) & S26 Ultra: Qualcomm Snapdragon 8 Elite Gen 5 (3 nm); S26 & S26+ (worldwide): Samsung Exynos 2600 (2 nm); S26 FE: Samsung Exynos 2500
- GPU: S26 & S26+ (US, China) & S26 Ultra (worldwide): Adreno 840; S26 & S26+ (worldwide): Xclipse 960; S26 FE: Adreno 840
- Storage: S26 & S26+: 256, 512 GB; S26 Ultra: 256, 512 GB, 1 TB; S26 FE: 128, 256, 512 GB; UFS 4.0
- Battery: S26: 4300 mAh; S26+, S26 FE: 4900 mAh; S26 Ultra: 5000 mAh
- Charging: S26: 25W Super Fast Charging; 15W Fast Wireless Charging; S26+: 45W Super Fast Charging; 20W Fast Wireless Charging; S26 Ultra: 60W Super Fast Charging; 25W Fast Wireless Charging; S26 FE: Super fast charging 2.0 at 45W; All: Qi2 wireless charging at up to 15W; Reverse charging at 4.5W (wired and wireless); All: 4.5W Reverse Wireless Charging
- Connectivity: Wi-Fi 7, NFC
- Data inputs: S Pen (S26 Ultra)
- Website: Galaxy S26 & S26+ Galaxy S26 Ultra; Galaxy S26 FE

The Samsung Galaxy S26 is a series of flagship Android-based smartphones manufactured, developed, and marketed by Samsung Electronics as part of its flagship Galaxy S series. They collectively serve as the successor to the Galaxy S25 series released in 2025. The S26, S26+, and S26 Ultra were announced on February 25, 2026, at Samsung's Galaxy Unpacked event in San Francisco, alongside the Galaxy Buds 4 series, and were released on March 11, 2026, while the Galaxy S26 FE was announced on August 27, 2026, and was subsequently released on September 4, 2026.

The Galaxy S26 series were an evolution of the prior year's series, with upgraded hardware and design refinements. Succeeding the S25, S25+, S25 Ultra and S25 Edge respectively, the S26 was produced in a standard model with a display size of 6.3-inch (160 mm), the S26+ has a larger 6.7 in (170 mm) display and the S26 Ultra has a larger 6.9 in (175 mm) display. The latter still has the S Pen and its dedicated slot, but introduces a new hardware-level technology called the Privacy Display, the first smartphone in the world to have a feature that decreases screen visibility from certain angles for enhanced privacy.

== History ==
=== Galaxy S26 ===
Before its official announcement, rumors about the Galaxy S26 began to surface as early as July 2025, where it would be produced in three different versions: a Galaxy S26 Pro, an S26 Edge, and an S26 Ultra. First builds of One UI 8.5 based on Android 16 for the Galaxy S26 series were also spotted.

In October 2025, reports indicating that Samsung would cancel the Galaxy S26 Edge due to poor sales of the Galaxy S25 Edge. Reports also confirm that the Galaxy S26 Pro would be known as the standard Galaxy S26, while the Galaxy S26+ would launch next year. Soon after, reports suggested that the Galaxy S26 launch would be delayed due to the cancellation of the S26 Edge, along with development issues with the line-up.

In November 2025, reports confirm that the Galaxy S26 series would be unveiled on February 25, 2026, in San Francisco. In January 2026, reports suggested that the Galaxy S26 series would be available on March 11, 2026. In addition, renders of the supposed devices, alongside alleged specs, were also reported. A week before its launch, a picture was posted showing the actual Galaxy S26+ that was listed for sale on Craigslist.

The Galaxy S26 series was announced during the Samsung's Galaxy Unpacked event in San Francisco on February 25, 2026, with its introduction of a Privacy Display, along with 60W Super Fast Charging 3.0 and a slightly thinner build on the Galaxy S26 Ultra. It is currently the thinnest Ultra Samsung has made on its S-series Pre-orders began on that same day and were made available on March 11, 2026, in multiple countries.

=== Galaxy S26 FE ===
Development of the Galaxy S26 FE began shortly after the announcement of the Galaxy S26 series, with first signs of the S26 FE's existence were surfaced in the GSMA database in March 2026. In June 2026, pictures were shown, showing the actual Galaxy S26 FE ahead of its unveiling, along with early wallpapers for the phone soon after. In late-July 2026, Samsung confirms the existence of the Galaxy S26 FE in its quarterly earnings call.

In August 2026, reports confirm that the Galaxy S26 FE would launch on September 4, 2026. In addition, firmware for the S26 FE, as well as color options for the phone and renders of the supposed devices were revealed ahead of launch. The S26 FE was approved by the Federal Communications Commission (FCC) that same month.

On August 19, 2026, invitations to Galaxy Unpacked was sent to media outlets with the teaser saying "August 27, 2026", which the company did not explain the subject of the event, but it was widely expected to announce the Galaxy S26 FE.

The Samsung Galaxy S26 FE was announced on August 27, 2026, which was the newest addition to the Galaxy S26 family, and it serves as the successor to the Galaxy S25 FE.

== Line-up ==
The Galaxy S26 series currently includes four models: the Galaxy S26, Galaxy S26+, Galaxy S26 FE and the Galaxy S26 Ultra.

=== Dimensions ===
The Galaxy S26 features a flat 6.3 in (160 mm) display (a slight increase from its predecessor). The Galaxy S26+ and Galaxy S26 Ultra offer similar internal hardware and screen sizes to its predecessor, at 6.7 in (170 mm) and 6.9 in (180 mm), respectively.

Galaxy S26 series dimensions
Model	Thickness	Weight
Galaxy S26	7.2 mm	167 g
Galaxy S26+	7.3 mm	190 g
Galaxy S26 Ultra	7.9 mm	214 g
Galaxy S26 FE	7.4 mm	193 g

=== Performance ===
The Galaxy S26 series (except for the S26 FE) reintroduces chipset split: the Snapdragon 8 Elite Gen 5 for Galaxy powers the S26 and S26+ in North America, China, and Japan, while the Exynos 2600 for the rest of the global markets. The S26 Ultra, however, will use the same Snapdragon 8 Elite Gen 5 for Galaxy chipset as standard worldwide.

The Galaxy S26 FE uses the Exynos 2500 chipset worldwide (which was first used on the Galaxy Z Flip 7).

== Design ==
The S26, S26+, and S26 FE smartphones continue to have an aluminum body and a glass back, similar to the design of their predecessors. The S26, S26+, and S26 FE use Gorilla Glass Victus 2 for both the front display and rear glass panels.

The S26 Ultra brought back the aluminium frame (which was last used on the Galaxy S23), but still features a glass back; however, the phone now features more rounded corners. It still has the Gorilla Glass Armor 2 for its front display and rear panel.

Model	Galaxy S26 FE	Galaxy S26 and S26+	Galaxy S26 Ultra
Base colors	Graphite; Blueberry; Pistachio	Black; Cobalt Violet; Sky Blue; White	
Online exclusive colors	—N/a	Silver Shadow; Pink Gold	

== Specifications ==
=== Display ===
The Galaxy S26 series features a Dynamic LTPO AMOLED 2X display across all models except the Samsung Galaxy S26 FE that utilizes an LTPS panel. All models come with HDR10+ support and a 120 Hz refresh rate, reaching up to 2600 nits. Except the S26 FE which only gets up to 1900nits. Each device also includes an ultrasonic in-screen fingerprint sensor, except the S26 FE which uses an optical sensor. The S26 Ultra uses Corning’s Gorilla Armor 2 protection on the front, while the S26, and S26+ use Gorilla Glass Victus 2 on both the front and back panels. Except for the S26 FE which uses Gorilla Glass Victus+.

==== Privacy Display ====
Demonstration of the Privacy Display feature for the Galaxy S26 Ultra

The Galaxy S26 Ultra features the Privacy Display, a display technology developed and supplied by Samsung Display. The technology was originally developed under the name Flex Magic Pixel. When the feature is enabled in device settings, the viewing angle of the screen becomes significantly narrower, making the display difficult to see from the side while appearing normal to the user.

The feature serves a similar purpose as external privacy screen protectors used to prevent others from viewing a phone screen in public places. However, unlike privacy films that add an additional polarizing layer on top of the display and may reduce brightness or clarity, Privacy Display is implemented at the panel level during manufacturing by selectively applying polarization to specific display elements.

It can also be enabled or disabled through software as needed. The feature can be applied only to specific areas of the display, such as notification pop-ups, or to certain applications where privacy protection is needed.

Specification	Galaxy S26 FE	Galaxy S26	Galaxy S26+	Galaxy S26 Ultra
Size	6.7 in (170 mm)	6.3 in (160 mm)	6.7 in (170 mm)	6.9 in (175 mm)
Resolution	2340×1080		3120×1440	
ProScaler	No		Yes	
Density	~385 ppi	~411 ppi	~516 ppi	~500 ppi
Aspect Ratio	19.5:9			
Refresh rate	60 Hz / 120 Hz	1 Hz to 120 Hz		
Brightness	~1900 nits	~2600 nits		
Panel	Dynamic AMOLED 2X (LTPS)	Dynamic AMOLED 2X (LTPO)		
Cover glass	Gorilla Glass Victus 2			Gorilla Armor 2
Privacy Display	No			Yes

=== Camera ===
The Galaxy S26 and S26+ maintains the same triple rear camera setup and hardware specifications unchanged from its predecessors: a 50 MP wide‑angle main camera, a 12 MP ultrawide camera, and a 10 MP telephoto camera with 3× optical zoom, alongside a 12 MP front‑facing camera.

The Galaxy S26 FE also maintains a triple rear camera system similar to its predecessor: 50 MP wide‑angle main camera, a 12 MP ultrawide camera (albeit with a change in camera sensor), and a 8 MP telephoto camera with 3× optical zoom, alongside a 12 MP front‑facing camera.

The Galaxy S26 Ultra features a quad‑camera system: 200 MP wide-angle camera, a 50 MP ultrawide camera, a 10 MP 3× telephoto, and a 50 MP periscope telephoto with 5× optical zoom. Compared to the Galaxy S25 Ultra, aperture for the primary wide and 5× telephoto now have a larger aperture (from f/1.7 to f/1.4 and from f/3.4 to f/2.9, respectively). It is also the first Galaxy S Ultra model to use the All Lens On Prism (ALoP) mechanism (for the 5× telephoto camera), instead of the traditional periscope lens mechanism found in previous models.

On the software side, all models support ProVisual Engine for image processing and include a Horizon Lock option within the Super Steady video stabilization mode. Horizon Lock keeps the horizon level cosnistent during video recording when the device is tilted or rotated. The mode supports recording at resolutions of up to 4K. The Galaxy S26 FE also features the My FanCam feature (which first debuted on the Galaxy Z Fold 8), which also made its way to the other S26 models through its One UI 9.0 update.

Camera		Galaxy S26 FE	Galaxy S26	Galaxy S26+	Galaxy S26 Ultra
Rear	Wide	50 MP (f/1.8)			200 MP (f/1.4)
Rear	Ultra-wide	12 MP (120° FOV)			50 MP (120° FOV)
Rear	Telephoto	8 MP (3×) (f/2.4)	10 MP (3×) (f/2.4)		
Rear	Periscope Telephoto	—N/a			50 MP (5×) (f/2.9)
Front camera		12 MP (f/2.2)			
Additional features		Sensor-size & pixel-binning Super Steady mode (with Horizon Lock); My FanCam	Sensor-size & pixel-binning Super Steady mode (with Horizon Lock); My FanCam (since One UI 9.0 update)		Space Zoom (up to 100×); Sensor-size & pixel-binning Super Steady mode (with Horizon Lock); My FanCam (since One UI 9.0 update)
All models support 8K video recording at up to 30 fps.

=== Batteries ===
The Galaxy S26 models have similar battery capacities to the S25 series, except for the smallest model (which now has a slight increase of 300 mAh). For the first time in the series, each of the three devices now offer a distinct wired charging speed: the S26 supports up to 25 W, the S26+/S26 FE accepts 45 W, and the S26 Ultra arrives to 60 W, with the latter marking the highest wired charging speed ever featured on a Galaxy smartphone.

All three support Qi2.2 inductive charging up to 25 W, and can charge other Qi-compatible devices wirelessly using battery power. Although the devices support Qi 2.2, they lack built-in magnets (required by the Qi standard), due to potential interference with the vertical camera array (on the three devices) and the S Pen on the Galaxy S26 Ultra.

	Galaxy S26 FE	Galaxy S26	Galaxy S26+	Galaxy S26 Ultra
Battery capacity	4,900 mAh	4,300 mAh	4,900 mAh	5,000 mAh
Wired charging speed	45 W	25 W	45 W	60 W
Qi2 wireless charging speed	15W / 20W			25 W
Reverse wireless charging speed	4.5 W			
Ref.				

=== Memory and storage ===
Like its predecessor, all Galaxy S26 models were launched with 12 GB of RAM (8 GB of RAM for S26 FE). The Galaxy S26 now start at 256 GB, dropping the 128 GB option previously available. The 1 TB version of the S26 Ultra has 16 GB of RAM, and is available worldwide.

Model	Memory	Storage options	Storage type
Galaxy S26 FE	8 GB	128 GB / 256 GB / 512 GB	UFS 4.0
Galaxy S26	12 GB	256 GB / 512 GB	UFS 4.0
Galaxy S26+	12 GB	256 GB / 512 GB	UFS 4.0
Galaxy S26 Ultra	12 GB / 16 GB (for 1 TB version)	256 GB / 512 GB / 1 TB	UFS 4.0
Ref.			

=== Connectivity ===
All models in the Galaxy S26 series, support 5G connectivity, Wi-Fi 7 (Wi-Fi 6E for S26 FE), Bluetooth 6.0 (5.4 for S26 FE and S26), NFC, and USB Type-C 3.2 (for the S26, S26+, and S26 Ultra) for data transfer and charging. Ultra-Wideband (UWB) is supported only on the S26+ and S26 Ultra models. For the first time since the Galaxy S10 Lite, the Galaxy S26 FE uses an older USB Type-C 2.0 port.

Model	Wi-Fi	Bluetooth	UWB	USB	NFC
Galaxy S26 FE	Wi-Fi 6E	5.4	No	USB-C 2.0	Yes
Galaxy S26	Wi-Fi 7	5.4	No	USB-C 3.2 (5Gbps)	Yes
Galaxy S26+	Wi-Fi 7	6.0	Yes	USB-C 3.2 (5Gbps)	Yes
Galaxy S26 Ultra	Wi-Fi 7	6.0	Yes	USB-C 3.2 (5Gbps)	Yes
Ref.					

== Software ==
The Galaxy S26, S26+ and S26 Ultra came pre-installed with Android 16 and Samsung's custom One UI 8.5 software overlay and Samsung has promised 7 years of security patches and OS upgrades, which is similar to the previous flagships, the S24 and S25 series, eventually ceasing to receive updates in 2033, while the S26 FE came pre-installed with Android 17 and Samsung's custom One UI 9 software overlay and it will receive updates also until 2033.

	Pre-installed OS	OS upgrades history							End of support
	Pre-installed OS	1st	2nd	3rd	4th	5th	6th	7th	End of support
S26; S26+ S26 Ultra	Android 16 (One UI 8.5)	Android 17 (One UI 9.0); September 2026							Within 2033
S26 FE	Android 17 (One UI 9.0)								Within 2033

== Reception ==
The Verge praised the Galaxy S26 Ultra in its review for its new Privacy Display feature and camera improvements while criticizing its high price. IGN described it as, in many ways, "the exact same phone as the S25 Ultra, just with a slightly faster processor", and praised its display and battery life while criticizing its "lackluster gaming performance" and the Privacy Display feature's washed out colors.

== Notes ==
Preceded by Samsung Galaxy S25	Samsung Galaxy S26; 2026	Succeeded by Current
