= Samsung Galaxy Watch 8 =

2025 smartwatch by Samsung Electronics

Samsung Galaxy Watch 8 Samsung Galaxy Watch 8 Classic Samsung Galaxy Watch Ultra 2025
- Brand: Samsung
- Manufacturer: Samsung Electronics
- Type: Smartwatch
- Series: Galaxy Watch
- Family: Samsung Galaxy
- First released: July 9, 2025; 16 months ago
- Availability by region: July 25, 2025; 15 months ago
- Discontinued: July 22, 2026; 3 months ago
- Predecessor: Samsung Galaxy Watch 7
- Successor: Samsung Galaxy Watch 9
- Colors: Galaxy Watch 8: Graphite, Silver; Galaxy Watch 8 Classic: Black, White; Galaxy Watch Ultra 2025: Titanium Blue, Titanium Gray, Titanium Silver, Titanium White
- Operating system: Original: Wear OS 6.0 with One UI Watch 8.0 Current: Wear OS 7.0 with One UI Watch 9.0
- Storage: 32 GB, 64 GB
- Codename: Fresh 8
- Website: Galaxy Watch 8 Galaxy Watch 8 Classic; Galaxy Watch Ultra 2025

The Samsung Galaxy Watch 8 (stylized as Samsung Galaxy Watch8) is a series of Wear OS-based smartwatches developed and marketed by Samsung Electronics. It was officially announced on July 9, 2025, at the Samsung's Galaxy Unpacked event held in Brooklyn, New York City, United States, alongside the Galaxy Z Fold 7, the Galaxy Z Flip 7 and its FE-based model, as well as the Samsung Galaxy Watch 8 Classic and Galaxy Watch Ultra 2025.

== Specifications ==
Specification	Galaxy Watch8		Galaxy Watch8 Classic	Galaxy Watch Ultra (2025)
Size	40 mm	44 mm	46 mm	47 mm
Model numbers	SM-L320 (Bluetooth); SM-L325 (LTE)	SM-L330 (Bluetooth); SM-L335 (LTE)	SM-L500 (Bluetooth); SM-L505 (LTE)	SM-L705 (LTE)
Colors	Graphite, Silver		Black, White	Titanium Blue, Titanium Silver, Titanium Gray, Titanium White
Display	1.34" (34.0 mm); Super AMOLED	1.47" (37.3 mm); Super AMOLED	1.34" (34.0 mm); Super AMOLED	1.50" (38.1 mm); Super AMOLED
Resolution	438×438 pixels	480×480 pixels	438×438 pixels	480×480 pixels
Glass	Sapphire crystal			
Chassis material	Armor aluminum		Stainless steel	Grade 4 titanium
Processor	Exynos W1000 (3 nm, 5-core: 1×Cortex-A78 @ 1.6 GHz + 4×Cortex-A55 @ 1.5 GHz)			
Operating system	Wear OS 6.0 (based on Android 16)			
User interface	One UI Watch 8.0			
Dimensions (excluding sensor)	40.4 × 42.7 × 8.6 mm	43.7 × 46.0 × 8.6 mm	46.4 × 46.0 × 10.6 mm	47.1 × 47.4 × 12.1 mm
Weight (without strap)	30 g	34 g	63.5 g	60.5 g
Strap size	20 mm		22 mm	26 mm
Water resistance	IP68 + 5 ATM + MIL-STD-810H			IP68 + 10 ATM + MIL-STD-810H
Memory	2 GB RAM, 32 GB storage		2 GB RAM, 64 GB storage	
Battery	325 mAh	435 mAh	445 mAh	590 mAh
Connectivity	4G LTE (optional); Bluetooth 5.3 (A2DP, LE); Wi-Fi 802.11 a/b/g/n (2.4 + 5 GHz); Near Field Communication (NFC)			
