= Samsung Galaxy Watch series =

Line of smartwatches by Samsung Electronics

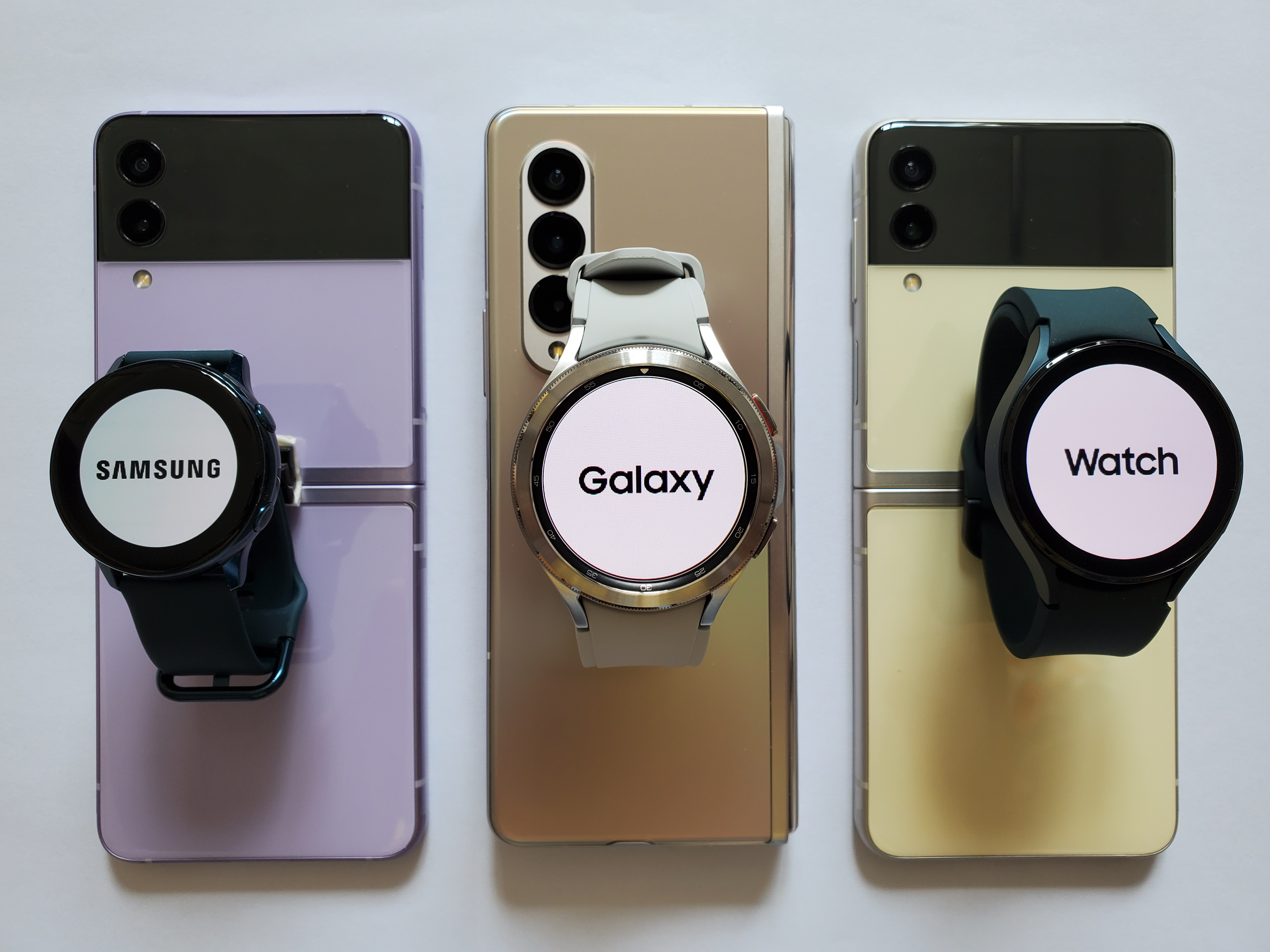
- Samsung Galaxy Watch
- Developer: Samsung Electronics
- Product family: Samsung Galaxy
- Type: Smartwatches
- Released: August 24, 2018; 8 years ago
- Operating system: Tizen (until Samsung Galaxy Watch 3); Wear OS (since Samsung Galaxy Watch 4)
- System on a chip: Samsung Exynos (2018–2025); Qualcomm Snapdragon (2026–)
- Display: Rounded Super AMOLED
- Connectivity: Wi-Fi, Bluetooth, GPS, 3G/4G LTE
- Backward compatibility: Requires a smartphone running Android 10 or later and the Galaxy Wear app
- Predecessor: Samsung Gear
- Related: Samsung Galaxy Fit series Samsung Galaxy Buds series

Galaxy Watch series release timeline
2018	Samsung Galaxy Watch
2019	Samsung Galaxy Watch Active
2019	Samsung Galaxy Watch Active 2
2020	Samsung Galaxy Watch 3
2021	Samsung Galaxy Watch 4 / Watch 4 Classic
2022	Samsung Galaxy Watch 5 / Watch 5 Pro
2023	Samsung Galaxy Watch 6 / Watch 6 Classic
2024	Samsung Galaxy Watch FE
2024	Samsung Galaxy Watch 7
2024	Samsung Galaxy Watch Ultra
2025	Samsung Galaxy Watch 8 / Watch 8 Classic
2026	Samsung Galaxy Watch 9
2026	Samsung Galaxy Watch Ultra 2

The Samsung Galaxy Watch series is a line of smartwatches manufactured, designed and produced by Samsung Electronics. The line features various health, fitness, and fashion related features and is integrated with Samsung's other products under the Samsung Galaxy brand. The series is the successor to the previous Samsung Gear watches.

The first smartwatch under this series, the Galaxy Watch, was released in August 2018.

The Galaxy Watch series shares the circular form factor of the Samsung Gear S2 and S3, as a result much of the OS features are shared between the Gear S2 and S3 and the Galaxy Watch.

== Operating system ==
For the original Galaxy Watch, the Watch Active and Active 2 and the Watch 3, Samsung used its in-house developed Tizen OS, which it previously used for the Samsung Gear series of watches.

With the announcement of the Galaxy Watch 4 and Watch 4 Classic in August 2021, Samsung entered into a partnership with Google to work together on Wear OS bringing some features from Samsung's Tizen with One UI Watch to Wear OS, while other features remained exclusive to Samsung's own customization to the OS, despite the fact that Wear OS is closed-source.

== Specifications ==
=== Galaxy Watch ===
The baseline Galaxy Watch series started as the lower cost Galaxy Watch Active line. Unlike the original Galaxy Watch and Galaxy Watch3, these watches were missing the rotating bezel. The Active line put more focus on fitness and wellness. With the 4th generation, the “Active” label was dropped in favor of the form-factor becoming the base smartwatch in the series. The Galaxy Watch4 was used as the base for the Galaxy Watch FE in 2024.

The Watch 5 introduced a temperature sensor and added support for fast charging.

The Watch 6 had an increased battery capacity and increased RAM.

The Watch 7 had increased storage, an improved sensor, and support for faster charging.

The Watch 5 Pro and Watch Ultra are the only watches to support GPX routes.

Model		Watch Active	Watch Active 2		Watch 4		Watch 5		Watch 6		Watch 7		Watch 8		Watch 9	
Model		40 mm		44 mm	40 mm	44 mm	40 mm	44 mm	40 mm	44 mm	40 mm	44 mm	40 mm	44 mm	40 mm	44 mm
Support status		Unsupported			Supported											
Dates	Announced	20 February 2019	5 August 2019		11 August 2021		10 August 2022		26 July 2023		10 July 2024		9 July 2025		22 July 2026	
Dates	Released	8 March 2019	13 September 2019		27 August 2021		26 August 2022		11 August 2023		19 July 2024		25 July 2025		7 August 2026	
Model number		SM-R500	SM-R830; SM-R835 LTE	SM-R820; SM-R825 LTE	SM-R860; SM-R865 LTE	SM-R870; SM-R875 LTE	SM-R900; SM-R905 LTE	SM-R910; SM-R915 LTE	SM-R930; SM-R935 LTE	SM-R940; SM-R945 LTE	SM-L300; SM-L305 LTE	SM-L310; SM-L315 LTE	SM-L320; SM-L325 LTE	SM-L330; SM-L335 LTE		
OS	Initial	One UI Watch 1.0; Tizen 4.0.0.3	One UI Watch 1.2; Tizen 4.0.0.7		One UI Watch 3.0; Wear OS 3.0		One UI Watch 4.5; Wear OS 3.5		One UI Watch 5.0; Wear OS 4.0		One UI Watch 6.0; Wear OS 5.0		One UI Watch 8.0; Wear OS 6.0		One UI Watch 9.0; Wear OS 7.0	
OS	Latest	One UI Watch 2.0; Tizen 5.5.0.2			One UI Watch 8.0; Wear OS 6.0										One UI Watch 9.0; Wear OS 7.0	
Dimensions mm (in)	Height	39.5 (1.56)	40 (1.6)	44 (1.7)	40.4 (1.59)	44.4 (1.75)	40.4 (1.59)	44.4 (1.75)	38.8 (1.53)	42.8 (1.69)	40.4 (1.59)	44.4 (1.75)	40.4 (1.59)	43.7 (1.72)	40.4 (1.59)	43.7 (1.72)
Dimensions mm (in)	Width	39.5 (1.56)	40 (1.6)	44 (1.7)	39.3 (1.55)	43.3 (1.70)	39.3 (1.55)	43.3 (1.70)	40.4 (1.59)	42.8 (1.69)	40.4 (1.59)	44.4 (1.75)	42.7 (1.68)	46 (1.8)	42.7 (1.68)	46 (1.8)
Dimensions mm (in)	Depth	10.5 (0.41)	10.9 (0.43)		9.8 (0.39)		9.8 (0.39)		9 (0.35)		9.7 (0.38)		8.6 (0.34)			
Weight g (lb)		25 (0.055)	37 (0.082)	44 (0.097)	25.9 (0.057)	30.3 (0.067)	28.7 (0.063)	33.5 (0.074)	28.7 (0.063)	33.3 (0.073)	28.8 (0.063)	33.8 (0.075)	30 (0.066)	34 (0.075)	32 (0.071)	36 (0.079)
Colors																
Display	Size	1.1 in (28 mm)	1.19 in (30 mm)	1.39 in (35 mm)	1.19 in (30 mm)	1.39 in (35 mm)	1.19 in (30 mm)	1.39 in (35 mm)	1.31 in (33 mm)	1.46 in (37 mm)	1.31 in (33 mm)	1.46 in (37 mm)	1.34 in (34 mm)	1.47 in (37 mm)	1.34 in (34 mm)	1.47 in (37 mm)
Display	Resolution	360 x 360			396 x 396	450 x 450	396 x 396	450 x 450	432 x 432	480 x 480	432 x 432	480 x 480	438 x 438	480 x 480	438 x 438	480 x 480
Display	Type	Super AMOLED														
Display	Glass	Gorilla Glass 3	Gorilla Glass DX+				Sapphire crystal									
RAM		768 MB	768 MB; 1.5 GB		1.5 GB				2 GB							
Storage		4 GB			16 GB						32 GB					
Processor		Samsung; Exynos 9110			Samsung; Exynos W920				Samsung; Exynos W930		Samsung; Exynos W1000				Qualcomm; Snapdragon Wear Elite	
Connectivity	Wi-Fi	Wi-Fi 4													Wi-Fi 5	
Connectivity	Bluetooth	4.2	5.0				5.2		5.3		5.4				6.0	
Connectivity	Cellular	No	LTE optional													
Connectivity	NFC	Yes														
Connectivity	Positioning	GPS, GLONASS, GALILEO, BDS														
Battery	Capacity (mAh)	230	247	340	247	361	284	410	300	425	300	425	325	435	390	445
Sensors	Accelerometer	Yes														
Sensors	Gyroscope	Yes														
Sensors	Barometer	Yes														
Sensors	Electro-optical sensor	Yes														
Sensors	Photodetector	Yes														
Sensors	ECG	No	Yes													
Sensors	HRM	No			Yes											
Sensors	Blood oxygen monitor	No			Yes											
Sensors	Blood pressure monitor	No			Yes											
Sensors	Bioelectrical impedance analysis	No			Yes											
Sensors	Temperature	No					Yes									

=== Galaxy Watch Classic ===
The Galaxy Watch Classic line supersedes the Samsung Gear S2 and S3, inheriting the rotating bezel introduced with the Gear S2. For the first and third generation of the Galaxy Watch line, it functioned as the base smartwatch of the series. The classic line did not get a device in the second generation. However, as of the 4th generation, the original design was promoted to take on a more premium spot in the line-up. The 4th, 6th and 8th generation all continue the use of the rotating bezel as an optional navigation interface. The Watch5 Pro and Watch Ultra omit the feature, both the 5th and 7th generation do not have a Classic variant of the smartwatch.

Model		Watch		Watch 3		Watch 4 Classic		Watch 5 Pro	Watch 6 Classic		Watch Ultra	Watch 8 Classic	Watch Ultra 2
Model		42 mm	46 mm	41 mm	45 mm	42 mm	46 mm	45 mm	43 mm	47 mm		46 mm	47 mm
Support status		Unsupported				Supported							
Dates	Announced	11 August 2018		5 August 2020		11 August 2021		10 August 2022	26 July 2023		10 July 2024	9 July 2025	22 July 2026
Dates	Released	24 August 2018		6 August 2020		27 August 2021		26 August 2022	11 August 2023		19 July 2024	25 July 2025	7 August 2026
Model number		SM-R810; SM-R815 LTE	SM-R800; SM-R805 LTE	SM-R840; SM-R845 LTE	SM-R850; SM-R855 LTE	SM-R880; SM-R885 LTE	SM-R890; SM-R895 LTE	SM-R920; SM-R925 LTE	SM-R950; SM-R955 LTE	SM-R960; SM-R965 LTE	SM-L705F; SM-L705N; SM-L705U	SM-L500; SM-L505U	SM-L715
OS	Initial	Tizen 4.0.0.0		One UI Watch 2.0; Tizen 5.5.0.1		One UI Watch 3.0; Wear OS 3.0		One UI Watch 4.5; Wear OS 3.5	One UI Watch 5.0; Wear OS 4.0		One UI Watch 6.0; Wear OS 5.0	One UI Watch 8.0; Wear OS 6.0	One UI Watch 9.0; Wear OS 7.0
OS	Latest	One UI Watch 2.0; Tizen 5.5.0.2				One UI Watch 8.0; Wear OS 6.0							One UI Watch 9.0; Wear OS 7.0
Dimensions mm (in)	Height	45.7 (1.80)	49 (1.9)	42.5 (1.67)	46.2 (1.82)	41.5 (1.63)	45.5 (1.79)	45.4 (1.79)	42.5 (1.67)	46.5 (1.83)	47.4 (1.87)	46.7 (1.84)	47.4 (1.87)
Dimensions mm (in)	Width	41.9 (1.65)	46 (1.8)	41 (1.6)	45 (1.8)	41.5 (1.63)	45.5 (1.79)	45.4 (1.79)	42.5 (1.67)	46.5 (1.83)	47.4 (1.87)	46 (1.8)	47.4 (1.87)
Dimensions mm (in)	Depth	12.7 (0.50)	13 (0.51)	11.3 (0.44)	11.1 (0.44)	11 (0.43)	11.2 (0.44)	10.5 (0.41)	10.9 (0.43)		12.1 (0.48)	10.6 (0.42)	10.7 (0.42)
Weight g (lb)		49 (0.108)	63 (0.139)	48.2 (0.106)	53.8 (0.119)	46.5 (0.103)	52 (0.115)	46.5 (0.103)	52 (0.115)	59 (0.130)	60.5 (0.133)	63.5 (0.140)	61.5 (0.136)
Colors													
Display	Size	1.19 in (30 mm)	1.31 in (33 mm)	1.19 in (30 mm)	1.39 in (35 mm)	1.19 in (30 mm)	1.39 in (35 mm)		1.31 in (33 mm)	1.46 in (37 mm)		1.34 in (34 mm)	1.52 in (39 mm)
Display	Resolution	360 x 360				396 x 396	450 x 450		432 x 432	480 x 480		438 x 438	498 x 498
Display	Type	Super AMOLED											
Display	Glass	Gorilla Glass DX+						Sapphire crystal					
RAM		768 MB; 1.5 GB		1 GB		1.5 GB			2 GB				
Storage		4 GB		4 GB; 8 GB		16 GB					32 GB; 64 GB	64 GB	
Processor		Samsung; Exynos 9110				Samsung; Exynos W920			Samsung; Exynos W930		Samsung; Exynos W1000		Qualcomm; Snapdragon Wear Elite
Connectivity	Wi-Fi	Wi-Fi 4											Wi-Fi 5
Connectivity	Bluetooth	4.2		5.0				5.2	5.3		5.4		6.0
Connectivity	Cellular	LTE optional									LTE	LTE optional	LTE
Connectivity	NFC	Yes											
Connectivity	Positioning	GPS, GLONASS		GPS, GLONASS, GALILEO, BDS									
Battery	Capacity (mAh)	270	472	247	340	247	361	590	300	425	590	445	800
Sensors	Accelerometer	Yes											
Sensors	Gyroscope	Yes											
Sensors	Barometer	Yes											
Sensors	Electro-optical sensor	Yes											
Sensors	Photodetector	Yes											
Sensors	ECG	No		Yes									
Sensors	HRM	No		Yes									
Sensors	Blood oxygen monitor	No				Yes							
Sensors	Blood pressure monitor	No				Yes							
Sensors	Bioelectrical impedance analysis	No				Yes							
Sensors	Temperature	No						Yes					

=== Galaxy Watch FE ===
The Galaxy Watch FE (“Fan Edition”) is a cheaper mid-range smartwatch. The original Galaxy Watch FE is based on the Galaxy Watch4, with the only physical difference being the use of sapphire crystal as glass instead of the Corning Gorilla Glass DX+ used on the original Watch4.

Model		Watch FE
Model		40 mm
Support status		Supported
Dates	Announced	June 13, 2024
Dates	Released	June 24, 2024
Model number		SM-R861; SM-R866
OS	Initial	One UI Watch 5.0; Wear OS 4.0
OS	Latest	One UI Watch 8.0; Wear OS 6.0
Dimensions mm (in)	Height	40.4 (1.59)
Dimensions mm (in)	Width	39.3 (1.55)
Dimensions mm (in)	Depth	9.8 (0.39)
Weight g (lb)		26.6 (0.059)
Colors		
Display	Size	1.19 in (30 mm)
Display	Resolution	396 x 396
Display	Type	Super AMOLED
Display	Glass	Sapphire crystal
RAM		1.5 GB
Storage		16 GB
Processor		Samsung; Exynos W920
Connectivity	Wi-Fi	Wi-Fi 4 (802.11b/a/g/n)
Connectivity	Bluetooth	5.3
Connectivity	Cellular	LTE optional
Connectivity	NFC	Yes
Connectivity	Positioning	GPS, GLONASS, GALILEO, BDS
Battery	Capacity (mAh)	247
Sensors	Accelerometer	Yes
Sensors	Gyroscope	Yes
Sensors	Barometer	Yes
Sensors	Electro-optical sensor	Yes
Sensors	Photodetector	Yes
Sensors	ECG	Yes
Sensors	HRM	Yes
Sensors	Blood oxygen monitor	Yes
Sensors	Blood pressure monitor	Yes
Sensors	Bioelectrical impedance analysis	Yes
Sensors	Temperature	No
