= Curve (payment card) =

Payment card

- Location: United Kingdom; Ireland
- Launched: February 2016 (open beta)
- Website: www.curve.com

Curve is a fintech company who propose the Curve card, a payment card that aggregates multiple payment cards through its accompanying digital wallet mobile app, allowing a user to make payments and withdrawals from a single card. It lets you "switch the bank card you paid with after each transaction is complete." Curve named this feature "Back in time". The Curve company was acquired by Lloyds Banking Group in November 2025.

== History ==
In 2015, Curve, which owns and operates the card and for which the card is named, was founded by Shachar Bialick.

In December 2015, the company secured seed funding of $2 million.

In February 2016, an open beta for iOS users in the "business community" was launched .

In May 2016, Curve notified customers that it would no longer be able to support American Express after 31 May 2016, offering refunds.

In December 2016, Curve announced that the app was made available for Android users.

In June 2017, at Wired Money, Curve was judged the winning startup by a panel of three judges.

In July 2017, it was still in beta testing.

In January 2018, it launched in Ireland. At that time, it remained based in London.

In January 2018, Curve went live in the UK. When it launched in the UK, it had a waiting list of 50,000.

In October 2018, the company said it was aiming to become "the Amazon of banking."

In December 2018, it had a US expansion planned.

In late January 2019, support for American Express was reintroduced on a top-up basis. From January 2019, or a time Curve supported American Express, but this was later discontinued.

On February 1, 2019, when Amex blocked several thousand customers from using Curve's services that week, it was reported that Curve was considering suing Amex, alleging anti-competitive action.

In 2019, Curve launched a metal card. The card was made of 18 grammes of stainless steel, and came in three colours: Blue Steel, Rose Gold, and Curve Red Limited Edition. Only 5,000 Limited-Edition Curve Red cards were printed in a single run.

In April 2020, Curve launched the first numberless card in Europe.

In September 2021, Curve launched a new Buy Now Pay Later feature branded Curve Flex.

In January 2022, Curve partnered with Huawei to enable contactless payments on HMS enabled Huawei smartphones with AppGallery via Huawei Wallet in Europe.

In October 2022, Curve partnered with Fidesmo to enable contactless payments with Fidesmo Pay wearables. This makes it possible to use Fidesmo wearables like rings, bracelets and keyrings with any Mastercard or Visa card.

In March 2025, the fintech company Curve announced it had raised £37 million in funding from Hanaco Ventures. The British-Israeli founder and CEO of Curve, Shachar Bialick, said the funds would be invested into improving customer experience and establishing new partnerships.

In July 2025, Sky News reported that Lloyds Banking Group was in discussion to acquire Curve. In November 2025, it was reported Lloyds Banking Group had signed a £120 million deal to acquire Curve.

== Curve card and app ==
Using the mobile app, users link their debit and credit cards to the Curve card. A default card from which to make payments or withdrawals can then be set, while users can also switch between cards on the app prior to making payments or withdrawals. Transactions on the card are processed through the MasterCard network and can be made using EMV (chip), magnetic stripe or contactless payment.

The Curve app works for iOS and Android.

In July 2017, Curve rolled out a feature on the app allowing users to retroactively change their selected payment card for a transaction as old as 14 days. In 2018, it added a "zero fees" feature for spending internationally.
