= Samsung Galaxy Watch 7 =

2024 smartwatch by Samsung Electronics

Samsung Galaxy Watch 7 Samsung Galaxy Watch Ultra 2024
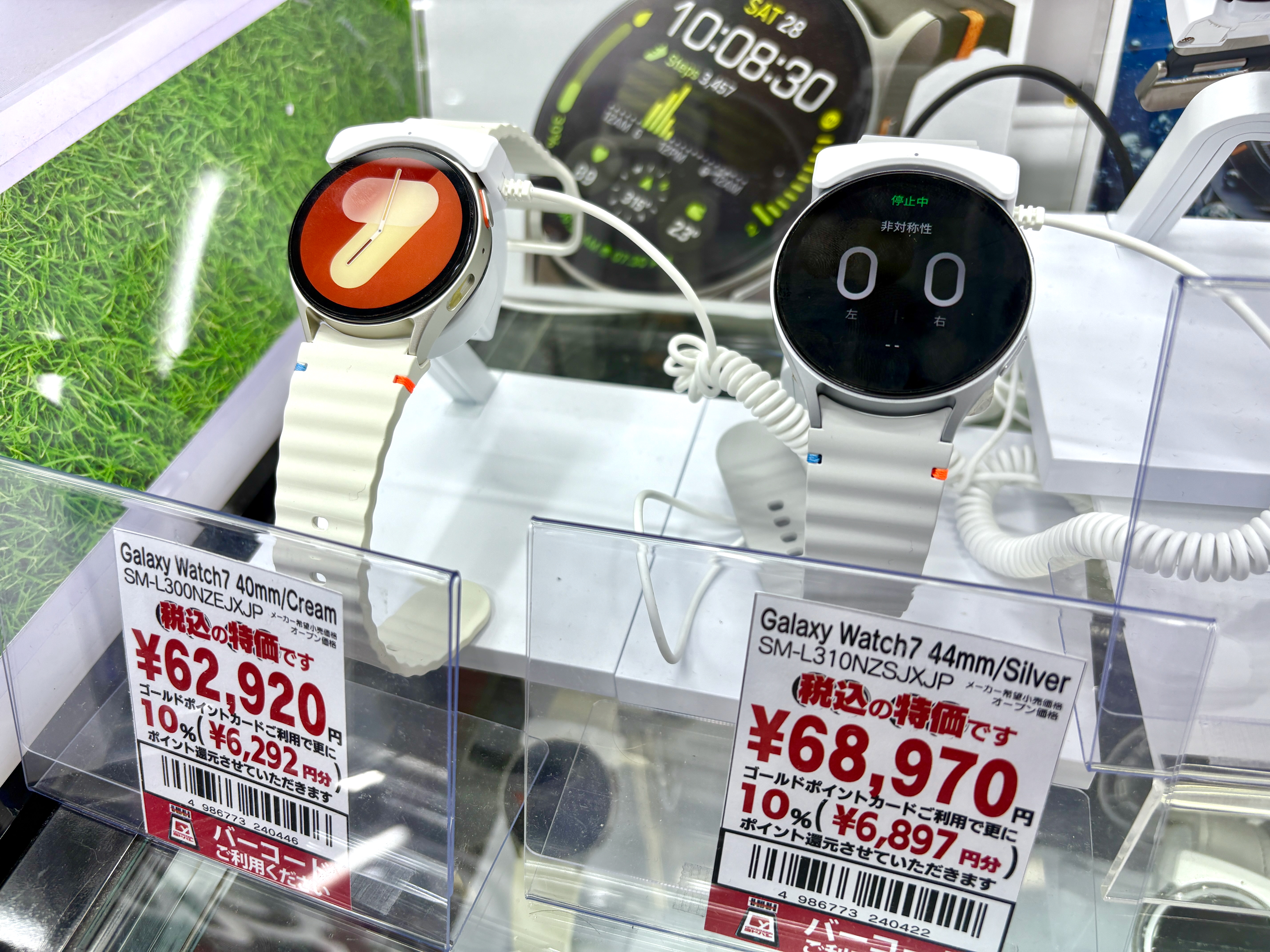
- Two Samsung Galaxy Watch 7 in Cream (left) and Silver
- Brand: Samsung
- Manufacturer: Samsung Electronics
- Type: Smartwatch
- Series: Galaxy Watch
- Family: Samsung Galaxy
- First released: July 10, 2024; 2 years ago
- Availability by region: July 24, 2024; 2 years ago
- Discontinued: July 9, 2025; 15 months ago
- Predecessor: Samsung Galaxy Watch 6
- Successor: Samsung Galaxy Watch 8
- Compatible networks: Cellular models: 3G HSPA / 4G LTE Bands 2/4/5/7/12/13/14/25/26/66/71
- Colors: Green, Cream, Silver
- Dimensions: (40 mm); 40.4 mm (1.59 in) H 40.4 mm (1.59 in) W 9.7 mm (0.38 in) D (44 mm); 44.4 mm (1.75 in) H 44.4 mm (1.75 in) W 9.7 mm (0.38 in) D
- Weight: 28.8 g (1.02 oz) (40 mm); 33.8 g (1.19 oz) (44 mm)
- Operating system: Original: Wear OS 5 with One UI Watch 6 Current: Wear OS 6 with One UI Watch 8
- System-on-chip: Samsung Exynos W1000 (3 nm)
- CPU: 1x 1.6GHz Cortex-A78; 4x 1.5GHz Cortex-A55
- GPU: Mali-G68 MP2
- Memory: 2 GB RAM LPDDR5
- Storage: 32 GB eMMC 5.1
- SIM: Cellular: eSIM
- Battery: Internal Li-Ion; 300 mAh (40 mm); 425 mAh (44 mm)
- Charging: Qi wireless charging up to 15 W, Although it is not comparable with wireless power sharing, due to the redesigned sensor
- Display: RGB stripe AMOLED; 1.31 in (33 mm) 432 x 432p (~330 ppi); 1.47 in (37 mm) 480 x 480p (~327 ppi)
- External display: Always on
- Connectivity: Wi-Fi 5 802.11 a/b/g/n, dual-band Bluetooth 5.3, A2DP, LE
- Data inputs: Accelerometer; Gyroscope; Heart rate monitor Barometer
- Water resistance: IP68 dust tight and water-resistant (immersible up to 50m/5ATM)
- Model: SM-L300 (40 mm); SM-L310 (44 mm); SM-L305 (40 mm cellular); SM-L315 (44 mm cellular); Last letter on cellular models varies by region and carrier
- Website: Galaxy Watch 7

The Samsung Galaxy Watch 7 (stylized as Samsung Galaxy Watch7) and Samsung Galaxy Watch Ultra 2024 are a series of Wear OS-based smartwatches developed and marketed by Samsung Electronics. They were announced on July 10, 2024, at Samsung's biannual Galaxy Unpacked event, in Paris, France, alongside the Galaxy Z Fold 6, the Galaxy Z Flip 6, the Galaxy Buds 3 series and the Galaxy Ring. They were launched on July 24, 2024.

The Galaxy Watch 7 was succeeded by the Galaxy Watch 8 series on July 9, 2025. Its Ultra model was succeeded by the Galaxy Watch Ultra 2 on August 7, 2026.

== Specifications ==
Model	Galaxy Watch 7		Galaxy Watch Ultra (2024)
Size	40 mm	44 mm	47 mm
Model numbers	SM-L300, SM-L305U & SM-L305F (LTE)	SM-L310, SM-L315U & SM-L315F (LTE)	SM-L900 (LTE)
Colors	Green, Cream	Green, Silver	Titanium Gray, Titanium White, Titanium Orange
Display	1.31" (33.3 mm)	1.47" (37.3 mm)	
Resolution	432 × 432 pixels	480 × 480 pixels	
Glass	Sapphire crystal		
Chassis	Aluminum		Titanium
Processor	Exynos W1000 (5-core: one Cortex-A78 @1.6 GHz + four Cortex-A55 up to 1.5 GHz)		
Operating system	Wear OS 5.0 (upgradable to 6.0)		
User interface	One UI Watch 6.0 (upgradable to 8.0)		
Size (excluding the health sensor)	40.4 × 40.4 × 9.7 mm	44.4 × 44.4 × 9.7 mm	47.1 × 47.1 × 12.1 mm
Weight (without strap)	28.8 g	33.8 g	60.5 g
Strap size	20 mm		26 mm
Water resistance	IP68 + 5 ATM		IP68 + 10 ATM (and MIL-STD-810H)
Memory	2 GB RAM + 32 GB storage		
Connectivity	LTE (optional); Bluetooth 5.3 (A2DP, LE); Wi-Fi 4 (802.11a/b/g/n 2.4 + 5 GHz); NFC; A-GPS, GLONASS, BeiDou, Galileo		
Sensors	Heart rate monitor; Blood oxygen monitor (SpO₂); Electrocardiography (ECG); Blood pressure monitor; Bioelectrical Impedance Analysis (BIA); Temperature sensor; Accelerometer; Barometer; Gyro sensor; Geomagnetic sensor; Light sensor		
Features	Natural language command and dictation; Emergency SOS system; Fall detection; Advanced GPS (dual-frequency) in Ultra		
Battery	300 mAh	425 mAh	590 mAh

== See also ==
- Google Pixel Watch 3
- Apple Watch
