= Samsung Galaxy Watch 6 =

2023 smartwatches by Samsung Electronics

Samsung Galaxy Watch 6 Samsung Galaxy Watch 6 Classic
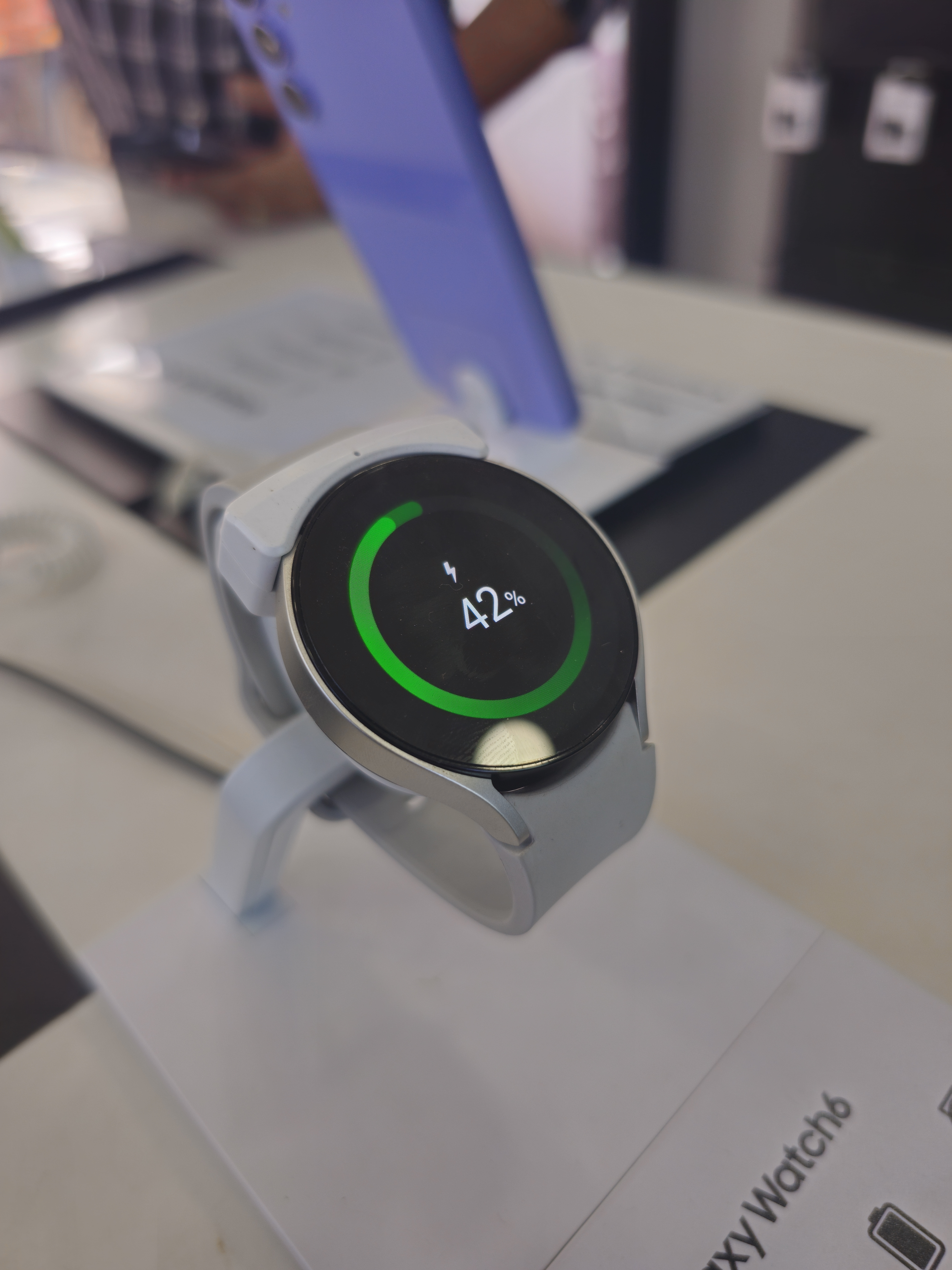
- Samsung Galaxy Watch 6
- Brand: Samsung
- Manufacturer: Samsung Electronics
- Type: Smartwatch
- Series: Galaxy Watch
- Family: Samsung Galaxy
- First released: August 11, 2023; 3 years ago
- Availability by region: August 11, 2023; 3 years ago
- Discontinued: July 10, 2024; 2 years ago
- Units shipped: 10.6 million
- Predecessor: Samsung Galaxy Watch 5
- Successor: Samsung Galaxy Watch 7
- Compatible networks: 3G / 4G
- Colors: Graphite, Silver, Pink Gold, Sapphire
- Dimensions: (40 mm) 40.4 mm (1.59 in) H 38.4 mm (1.51 in) W 9 mm (0.35 in) D; (44 mm) 44.4 mm (1.75 in) H 42.8 mm (1.69 in) W 9 mm (0.35 in) D
- Weight: 28.7 g (1.01 oz) (40 mm); 33.3 g (1.17 oz) (44 mm)
- Operating system: Original: Wear OS 4 with One UI Watch 5 Current: Wear OS 6 with One UI Watch 8
- System-on-chip: Exynos W930 (5 nm)
- CPU: Dual-core 1.4GHz Cortex-A55
- GPU: Mali-G68 MP2
- Modem: 4G LTE
- Memory: 2 GB RAM
- Storage: 16 GB
- Removable storage: No
- SIM: eSIM
- Battery: Non-removable Li-Ion; 300 mAh (40 mm); 425 mAh (44 mm)
- Charging: Wireless up to 10W (5V 2A)
- Rear camera: No
- Front camera: No
- Display: 1.31 in (33 mm) RGB stripe AMOLED 432 x 432p (~330 ppi); 1.47 in (37 mm) RGB stripe AMOLED 480 x 480p (~327 ppi)
- External display: Always on
- Sound: Yes, speaker on the side of the watch.
- Connectivity: Wi-Fi 802.11 a/b/g/n, dual-band Bluetooth 5.3, A2DP, LE
- Data inputs: Accelerometer; Gyroscope; Heart rate monitor Barometer
- Water resistance: Yes, IP68
- Model: SM-R930 / SM-R935
- Website: Galaxy Watch 6

The Samsung Galaxy Watch 6 (stylized as Samsung Galaxy Watch6) is a series of Wear OS-based smartwatches manufactured, developed and designed by Samsung Electronics. It was announced on July 26, 2023, alongside the Galaxy Z Fold 5, the Galaxy Z Flip 5 and the Galaxy Tab S9 series, at the Samsung's biannual Galaxy Unpacked event in Seoul, South Korea, making it the first such release held in the company's home country. The watches were released on August 11, 2023.

The Galaxy Watch 6 was succeeded by the Galaxy Watch 7 on July 10, 2024.

== Specifications ==
Model	Galaxy Watch 6		Galaxy Watch 6 Classic		Ref.
Size	40 mm	44 mm	43 mm	47 mm	
Part no.	SM-R930 (Wi-Fi) SM-R935 (LTE)	SM-R940 (Wi-Fi) SM-R945 (LTE)	SM-R950 (Wi-Fi) SM-R955 (LTE)	SM-R960 (Wi-Fi) SM-R965 (LTE)	
Colors	Graphite, Gold	Graphite, Silver	Black, silver		
Display	1.31" (33.3 mm)	1.47" (37.3 mm)	1.31" (33.3 mm)	1.47" (37.3 mm)	
Resolution	432 x 432 pixels	480 x 480 pixels	432 x 432 pixels	480 x 480 pixels	
Glass	Sapphire crystal				
Chassis	Aluminum		Stainless steel		
Processor	Exynos W930 dual-core 1.4 GHz Cortex-A55				
Operating system	Wear OS 4.0 (upgradable to 6.0)				
User interface	One UI Watch 5.0 (upgradable to 8.0)				
Size (excluding the health sensor)	38.8 x 40.4 x 9 mm (1.53 x 1.59 x 0.35 in)	42.8 x 44.4 x 9 mm (1.69 x 1.75 x 0.35 in)	42.5 x 42.5 x 10.9 mm (1.67 x 1.67 x 0.43 in)	46.5 x 46.5 x 10.9 mm (1.83 x 1.83 x 0.43 in)	
Weight (without strap)	28.7 g (1.02 oz)	33.3 g (1.16 oz)	52 g (1.83 oz)	59 g (2.08 oz)	
Strap size	20 mm				
Water resistance	5ATM + IP68 / MIL-STD-810H				
Memory	2 GB RAM + 16 GB flash memory				
Connectivity	4G/LTE with eSIM (LTE models only); Bluetooth 5.3; Wi-Fi a/b/g/n 2.4+5 GHz; NFC; A-GPS, GLONASS, Beidou, Galileo				
Sensors	Heart rate monitor; Blood oxygen monitor; Electrocardiography (ECG); Blood pressure monitor; Bioelectrical impedance analysis; Temperature sensor; Accelerometer; Barometer; Gyro sensor; Geomagnetic sensor; Light sensor				
Features	Natural language command and dictation; Emergency SOS system				
Battery	300 mAh	425 mAh	300 mAh	425 mAh	
