= Samsung Galaxy Z Fold 8 =

2026 foldable smartphones by Samsung Electronics

Samsung Galaxy Z Fold 8 series

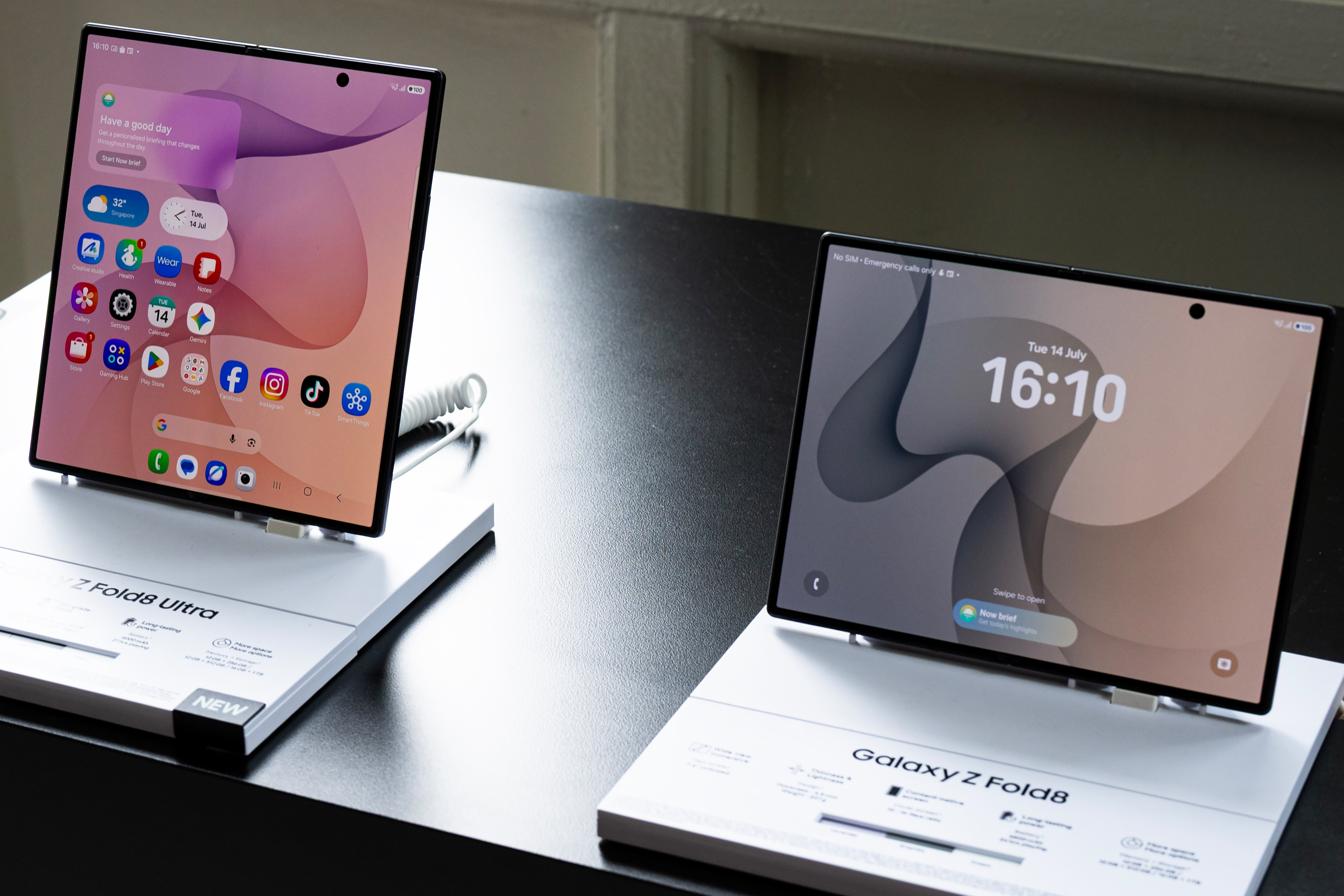
- The Samsung Galaxy Z Fold8 Ultra (left) and Fold8 (right) in unfolded form
- Also known as: Samsung Galaxy Fold 8, Samsung Galaxy Fold 8 Ultra (in certain European countries)
- Brand: Samsung
- Manufacturer: Samsung Electronics
- Type: Foldable smartphone
- Series: Galaxy Z
- Family: Samsung Galaxy
- First released: Z Fold 8 and Z Fold 8 Ultra: August 7, 2026; 3 months ago
- Availability by region: Z Fold 8 and Z Fold 8 Ultra: August 7, 2026; 3 months ago
- Predecessor: Samsung Galaxy Z Fold 7
- Related: Samsung Galaxy S26; Samsung Galaxy Z Flip 8
- Compatible networks: 2G / 3G / 4G / 5G
- Form factor: Foldable (book-style)
- Colors: Cream; Graphite; Lavender (Z Fold 8); Pistachio (Z Fold 8; online exclusive); Green Shadow (Z Fold 8 Ultra; online exclusive); Violet Shadow (Z Fold 8 Ultra)
- Dimensions: Z Fold 8: Folded: 123.9 mm (4.88 in) H 81.9 mm (3.22 in) W 9.7 mm (0.38 in) D Unfolded: 123.9 mm (4.88 in) H 161.4 mm (6.35 in) W 4.5 mm (0.18 in) D Z Fold 8 Ultra: Folded: 158.4 mm (6.24 in) H 72.8 mm (2.87 in) W 8.9 mm (0.35 in) D Unfolded: 158.4 mm (6.24 in) H 143.2 mm (5.64 in) W 4.1 mm (0.16 in) D
- Weight: Z Fold 8: 201 g (7.1 oz); Z Fold 8 Ultra: 215 g (7.6 oz)
- Operating system: Android 17, up to 7 major Android upgrades, One UI 9
- System-on-chip: Qualcomm Snapdragon 8 Elite Gen 5 (3 nm)
- GPU: Adreno 840
- Memory: 12GB, 16GB
- Storage: 256GB, 512GB, 1TB
- SIM: Dual Nano-SIM + multiple eSIM (region dependent)
- Battery: Z Fold 8: 4,800 mAh dual battery Z Fold 8 Ultra: 5,000 mAh dual battery
- Charging: 45W wired 20W wireless 4.5W reverse wireless
- Display: Z Fold 8: Foldable Dynamic LTPO AMOLED 2X, 120Hz, HDR10+, 3,000 nits (peak), 7.6 inches, 2448 x 1848 pixels, 4:3 aspect ratio, ~403 ppi Z Fold 8 Ultra: Foldable Dynamic LTPO AMOLED 2X, 120Hz, HDR10+, 3,000 nits (peak), 8.0 inches, 204.4 cm2 (~90.1% screen-to-body ratio), 2504 x 2256 pixels, ~422 ppi
- External display: Z Fold 8: Dynamic LTPO AMOLED 2X, 120Hz, Corning Gorilla Glass Ceramic 3, 5.5 inches, 1972 x 1248 pixels, 10:16 aspect ratio, 428 ppi Z Fold 8 Ultra: Dynamic LTPO AMOLED 2X, 120Hz, Corning Gorilla Glass Ceramic 3, 6.5 inches, 2520 x 1080 pixels, 21:9 aspect ratio, 422 ppi
- Sound: Stereo speakers
- Connectivity: Wi-Fi 802.11 a/b/g/n/ac/6e/7, tri-band, Wi-Fi Direct; Bluetooth 6.0, A2DP, LE, aptX HD; GPS, GALILEO, GLONASS, BDS, QZSS; USB Type-C 3.2 Gen 1, OTG
- Data inputs: Fingerprint (side-mounted); Accelerometer; Gyro; Proximity; Compass; Barometer
- Water resistance: IP48 (up to 1.5m for 30 min)
- Model: Z Fold 8: SM-F971x; Z Fold 8 Ultra: SM-F976x (last letter varies by carrier and international models)
- Website: Samsung Galaxy Z Fold8 (US)

The Samsung Galaxy Z Fold 8 (stylized as Samsung Galaxy Z Fold8 and Z Fold8 Ultra) is a series of high-end Android-based foldable smartphones manufactured, developed, designed and marketed by Samsung Electronics as the part of its Galaxy Z series. Unveiled on July 22, 2026 at Samsung's Galaxy Unpacked event held in London, alongside the Galaxy Z Flip 8, Galaxy Watch 9 series, and Galaxy Glasses, it launched with a new "Wide" variant to the lineup, and were officially released on August 7, 2026 as a successor to the Samsung Galaxy Z Fold 7.

Although it is the eighth main device in the Samsung Galaxy Z Fold series, Samsung used the "Ultra" branding like with the Galaxy S series after its introduction on the Galaxy S20 Ultra, and alongside the Z Flip 8, they were the first phones with Android 17 pre-installed. This series marks the first time that it was released in two variations and marketed together (the Galaxy Z Fold 8 and Galaxy Z Fold 8 Ultra) with the former having a wide screen similar to a passport, (Note: The Galaxy Z Fold 8 is the wider variant, while the Galaxy Z Fold 8 Ultra is the standard variant.) and the latter being the official successor to the Galaxy Z Fold 7.

== History ==
=== Development ===
Development of the Galaxy Z Fold 7's successor began shortly after its announcement. First signs of the successor surfaced in the GSMA database in December 2025 under the codename "H8" (with model number SM-F971U), initially thought to be assigned for a Flip-style foldable, but later suggested expansion for a new Fold-style product line.

Subsequent testing of internal One UI 9 builds in February 2026, later confirmed a Flip model and two different Fold-style models (SM-F776U for Z Fold 8, and SM-F971U, which was initially known as the "Wide Fold"). (Note: Attributed to multiple references:) In addition, internal builds of the Wide Fold's animation files in One UI 9 ahead of its unveiling.

Early reports about the Galaxy Z Fold 8 began to surface as early as March 2026, wherein it be produced in two different versions: a standard version (which was considered to be the successor to the Galaxy Z Fold 7) and a wide screen version (similar to a passport). Dimensions for the two models were also known, suggesting that it may had a larger battery or S Pen support. In April 2026, reports confirm the Galaxy Z Fold 8 launch dates and its key features.

Design references and animation files of the Galaxy Z Fold 8 series were reported in an early build of One UI 9 in May 2026. Early reports for the processor and the battery were also known, suggesting the use of Qualcomm Snapdragon 8 Elite Gen 5, and two different battery capacities (5,000 mAh for the normal Z Fold 8, and 4,800 mAh for the "Wide Fold"). Multiple reports of the "Wide Fold" devices were also reported, ranging from supposed to be screen protectors, dummy units (with a rear camera module similar to the Galaxy S25 Edge), to employees seen using the upcoming Wide foldable.

The name of the "Wide Fold" device was originally presumed to be the Z Fold 8 Wide due to it having a version with a wide screen, but this was later refuted in May 2026, when it was revealed that the Wide variant would be known as the Z Fold 8, while the standard variant would be known as the Z Fold 8 Ultra (which would become the proper successor to the Galaxy Z Fold 7). (Note: Attributed to multiple references:) Multiple reports of the wide Galaxy Z Fold 8 would later be known in June 2026, ranging from its wallpapers (matching from the supposed device colors), to screen protectors.

Supposed thickness of the inner display were reported, which said it will jump to 60μm for the wider Z Fold 8 while the normal Z Fold 8 will be at 45μm, which is 30% thicker than the Z Fold 7. The wider Fold 8 would come with a “significantly enhanced” display resolution. Color options and storage options for the phones were revealed ahead of launch. Early hands-on impressions of the Galaxy Z Fold 8 series were known, with one mentioning the wider Fold having a lighter device weight. Renders of the supposed devices were also reported alongside the official cases in June 2026. The Z Fold 8's design was officially teased in a campaign on June 30, 2026, which showed a Galaxy Z Fold 8 series wallpaper and taglines teasing the new form-factor.

In July 2026, its Galaxy Unpacked launch dates were also accidentally revealed in a pre-order form. Final renders for the phones with the official screen protectors were also reported. Cases from a third-party manufacturer for the then-upcoming phones were also found, showing the listings for the Galaxy Z Fold 8 series cases with integrated magnets for Qi2 wireless charging. Soon after, final renders for the phones with the official colors were also known. In addition, multiple reports of the devices began to surface leading to its launch, ranging from actual units at a retail store in South Korea, marketing renders, to promotional materials.

A video was posted showing a working, normal Galaxy Z Fold 8 with a flat display, along with additional details, including the almost invisible crease in the middle of the display, while retaining the same design as the Galaxy Z Fold 7. A day before its launch, final renders for the wider Galaxy Z Fold 8 were reported, showing off the 4:3 aspect ratio display. Hours before its official unveiling, a picture was posted showing the actual Galaxy Z Fold 8 Ultra at a factory environment, showing off the "crease-less" display.

=== Other appearances ===
The Z Fold 8's design was teased twice in a Spider-Man: Brand New Day poster and video on July 9, 2026 and July 15, 2026, in partnership with Sony and Marvel Studios, showing a wider Galaxy Z Fold 8 with two rear cameras, and Spider-Man holding a wider Galaxy Z Fold 8 and carried the tagline "A brand new shape for a Brand New Day".

The Z Fold 8's design was leaked in an Instagram post shared by BTS on July 17, 2026 while on the Arirang World Tour, five days before the official launch, showing a BTS member J-Hope holding an actual wider Galaxy Z Fold 8. A day before the official launch, the Z Fold 8's design was teased in an X post shared by Samsung Mobile, showing a BTS member J-Hope holding a wider Galaxy Z Fold 8.

A day before the official launch, the Z Fold 8's design was leaked in an advertisement shared by T-Mobile for Business, which showed a wider Galaxy Z Fold 8 and calling it “pocket-size powerhouse”. On July 17, 2026, a customized Galaxy Z Fold 8 Ultra was listed for sale on Caviar's website.

=== Launch ===
On July 7, 2026, it was reported that Samsung was preparing to open up reservations for the next Galaxy Unpacked event. A few hours later, Samsung officially sent out invites for the next Galaxy Unpacked event set for July 22, 2026, in London, which showed a silhouette of the regular-sized Galaxy Z Fold 8, tearing off into a passport-like Galaxy Z Fold 8.

The Galaxy Z Fold 8 and Z Fold 8 Ultra were announced during that event with improvements to the battery, a new processor, upgraded display and introducing a new model to the lineup. Samsung called the Z Fold 8 Ultra its "most advanced foldable design" and the slimmest foldable that it has developed. Shortly before its official unveiling, reports as early as July 2026 suggested that Samsung would drop the free storage upgrade because of the RAM crisis. Samsung did kept the pre-order bonus but it only applied for the base 256GB models.

== Line-up ==
The Galaxy Z Fold 8 series includes two models: the Galaxy Z Fold 8 and Galaxy Z Fold 8 Ultra. At 201 g, the Galaxy Z Fold 8 is lighter than other book-style foldables released before it. For comparison, the Galaxy Z Fold 8 Ultra and the Galaxy Z Fold 7 both weigh 215 g, while competitors weigh between 217 and 226 g. The clamshell-format Galaxy Z Flip 8 is lighter still, at 180 g. The Galaxy Z Fold 8 has a 7.6-inch panel, compared with 7.95 to 8.12 inches on competing book-style foldables.

Galaxy Z Fold 8 series thickness
Model	Thickness		Weight
Model	Folded	Unfolded	Weight
Z Fold 8	9.7 mm (0.38 in)	4.5 mm (0.18 in)	201 g
Z Fold 8 Ultra	8.9 mm (0.35 in)	4.1 mm (0.16 in)	215 g
Ref.			

=== Performance ===
The Galaxy Z Fold 8 series is powered by the Qualcomm Snapdragon 8 Elite Gen 5 for Galaxy, which powers the Z Fold 8 and Z Fold 8 Ultra worldwide.

== Design ==
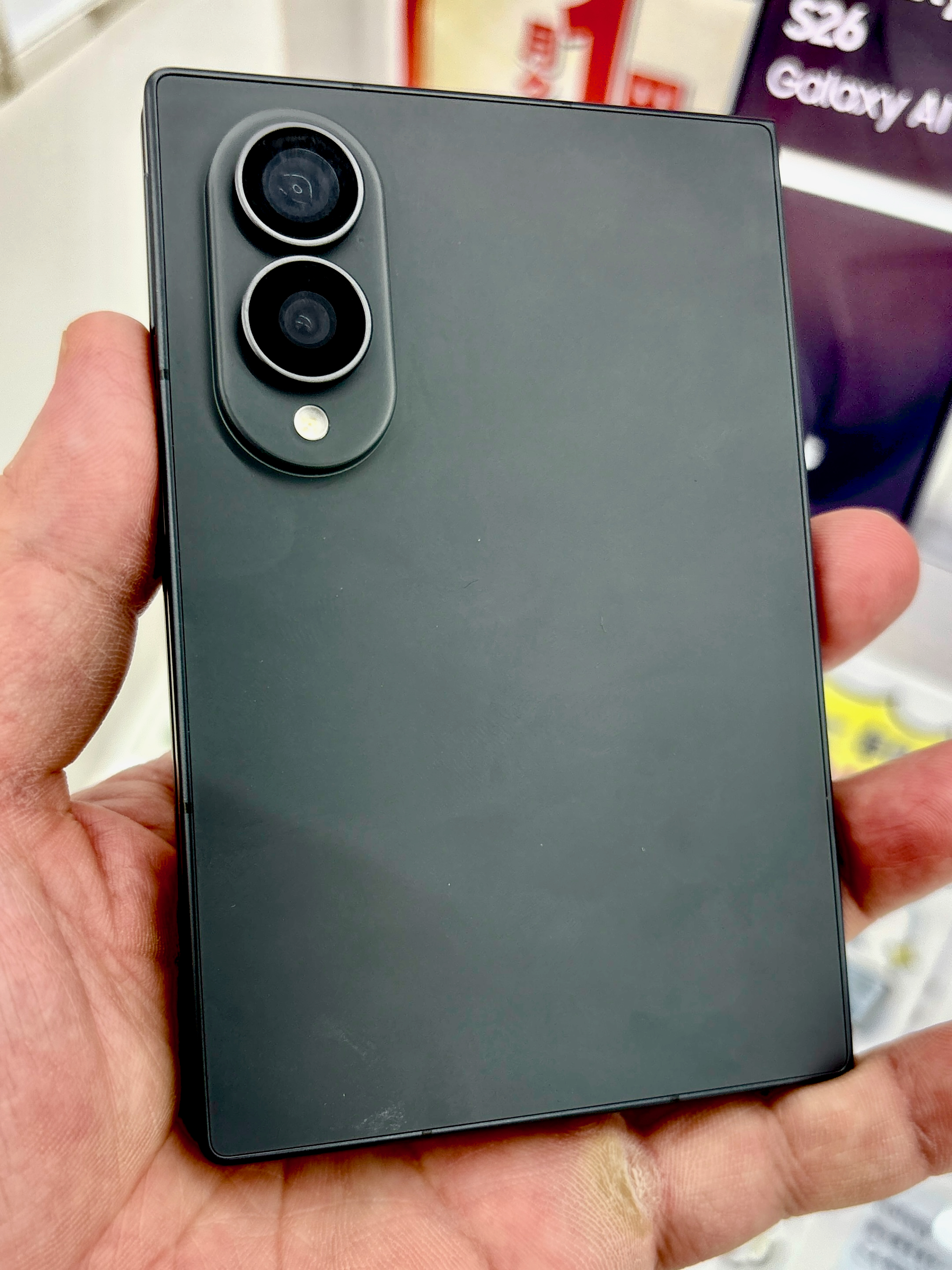
Back of the Galaxy Z Fold 8 in Pistachio

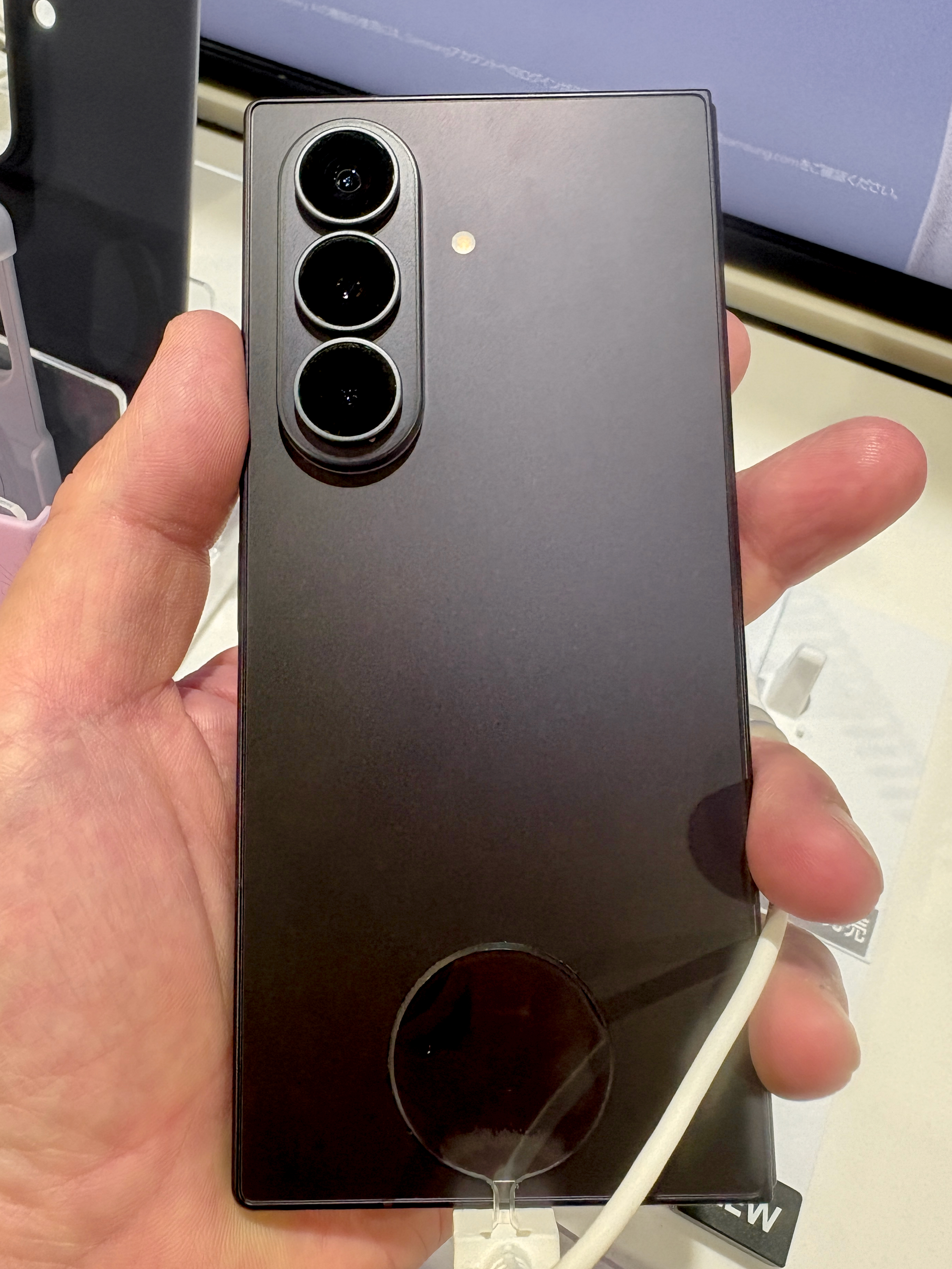
Back of the Galaxy Z Fold 8 Ultra in Graphite

At launch, the Galaxy Z Fold 8 series is available in four standard color options: Cream, Graphite, Lavender, and Violet Shadow. A fifth and sixth variant, Pistachio and Green Shadow is available exclusively through Samsung's online store. The devices continue to have an aluminum frame, similar to its predecessor. The Galaxy Z Fold 8 series features Flex Titanium, a display technology that adds a titanium plate to make it durable, which also reduces crease visibility and better durability, using a titanium-alloy film to make it less flexible.

Model	Z Fold 8	Z Fold 8 Ultra
Base colors	Cream; Graphite	
Base colors	Lavender	Violet Shadow
Online exclusive colors	Pistachio	Green Shadow

== Specifications ==
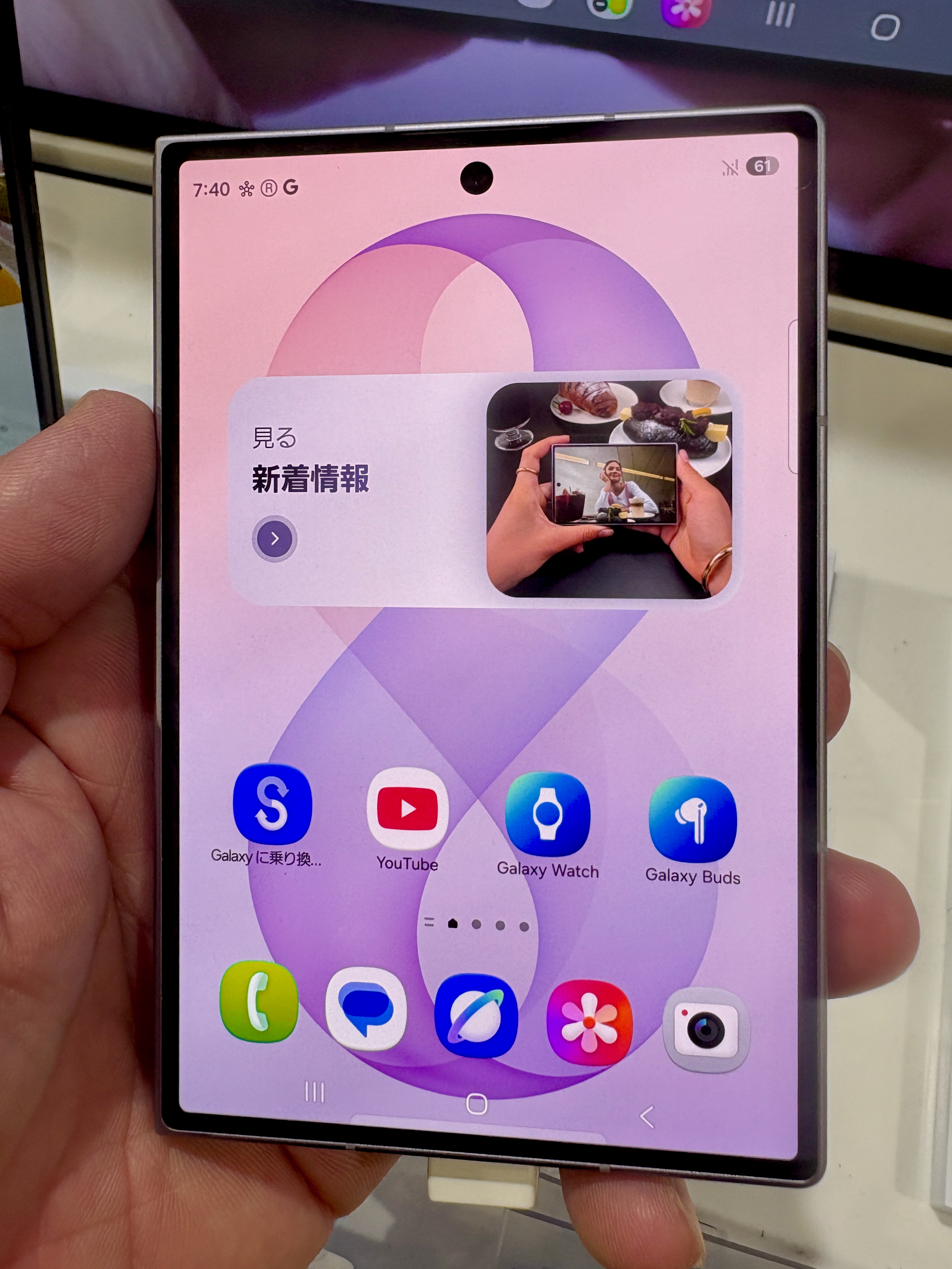
Front of the Galaxy Z Fold 8 in folded form

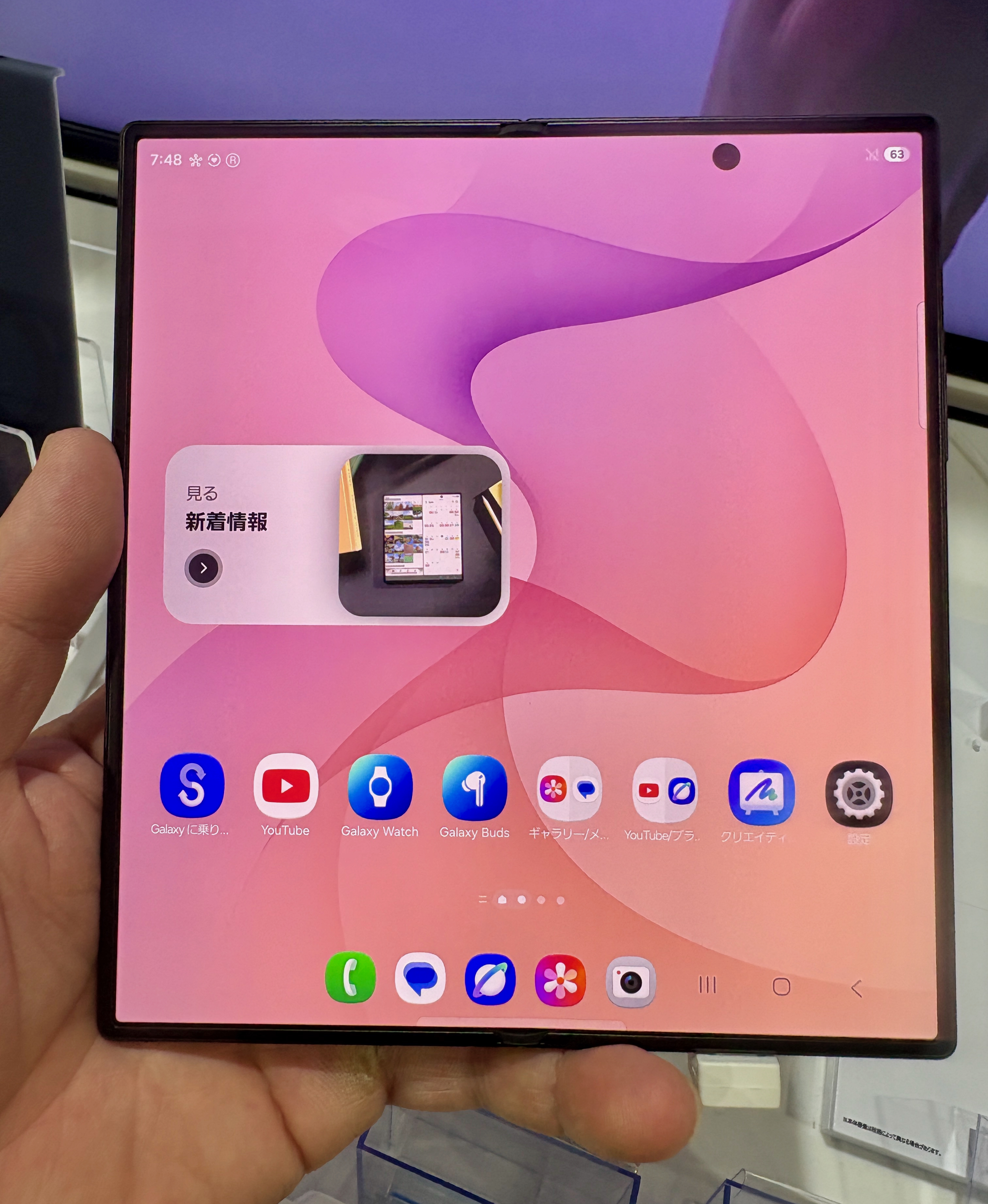
Front of the Galaxy Z Fold 8 Ultra in unfolded form

=== Display ===
The Galaxy Z Fold 8 Ultra features 6.5 in (170 mm) display a resolution of 2520 × 1080 pixels adopting a 21:9 aspect ratio, offering a viewing experience. The main foldable display measures 8.0 in (200 mm) and has a resolution of 2504 x 2256 pixels, and can reach up to 3,000 nits of brightness under specific conditions, such as when using Vision Booster in direct sunlight.

Feature		Z Fold 8	Z Fold 8 Ultra
Display size	Main	7.6 inches (190.8 mm)	8.0 inches (203.1 mm)
Display size	Cover	5.5 inches (140 mm)	6.5 inches (164.8 mm)
Display Type	Main	Dynamic AMOLED 2X Infinity Flex & O Display	
Display Type	Cover	Dynamic AMOLED 2X Infinity-O Display	
Resolution	Main	2448 x 1848	2504 x 2256
Resolution	Cover	1972 x 1248	2520 x 1080
Aspect Ratio	Main	4:3	10:9
Aspect Ratio	Cover	10:16	21:9
Protection	Main	Ultra Thin Glass, Anti-Reflection coating	
Protection	Cover	Gorilla Glass Ceramic 3	
Others	Refresh rate	1–120 Hz (adaptive)	
Others	Peak brightness	3,000 nits	
Others	HDR	HDR10+	
Ref.			

=== Camera ===
The wider Z Fold 8 has a pair of 50 MP rear cameras (primary and ultrawide) and a pair of 10 MP front cameras (cover and inner screens). The Z Fold 8 Ultra, meanwhile, carries over the primary, telephoto, and front cameras over its predecessor, but upgrades the ultrawide camera to 50 MP.

Camera	Z Fold 8	Z Fold 8 Ultra
Wide	50 MP (f/1.8)	200 MP (f/1.7)
Ultrawide	50 MP (f/1.9)	
Telephoto	—N/a	10 MP (3×) (f/2.4)
Front camera (Cover and inner screens)	10 MP (f/2.2)	
Additional features	2× optical quality zoom Sensor-size & pixel-binning Super Steady mode (with Horizon Lock)	Space Zoom (up to 30×); 2× optical quality zoom Sensor-size & pixel-binning Super Steady mode (with Horizon Lock)
All models support 8K video recording at up to 30 fps

=== Batteries ===
The Galaxy Z Fold 8 is powered by a dual 4,800 mAh battery, while the Galaxy Z Fold 8 Ultra is powered by a dual 5,000 mAh battery. The series also marked the first time that it used silicon-carbon batteries.

Specification	Z Fold 8	Z Fold 8 Ultra
Battery capacity	4,800 mAh	5,000 mAh
Wired charging	45 W (USB Power Delivery 3.0, Quick Charge 2.0)	
Wireless charging	20 W	
Reverse wireless charging	4.5 W	
Ref.		

=== Memory and storage ===
The Galaxy Z Fold 8 series launched with 12 GB of RAM. The two models start at 256 GB, The 1 TB version of the Z Fold 8 and Z Fold 8 Ultra has 16 GB of RAM, and is available worldwide.

Model	Memory	Storage options	Storage type
Z Fold 8	12 GB / 16 GB (For 1 TB version)	256 GB / 512 GB / 1 TB	UFS 4.0
Z Fold 8 Ultra	12 GB / 16 GB (For 1 TB version)	256 GB / 512 GB / 1 TB	UFS 4.0
Ref.			

== Software ==
The Galaxy Z Fold 8 and Z Fold 8 Ultra were released with Android 17 and One UI 9. Alongside the Galaxy Z Flip 8, it is promised to get up to seven years of operating system and security updates, which has been the software policy ever since the release of Galaxy Z Fold 6 and Galaxy Z Flip 6.

	Pre-installed OS	OS upgrade history							End of support
	Pre-installed OS	1st	2nd	3rd	4th	5th	6th	7th	End of support
Z Fold 8	Android 17 (One UI 9.0)								Within 2033
Z Fold 8 Ultra	Android 17 (One UI 9.0)								Within 2033

== Reception ==
=== Critical reception ===
The Z Fold 8 series received a major upgrade from the Galaxy Z Fold 7, with the Galaxy Z Fold 8 having a 4:3 aspect ratio, and one criticism is that it only had an IP48 rating. Initial hands-on of the devices stated that the Galaxy Z Fold 8 has the same amount of usable screen space as the Galaxy Z Fold 8 Ultra, but the new shape didn't work as well for videos. One reviewer said that it is the first time that the form factor has made it smitten, and the color choices were the most impressive aspects, which suggests opting for the online exclusive Pistachio color. Samsung talked about the new hinge assembly to make the foldable easier to open up, and talks about its decisions around the Z Fold 8’s new shape, and color choices. A reviewer commented about the new foldable lineup, with Violet Shadow on the Z Fold 8 Ultra being "chic" and "sophisticated", while the Lavender color on the Z Fold 8 was described as being "fresh" and "soft".

Several reviewers described the devices as the lightest book-style foldable available at the time and noted that it was also lighter than conventional flagship phones, such as Samsung's own Galaxy S26 Ultra. Another reviewer made a similar observation, identifying the weight and the 4.5 mm unfolded thickness as the characteristics distinguishing the model from earlier Fold devices. Criticism has been aimed at the lack of a Privacy Display (a feature used in the S26 Ultra), the lack of S Pen support (despite other foldables not made by Samsung having support for active stylus input on both displays), the lack of Flex Mode (on the wider Galaxy Z Fold 8), and performance differences between the wider Z Fold 8 and Z Fold 8 Ultra (even though both devices use the same chipset).

Following Apple, Samsung's new software made changes to the lock screen where after 13th failed unlock attempts, it would lockout the phone, requiring a factory reset to regain access (this only applies to devices that launched with One UI 9). iFixit's teardown of the Z Fold 8 had serious repair flaws, and it has given a repairability score of 4 out of 10 due to a fragile inner screen, a delicate hinge and impractical dust protection (that's when the hinge started making crunching and grinding noises after working on the Fold 8's hinge).

=== Sales ===
In late-July 2026, it was reported that the wider Galaxy Z Fold 8 was selling faster, and that the Pistachio color was selling faster than expected. Earlier that month, It was reported that Samsung would produce 4.8 million units prior to its unveiling. Tipster Ice Universe suggests that the wider Galaxy Z Fold 8 would become "the best-selling folding item in Samsung's history". Furthermore, Google started selling the wider Galaxy Z Fold 8 during its pre-order phase, and it offers a discount of $150 on selected users during pre-order.

The Z Fold 8 series broke pre-order records in the first two weeks after its launch due to high demand, which experienced a delay in delivery, with multiple colors delayed for months. Korean media reported that the Galaxy Z Fold 8 was seeing 3x the pre-order demand, a notable increase from the Z Fold 7. Yonhap News reported that 1.44 million of the Galaxy Z8 foldables were preordered in South Korea, which broke the preorder record that was set in 2019 with the Galaxy Note 10 series. ETNews reported that Samsung would order an additional one million units due to high demand, and that the Z Fold 8 had received 30% higher pre-orders than the Z Fold 7.

The iPhone Duo's announcement slightly increased Galaxy Z Fold 8 sales in South Korea, with industry sources claiming a rise of approximately 10% compared to the week before the Duo's announcement and attributing it mainly to pent-up demand and long pre-order waiting times.

== Issues ==
Even before the general release, reviewers had problems where benchmark apps wouldn't install. Samsung had temporarily blocked benchmark apps because the Z Fold 8 series was running pre-release engineering firmware, and that Samsung would issue a software update to allow benchmarking apps to be installed and used normally.

== See also ==
- Samsung Galaxy Z series
- Samsung Galaxy Z Flip 8

== Notes ==
Preceded by Samsung Galaxy Z Fold 7	Samsung Galaxy Z Fold 8; 2026	Succeeded by Current
