= Samsung Galaxy Watch 9 =

2026 smartwatches by Samsung Electronics

Samsung Galaxy Watch 9 series
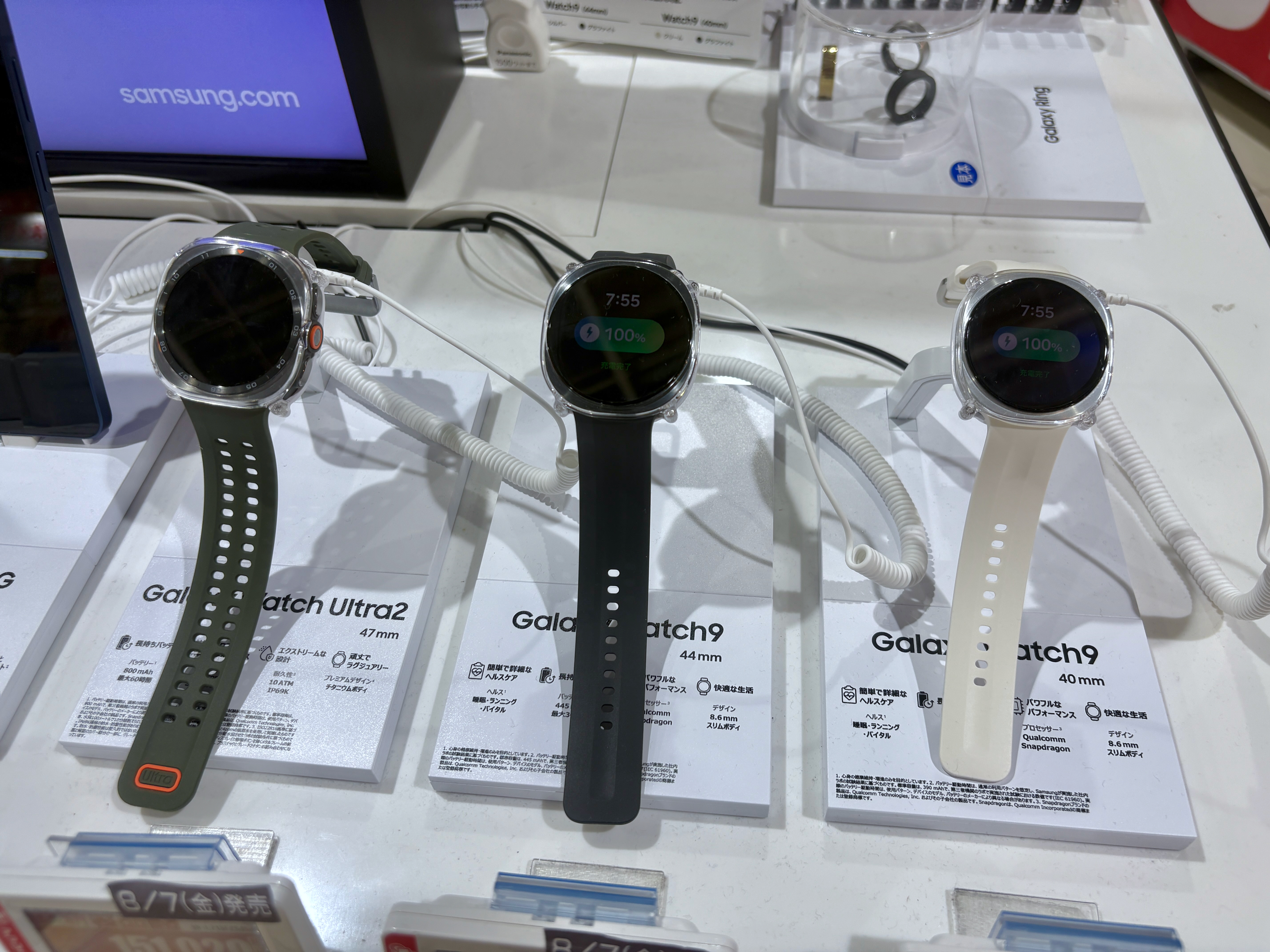
- The Samsung Galaxy Watch 9 (centre, right) and Samsung Galaxy Watch Ultra 2 (left)
- Brand: Samsung
- Manufacturer: Samsung Electronics
- Type: Smartwatch
- Series: Galaxy Watch
- Family: Samsung Galaxy
- First released: August 7, 2026; 3 months ago
- Availability by region: August 7, 2026; 3 months ago
- Predecessor: Samsung Galaxy Watch 8 Samsung Galaxy Watch Ultra
- Related: Samsung Galaxy Z Fold 8 Samsung Galaxy Z Flip 8
- Compatible networks: LTE models: 4G LTE
- Colors: Galaxy Watch 9 (40 mm): Graphite, Cream; Galaxy Watch 9 (44 mm): Graphite, Silver; Galaxy Watch Ultra 2: Titanium Silver, Titanium Gray
- Dimensions: Watch 9 (40 mm): 42.7 x 40.4 x 8.6 mm Watch 9 (44 mm): 46.0 x 43.7 x 8.6 mm Watch Ultra 2: 47.4 x 47.1 x 10.7 mm
- Weight: 31.5 g (1.11 oz) (40 mm); 34 g (1.2 oz) (44 mm); 61.5 g (2.17 oz) (Ultra 2, without strap)
- Operating system: Wear OS 7.0 with One UI 9 Watch
- System-on-chip: Qualcomm Snapdragon Wear Elite (SDW6100, penta-core, 3 nm)
- Memory: 2 GB RAM
- Storage: 32 GB (Watch 9); 64 GB (Watch Ultra 2)
- SIM: LTE models: eSIM
- Battery: 390 mAh (40 mm); 445 mAh (44 mm); 800 mAh (Ultra 2)
- Charging: Qi-based wireless charging Watch Ultra 2: high-frequency fast charging, up to 40% in about 30 minutes
- Display: Watch 9: Super AMOLED, 1.34 in (34 mm) 438×438 (40 mm),1.47 in (37 mm) 480×480 (44 mm), up to 3,000 nits Watch Ultra 2: Super AMOLED, 1.52 in (38.5 mm) 498×498, up to 5,000 nits Sapphire crystal
- Connectivity: Bluetooth 6.0; Wi-Fi 2.4 GHz + 5 GHz; NFC; GPS (L1+L5 dual-frequency)
- Data inputs: Accelerometer; Gyroscope; Barometer; Geomagnetic sensor Ambient light sensor Temperature sensor Samsung BioActive sensor
- Water resistance: Watch 9: IP68 + 5 ATM + MIL-STD-810H; Watch Ultra 2: IP69K + 10 ATM + MIL-STD-810H + EN13319
- Model: Watch 9 (40 mm): SM-L340 (Bluetooth), SM-L345 (LTE); Watch 9 (44 mm): SM-L350 (Bluetooth), SM-L355 (LTE); Watch Ultra 2: SM-L715 (LTE); Suffix varies by region and carrier
- Website: Galaxy Watch 9 Galaxy Watch Ultra 2

The Samsung Galaxy Watch 9 (stylized as Samsung Galaxy Watch9) and the Samsung Galaxy Watch Ultra 2 are Wear OS-based smartwatches manufactured, developed, designed, produced, and marketed by Samsung Electronics. It was announced on July 22, 2026 at the Samsung's Galaxy Unpacked event held in London, England, alongside the Galaxy Z Fold 8 series, the Galaxy Z Flip 8 and Galaxy Glasses.

== Specifications ==
	Pre-installed OS	OS Upgrades history					End of support
	Pre-installed OS	1st	2nd	3rd	4th	5th	End of support
Watch 9 Watch Ultra 2	Wear OS 7 (One UI Watch 9.0)						Within 2031
