= Samsung Galaxy Z Flip 8 =

2026 foldable smartphone by Samsung Electronics

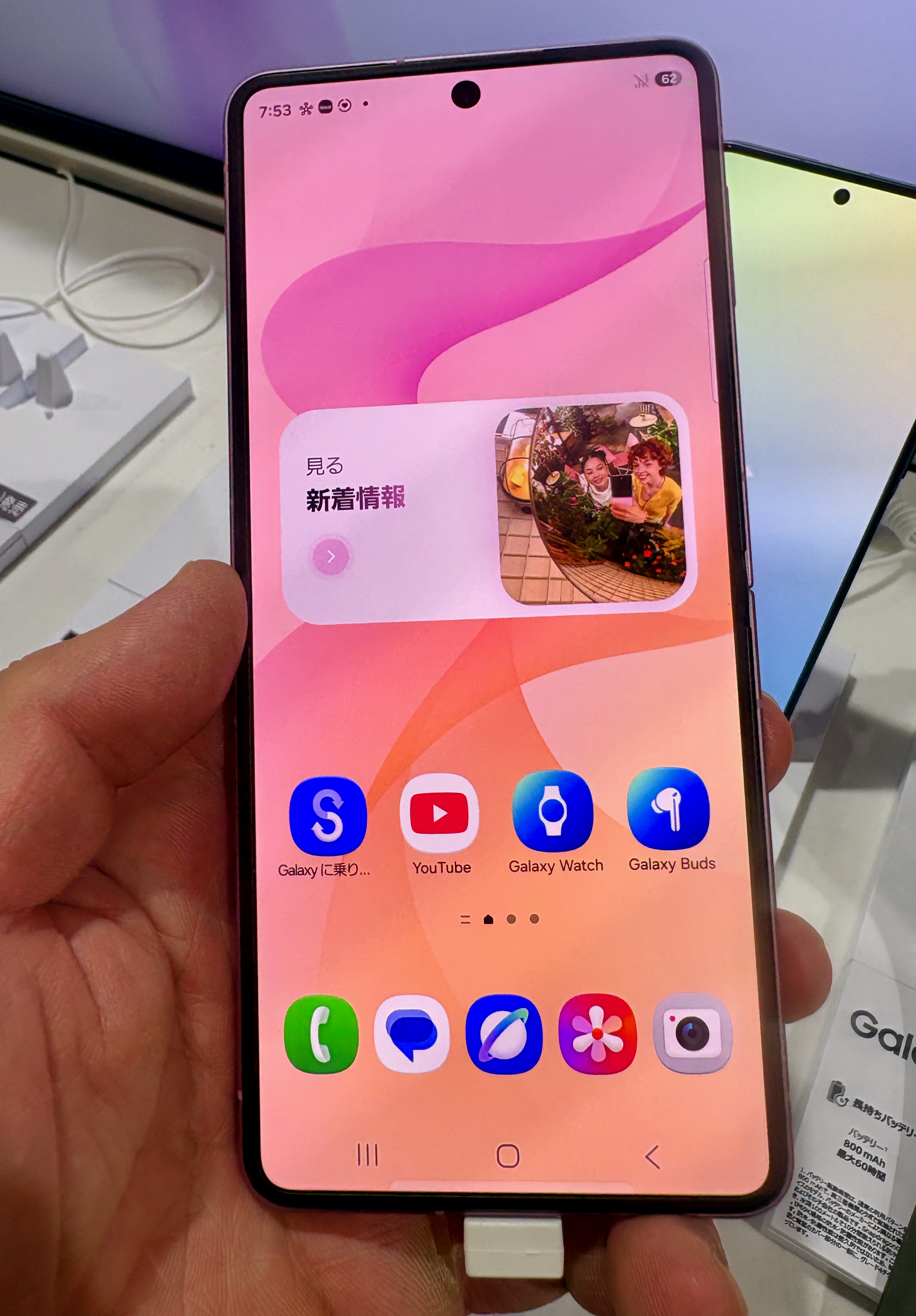
- The Samsung Galaxy Z Flip8 in unfolded form
- Also known as: Samsung Galaxy Flip 8 (in certain European countries)
- Brand: Samsung
- Manufacturer: Samsung Electronics
- Type: Foldable smartphone
- Series: Galaxy Z
- Family: Samsung Galaxy
- First released: August 7, 2026; 3 months ago
- Availability by region: August 7, 2026; 3 months ago
- Predecessor: Samsung Galaxy Z Flip 7
- Related: Samsung Galaxy S26; Samsung Galaxy Z Fold 8
- Compatible networks: 2G / 3G / 4G / 5G
- Form factor: Foldable (clamshell)
- Colors: Pink; Graphite; Cream; Mint (online exclusive)
- Dimensions: Unfolded: 166.9 × 75.4 × 6.1 mm Folded: 85.7 × 75.4 × 13.1 mm
- Weight: 180 g (6.63 oz)
- Operating system: Android 17, up to 7 major Android upgrades, One UI 9
- System-on-chip: Z Flip 8 (USA/Canada/China): Qualcomm Snapdragon 8 Elite Gen 5 for Galaxy (3 nm); Z Flip 8 (Worldwide): Samsung Exynos 2600 (2 nm)
- GPU: Z Flip 8 (USA/Canada/China): Adreno 840; Z Flip 8 (Worldwide): Xclipse 960
- Memory: 12GB
- Storage: 256GB, 512GB
- SIM: Nano-SIM + eSIM + eSIM (max 2 at a time)
- Battery: 4300 mAh silicon-carbon
- Charging: 25W wired (50% in 30 min), QC2.0; 15W wireless 4.5W reverse wireless
- Rear camera: 50 MP, f/1.8, 23 mm (wide), 1/1.57", 1.0 μm, dual pixel PDAF, OIS; 12 MP, f/2.2, 13 mm, 123° (ultrawide), 1/3.2", 1.12 μm LED flash, HDR, panorama 4K@30/60fps, 1080p@60/120/240fps, 720p@960fps, HDR10+
- Front camera: 10 MP, f/2.2, 23 mm (wide), 1/3.0", 1.22 μm HDR; 4K@30/60fps
- Display: Foldable Dynamic LTPO AMOLED 2X, 120Hz, HDR10+, 2600 nits (peak), 6.9 inches, 111.2 cm2 (~88.7% screen-to-body ratio), 1080 x 2520 pixels, 21:9 ratio (~397 ppi density)
- External display: Super AMOLED, 120Hz, 2600 nits (peak), 4.1 inches, 948 x 1048 pixels (Gorilla Glass Victus 2)
- Sound: Stereo speakers with 32-bit/384kHz audio
- Connectivity: Wi-Fi 802.11 a/b/g/n/ac/6e/7, tri-band, Wi-Fi Direct; Bluetooth 5.4, A2DP, LE; GPS, GALILEO, GLONASS, BDS, QZSS; USB Type-C 3.2 Gen 1, OTG
- Data inputs: Fingerprint (side-mounted); Accelerometer; Gyro; Proximity; Compass; Barometer
- Water resistance: IP48 (up to 1.5m for 30 minutes)
- Model: SM-F776x (last letter varies by carrier and international models)
- Website: Samsung Galaxy Z Flip8 (US)

The Samsung Galaxy Z Flip 8 (stylized as Samsung Galaxy Z Flip8) is an Android-based foldable smartphone manufactured, developed, designed and marketed by Samsung Electronics as the part of its Galaxy Z series. Unveiled on July 22, 2026 at Samsung's Galaxy Unpacked event held in London, England, alongside the Galaxy Z Fold 8 series, Galaxy Watch 9 series, and Galaxy Glasses, and were officially released on August 7, 2026, as the successor to the Samsung Galaxy Z Flip 7. Although it is the eighth main device in the Samsung Galaxy Z Flip series, Samsung used both Snapdragon and Exynos chips in key markets, and alongside the Galaxy Z Fold 8 series, it was the first phone with Android 17 pre-installed.

== History ==
Many of the Galaxy Z Flip 8 features and design changes were revealed prior to the official launch. This includes the use of the Qualcomm Snapdragon 8 Elite Gen 5 chipsets, screen protectors for the phone, color options and storage options ahead of launch. Chip options for the Flip device were also reported. Soon after, final renders for the phone with the official cases were also reported.

In July 2026, its Galaxy Unpacked launch dates were also accidentally revealed in a pre-order form. Final renders for the phone with the official screen protectors were also reported. Cases from a third-party manufacturer for the then-upcoming phones were also found, showing the listings for the Galaxy Z Flip 8 cases with integrated magnets for Qi2 wireless charging. Soon after, final renders for the phone with the official colors were also reported.

Initial reports suggested that the Galaxy Z Flip 8 would be Samsung’s last Flip phone, following its development of two Fold-style devices. In addition, actual units of the device were seen in South Korea, and marketing renders for the phone were also reported. Promotional image for the phone were also reported a week before the official launch, showing off the Galaxy Z Flip 8 in family photos, including marketing images, confirming the specifications and upgrades. Just a few weeks later, it became clear the Z Flip 8 would not be the last flip phone for the company.

=== Launch ===
On July 7, 2026, Android Headlines reported that Samsung was preparing to open up reservations for the next Galaxy Unpacked event. A few hours later, Samsung officially sent out invites for the next Galaxy Unpacked event set for July 22, 2026, in London, England, which showed a regular-sized Galaxy Z Fold 8, tearing off into a passport-like Galaxy Z Fold 8 with the tagline "A New Shape Unfolds".

The Galaxy Z Flip 8 was announced during the Samsung's Galaxy Unpacked event in London, England, on July 22, 2026 with a new processor, and slimmer chassis.

== Design ==
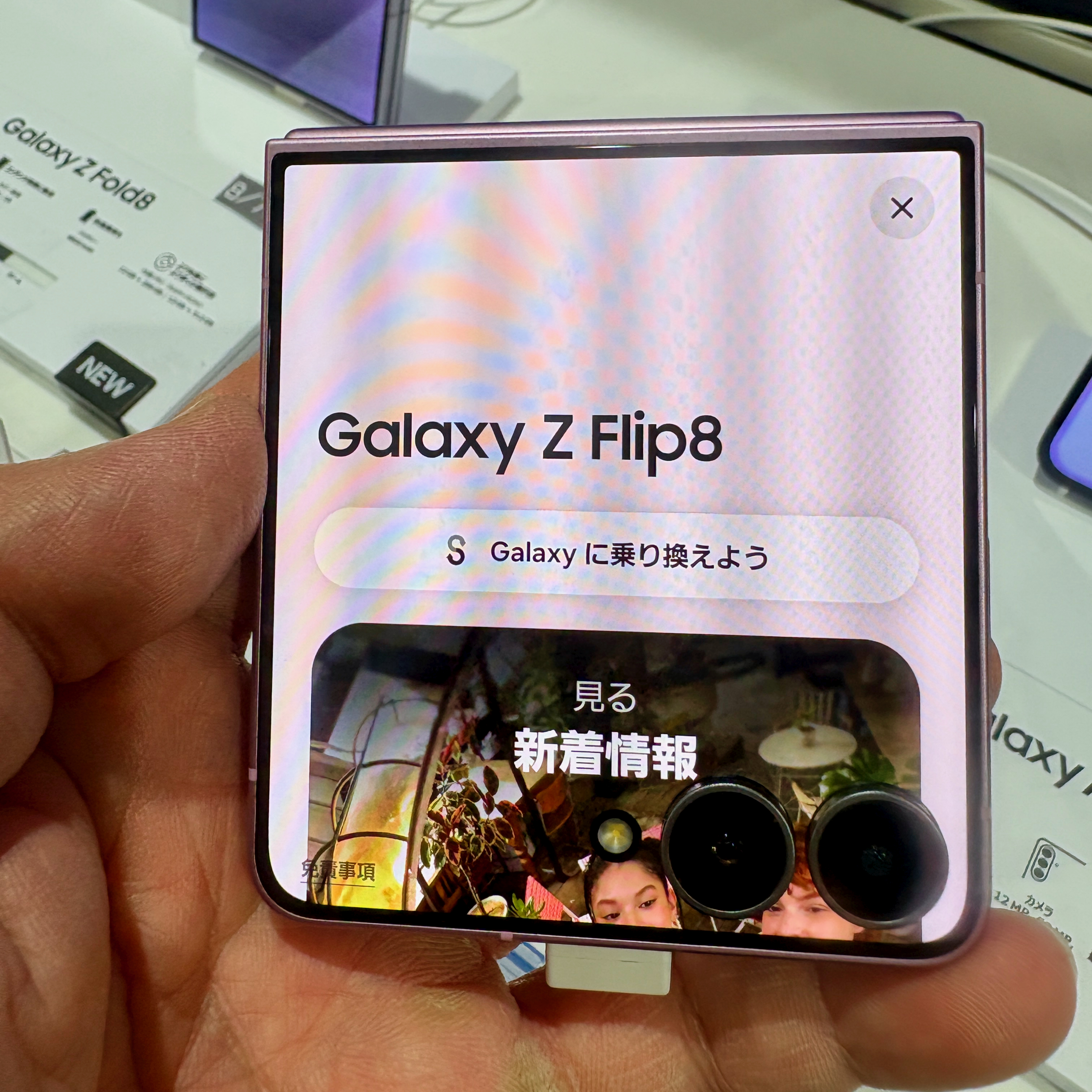
Back of the Galaxy Z Flip 8 in Pink (top)

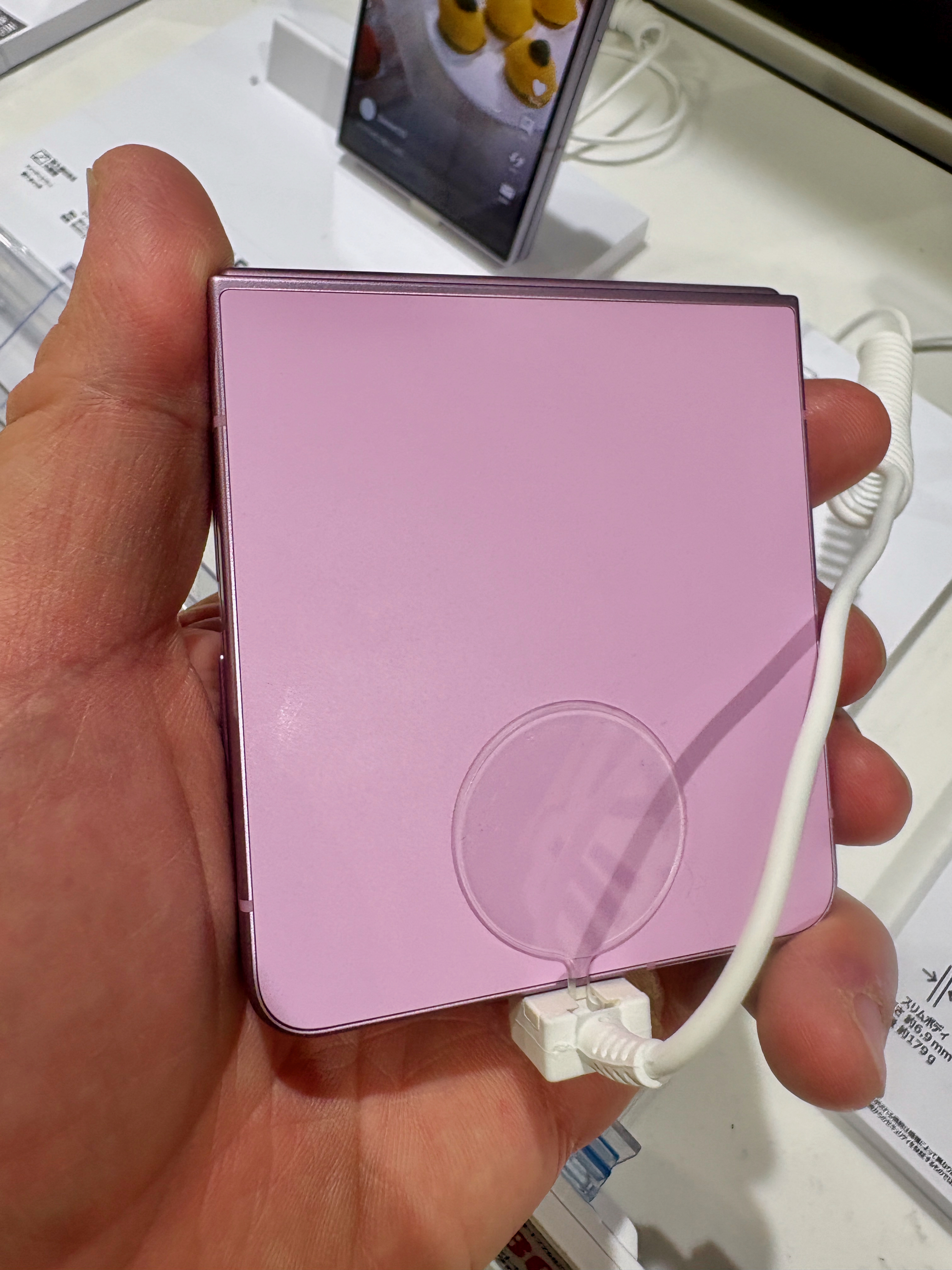
Back of the Galaxy Z Flip 8 in Pink (bottom)

At launch, the Galaxy Z Flip 8 is available in three color options: Cream, Graphite, and Pink. A fourth variant, Mint is available exclusively through Samsung's online store.

Model	Galaxy Z Flip 8
Base colors	Pink; Cream; Graphite
Online exclusive color	Mint

== Specifications ==
=== Display ===
==== Main display ====
The Galaxy Z Flip 8 features a 6.9‑inch Dynamic AMOLED 2X main display with a resolution of 2520 × 1080 pixels (21:9 aspect ratio) and a pixel density of approximately 397 ppi. It supports a variable refresh rate from 1 to 120 Hz, enabling adaptive performance based on content type. The display also supports HDR10+ and is protected by Ultra Thin Glass (UTG).

Inner display comparison
Feature	Galaxy Z Flip 8
Display size	6.9 inches
Display type	Dynamic AMOLED 2X
Resolution	2520 x 1080 (FHD+)
Aspect ratio	21:9 (same as Z Flip 7)
Refresh rate	1–120 Hz (adaptive)
Protection	Ultra Thin Glass + Gorilla Glass Victus 2

==== Cover screen and FlexWindow ====
The Galaxy Z Flip 8 features a 4.1‑inch Super AMOLED cover screen, referred to by Samsung as the FlexWindow, with a resolution of 1048 × 948 pixels and a refresh rate of up to 120 Hz.

The FlexWindow enables access to widgets, notifications, camera previews, and selected apps—such as Google Gemini, Now Bar, and Now Brief—without unfolding the device.

Outer display comparison
Feature	Galaxy Z Flip 8
Cover display Size	4.1 inches
Resolution	1048 × 948 pixels
Refresh Rate	Up to 120 Hz
Protection	Gorilla Glass Victus 2

=== Performance ===
The Galaxy Z Flip 8 is available with 12 GB of RAM, paired with either 256 GB or 512 GB of internal storage which utilizes UFS 4.0.

=== Battery ===
The Galaxy Z Flip 8 is equipped with a 4,300 mAh dual-cell battery. It supports 25W wired charging (compatible with USB Power Delivery 3.0 and Qualcomm Quick Charge 2.0),15W wireless and 4.5W reverse wireless charging. This series marks the first time to introduce silicon-carbon batteries.

Specification	Galaxy Z Flip 8
Battery capacity	4,300 mAh
Wired charging	25 W (USB Power Delivery 3.0, Quick Charge 2.0)
Fast charging speed	Up to 50% in approximately 30 minutes (under optimal conditions)
Wireless charging	15 W
Reverse wireless charging	4.5 W
References	

=== Camera ===
The Galaxy Z Flip 8 features a dual rear camera system, comprising a 50 MP wide-angle sensor (with optical image stabilization (OIS) and Dual Pixel autofocus) and a 12 MP ultra-wide sensor (offering a 123-degree field of view). Camera features include LED flash, HDR, and panorama.

The front-facing camera is a 10 MP sensor with HDR support and 4K video recording at 30 and 60 fps.

Specification	Galaxy Z Flip 8
Rear camera configuration	Dual: Main: 50 MP (f/1.8, 1/1.57", 1.0μm, OIS, Dual Pixel PDAF) Ultrawide: 12 MP (f/2.2, 123°, 1/3.2", 1.12μm)
Front camera	10 MP (f/2.2, 1/3.0", 1.22μm)
Photo features	LED flash, HDR, panorama
Video recording (rear)	4K@30/60fps, 1080p@60/120/240fps, 720p@960fps, HDR10+
Video recording (front)	4K@30/60fps

== Software ==
The Galaxy Z Flip 8 is shipped with Android 17 and One UI 9. Alongside the Galaxy Z Fold 8 & Z Fold 8 Ultra, it is promised to get up to seven years of operating system and security updates, which has been the software policy ever since the release of Galaxy Z Fold 6 and Galaxy Z Flip 6.

	Pre-installed OS	OS Upgrades history							End of support
	Pre-installed OS	1st	2nd	3rd	4th	5th	6th	7th	End of support
Z Flip 8	Android 17 (One UI 9.0)								Within 2033

== See also ==
- Samsung Galaxy Z series
- Samsung Galaxy Z Fold 8

Preceded by Samsung Galaxy Z Flip 7	Samsung Galaxy Z Flip 8; 2026	Succeeded by Current
