= Samsung Galaxy A05 =

2023 entry-level Android smartphones series

Samsung Galaxy A05 Samsung Galaxy A05s
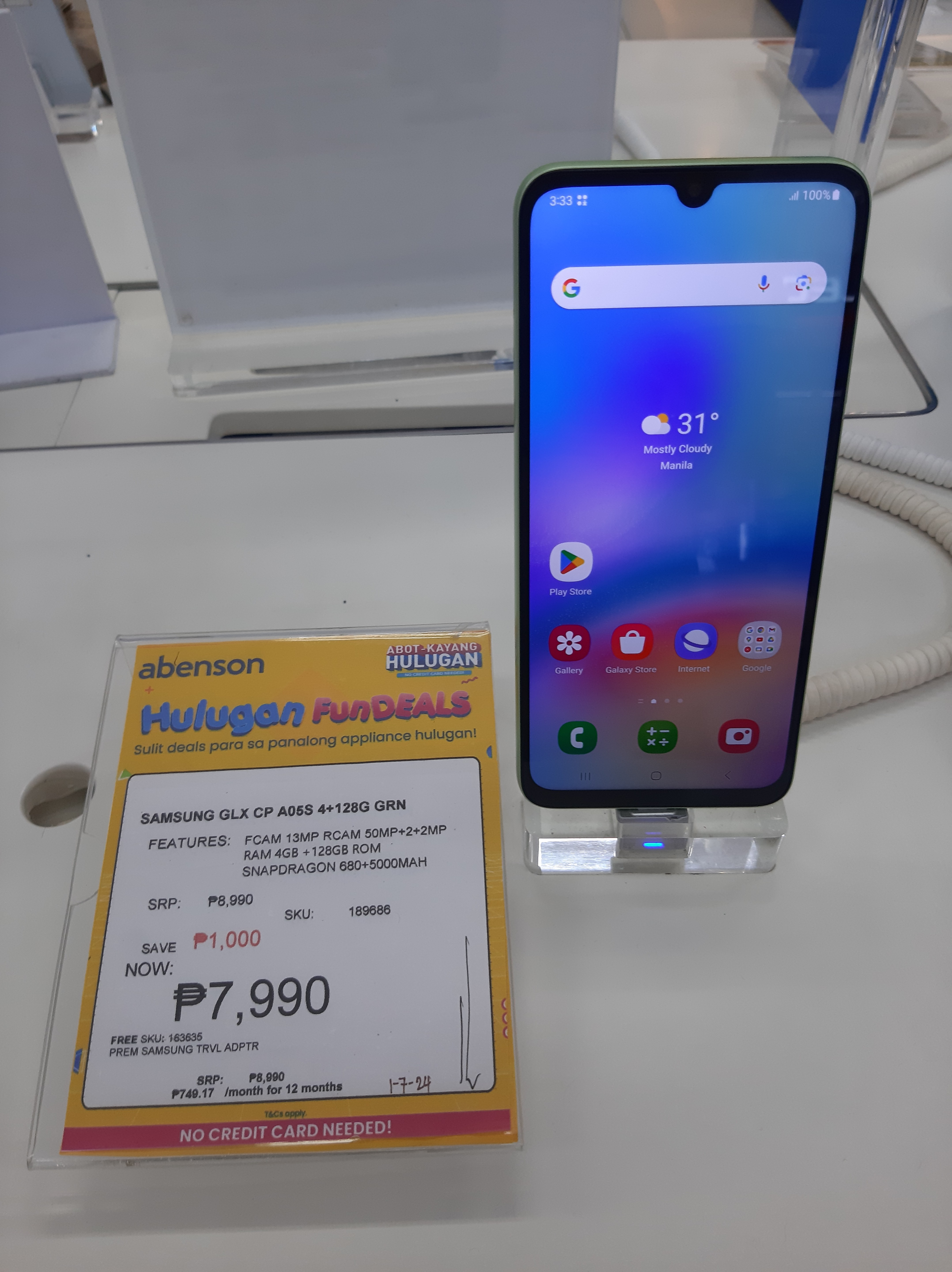
- Samsung Galaxy A05s
- Also sold as: Galaxy F05; Galaxy F14; Galaxy M05; Galaxy M14
- Brand: Samsung
- Manufacturer: Samsung Electronics
- Type: Phablet
- Series: Galaxy A/Galaxy M/Galaxy F
- Family: Samsung Galaxy
- First released: A05 & A05s: September 25, 2023; 3 years ago
- Availability by region: A05: October 15, 2023; 3 years ago A05s: October 18, 2023; 3 years ago M05: September 10, 2024; 2 years ago M14: March 6, 2024; 2 years ago F05: September 17, 2024; 2 years ago F14: August 2, 2024; 2 years ago
- Predecessor: Samsung Galaxy A04; Samsung Galaxy F04; Samsung Galaxy M04; Samsung Galaxy M13; Samsung Galaxy F13
- Successor: Samsung Galaxy A06
- Related: Samsung Galaxy A15; Samsung Galaxy A25 5G; Samsung Galaxy A35 5G; Samsung Galaxy A55 5G; Samsung Galaxy F14 5G; Samsung Galaxy F34 5G; Samsung Galaxy F15 5G; Samsung Galaxy F55 5G; Samsung Galaxy M14 5G; Samsung Galaxy M34 5G; Samsung Galaxy M54 5G; Samsung Galaxy M15 5G; Samsung Galaxy M35 5G; Samsung Galaxy M55 5G
- Compatible networks: 2G, 3G, 4G
- Form factor: Slate
- Colors: A05: Black, Light Green, Silver; A05s: Black, Light Green, Silver, Violet; F05: Twilight Blue; F14: Moonlight Silver, Peppermint Green; M05: Mint Green; M14: Arctic Blue, Sapphire Blue
- Weight: A05/F05/M05: 195 g (6.9 oz); A05s/F14/M14: 194 g (6.8 oz)
- Operating system: Original: A05/A05s/F14/M14: Android 13 with One UI Core 5.1; F05/M05: Android 14 with One UI 6.0; Current: A05/A05s/F14/M14: Android 15 with One UI 7.0; F05/M05: Android 16 with One UI 8.0
- System-on-chip: A05/F05/M05: Mediatek MT6769V/CZ Helio G85 (12nm); A05s/F14/M14: Qualcomm Snapdragon 680 Octa-Core 2GHz, 1.8GHz
- CPU: A05/F05/M05: Octa-core (2×2.0 GHz Cortex-A75 & 6×1.8 GHz Cortex-A55); A05s/F14/M14: Octa-core (4×2.4 GHz Kryo 265 Gold & 4×1.9 GHz Kryo 265 Silver)
- GPU: A05/F05/M05: Mali-G52 MC2; A05s/F14/M14: Adreno 610
- Memory: A05/A05s/M14: 4 GB, 6 GB; F05/F14/M05: 4 GB; LPDDR4X
- Storage: A05/A05s/M14: 64 GB, 128 GB; F05/F14/M05: 64 GB eMMC 5.1
- SIM: A05/A05s: Single SIM or Dual SIM (Nano-SIM); F05/F14/M05/M14: Dual SIM (Nano-SIM)
- Battery: 5000 mAh
- Charging: 25W fast charging
- Rear camera: Dual-Camera Setup; A05/F05/M05: Primary: GalaxyCore GC50E0; 50 MP, f/1.8, 25mm, FoV 80.8°, 1/2.51", 0.7µm, AF; Depth: GalaxyCore GC2375H; 2 MP, f/2.4, 1/5.0", 1.75µm; Triple-Camera Setup; A05s/F14/M14: Primary: Hynix Hi5022Q; 50 MP, f/1.8, 27mm, FoV 80.4°, 1/2.8", 0.64µm, AF; Macro: SuperPix SP2507; 2 MP, f/2.4, 1/5.0", 1.75µm; Depth: GalaxyCore GC2375H; 2 MP, f/2.4, 1/5.0", 1.75µm; Camera features: LED flash, panorama, HDR; Video recording: 1080p@30/60fps
- Front camera: A05/F05/M05: Hynix Hi-846; 8 MP, f/2.0, 26mm (wide), FoV 79.1°, 1/3.94", 1.12µm; A05s/F14/M14: Hynix Hi-1336; 13 MP, f/2.0, 25mm (wide), FoV 79.3°, 1/3.06", 1.12µm; Video recording: 1080p@30fps
- Display: 17.08 centimetres (6.72 in)
- Sound: Loudspeaker
- Connectivity: USB: Type-C, USB 2.0; Earjack: 3.5mm Stereo; Bluetooth: v5.3
- Data inputs: Touchscreen
- Model: A05: SM-A055x; A05s: SM-A057x; F05: SM-E055x; F14: SM-E145x; M05: SM-M055x; M14: SM-M145x (last letter varies by carrier and international models)
- Codename: A05/F05/M05: a05m A05s/F14/M14: a05s
- Website: Samsung Galaxy A Series Smartphone

The Samsung Galaxy A05 and Galaxy A05s are entry-level Android-based smartphones manufactured and developed by Samsung Electronics. They were announced on 25 September 2023 and were released on 15 October and 18 October 2023 respectively. It is part of the Galaxy A series.

Rebranded versions of the device were also released: the Galaxy M14 (not to be confused with Samsung Galaxy M14 5G, which is a rebranded Galaxy A14 5G) on 6 March 2024, the Galaxy F14 on 2 August 2024, the Galaxy M05 on 10 September 2024, and the Galaxy F05 on 17 September 2024. The former two devices are rebranded versions of the Galaxy A05s, while the latter two are rebranded versions of the Galaxy A05. It is the last Galaxy A0x model to be released with 4G connectivity only, as its successor would also have a 5G version.

== Specifications ==
=== Design ===
The front is made of glass, while the back is made of plastic. The back design varies by model: glossy plastic with stripes on the Galaxy A05, plastic with a leather-like texture on the Galaxy F05, simple glossy plastic on the Galaxy M05, and matte plastic on the Galaxy A05s, Galaxy F14, and Galaxy M14.

On the bottom side, there is a 3.5 mm audio jack, a microphone, a USB-C port and a speaker. On the top side, there is an additional microphone. On the left side, there is a single SIM or dual SIM tray depending on the regional models. On the right side, there is the volume rocker and the power button, which has a built-in fingerprint scanner on the Galaxy A05s, Galaxy F14 and Galaxy M14.

Galaxy A05	Galaxy A05s	Galaxy F05	Galaxy F14	Galaxy M05	Galaxy M14
Black; Light Green; Silver	Black; Light Green; Silver; Violet	Twilight Blue	Peppermint Green; Moonlight Silver	Mint Green	Arctic Blue; Sapphire Blue

=== Hardware ===
==== Display ====
All models have a 6.7 inch diagonal notched display and utilize PLS LCD technology. The only difference that set the models apart are the resolution and refresh rates.

	Galaxy A05 Galaxy M05 Galaxy F05	Galaxy A05s Galaxy M14 Galaxy F14
Screen Resolution	HD+, 720 × 1600	FHD+, 1080 × 2400
Refresh Rate	60 Hz	90 Hz

==== Battery ====
All devices are equipped with a 5000 mAh battery (like its predecessor), but now brings a faster 25W Fast Charging, an upgrade from the 15W from its predecessors.

==== Processor and memory ====
The Galaxy A05, Galaxy F05, and Galaxy M05 are equipped with the MediaTek Helio G85 SoC with the Mali-G52 MC2 GPU, while the Galaxy A05s, Galaxy F14, and Galaxy M14 feature the Qualcomm Snapdragon 680 4G SoC with the Adreno 610 GPU.

For all devices, RAM options are available in 4 or 6 GB, while storage options are available in 64 or 128 GB (both use eMMC 5.1).

==== Camera ====
The Galaxy A05, M05, and F05 feature a dual rear camera setup, consisting of a 50MP primary camera and a 2MP depth sensor. The front camera has an 8 MP sensor. The Galaxy A05s, M14, and F14 feature the same rear camera layout as the A05, with the addition of a 2 MP macro camera. The front camera, meanwhile, has a higher 13 MP resolution.

For all devices, it can record videos up to 1080p@30fps resolution from both the rear and front cameras.

=== Software ===
The Galaxy A05, Galaxy A05s, Galaxy F14, and Galaxy M14 were released with One UI Core 5.1 based on Android 13, while the Galaxy F05 and Galaxy M05 were released with One UI 6.0 based in Android 14, with the first four models being the last phones under the A0x, F1x and M1x lines respectively to support 32-bit applications. Like its predecessor, the devices are slated to receive 2 OS upgrades and 4 years of security updates.

	Pre-installed OS	OS Upgrades history		End of support
	Pre-installed OS	1st	2nd	End of support
A05	Android 13 (One UI Core 5.1)	Android 14 (One UI 6.0); January 2024 (One UI 6.1); July 2024	Android 15 (One UI 7.0); July 2025	Expected within 2027
M05	Android 14 (One UI 6.0)	Android 15 (One UI 7.0); July 2025	Android 16 (One UI 8.0); November 2025	Expected within 2028
F05	Android 14 (One UI 6.0)	Android 15 (One UI 7.0); July 2025	Android 16 (One UI 8.0); November 2025	Expected within 2028
A05s	Android 13 (One UI Core 5.1)	Android 14 (One UI 6.0); February 2024 (One UI 6.1); June 2024	Android 15 (One UI 7.0); May 2025	Expected within 2027
M14	Android 13 (One UI Core 5.1)			Expected within 2028
F14	Android 13 (One UI Core 5.1)			Expected within 2028

== Reception ==
According to Counterpoint Research, Samsung Galaxy A05 was the number 10 bestselling smartphone in the world in Q1 2024, and number 5 bestselling Android smartphone in the same quarter.
