= Samsung Galaxy M54 5G =

2023 Android-based smartphone by Samsung

Samsung Galaxy M54 5G (Samsung Galaxy F54 5G in India)
- Brand: Samsung Galaxy
- Developer: Samsung Electronics
- Manufacturer: Samsung Electronics
- Type: Phablet
- Series: Galaxy M/Galaxy F
- First released: M54: March 22, 2023; 3 years ago F54: June 6, 2023; 3 years ago
- Predecessor: Samsung Galaxy M53 5G; Samsung Galaxy F52 5G
- Successor: Samsung Galaxy M55 5G
- Related: Samsung Galaxy A54 5G; Samsung Galaxy M04; Samsung Galaxy M14; Samsung Galaxy M14 5G; Samsung Galaxy M34 5G; Samsung Galaxy F14 5G; Samsung Galaxy F34 5G
- Compatible networks: GSM / HSPA / LTE / 5G
- Form factor: Slate
- Colors: M54: Dark Blue, Silver; F54: Meteor Blue, Stardust Silver
- Dimensions: 164.9 mm (6.49 in) H 77.3 mm (3.04 in) W 8.4 mm (0.33 in) D
- Weight: 199 g (7.0 oz)
- Operating system: Original: Android 13 with One UI 5.1; Current: Android 16 with One UI 8.5
- System-on-chip: Exynos 1380 (5 nm)
- CPU: Octa-core (4x2.4 GHz Cortex-A78 & 4x2.0 GHz Cortex-A55)
- GPU: Mali-G68 MP5
- Modem: Samsung Exynos 1380
- Memory: 8 GB RAM
- Storage: M54: 128 and 256 GB; F54: 256 GB
- Removable storage: microSDXC
- SIM: Dual SIM (Nano-SIM, dual stand-by)
- Battery: 6000 mAh
- Charging: Fast charging 25W
- Rear camera: Triple-Camera Setup; Primary: Samsung ISOCELL S5KHM6; 108 MP, f/1.8, 23mm, FoV 87°, 1/1.67", 0.64μm, PDAF, OIS; Ultrawide: Samsung ISOCELL S5K4HA; 8 MP, f/2.2, 16mm, FoV 123°, 1/3.94", 1.12μm; Macro: GalaxyCore GC02M1; 2 MP, f/2.4, 26mm, 1/5.0", 1.75μm, fixed focus; Features: LED flash, panorama, HDR; Video: 4K@30fps, 1080p@30/60fps
- Front camera: Sony IMX 616; 32 MP, f/2.2, 25mm (wide), FoV 82.1°, 1/2.76", 0.8μm; Video: 4K@30fps, 1080p@30fps
- Display: 6.7 in (170 mm), Infinity-O Display; 1080 x 2400 px resolution, 20:9 aspect ratio (~393 ppi density); Super AMOLED Plus, 120Hz refresh rate
- Sound: Loudspeaker
- Connectivity: Wi-Fi 802.11 a/b/g/n/ac, dual-band, Wi-Fi Direct, hotspot Bluetooth 5.2, A2DP, LE; A-GPS, GLONASS, GALILEO, BDS
- Data inputs: USB Type-C 2.0; Fingerprint scanner (side-mounted); Accelerometer; Gyroscope; Proximity sensor; Compass
- Model: M54: SM-M546B, SM-M546B/DS; F54: SM-E546B, SM-E546B/DS
- Codename: m54x
- Made in: South Korea
- Website: https://www.samsung.com

The Samsung Galaxy M54 5G is a mid-range Android-based smartphone developed by Samsung Electronics as a part of its Galaxy M series. This phone was announced on 22 March 2023. In India, the Samsung Galaxy M54 5G was sold as the Samsung Galaxy F54 5G only in 8/256 GB memory configuration.

== Design ==
The front is made of Corning Gorilla Glass 5, while the back and frame are made of glossy.

On the bottom side, there is a microphone, a USB-C port and a speaker. On the top side, there is an additional microphone. On the left side, there is a dual SIM tray with a microSD slot. On the right side, there is the volume rocker and the power button, with a built-in fingerprint scanner.

The smartphones are sold in the following color options:

Color	Name	
Color	Galaxy M54 5G	Galaxy F54 5G
	Dark Blue	Meteor Blue
	Silver	Stardust Silver

== Specifications ==
=== Hardware ===
The smartphones are equipped with the same Exynos 1380 as the Samsung Galaxy A54 5G. The Galaxy M54 5G was sold in 128 GB and 256 GB storage variants, while the Galaxy F54 5G was sold only in 256 GB storage variant. Both smartphones feature 8 GB of RAM. The storage of both smartphones can be expanded by a microSD card to up to 1 TB.

The smartphones feature a non-removable lithium-polymer 6000 mAh battery and a 25 W fast charging support.

=== Software ===
The smartphones initially were released with One UI 5.1 based on Android 13 and later were updated to One UI 6.1 based on Android 14.
