= Samsung Galaxy M55 5G =

2024 mid-range Android smartphone by Samsung Electronics

Samsung Galaxy M55 5G Samsung Galaxy M55s 5G Samsung Galaxy F55 5G (Samsung Galaxy C55 5G in China)
- Brand: Samsung
- Manufacturer: Samsung Electronics
- Type: Phablet
- Series: Galaxy M/Galaxy F/Galaxy C
- Family: Samsung Galaxy
- First released: M55 5G: March 28, 2024; 2 years ago С55 5G: April 22, 2024; 2 years ago F55 5G: May 17, 2024; 2 years ago M55s 5G: September 24, 2024; 2 years ago
- Predecessor: Samsung Galaxy M54 5G
- Successor: Samsung Galaxy M56 5G
- Related: Samsung Galaxy M05; Samsung Galaxy M15 5G; Samsung Galaxy M35 5G
- Compatible networks: 2G, 3G, 4G, 5G
- Form factor: Slate
- Dimensions: 163.9×76.5×7.8 mm (6.45×3.01×0.31 in)
- Weight: 180 g (6 oz)
- Operating system: Original: Android 14 with One UI 6.1; Current: Android 16 with One UI 8.5
- System-on-chip: Qualcomm SM7450-AB Snapdragon 7 Gen 1 (4 nm)
- CPU: 8 cores (1×2.4 GHz Cortex-A710 & 3×2.36 GHz Cortex-A710 & 4×1.8 GHz Cortex-A510)
- GPU: Adreno 644
- Memory: M55 5G/F55 5G/C55 5G: 8/12 GB; LPDDR4X
- Storage: M55 5G/M55s 5G/F55 5G: 128/256 GB; C55 5G: 256 GB
- Removable storage: microSDXC up to 1 TB
- SIM: Hybrid Dual SIM (Nano-SIM)
- Battery: Non-removable, Li-Ion 5000 mAh
- Charging: 45 W fast charging
- Rear camera: 50 MP, f/1.8 (wide-angle), 1/1.56", 1 μm, PDAF, OIS + 8 MP, f/2.2, 123° (ultrawide) + 2 MP, f/2.4 (macro); LED flash, panorama, HDR; Video: 4K@30fps, 1080p@30/60fps, gyro-EIS, OIS
- Front camera: 50 MP, f/2.4 (wide-angle); HDR; Video: 4K@30fps, 1080p@30/60fps
- Display: Super AMOLED+, 120 Hz, 6.7", 2400 × 1080 (FHD+), 20:9, 393 ppi
- Sound: Stereo sound
- Data inputs: USB-C 2.0, Bluetooth 5.2 (A2DP, LE), NFC, Wi-Fi 802.11 a/b/g/n/ac/6 (dual-band, Wi-Fi Direct), GPS, A-GPS, GLONASS, Galileo, Beidou, QZSS
- Model: M55 5G: SM-M556B, SM-M556B/DS; M55s 5G: SM-M558B, SM-M558B/DS; F55 5G: SM-E556B, SM-E556B/DS; C55 5G: SM-C5560
- SAR: M55 5G/M55s 5G: Head 0.96 W/kg; Body 0.98 W/kg; F55 5G: Body 0.93 W/kg
- Other: Fingerprint scanner (under display, optical); Accelerometer; Gyroscope; Proximity sensor compass
- Website: Galaxy M55 5G; Galaxy F55 5G; Galaxy C55 5G

The Samsung Galaxy M55 5G is a mid-range Android-based smartphone manufactured and developed by Samsung Electronics, as part of its Galaxy M series. It was announced on March 28, 2024.

On April 22, 2024, the Samsung Galaxy C55 5G was announced in China, which is fundamentally different from the Galaxy M55 5G with the material of the back panel and colors. On May 17 of the same year, the Samsung Galaxy C55 5G was introduced in India as the Samsung Galaxy F55 5G. On September 24, 2024, the Samsung Galaxy M55s 5G was introduced featuring different rear panel design compared to the Galaxy M55 5G.

== Design ==
The front panel is made of glass, and the frame — of plastic. The back panel of the Galaxy M55 5G and Galaxy M55s 5G is made of plastic, and the Galaxy F55 5G and Galaxy C55 5G — of artificial leather.

At the bottom are the USB-C connector, speaker and microphone. A second microphone is located on the top. On the left side is a hybrid slot for 2 SIM-cards or 1 SIM-card and a microSD memory card up to 1 TB. On the right side are the volume control buttons and the lock button.

Smartphones are available in the following colors:

Galaxy M55 5G		Galaxy M55s 5G		Galaxy F55 5G		Galaxy C55 5G	
Color	Name	Color	Name	Color	Name	Color	Name
	Denim black		Black		Raisin black		Fashion black
	Light-green		Green		Apricot juice		Color orange
