= List of highways numbered 34 =

The following highways are numbered 34: for a list of roads numbered N34 : see list of N34 roads.

== International ==
- AH34 Asian Highway 34
- E34 European route E34
- Federal Rte 34

== Australia ==
- Cox Peninsula Road (Northern Territory)
- (Sydney)
- Maroondah Highway (Victoria)

== Canada ==
- Alberta Highway 34 (defunct)
- Manitoba Highway 34
- Ontario Highway 34
- Saskatchewan Highway 34

== Costa Rica ==
- National Route 34

== Czech Republic ==
- part of I/34 Highway; Czech: Silnice I/34

== Greece ==
- EO34 road

== India ==
- National Highway 34 (India)

== Israel ==
- Highway 34 (Israel)

== Italy ==
- Autostrada A34

== Japan ==
- Japan National Route 34
- Nagasaki Expressway
- Ōita Expressway

== Korea, South ==
- National Route 34

== Malaysia ==
- FT 34 Central Spine Road/Kota Bharu–Kuala Krai Expressway

== New Zealand ==
- New Zealand State Highway 34

== Thailand ==
- Debaratna Road, also known as Theppharat Road, Highway 34 Bang Na–Nong Mai Daeng Route, and Bang Na–Trat Road

== United Kingdom ==
- British A34 (Winchester-Salford)

== United States ==
- U.S. Route 34
- Alabama State Route 34
  - County Route 34 (Lee County, Alabama)
- California State Route 34
  - County Route J34 (California)
  - County Route S34 (California)
- Connecticut Route 34
- Delaware Route 34 (former)
- Georgia State Route 34
  - Georgia State Route 34 (1919–1926) (former)
- Hawaii Route 34 (former)
- Idaho State Highway 34
- Illinois Route 34
- Indiana State Road 34 (former)
- K-34 (Kansas highway)
- Kentucky Route 34
- Louisiana Highway 34
- Maryland Route 34
- M-34 (Michigan highway)
- Minnesota State Highway 34
  - County Road 34 (Hennepin County, Minnesota)
  - County Road 34 (Ramsey County, Minnesota)
- Missouri Route 34
- Nebraska Highway 34 (former)
  - Nebraska Link 34H
  - Nebraska Spur 34C
  - Nebraska Spur 34D
  - Nebraska Recreation Road 34J
  - Nebraska Recreation Road 34K
  - Nebraska Recreation Road 34L
- Nevada State Route 34 (former)
- New Jersey Route 34
  - County Route 34 (Bergen County, New Jersey)
  - County Route 34 (Monmouth County, New Jersey)
- New Mexico State Road 34
- New York State Route 34
  - County Route 34 (Cayuga County, New York)
  - County Route 34 (Chautauqua County, New York)
  - County Route 34 (Clinton County, New York)
  - County Route 34 (Dutchess County, New York)
  - County Route 34 (Erie County, New York)
  - County Route 34 (Genesee County, New York)
  - County Route 34 (Madison County, New York)
  - County Route 34 (Onondaga County, New York)
  - County Route 34 (Orange County, New York)
  - County Route 34 (Oswego County, New York)
  - County Route 34 (Otsego County, New York)
  - County Route 34 (Putnam County, New York)
  - County Route 34 (Schenectady County, New York)
  - County Route 34 (St. Lawrence County, New York)
  - County Route 34 (Steuben County, New York)
  - County Route 34 (Suffolk County, New York)
  - County Route 34 (Ulster County, New York)
  - County Route 34 (Warren County, New York)
- North Carolina Highway 34
- North Dakota Highway 34
- Ohio State Route 34
- Oklahoma State Highway 34
  - Oklahoma State Highway 34C
- Oregon Route 34
- Pennsylvania Route 34
- South Carolina Highway 34
- South Dakota Highway 34
- Tennessee State Route 34
- Texas State Highway 34
  - Texas State Highway Loop 34
  - Farm to Market Road 34
  - Texas Park Road 34
- Utah State Route 34
- Virginia State Route 34
  - Virginia State Route 34 (1923-1933) (former)
  - Virginia State Route 34 (1933-1940) (former)
- West Virginia Route 34
- Wisconsin Highway 34
- Wyoming Highway 34

Territories

- Guam Highway 34
- Puerto Rico Highway 34

== See also ==
- A34 (disambiguation)#Roads
- List of highways numbered 34A
- List of highways numbered 34B

Preceded by 33	Lists of highways 34	Succeeded by 35
