= Samsung Galaxy A04 =

2022 entry-level smartphones by Samsung Electronics

Samsung Galaxy A04 Samsung Galaxy A04s Samsung Galaxy A04e
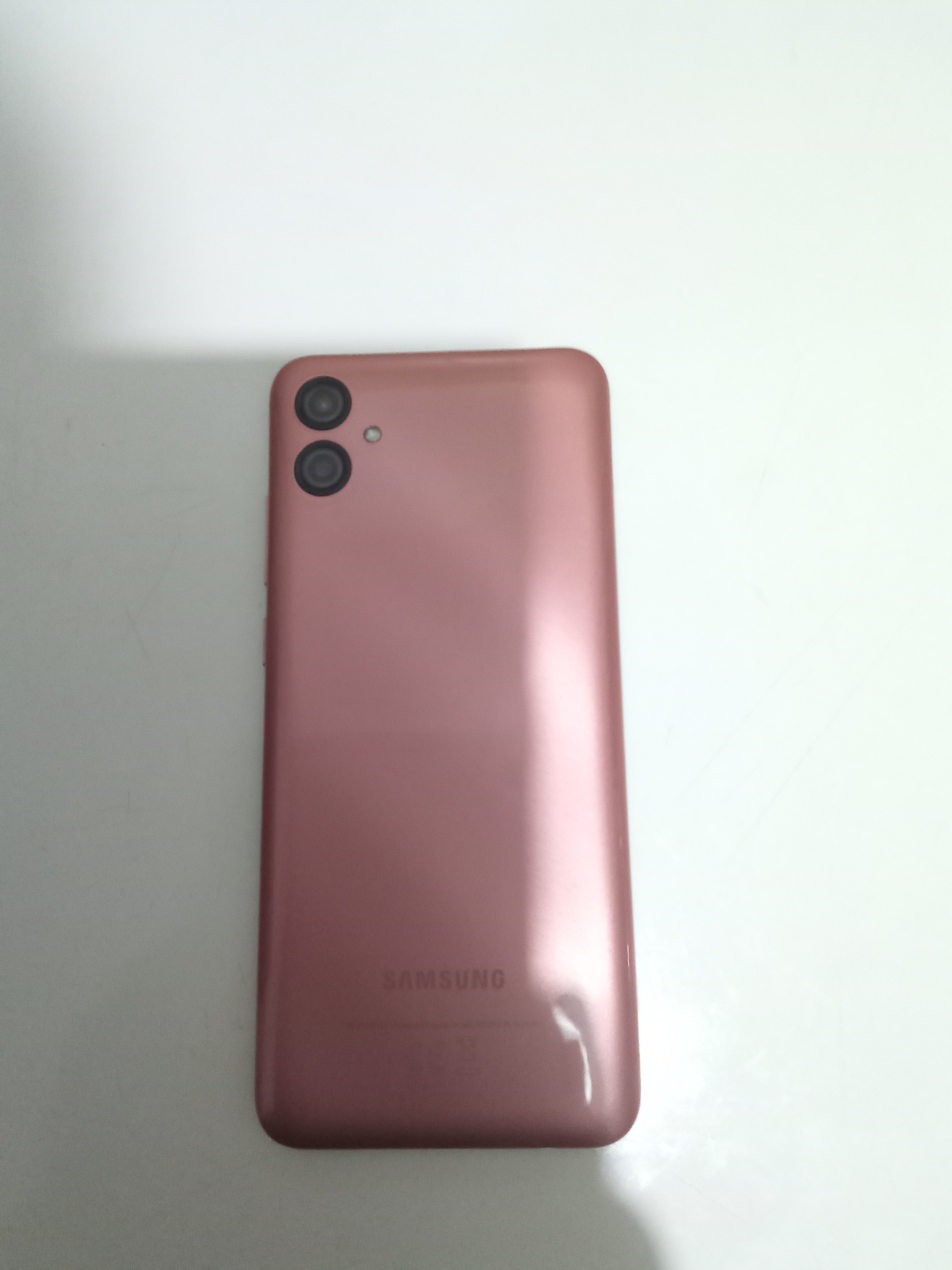
- The back of the Galaxy A04e in copper color
- Brand: Samsung
- Manufacturer: Samsung Electronics
- Type: Smartphone
- Series: Galaxy A
- Family: Samsung Galaxy
- First released: A04: August 24, 2022; 4 years ago A04s: August 31, 2022; 4 years ago A04e: October 21, 2022; 4 years ago
- Discontinued: January 25, 2025; 21 months ago
- Predecessor: Samsung Galaxy A03
- Successor: Samsung Galaxy A05
- Related: Samsung Galaxy A14; Samsung Galaxy A24; Samsung Galaxy A34 5G; Samsung Galaxy A54 5G; Samsung Galaxy M04
- Compatible networks: 2G / 3G / 4G
- Form factor: Slate
- Colors: Black, Green, White, Copper, Blue
- Dimensions: A04: 164.4 mm (6.47 in) H 76.3 mm (3.00 in) W 9.1 mm (0.36 in) D A04s: 164.7 mm (6.48 in) H 76.7 mm (3.02 in) W 9.1 mm (0.36 in) D A04e: 164.2 mm (6.46 in) H 75.9 mm (2.99 in) W 9.1 mm (0.36 in) D
- Weight: A04: 192 g (6.8 oz); A04s: 195 g (6.9 oz); A04e: 188 g (6.6 oz)
- Operating system: Original: Android 12 with One UI Core 4.1; Current: Android 14 with One UI 6.1
- System-on-chip: A04/A04e: MediaTek Helio P35 (12nm); A04s: Exynos 850 (8nm)
- CPU: A04/A04e: Octa-core (4x2.3 GHz Cortex-A53 & 4x1.8 GHz Cortex-A53); A04s: Octa-core (4x2.0 GHz Cortex-A55 & 4x2.0 GHz Cortex-A55)
- GPU: A04: PowerVR GE8320; A04s: Mali-G52
- Memory: 3 or 4 GB RAM
- Storage: 32, 64, 128 GB eMMC 5.1
- Removable storage: microSDXC
- SIM: Single SIM (Nano-SIM) or Dual SIM (Nano-SIM, dual stand-by)
- Battery: Li-Ion 5000 mAh
- Rear camera: Dual-Camera Setup; A04: Primary: Hynix Hi-5021Q; 50 MP, f/1.8, 25mm, FoV 80.8°, 1/2.55", 0.7µm, AF; Depth: SmartSens SC201CS; 2 MP, f/2.4, 1/5.1", 1.75µm; A04e: Primary: Hynix Hi-1336; 13 MP, f/2.2, 26mm, FoV 82.1°, 1/3.1", 1.12µm, AF; Depth: SmartSens SC201CS; 2 MP, f/2.4, 1/5.1", 1.75µm; Triple-Camera Setup; A04s: Primary: Samsung ISOCELL S5KJN1; 50 MP, f/1.8, 26mm, FoV 78.8°, 1/2.76", 0.64µm, PDAF; Macro: GalaxyCore GC02M1; 2 MP, f/2.4, 1/5.0", 1.75µm; Depth: GalaxyCore GC02M1B; 2 MP, f/2.4, 1/5.0", 1.75µm; Features: All: LED flash, panorama, HDR; Video: All: 1080p@30 fps
- Front camera: Hynix Hi-556; 5 MP, f/2.2, 27mm (wide), FoV 76.8°, 1/5.0", 1.12µm; Video: All: 720p@30 fps
- Display: 6.5 in (170 mm), Infinity-V Display; 720 × 1600 px resolution, 20:9 aspect ratio (~270 ppi density); PLS LCD
- Connectivity: Wi-Fi 802.11 a/b/g/n/ac, dual-band, Wi-Fi Direct, hotspot Bluetooth 5.0, A2DP, LE
- Data inputs: Multi-Touch screen; USB Type-C 2.0; Accelerometer; Proximity sensor
- Water resistance: none
- Model: A04: SM-A045x; A04s: SM-A047x; A04e: SM-A042x
- Website: Galaxy A04

The Samsung Galaxy A04 is a series of budget Android-based smartphones manufactured and developed by Samsung Electronics. It was announced on August 24, 2022. There were three different models released in this series: the base Galaxy A04, the Galaxy A04e, and the Galaxy A04s. A rebranded version of this device, which is known as the Galaxy M04, was released on December 10, 2022.

== Specifications ==
=== Design ===
All three devices use plastic back and frame, while the front uses glass with an unspecified protection.

Galaxy A04e	Galaxy A04 Galaxy A04s
Black; Copper; Light Blue	White; Copper; Green; Black

=== Hardware ===
==== Display ====
The phones features a 6.5-inch PLS LCD touchscreen with a resolution of 720 x 1600 (~270 ppi). It has a 60 Hz refresh rate for the A04e and A04, while the A04s has a 90 Hz refresh rate, a first for the overall A0x series.

==== Battery ====
The phones are equipped with a 5000 mAh battery, like its predecessors. The only difference between them are the charging speeds: 15W on the A04 and A04s, and no fast charging support for the Galaxy A04e.

==== Processor and memory ====
The Galaxy A04s use Samsung's Exynos 850 processor, while the A04e and A04 use MediaTek Helio P35. All devices come with either 3 or 4 GB of RAM, and internal storage ranging from 32 to 128 GB (all use eMMC 5.1). Internal storage can be expanded via a microSD card up to 512 GB.

==== Camera ====
The Samsung Galaxy A04 and A04e has a dual-camera setup, while the A04s has a triple-camera setup. All three devices have its camera modules arranged vertically on the left side of the rear of the phone along with the flash. The main camera is a 50 MP wide lens (for the A04 and A04s; A04e has a 13 MP main lens) and the second is a 2 MP depth sensor. An additional 2 MP macro sensor is also present for the A04s.

The main camera can record video up at 1080p at 30 fps. All three devices have a single 5 MP front-facing camera in a notch.

=== Software ===
The A04 series comes with One UI Core 4.1 over Android 12. Like other phones in the A0x series, it will receive 2 OS updates and 4 years of security updates.

	Pre-installed OS	OS Upgrades history		End of support
	Pre-installed OS	1st	2nd	End of support
A04	Android 12 (One UI Core 4.1)	Android 13 (One UI Core 5.0); February 2023 (One UI Core 5.1); June 2023	Android 14 (One UI 6.0); February 2024 (One UI 6.1); August 2024	Expected within 2026
A04e	Android 12 (One UI Core 4.1)	Android 13 (One UI Core 5.0); February 2023 (One UI Core 5.1); March 2023	Android 14 (One UI 6.0); February 2024	Expected within 2026
A04s	Android 12 (One UI Core 4.1)	Android 13 (One UI Core 5.0); December 2022 (One UI Core 5.1); March 2023	Android 14 (One UI 6.0); February 2024 (One UI 6.1); September 2024	October 2026

Preceded by Samsung Galaxy A03	Samsung Galaxy A04; 2022	Succeeded by Samsung Galaxy A05
