= Route 34 (disambiguation) =

Route 34 may refer to:

- Route 34 (WMATA), a bus route in Washington, D.C.
- London Buses route 34
- SEPTA Route 34, a Philadelphia Subway-Surface Trolley line.

== See also ==
- List of highways numbered 34
