= Samsung Galaxy A25 5G =

2024 Android-based smartphone manufactured by Samsung

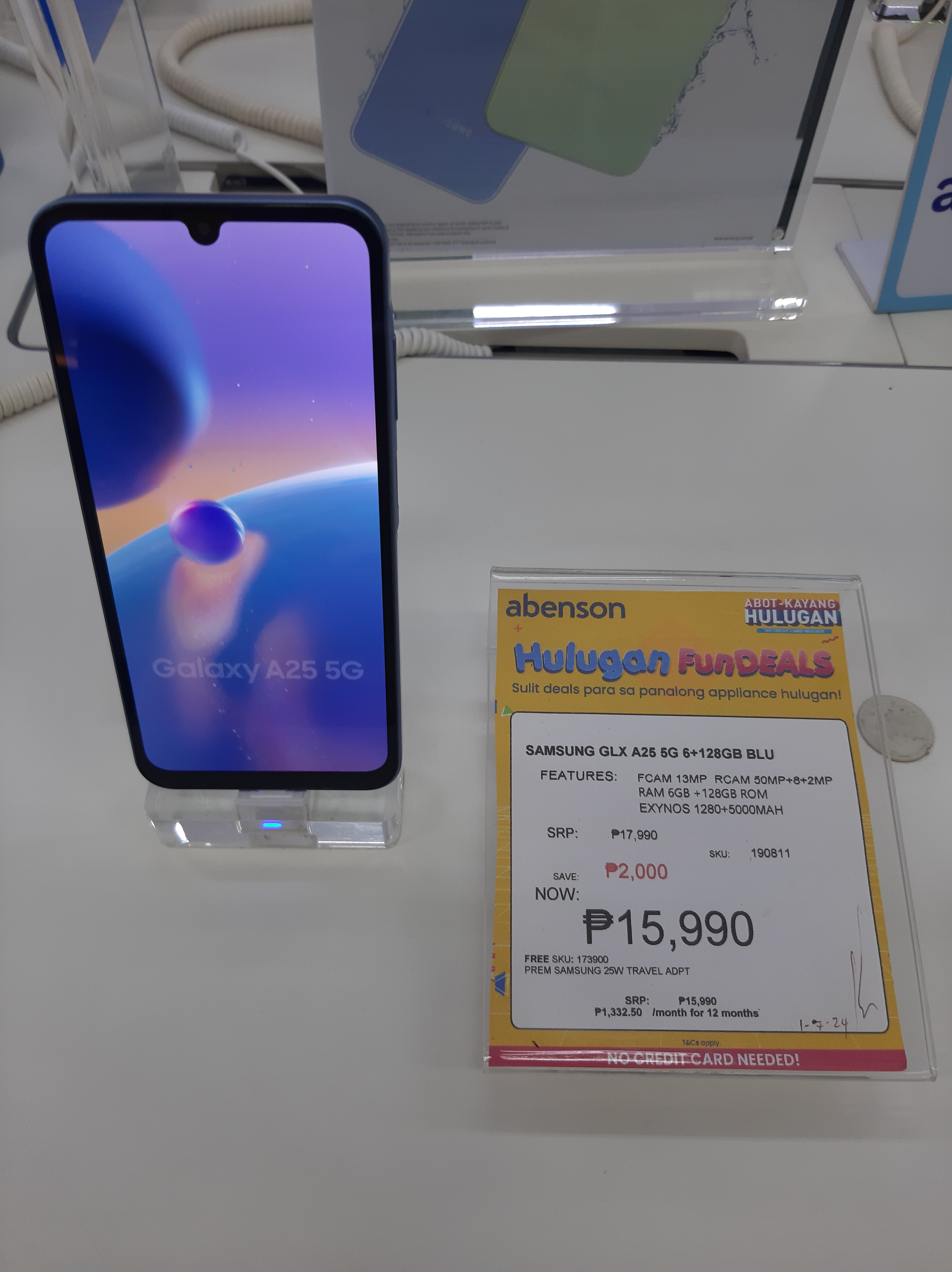
- Samsung Galaxy A25 5G on display in the Philippines
- Manufacturer: Samsung Electronics
- Type: Smartphone
- Series: Samsung Galaxy A series
- Family: Samsung Galaxy
- First released: December 16, 2023; 2 years ago
- Predecessor: Samsung Galaxy A24
- Successor: Samsung Galaxy A26 5G
- Related: Samsung Galaxy A05; Samsung Galaxy A15; Samsung Galaxy A35 5G; Samsung Galaxy A55 5G
- Compatible networks: 2G / 3G / 4G LTE / 5G NR
- Form factor: Slate
- Colors: Blue Black, Blue, Light Blue, Yellow
- Dimensions: 161 mm (6.3 in) H 76.5 mm (3.01 in) W 8.3 mm (0.33 in) D
- Weight: 197 g (6.9 oz)
- Operating system: Original: Android 14 with One UI 6.0; Current: Android 17 with One UI 9.0
- System-on-chip: Exynos 1280 (5 nm)
- CPU: Octa-core (2x2.4 GHz Cortex-A78 & 6x2.0 GHz Cortex-A55)
- GPU: Mali-G68
- Memory: 6, 8 GB RAM
- Storage: 128, 256 GB
- Removable storage: Micro SD up to 1TB
- SIM: Nano-SIM
- Battery: Li-Ion 5000 mAh
- Charging: Fast charging 25W (in-box charger not included)
- Rear camera: Triple-Camera Setup; Primary: Samsung ISOCELL (S5K)JN1; 50 MP, f/1.8, 27mm, FoV 78.5°, 1/2.76", 0.64µm, PDAF, OIS; Ultrawide: Samsung ISOCELL (S5K)4HA; 8 MP, f/2.2, 16mm, FoV 108.7°, 1/4.0", 1.12µm; Macro: GalaxyCore GC02M1; 2 MP, f/2.4, 1/5.0", 1.75µm, fixed focus; Camera features: LED flash, panorama, HDR; Video recording: 4K@30fps, 1080p@30/60fps, 720p@30fps; gyro-EIS
- Front camera: Hynix Hi-1339; 13 MP, f/2.2, 25mm (wide), FoV 81.1°, 1/3.06", 1.12µm; Video recording: 1080p@30fps
- Display: 6.5 in (170 mm); 1080 x 2340 px resolution, 19.5:9 ratio (~396 ppi density); Super AMOLED, 120Hz, 1000 nits (HBM)
- Sound: Stereo speakers
- Connectivity: Wi-Fi 802.11 a/b/g/n/ac, dual-band, Wi-Fi Direct; Bluetooth 5.3, A2DP, LE
- Data inputs: Multi-touch screen; USB Type-C 2.0; Fingerprint scanner; Accelerometer; Gyroscope; Compass

The Samsung Galaxy A25 5G is a mid-range Android-based smartphone designed, developed, and marketed by Samsung Electronics as a part of its Galaxy A series. It was announced on 11 December 2023 and was released along with the Samsung Galaxy A15 5 days later. It was released on January 17, 2024, in the United States.

Starting from this device model, only a 5G model would be released, with its predecessor being the last A2x model to be released with 4G connectivity only.

== Specifications ==
=== Design ===
The display is made of Corning Gorilla Glass 5. The frame and back panel are made of plastic. The design of the device looks almost similar to its predecessor, but the rear panel is now completely flat, and the transition between the rear panel and the camera unit is smoother.

On the right side are the volume buttons and the smartphone lock button combined with a fingerprint sensor. It is also the last A2x device to include a 3.5mm headset jack.

Galaxy A25 5G
- Light Blue
- Blue
- Blue Black
- Yellow

=== Hardware ===
==== Display ====
It has a 6.5 inch diagonal notched display, Super AMOLED type, rounded corners and a resolution of 1080 × 2340 pixels, with a maximum refresh rate of 120 Hz.

==== Battery ====
The Galaxy A25 5G is equipped with a 5000 mAh battery and 25W Fast Charging, like its predecessor.

==== Processor and memory ====
The chipset uses the Samsung Exynos 1280, which was first used on the Galaxy A33 5G and Galaxy A53 5G. Its internal storage is either 128 or 256 GB (which uses UFS 2.2) expandable with a microSD card up to 1 TB, while the RAM options are either in 6 or 8 GB.

==== Camera ====
The device features a rear triple-camera setup: 50 MP main (now with OIS, a first in the Galaxy A2x series), 8 MP ultrawide (up from the 5 MP on its predecessor), 2 MP macro. Its front camera has a 13 MP sensor. It can record videos up to 4K@30fps for the rear only and 1080p@60fps at both rear and front.

Camera		Resolution	Aperture	Video recording resolution
Rear	Wide (main)	50 MP (OIS)	f/1.8	4K@30fps
Rear	Ultra-wide	8 MP	f/2.2	1080p@30fps
Rear	Macro	2 MP	f/2.4	—
Front camera		13 MP	f/2.2	1080p@30fps

=== Software ===
Alongside the Galaxy A15, Galaxy A35, and the Galaxy A55 5G, the device is slated to receive 4 OS upgrades and 5 years of security updates (expected within 2028). It also marks the last time these devices will receive this level of support, as its successors all had 6 years of support.

Starting with the Galaxy A25, the Galaxy A2x series no longer supports 32-bit ARMv7 applications due to restrictions in the SoC. Devices that were released prior to the Galaxy A25 continue to support 32-bit apps.

	Pre-installed OS	OS Upgrades history				End of support
	Pre-installed OS	1st	2nd	3rd	4th	End of support
A25 5G	Android 14 (One UI 6.0)	Android 15 (One UI 7.0); May 2025	Android 16 (One UI 8.0); October 2025 (One UI 8.5); June 2026	Android 17 (One UI 9.0); November 2026		Within 2029
