= List of highways numbered 34A =

The following highways are numbered 34A:

== Greece ==
- EO34a road, a branch of the EO34 road from Volos to Karavona

== United States ==
- Nebraska Spur 34A
- Nevada State Route 34A (former)
- New York State Route 34A (former)
  - County Route 34A (Otsego County, New York)
- Oklahoma State Highway 34A
