= Samsung Galaxy M34 5G =

2023 mid-range smartphone by Samsung Electronics

- Brand: Samsung
- Manufacturer: Samsung Electronics
- Type: Smartphone
- Series: Galaxy M
- Family: Samsung Galaxy
- First released: July 7, 2023; 3 years ago
- Availability by region: July 15, 2023; 3 years ago
- Predecessor: Samsung Galaxy M33 5G
- Successor: Samsung Galaxy M35 5G
- Related: Samsung Galaxy A34; Samsung Galaxy M04; Samsung Galaxy M14; Samsung Galaxy M54 5G
- Compatible networks: 2G / 3G / 4G / 5G
- Form factor: Slate
- Dimensions: 161.7 mm × 77.2 mm × 8.8 mm (6.37 in × 3.04 in × 0.35 in)
- Weight: 208 g (7.3 oz)
- Operating system: Original: Android 13 with One UI 5.1; Current: Android 16 with One UI 8.5
- CPU: Samsung Exynos 1280 (5 nm)
- GPU: Mali-G68 MP4
- Memory: 6GB or 8GB LPDDR4X
- Storage: 128GB or 256GB UFS2.2
- Removable storage: Yes(hybrid slot, microSDXC up to 1TB)
- SIM: Hybrid Dual nanoSIM, DSDS
- Battery: Li-Po 6000 mAh, non-removable
- Charging: 25W Super Fast Charging
- Rear camera: Primary: Samsung ISOCELL S5KJN1; 50 MP, f/1.8, 27mm, 1/2.76", 0.64µm, PDAF, OIS; Ultrawide: Samsung ISOCELL S5K4HA; 8 MP, f/2.2, 16mm, 120˚, 1/4.0", 1.12µm; Macro: GalaxyCore GC02M1; 2 MP, f/2.4, 1/5.0", 1.75µm, fixed focus; LED flash, panorama, HDR; 4K@30fps, 1080p@30fps
- Front camera: Hynix Hi-1339; 13 MP, f/2.2, 25mm (wide), 1/3.06", 1.12µm; 1080p@30fps
- Display: 6.6 in (170 mm), 1080 x 2340 pixels, Super AMOLED 120Hz 19.5:9 ratio (~396 ppi density), 1000 nits peak brightness Corning Gorilla Glass 5, (8-bit, 16M Colors)
- Model: SM-M346B
- Website: Galaxy M34 5G

Samsung Galaxy M34 5G is a mid-range Android-based smartphone as part of the Galaxy M series, released in July 2023. Samsung Galaxy M34 5G was launched on July 7, 2023. The phone comes with a 120 Hz refresh rate 6.50-inch touchscreen display offering a resolution of 1080x2400 pixels (FHD+). Samsung Galaxy M34 5G is powered by an octa-core processor, Exynos 1280 based on 5nm manufacturing process. It comes with 6GB, 8GB of RAM. The Samsung Galaxy M34 5G runs Android 13 and is powered by a 6000mAh non-removable battery. The Samsung Galaxy M34 5G supports proprietary fast charging.

As far as the cameras are concerned, the Samsung Galaxy M34 5G on the rear packs a triple camera setup featuring a 50-megapixel primary camera, and an 8-megapixel camera. It has a single front camera setup for selfies, featuring a 13-megapixel sensor.

The Samsung Galaxy M34 5G runs OneUI 5 is based on Android 13 and packs 128GB, 256GB of inbuilt storage. It was launched in Midnight Blue, Prism Silver, and Waterfall Blue colours.

The phone is upgradeable to One UI 6.1 based on Android 14.
