= Samsung Galaxy A55 5G =

2024 Android-based smartphone by Samsung

Samsung Galaxy A55 5G Samsung Galaxy Quantum5
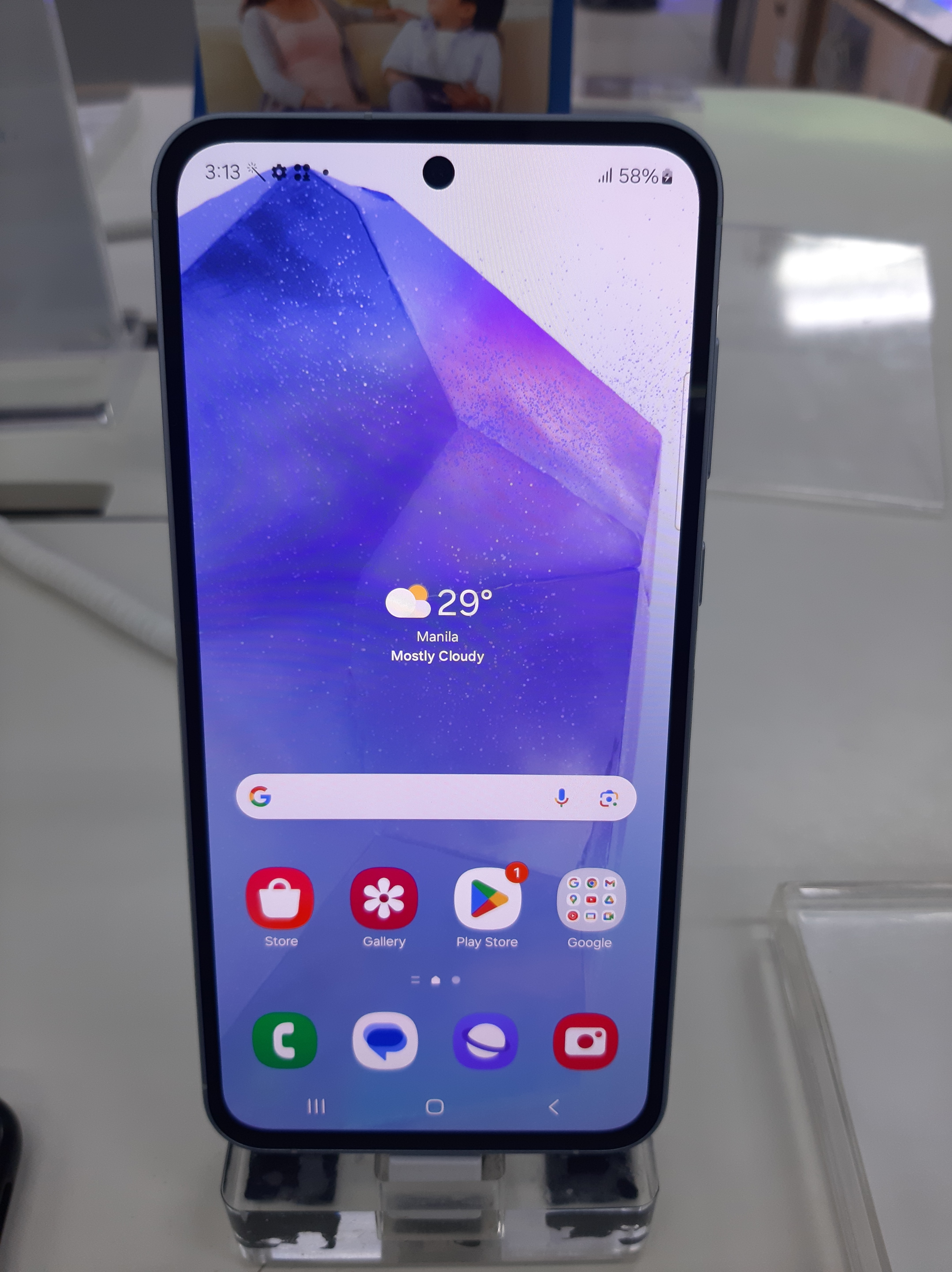
- Brand: Samsung Galaxy
- Manufacturer: Samsung Electronics
- Type: Smartphone
- Series: Samsung Galaxy A series
- First released: March 15, 2024; 2 years ago
- Predecessor: Samsung Galaxy A54 5G
- Successor: Samsung Galaxy A56 5G
- Related: Samsung Galaxy A05; Samsung Galaxy A15; Samsung Galaxy A25 5G; Samsung Galaxy A35 5G
- Compatible networks: GSM / HSPA / LTE / 5G
- Form factor: Slate
- Colors: Awesome Iceblue, Awesome Lilac, Awesome Lemon, Awesome Navy
- Dimensions: 161.1 mm (6.34 in) H 77.4 mm (3.05 in) W 8.2 mm (0.32 in) D
- Weight: 213 g (7.5 oz)
- Operating system: Original: Android 14 with One UI 6.1; Current: Android 17 with One UI 9.0
- System-on-chip: Exynos 1480
- CPU: Octa-core (4x2.7 GHz Cortex-A78 & 4x2.0 GHz Cortex-A55)
- GPU: Xclipse 530
- Memory: 8 and 12 GB RAM
- Storage: 128 and 256 GB
- SIM: Nano-SIM and eSIM or dual SIM (Nano-SIM)
- Battery: Li-Ion 5000 mAh
- Charging: Super Fast charging 25W
- Rear camera: Triple-Camera Setup; Primary: Sony IMX 906; 50 MP, f/1.8, 23mm, FoV 85.3°, 1/1.56", 1.0µm, PDAF, OIS; Ultrawide: Sony IMX 258; 12 MP, f/2.2, 13mm, FoV 116.3°, 1/3.06", 1.12µm; Macro: 5 MP, f/2.4, fixed focus; Camera features: LED flash, panorama, HDR; Video recording: 4K@30fps, 1080p@30/60fps, 720p@480fps; gyro-EIS
- Front camera: Sony IMX 616; 32 MP, f/2.2, 26mm (wide), FoV 82.5°, 1/2.74", 0.8µm; Video recording: 4K@30fps, 1080p@30/60fps
- Display: 6.6 in (170 mm); 1080 × 2340 px resolution, 19.5:9 ratio (~396 ppi density); Super AMOLED, 120Hz refresh rate, HDR10+ Always On
- Sound: Stereo speakers
- Connectivity: Wi-Fi 6 802.11 a/b/g/n/ac/ax (dual-band, Wi-Fi Direct); Bluetooth 5.3 (A2DP, LE)
- Data inputs: Multi-Touch screen; USB Type-C 2.0; Fingerprint scanner; Accelerometer; Gyroscope; Barometer
- Water resistance: IP67
- Model: SM-A5560, SM-A556B, SM-A556B/DS, SM-A556E, SM-A556E/DS, SM-A556V
- Website: www.samsung.com/us/smartphones/galaxy-a55-5g/

The Samsung Galaxy A55 5G is a mid-range Android-based smartphone developed and manufactured by Samsung Electronics as a part of its Galaxy A series. It was announced on March 11, 2024 and was released four days later, alongside the Galaxy A35 5G.

In South Korea, the device is sold as the Galaxy Quantum5, announced and released on September 1, 2024.

== Specifications ==
=== Design ===
The front is made of Corning Gorilla Glass Victus+. The back is made of Gorilla Glass Victus+ and has an aluminium frame. It marks the return of the aluminum frame for the first time since the relaunching of the Galaxy A series. It also features IP67 dust and water resistance. The design of the Galaxy A55 5G features a flat frame and the Key Island.

Galaxy A55 5G
- Awesome Iceblue
- Awesome Lilac
- Awesome Lemon
- Awesome Navy

=== Hardware ===
==== Processor and memory ====
The Galaxy A55 5G is equipped with the in-house Exynos 1480 SoC, which features the Xclipse 530 graphics processing unit, co-developed with AMD and based on the RDNA 2 architecture. It is paired with 8 GB or 12 GB of RAM (with the latter a first for the overall Galaxy A series) and 128 GB or 256 GB of internal storage. It supports expandable storage via a microSD card slot.

==== Battery ====
The smartphone features a non-removable Li-Ion 5000 mAh battery with a 25 W fast charging support, similar to its predecessor.

==== Camera ====
The Galaxy A55 5G has a triple rear camera setup, including a 50 MP Sony IMX906 wide-angle lens with an f/1.8 aperture, phase detection autofocus, and optical image stabilization; a 12 MP Sony IMX258 ultrawide-angle lens with an f/2.2 aperture and a 123° field of view; and a 5 MP macro lens with an f/2.4 aperture. The smartphone also features a front-facing 32 MP Sony IMX616 wide-angle camera with an f/2.2 aperture. Both main and front cameras can record video in 4K resolution at 30 fps.

==== Ports and connectivity ====
On the bottom of the smartphone, there is a USB-C 2.0 port, two microphones and a loudspeaker. On the top, there is an additional microphone and, depending on the model, either a hybrid dual SIM tray (SIM 1 + SIM 2 or SIM 1 + microSD) or a single SIM tray.

=== Software ===
Alongside the Galaxy A15, Galaxy A25, and the Galaxy A35 5G, the device is slated to receive 4 OS upgrades and 5 years of security updates. It also marks the last time these devices will receive this level of support, as its successors all had 6 years of support. It is the first Galaxy A5x device to support Google's Seamless Updates (which it works by installing updates to a secondary system partition that the device boots from whenever it is restarted).

Starting with the Galaxy A55, the Galaxy A5x series no longer supports 32-bit ARMv7 applications due to restrictions in the SoC. Devices that were released prior to the Galaxy A55 continue to support 32-bit apps.

| | Pre-installed OS | OS Upgrades history | | | | End of support |
| | Pre-installed OS | 1st | 2nd | 3rd | 4th | End of support |
|---|---|---|---|---|---|---|
| A55 5G | Android 14 (One UI 6.1) | Android 15 (One UI 7.0); May 2025 | Android 16 (One UI 8.0); September 2025 (One UI 8.5); May 2026 | Android 17 (One UI 9.0); October 2026 | | Expected within 2029 |

| Preceded by Samsung Galaxy A54 5G | Samsung Galaxy A55 5G; 2024 | Succeeded by Samsung Galaxy A56 5G |
