= Samsung Galaxy M35 5G =

2024 Android-based smartphone by Samsung Electronics

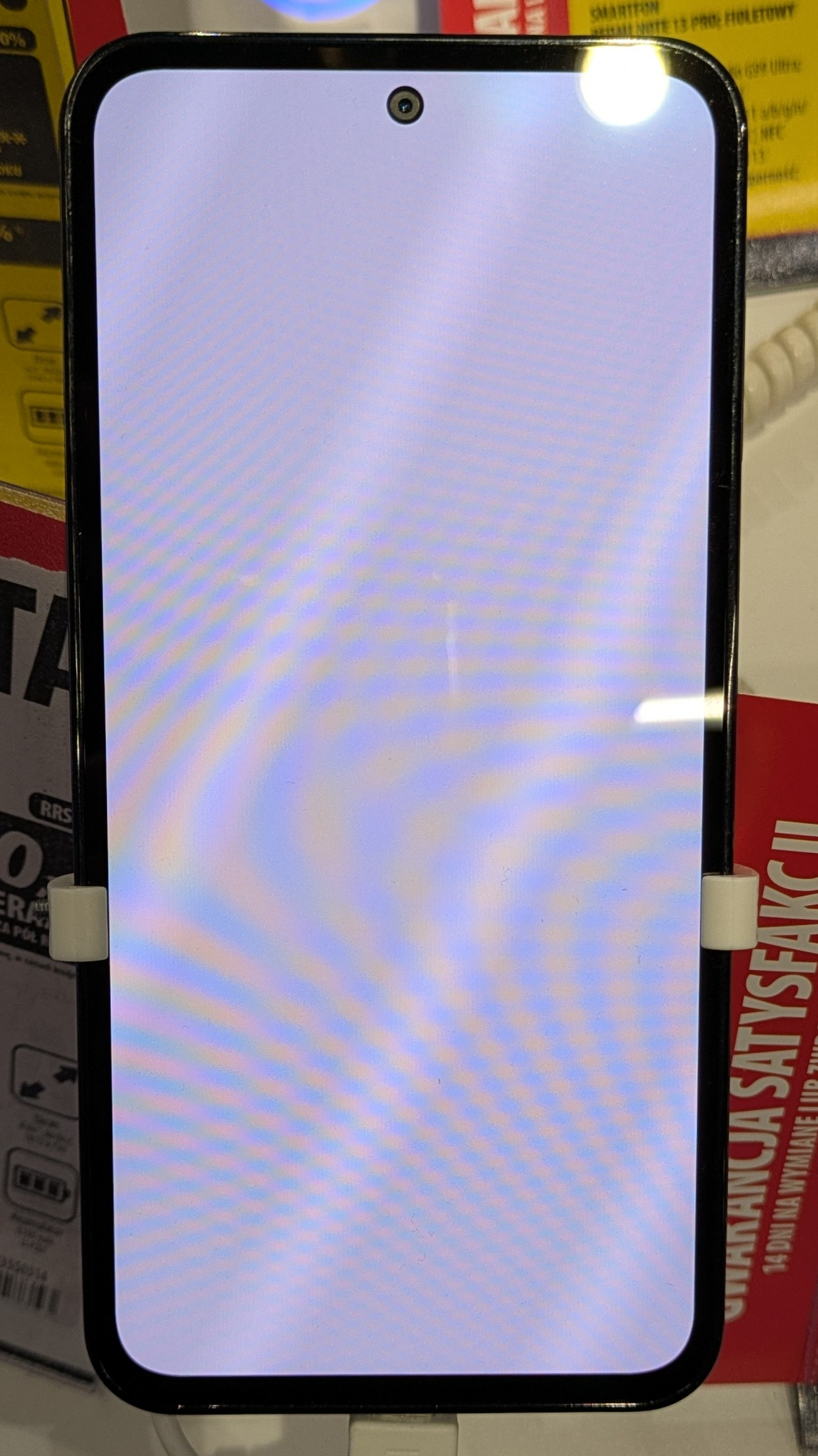
- Brand: Samsung
- Manufacturer: Samsung Electronics
- Type: Smartphone
- Series: Galaxy M
- Family: Samsung Galaxy
- First released: July 17, 2024; 2 years ago
- Predecessor: Samsung Galaxy M34 5G
- Successor: Samsung Galaxy M36 5G
- Related: Samsung Galaxy M05 5G; Samsung Galaxy M15 5G; Samsung Galaxy M55 5G
- Compatible networks: GSM / HSPA / LTE / 5G
- Form factor: Slate
- Colors: Thunder Grey, DayBreak Blue, Moonlight Blue
- Dimensions: 162.3 mm (6.39 in) H 78.6 mm (3.09 in) W 9.1 mm (0.36 in) D
- Weight: 222 g (7.8 oz)
- Operating system: Original: Android 14 with One UI 6 Current: Android 17 with One UI 9; 4 Years OS Upgrades in Total
- System-on-chip: Samsung Exynos 1380 (5 nm)
- CPU: Octa-core (4x2.4 GHz Cortex-A78 & 4x2.0 GHz Cortex-A55)
- GPU: Mali-G68 MP5
- Memory: 6 GB, 8 GB RAM
- Storage: 128 GB, 256 GB, UFS 2.2
- Removable storage: MicroSDXC up to 1 TB
- SIM: Dual SIM (Nano-SIM, dual stand-by)
- Battery: 6000 mAh
- Charging: Super Fast charging up to 25W
- Rear camera: 50 MP, f/1.8, (wide), PDAF, OIS; 8 MP, f/2.2, (ultrawide), 1/4", 1.12 μm 5 MP, f/2.4, (macro); LED flash, panorama, HDR; 4K@30fps, 1080p@30/60fps
- Front camera: 13 MP, f/2.2, 26mm (wide); 4K@30fps, 1080p@30fps
- Display: 6.6 in (170 mm), Super AMOLED display 1080 x 2340 resolution, 19.5:9 ratio (~390 ppi density); 120Hz refresh rate Corning Gorilla Glass Victus Plus
- Sound: Stereo Speakers
- Connectivity: Wi-Fi 802.11 a/b/g/n/ac, dual-band, Wi-Fi Direct, hotspot Bluetooth 5.3, A2DP, LE
- Data inputs: USB Type-C 2.0; Fingerprint scanner (side-mounted); Accelerometer; Gyroscope; Proximity sensor; Compass
- Website: Galaxy M35 5G

The Samsung Galaxy M35 5G is a mid-range Android-based smartphone manufactured, developed and marketed by Samsung Electronics as a part of its Galaxy M series. This phone was announced on May 24, 2024, with general availability from July 17, 2024.

The Galaxy M35 5G is powered by 5nm-based chipset consisting of 8 cores at up to 2.4GHz. It has a vapour cooling chamber, which is the first in its series. It also came equipped with 6.6-inch FHD+ display with 120Hz refresh rate. and a 6000mAh battery with 25W fast charging system. The display has a punch hole design encompassing the front-facing (selfie) camera. Samsung Galaxy M35 5G also does not have IP Rating, which can certifies the device's resistance to dust and water. The device also does not have headphone jack, so, wired earphones needs to be used with an audio jack connector. This aligns with Samsung's broader shift towards a wireless future, mirroring similar moves by Apple and other major players. Samsung Galaxy M35 5G supports microSD cards for expandable storage, up to 1 TB, using its hybrid SIM slot, that means second SIM card cannot be used along with a microSD card simultaneously. Samsung Galaxy M35 supports Bixby virtual assistant.
