= Samsung Galaxy A35 5G =

2024 Android-based smartphone by Samsung

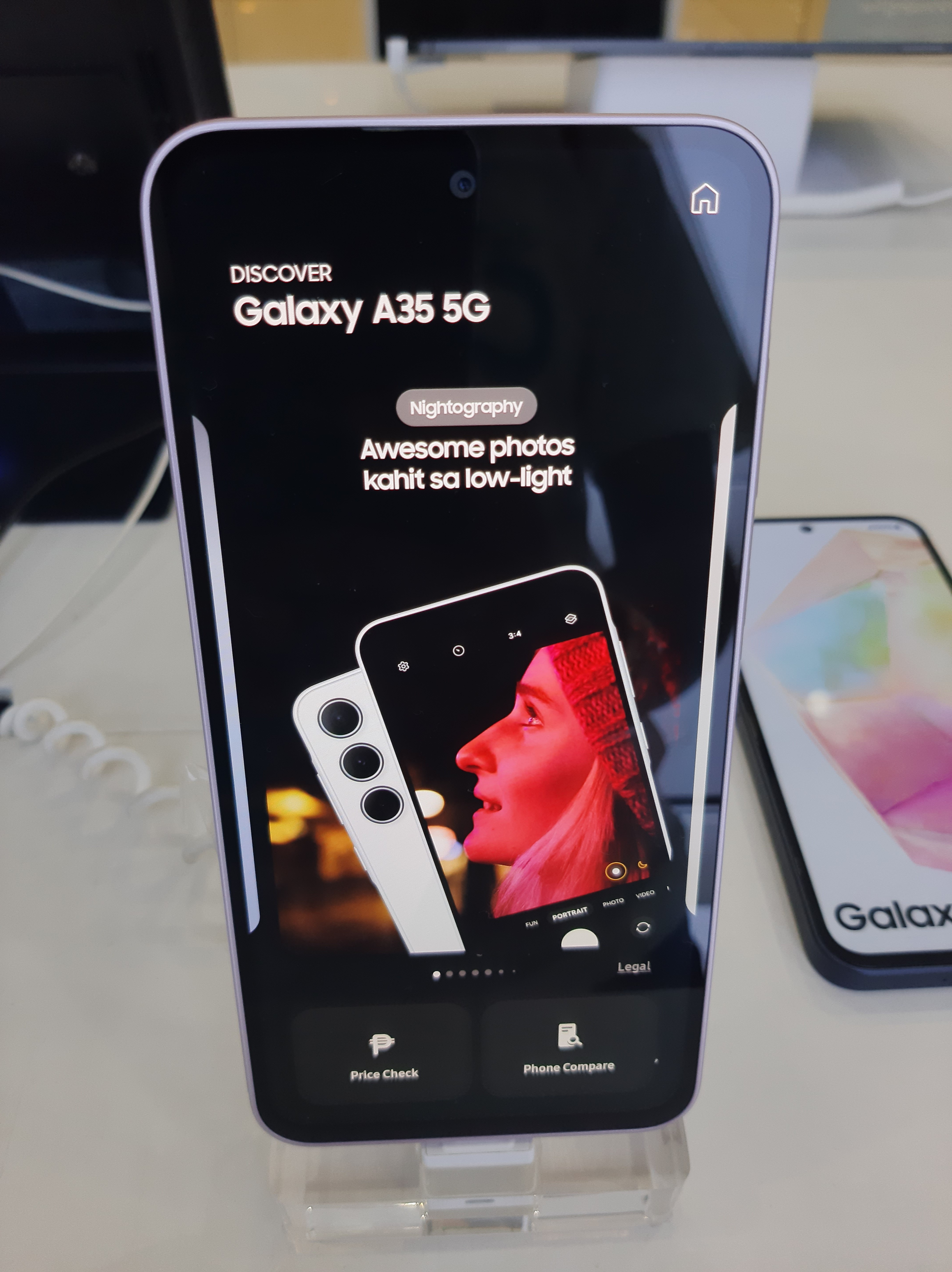
- Samsung Galaxy A35 5G on display at a Samsung store in the Philippines
- Brand: Samsung Galaxy
- Manufacturer: Samsung Electronics
- Type: Smartphone
- Series: Samsung Galaxy A series
- First released: March 15, 2024; 2 years ago
- Discontinued: March 2, 2025; 20 months ago
- Predecessor: Samsung Galaxy A34 5G
- Successor: Samsung Galaxy A36 5G
- Related: Samsung Galaxy A05; Samsung Galaxy A15; Samsung Galaxy A25 5G; Samsung Galaxy A55 5G
- Compatible networks: GSM / HSPA / LTE / 5G
- Form factor: Slate
- Colors: Awesome Iceblue, Awesome Lilac, Awesome Lemon, Awesome Navy.
- Operating system: Original: Android 14 with One UI 6.1; Current: Android 17 with One UI 9.0
- System-on-chip: Exynos 1380 (5 nm)
- CPU: Octa-core (4×2.4 GHz Cortex-A78 & 4×2.0 GHz Cortex-A55)
- GPU: Mali-G68 MP5
- Memory: 6 and 8 GB RAM
- Storage: 128 and 256 GB
- SIM: Nano-SIM and eSIM
- Battery: Li-Ion 5000 mAh
- Charging: Fast charging 25W
- Rear camera: Triple-Camera Setup; Primary: Samsung ISOCELL (S5K)GN8; 50 MP, f/1.8, 25mm, FoV 82°, 1/1.96", 0.8μm, PDAF, OIS; Ultrawide: GalaxyCore GC08A3; 8 MP, f/2.2, 16mm, FoV 108.7°, 1/4.0", 1.12µm; Macro: GalaxyCore GC05A3; 5 MP, f/2.4, 1/5.0", 1.12µm, fixed focus; Camera features: LED flash, panorama, HDR; Video recording: 4K@30fps, 1080p@30/60fps, 720p@480fps; gyro-EIS
- Front camera: Samsung ISOCELL (S5K)3L6; 13 MP, f/2.2, 25mm (wide), FoV 80.6°, 1/3.06", 1.12µm; Video recording: 4K@30fps, 1080p@30/60fps
- Display: 6.6 in (170 mm); 1080 × 2340 px resolution, 19.5:9 ratio (~396 ppi density); Super AMOLED, 120Hz refresh rate
- Sound: Stereo speakers
- Connectivity: Wi-Fi 6 802.11 a/b/g/n/ac/ax, dual-band, Wi-Fi Direct; Bluetooth 5.3, A2DP, LE
- Data inputs: Multi-Touch screen; USB Type-C
- Water resistance: IP67 (up to 1m for 30 min)
- Development status: Discontinued

The Samsung Galaxy A35 5G is a mid-range Android-based smartphone developed and manufactured by Samsung Electronics as a part of its Galaxy A series. It was announced on March 11, 2024 and was released four days later, alongside the Galaxy A55 5G.

== Specifications ==
=== Design ===
The front is made of Corning Gorilla Glass Victus+, while the back uses glass with an unspecified protection. It also features IP67 dust and water resistance. The design of the Galaxy A35 5G is similar to the entire Galaxy Ax5 lineup, featuring a flat (plastic) frame and the Key Island. On the right side, there is the volume rocker and the power button.

Unlike its predecessors, the A35 has a hole punch display like A55 instead of a teardrop notch making it the first in the A3x lineup to have this feature.

Galaxy A35 5G
- Awesome Iceblue
- Awesome Lilac
- Awesome Lemon
- Awesome Navy

=== Hardware ===
==== Display ====
The Galaxy A35 5G features a 6.6-inch Super AMOLED display with a 120Hz refresh rate (same as its predecessor), albeit it now has a punch-hole (Infinity-O) cutout (compared to the teardrop (Infinity-U) notch), a first for the Galaxy A3x lineup.

==== Processor and memory ====
The smartphone is equipped with the in-house Samsung Exynos 1380 SoC, which was first used on the Galaxy A54 5G. It is paired with 6 GB or 8GB of RAM and 128 GB or 256 GB (both with UFS 2.2) of internal storage. It is the last Galaxy A3x model that supports expandable storage via microSD cards.

==== Battery ====
The smartphone features a non-removable Li-Ion 5000 mAh battery with a 25 W fast charging support, similar with its predecessor.

==== Camera ====
It has a triple rear camera setup (with the ultrawide and macro cameras carried over from its predecessor): 50 MP main (a slight upgrade from the 48 MP found on its predecessor), 8 MP ultrawide (f/2.2), and 5 MP macro (f/2.4). The smartphone also features a front-facing 13 MP wide-angle camera. Both main and front cameras can record video in 4K resolution at 30 fps.

| Camera | | Resolution | Aperture | Video recording resolution |
|---|---|---|---|---|
| Rear | Wide (main) | 50 MP (OIS) | f/1.8 | 4K@30fps |
| Rear | Ultra-wide | 8 MP | f/2.2 | 1080p@30fps |
| Rear | Macro | 5 MP | f/2.4 | — |
| Front camera | | 13 MP | f/2.2 | 4K@30fps |

==== Ports and connectivity ====
On the bottom of the smartphone, there is a USB-C 2.0 port, two microphones and stereo speakers. On the top, there is an additional microphone and, depending on the model, either a hybrid dual SIM tray (SIM 1 + SIM 2 or SIM 1 + microSD) or a single SIM tray.

=== Software ===
Alongside the Galaxy A15, Galaxy A25, and the Galaxy A55 5G, the device is slated to receive 4 OS upgrades and 5 years of security updates (until 2029). It also marks the last time these devices will receive this level of support, as its successors all had 6 years of support.

Starting with the Galaxy A35, the Galaxy A3x series no longer supports 32-bit ARMv7 applications due to restrictions in the SoC. Devices that were released prior to the Galaxy A35 continue to support 32-bit apps.

| | Pre-installed OS | OS Upgrades history | | | | End of support |
| | Pre-installed OS | 1st | 2nd | 3rd | 4th | End of support |
|---|---|---|---|---|---|---|
| A35 5G | Android 14 (One UI 6.1) | Android 15 (One UI 7.0); May 2025 | Android 16 (One UI 8.0); September 2025 (One UI 8.5); May 2026' | Android 17 (One UI 9.0); October 2026 | | Expected within 2029 |

| Preceded by Samsung Galaxy A34 5G | Samsung Galaxy A35 5G; 2024 | Succeeded by Samsung Galaxy A36 5G |
