= A34 =

A34 or A-34 may refer to:

== Roads ==
- A34 autoroute (France), connecting Sedan and Reims
- A34 highway (Sri Lanka), connecting Mankulam and Mullaitivu
- A34 road (England), connecting Winchester, Hampshire to Salford
- A34 road (Isle of Man), connecting Ballasalla and the A3
- A34 (Sydney), Australia

== Other uses ==
- Aero A.34, a Czech touring plane of the 1930s
- Brewster A-34 Bermuda, USAAF designation for lend-lease SB2As dive bombers built for the British
- HLA-A34, a human serotype
- Painter of Berlin A 34, a vase painter during the pioneering period of Attic black-figure vase painting
- A-34 Comet (tank), a British tank used in World War II
- English Opening in chess (Encyclopaedia of Chess Openings code A34, among others)
- Samsung Galaxy A34 5G, an Android smartphone by Samsung Electronics
- Athirty4, a pseudonymous British street artist also known as A34
