= List of highways numbered 34B =

The following highways are numbered 34B:

== United States ==
- Nebraska Spur 34B
- New York State Route 34B
- Oklahoma State Highway 34B

== See also ==
- List of highways numbered 34
