= Samsung Galaxy A34 5G =

2023 Android-based smartphone by Samsung

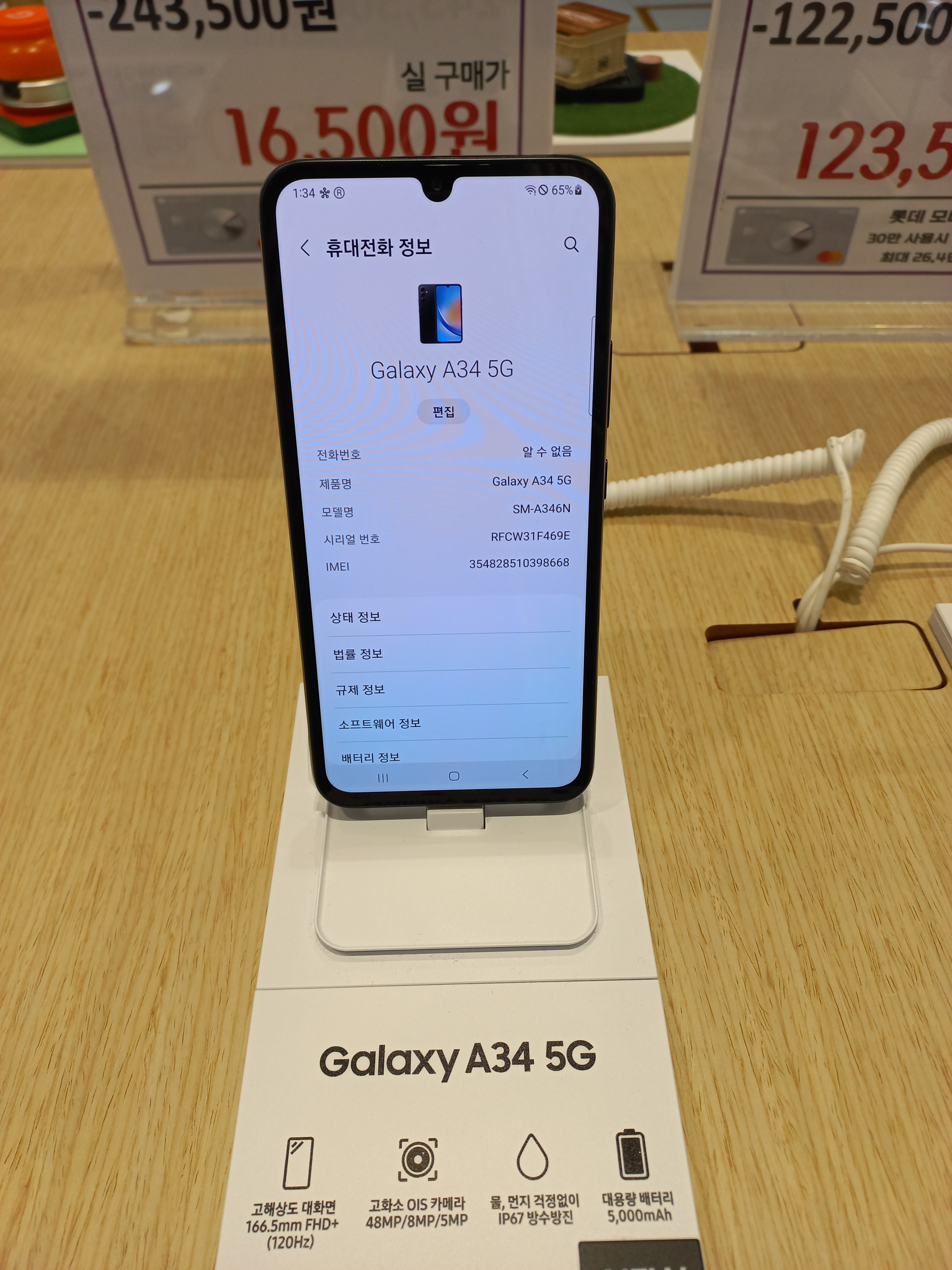
- Front of the Samsung Galaxy A34 5G
- Brand: Samsung Galaxy
- Manufacturer: Samsung Electronics
- Type: Smartphone
- Series: Galaxy A series
- First released: March 24, 2023; 3 years ago
- Availability by region: March 24, 2023; 3 years ago
- Predecessor: Samsung Galaxy A33 5G
- Successor: Samsung Galaxy A35 5G
- Related: Samsung Galaxy A04; Samsung Galaxy A14; Samsung Galaxy A24; Samsung Galaxy A54 5G
- Compatible networks: 2G; 3G; 4G; 5G
- Form factor: Slate
- Colors: Awesome Lime; Awesome Graphite; Awesome Silver; Awesome Violet
- Dimensions: 161.3 mm (6.35 in) H 78.1 mm (3.07 in) W 8.2 mm (0.32 in) D
- Weight: 199 g (7.0 oz)
- Operating system: Original: Android 13 with One UI 5.1; Current: Android 17 with One UI 9.0
- System-on-chip: MediaTek Dimensity 1080 (6 nm)
- CPU: Octa-core (2x2.6 GHz Cortex-A78 & 6x2.0 GHz Cortex-A55)
- GPU: Mali-G68 MC4
- Memory: 6 GB, 8 GB RAM
- Storage: 128 GB, 256 GB
- Removable storage: microSDXC
- SIM: Single SIM (Nano-SIM) or Hybrid Dual SIM (Nano-SIM, dual stand-by)
- Battery: 5000 mAh
- Charging: Fast charging 25W
- Rear camera: Triple-Camera Setup; Primary: Sony IMX 582; 48 MP, f/1.8, 25mm, FoV 81.4°, 1/2.0", 0.8µm, PDAF, OIS; Ultrawide: Samsung S5K4HAYX or Siliconfile SR846D; 8 MP, f/2.2, 16mm, FoV 108.7°, 1/4.0", 1.12µm; Macro: GalaxyCore GC5035; 5 MP, f/2.4, 25mm, 1/5.0", 1.12µm, fixed focus; Camera features: LED flash, panorama, HDR; Video recording: 4K@30fps, 1080p@30/60fps; 720p@480fps
- Front camera: Sony IMX 258; 13 MP, f/2.2, 25mm (wide), FoV 80.9°, 1/3.06", 1.12µm; Video recording: 1080p@30fps; 4K@30fps
- Display: 6.6 in (170 mm); 1080 x 2340 pixels, 19.5:9 ratio (~390 ppi density); Super AMOLED, 120Hz refresh rate Corning Gorilla Glass 5
- Sound: Stereo speakers
- Connectivity: Wi-Fi 802.11 a/b/g/n/ac, dual-band, Wi-Fi Direct, hotspot Bluetooth 5.3, A2DP, LE; A-GPS, GLONASS, GALILEO, BDS, QZSS
- Water resistance: IP67 dust/water resistant (up to 1m for 30 mins)
- Model: SM-A346x (last letter varies by carrier and international models)

The Samsung Galaxy A34 5G is a mid-range Android-based smartphone developed and manufactured by Samsung Electronics as part of its Galaxy A series. The device was announced alongside the Galaxy A54 5G on March 15, 2023.

== Specifications ==
=== Design ===
The front has Gorilla Glass 5 protection, while the back and sides are of plastic material. The Galaxy A34 5G is protected against moisture and dust according to the IP67 standard.

Galaxy A34 5G
- Awesome Violet
- Awesome Silver
- Awesome Lime
- Awesome Graphite

=== Hardware ===
==== Display ====
The device has a 6.6-inch Super AMOLED Infinity-U display with a 120Hz refresh rate. Compared to the A33 5G, it features a 0.2-inch smaller display screen at 6.4 inches, but with an aspect ratio similar to that of the Galaxy A50.

==== Battery ====
It is equipped with a 5000 mAh battery and 25W Fast Charging, like its predecessor.

==== Processor and memory ====
The Galaxy A34 5G is powered by the MediaTek Dimensity 1080 chipset. It is paired with 6 GB or 8 GB of RAM and 128 GB or 256 GB of internal storage (both with UFS 2.2). It has expandable storage up to 1 TB.

==== Camera ====
The device features a triple rear camera setup, with the depth sensor removed from this generation. It has a 48 MP main with OIS, 8 MP ultrawide, and 5 MP macro. The front camera maintains a 13 MP sensor. Like its predecessor, It can record videos up to 4K@30fps at both rear and front.

| Camera | | Resolution | Aperture | Video recording resolution |
|---|---|---|---|---|
| Rear | Wide (main) | 48 MP (OIS) | f/1.8 | 4K@30fps |
| Rear | Ultra-wide | 8 MP | f/2.2 | 1080p@30fps |
| Rear | Macro | 5 MP | f/2.4 | — |
| Front camera | | 13 MP | f/2.2 | 4K@30fps |

==== Ports and connectivity ====
The phone uses USB-C; much like other recent phones. There are two microphones; the first is between the speaker and the charging port, and the second microphone is located on the top. Depending on the version, the phone features a slot for 1 SIM card and a microSD memory card up to 1 TB or a hybrid slot for 2 SIM cards. On the right side are the volume buttons and the power button.

=== Software ===
The device comes with Android 13 and One UI 5.1 pre-installed, and like its predecessor, supports 4 OS upgrades and 5 years of security updates (support ending within 2028). Alongside the Galaxy A05, A14, A24 and A54 5G, it is the last Galaxy A series device to support 32-bit applications.

| | Pre-installed OS | OS Upgrades history | | | | End of support |
| | Pre-installed OS | 1st | 2nd | 3rd | 4th | End of support |
|---|---|---|---|---|---|---|
| A34 5G | Android 13 (One UI 5.1) | Android 14 (One UI 6.0); November 2023 (One UI 6.1); May 2024 | Android 15 (One UI 7.0); June 2025 | Android 16 (One UI 8.0); October 2025 (One UI 8.5); June 2026 | Android 17 (One UI 9.0); November 2026 | Expected within 2028 |
