= Samsung Galaxy A14 =

2023 Android smartphone by Samsung

Samsung Galaxy A14 Samsung Galaxy A14 5G
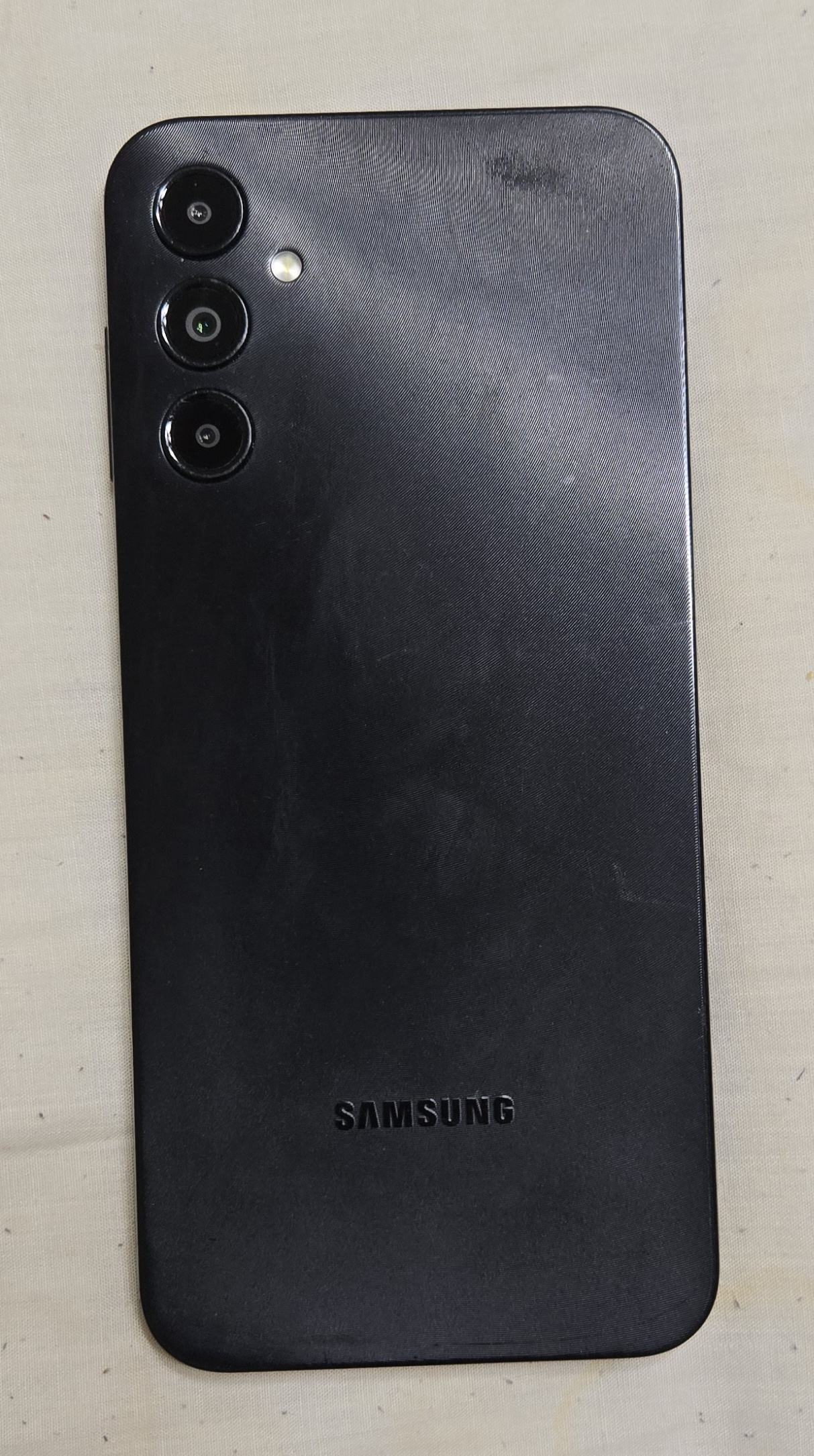
- The back of the Galaxy A14 5G
- Brand: Samsung Galaxy
- Manufacturer: Samsung Electronics
- Type: Smartphone
- Series: Samsung Galaxy A series
- First released: A14: March 27, 2023; 3 years ago; A14 5G: January 12, 2023; 3 years ago
- Predecessor: Samsung Galaxy A13
- Successor: Samsung Galaxy A15
- Related: Samsung Galaxy A04; Samsung Galaxy A24; Samsung Galaxy A34 5G; Samsung Galaxy A54 5G
- Compatible networks: A14: GSM / HSPA / LTE; A14 5G: GSM / HSPA / LTE / 5G
- Form factor: Slate
- Colors: Black, Light Green, Dark Red, Silver
- Dimensions: 167.7 mm (6.60 in) H 78 mm (3.1 in) W 9.1 mm (0.36 in) D
- Weight: A14: 201 g (7.1 oz); A14 5G: 202 g (7.1 oz)
- Operating system: Original: Android 13 with One UI Core 5.0; Current: Android 15 with One UI 7
- System-on-chip: A14: Mediatek MT6769 Helio G80 (12 nm) (Europe & Middle East) or Exynos 850 (8 nm) (America & Asia); A14 5G(SM-A146P): Mediatek MT6833 Dimensity 700 (7 nm); A14 5G(SM-A146B):Exynos 1330 (5 nm)
- CPU: A14: Octa-core (2x2.0 GHz Cortex-A75 & 6x1.8 GHz Cortex-A55); A14 5G: (2x2.2 GHz Cortex-A76 & 6x2.0 GHz Cortex-A55)
- GPU: A14: Mali-G52 MC2; A14 5G(SM-A146P) Mali-G57 MC2; A14 5G(SM-A146B) Mali-G68 MP2
- Memory: 4 and 6 GB RAM
- Storage: 64 and 128 GB
- Removable storage: microSDXC
- SIM: Nano-SIM
- Battery: Li-Po 5000 mAh
- Charging: 15W Adaptive Fast Charging
- Rear camera: Triple-Camera Setup; A14: Primary: Samsung ISOCELL (S5K)JN1; 50 MP, f/1.8, 26mm, FoV 78.8°, 1/2.76", 0.64 µm, PDAF; Ultrawide: Hynix Hi-556; 5 MP, f/2.2, 17mm, FoV 102°, 1/5.0", 1.12 µm, FF; Macro: 2 MP, f/2.4, 1/5.0", 1.75 µm, FF; A14 5G: Primary: Samsung ISOCELL (S5K)JN1; 50 MP, f/1.8, 26mm, FoV 78.8°, 1/2.76", 0.64 µm, PDAF; Macro: GalaxyCore GC02M1; 2 MP, f/2.4, 1/5.0", 1.75 µm, FF; Depth: GalaxyCore GC02M1B; 2 MP, f/2.4, 1/5.0", 1.75 µm; Camera features: LED flash, panorama, HDR; Video recording: 1080p@30fps, 720p@30fps
- Front camera: Hynix Hi-1336; 13 MP, f/2.0, 27mm (wide), FoV 78.1°, 1/3.06", 1.12µm, FF; Video recording: 1080p@30fps, 720p@30fps
- Display: A14: 6.6 in (170 mm) 1080 x 2408 px resolution, 20:9 ratio (~400 ppi density) PLS LCD, 60 Hz refresh rate; A14 5G: 6.6 in (170 mm) 1080 x 2408 px resolution, 20:9 ratio (~400 ppi density) PLS LCD, 90 Hz refresh rate
- Sound: Mono speaker, 3.5 mm auxiliary (headphone jack)
- Connectivity: Wi-Fi 802.11 a/b/g/n/ac, dual-band, Wi-Fi Direct; Bluetooth 5.2, A2DP, LE
- Data inputs: Fingerprint scanner (side-mounted); Accelerometer; Gyroscope; Compass; Barometer; NFC
- Water resistance: None
- Model: (A14 5G) SM-A146B, SM-A146B/DS, SM-A146P, SM-A146P/DS, SM-A146U, SM-A146U1, SM-A146U1/DS, SM-A146W, SM-A146P/N, SM-A146P/DSN, SM-S146VL, SM-A146M, (A14 LTE) SM-A145F, SM-A145F/DSN, SM-A145M, SM-A145M/DS, SM-A145P, SM-A145R
- Website: www.samsung.com/my/smartphones/galaxy-a/galaxy-a14-silver-128gb-sm-a145fzswxme/; www.samsungmobilepress.com/media-assets/galaxy-a14-5g

The Samsung Galaxy A14 is an Android-based smartphone designed and manufactured by Samsung Electronics. The 5G model was announced on January 4, 2023, and the 4G LTE model was announced on February 28, 2023. The devices also marked several as last, such as the use of an LCD panel display, eMMC storage, 15W Fast Charging only, and short software support, as its successor began introducing several upgrades.

== Specifications ==
=== Design ===
Similar to its predecessor, the back and sides are made of plastic, and the front uses glass with an unspecified protection. While both models have a plastic back cover, they feature distinctive patterns to differentiate them: the LTE model has a stripes pattern, while the 5G model has a ripple pattern.

Galaxy A14 LTE	Galaxy A14 5G
Dark Red; Silver; Light Green; Black

=== Hardware ===
==== Display ====
Both models come with a 6.6-inch (170 mm) PLS LCD FHD display (1080 x 2408). This device would be the last Galaxy A1x model to have an LCD panel, as its successors use an AMOLED display.

The LTE model comes in a basic 60 Hz refresh rate screen, while the 5G model screen comes with a 90 Hz refresh rate screen.

==== Battery ====
Both phones come with the same 5000 mAh non-removable Li-Po battery, that supports fast charging of 15 W (Wired USB-C).

==== Processor and memory ====
The devices use different chipsets and also vary by country: the LTE model either used the Samsung Exynos 850 (8 nm) or the MediaTek MT6769 Helio G80 (12 nm) chipset, while the 5G model either used the Exynos 1330 (5 nm) or the MediaTek Dimensity 700 (7 nm) chipset.

Both models offer multiple RAM and storage options, ranging from 4 GB to 8 GB of RAM and 64 GB to 128 GB of internal storage. The LTE model uses the eMMC storage (which also marks the last A1x model to do so), while the 5G model now uses the UFS 2.2 storage, a first for the overall A1x series.

Both phones come with expandable storage, the LTE and 5G international models using a dedicated microSDXC card slot, and the 5G USA's microSDXC using a sharedSIM slot.

==== Camera ====
Both models include a triple camera rear setup, although include different cameras. They both come with the same 50 MP f/1.8 (wide-angle) main camera with phase detection autofocus (PDAF), and a 2 MP f/2.4 (macro) camera. The 4G model comes with a 5 MP f/2.2 Ultrawide, while the 5G model includes a 2 MP f/2.4 depth lens. Both models use the same 13 MP f/2.0 selfie camera that is capable of 1080@30 fps video.

==== Ports and connectivity ====
Both phones come with a 3.5 mm headphone jack, NFC, Bluetooth 5.1 side-mounted fingerprint scanner, GPS, accelerometer, proximity sensor, and compass. The 5G model also comes with a Bluetooth 5.2 gyro sensor, barometer (USA only), and FM Radio (Exynos 1330 only).

=== Software ===
Both phones were released with One UI Core 5 on top of Android 13. They are slated to have two OS updates and 4 years of security updates (until 2027). It also marks the last time these devices will receive this limited support, as later Galaxy A1x models would have an extended support.

	Pre-installed OS	OS Upgrades history		End of support
	Pre-installed OS	1st	2nd	End of support
A14 LTE	Android 13 (One UI Core 5)	Android 14 (One UI 6.0); December 2023	Android 15 (One UI 7.0); July 2025	Expected within 2027
A14 5G	Android 13 (One UI Core 5) Minor One UI update: (One UI Core 5.1); March 2023	Android 14 (One UI 6.0); November 2023	Android 15 (One UI 7.0); June 2025	Expected within 2027

Preceded by Samsung Galaxy A13	Samsung Galaxy A14 / A14 5G; 2023	Succeeded by Samsung Galaxy A15
