= Karavoma =

Karavoma Καράβωμα
- Settlement
- Location within Greece
- Coordinates: 39°25′9.2″N 23°6′1.1″E
- Country: Greece
- Administrative region: Thessaly
- Regional unit: Magnesia
- Municipality: Zagora-Mouresi
- Municipal unit: Zagora
- Elevation: 586 m (1,923 ft)

Population (2021)
  - Total: 3
- Time zone: UTC+2 (EET)
  - Summer (DST): UTC+3 (EEST)
- Postal code: 370 01
- Area code: 2426

Karavoma (Greek: Καράβωμα) is a small hamlet in Magnesia, Thessaly, Greece. The hamlet is located on the eastern slopes of the Pelion mountain, about 38 kilometres (24 miles) east-north east of Volos. Despite having a population of only three residents according to the 2021 census, Karavoma is an intersection for Greek national roads EO34 and EO34a, both of which run between Volos to Chorefto.

== Geography ==
Karavoma is a mountain hamlet, built on the eastern slopes of Pelion at an altitude of 586 meters above sea level. It is located about 38 kilometres (24 miles) east-north east of the city of Volos, and 5 km (3.1 mi) south of Zagora, the seat of the Zagora-Mouresi municipality.

Karavoma was officially mentioned as a separate settlement in 1991, as part of the community of Makrirrachi in the Zagora municipality. Due to the local government reform of the Kallikratis Programme in 2011, the community of Makrirrachi (which consists of Agioi Saranta, Karavoma, and Makrirrachi) became part of the Zagora municipal unit of the Zagora-Mouresi municipality.

== Demographics ==
According to the 2011 census, Karavoma had nine permanent residents. In the 2021 census, the population of the hamlet fell to three residents.

== Transportation ==
Greek national roads EO34 and EO34a meet at Karavoma after following separate alignments around the Pelion peninsula from Volos, before proceeding north-north east towards Zagora and Chorefto.
