= Samsung Galaxy A15 =

2023 Android-based smartphones manufactured by Samsung

Samsung Galaxy A15 Samsung Galaxy A15 5G
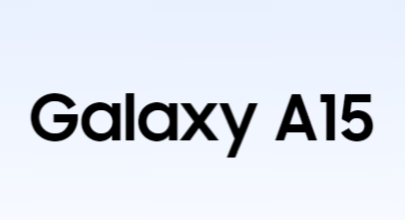

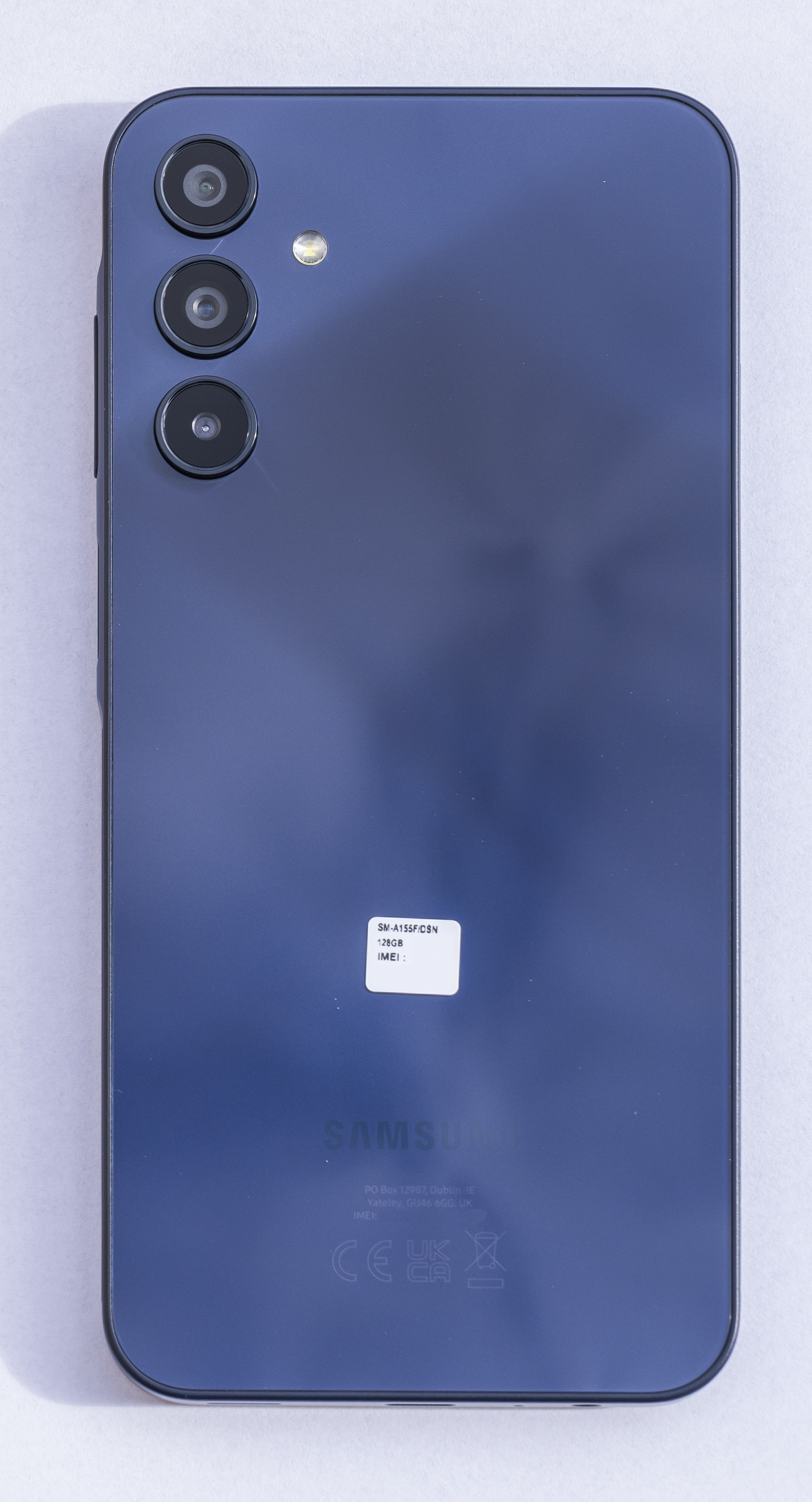
- Also sold as: Galaxy M15 5G; Galaxy F15 5G; Galaxy Buddy 3 (South Korea); Galaxy Wide 7 (South Korea)
- Brand: Samsung Galaxy
- Manufacturer: Samsung Electronics
- Type: Smartphone
- Series: Samsung Galaxy A series
- First released: 16 December 2023; 2 years ago
- Predecessor: Samsung Galaxy A14
- Successor: Samsung Galaxy A16
- Related: Samsung Galaxy A05; Samsung Galaxy A25 5G; Samsung Galaxy A35 5G; Samsung Galaxy A55 5G
- Compatible networks: A15: 2G / 3G / 4G LTE; A15 5G: 2G / 3G / 4G LTE / 5G NR
- Form factor: Slate
- Dimensions: 160.1 mm (6.30 in) H 76.8 mm (3.02 in) W 8.4 mm (0.33 in) D
- Weight: 200 g (7.1 oz)
- Operating system: Original: Android 14 with One UI 6.0; Current: Android 17 with One UI 9.0
- System-on-chip: A15: Mediatek Helio G99 (6nm); A15 5G: Mediatek Dimensity 6100+ (6 nm)
- CPU: Octa-core (2x2.2 GHz Cortex-A76 & 6x2.0 GHz Cortex-A55)
- GPU: Mali-G57 MC2
- Memory: 4, 6, 8 GB
- Storage: 64, 128, 256 GB UFS 2.2
- Removable storage: Micro SD up to 1 TB
- SIM: Nano-SIM
- Battery: 5000mAh
- Charging: 25W Super Fast Charging
- Rear camera: Triple-Camera Setup; Primary: Hynix Hi5022Q; 50 MP, f/1.8, 26mm, FoV 78.7°, 1/2.8", 0.64μm, AF; Pixel binning; Ultrawide: SmartSense SC501CS; 5 MP, f/2.2, 17mm, FoV 104.3°, 1/5.0", 1.12μm; Macro: GalaxyCore GC02M1; 2 MP, f/2.4, 1/5.0", 1.75μm, fixed focus; Camera features: LED flash, panorama, HDR; Video recording: 1080p@30fps, 720p@30fps
- Front camera: GalaxyCore GC13A0; 13 MP, f/2.0, 27mm (wide), FoV 78.1°, 1/3.06", 1.12μm; Video recording: 1080p@30fps
- Display: 6.5 in (170 mm); 1080 x 2340 px resolution, 19.5:9 ratio (~396 ppi density); Super AMOLED, 90Hz, 800 nits (HBM)
- Sound: Loudspeaker (Mono Speaker)
- Connectivity: Wi-Fi 802.11 a/b/g/n/ac, dual-band, Wi-Fi Direct; Bluetooth 5.3, A2DP, LE
- Data inputs: Multi-touch screen; USB Type-C 2.0; Fingerprint scanner; Accelerometer; Gyroscope; Compass

The Samsung Galaxy A15 and Samsung Galaxy A15 5G are Android-based smartphones designed, developed and marketed by Samsung Electronics as a part of its Galaxy A series. They were announced on December 11, 2023, and released on December 16, less than a week later.

There were also rebranded versions of the device: the Galaxy M15 5G (announced on March 9, 2024), the Galaxy F15 5G (announced on March 4, 2024), the Galaxy Buddy 3 (announced on April 26, 2024), and the Galaxy Wide 7 (announced on June 26, 2024), with the latter two devices exclusively sold for South Korea.

== Specifications ==
=== Design ===
Similar to its predecessor, both devices feature plastic frame and back (with the LTE version using a glossy back, while the 5G version using a matte back), alongside the Key Island Design

Galaxy A15 LTE Galaxy A15 5G Galaxy Buddy 3	Galaxy M15 5G Galaxy Wide 7	Galaxy F15 5G
Light Blue; Blue; Blue Black; Yellow	Dark Blue; Light Blue; Gray	Black; Light Green; Light Violet

=== Hardware ===
==== Display ====
It has a 6.5 inch diagonal notched display (slightly smaller than its predecessor), albeit it now uses a Super AMOLED display type, a first for the A1x series.

Alongside the new SuperAMOLED display, it also had a resolution of 1080 × 2340 pixels, with a maximum refresh rate of 90 Hz.

==== Battery ====
The A15 (LTE/5G) are equipped with a 5000 mAh battery (the same as its predecessor), while the M15 and F15 feature a 6000mAh battery (also the same as its predecessor).

Despite the unchanged battery capacity, it now brings a faster 25W Fast Charging (a first for the Galaxy A1x series), an upgrade from the 15 watts from its predecessor.

==== Processor and memory ====
The LTE model uses the MediaTek Helio G99 chipset, while the 5G versions uses the MediaTek Dimensity 6100+.

For both devices, RAM configurations range from 4 to 8 GB, while storage options are available in either 128 or 256 GB, with expandable storage up to 1 TB. A 64 GB option for the 5G variant is also available, albeit exclusive only for the North American version of the device.

For the first time in the Galaxy A1x series, this iteration now have a UFS 2.2 internal storage type for both the LTE and 5G variants. Prior to this release, its predecessor had an eMMC 5.1 internal storage for the LTE model and UFS 2.2 for the 5G model.

==== Camera ====
All models features a rear triple-camera setup: 50 MP main, 5 MP ultrawide (a first for the Galaxy A1x 5G models), 2 MP macro. Its front camera has a 13 MP sensor. It can record videos up to 1080p at 30fps at both rear and front.

Camera		Resolution	Aperture	Video recording resolution
Rear	Wide (main)	50 MP	f/1.8	1080p@30fps
Rear	Ultra-wide	5 MP	f/2.2	1080p@30fps
Rear	Macro	2 MP	f/2.4	—
Front camera		13 MP	f/2.0	1080p@30fps

=== Software ===
Alongside the Galaxy A25, Galaxy A35, and the Galaxy A55 5G, the device is slated to receive 4 OS upgrades and 5 years of security updates (expected within 2028). While these devices became the first in the Galaxy A1x series to have extended support, it also marks the last time these devices will receive this level of support, as its successors all had 6 years of support.

	Pre-installed OS	OS Upgrades history				End of support
	Pre-installed OS	1st	2nd	3rd	4th	End of support
A15 LTE	Android 14 (One UI 6.0)	Android 15 (One UI 7.0); May 2025	Android 16 (One UI 8.0); November 2025 (One UI 8.5); June 2026	Android 17 (One UI 9.0); November 2026		Expected within 2028
A15 5G; Galaxy Buddy 3	Android 14 (One UI 6.0)	Android 15 (One UI 7.0); May 2025	Android 16 (One UI 8.0); October 2025 (One UI 8.5); June 2026	Android 17 (One UI 9.0); October 2026		Expected within 2028
M15 5G; Galaxy Wide 7	Android 14 (One UI 6.0)	Android 15 (One UI 7.0); May 2025	Android 16 (One UI 8.0); October 2025 (One UI 8.5); June 2026			Expected within 2028
F15 5G	Android 14 (One UI 6.0)	Android 15 (One UI 7.0); June 2025	Android 16 (One UI 8.0); October 2025 (One UI 8.5); June 2026			Expected within 2028

Preceded by Samsung Galaxy A14 / A14 5G	Samsung Galaxy A15 / A15 5G; 2023	Succeeded by Samsung Galaxy A16 / A16 5G
