= Samsung Galaxy A24 =

2023 Android-based smartphone manufactured by Samsung

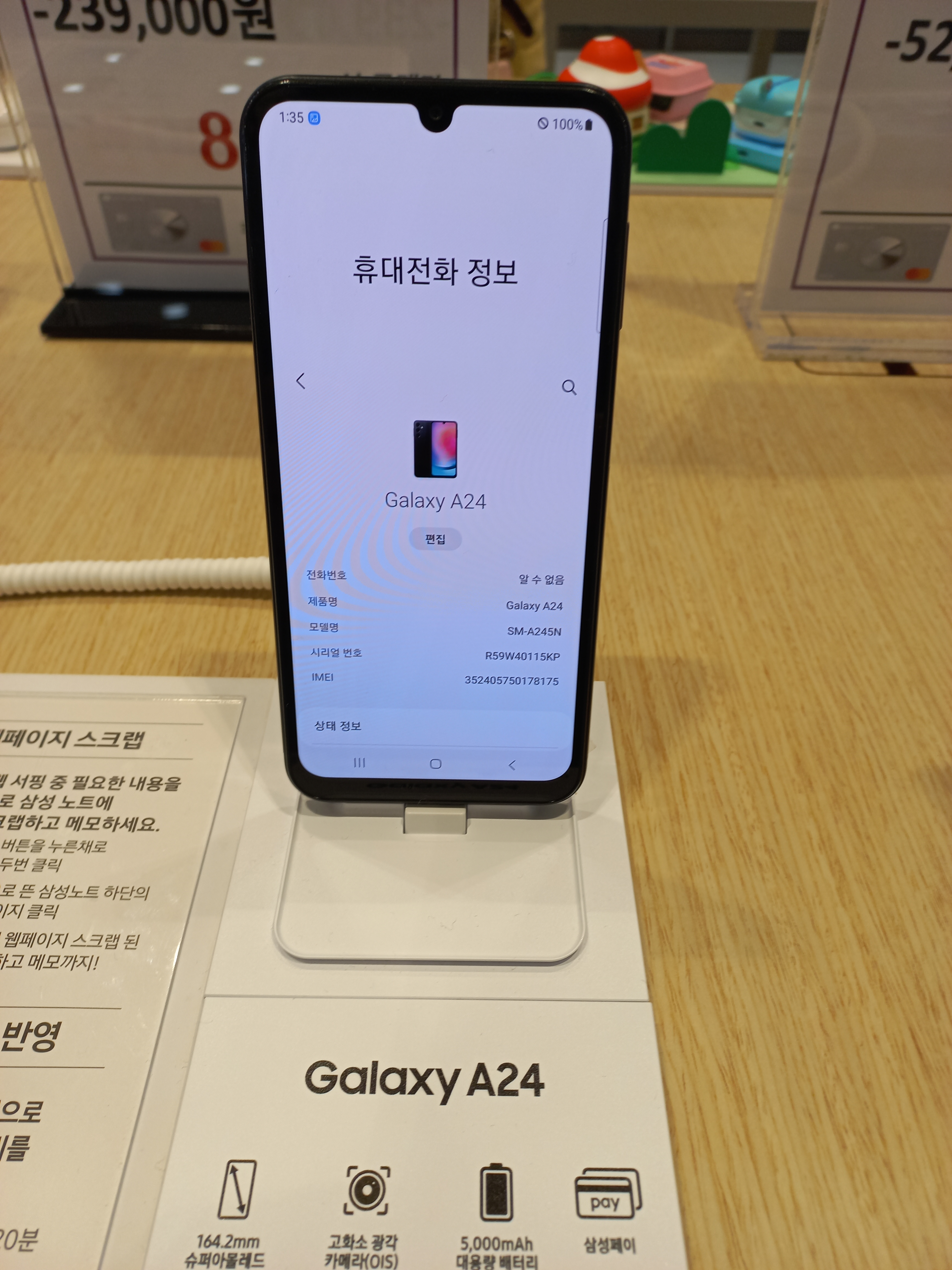
- Samsung Galaxy A24 on display in South Korea
- Brand: Samsung Galaxy
- Manufacturer: Samsung Electronics
- Type: Phone
- Series: Galaxy A series
- First released: April 29, 2023; 3 years ago
- Predecessor: Samsung Galaxy A23
- Successor: Samsung Galaxy A25 5G
- Related: Samsung Galaxy A04; Samsung Galaxy A14; Samsung Galaxy A34 5G; Samsung Galaxy A54 5G
- Compatible networks: GSM / HSPA / LTE
- Form factor: Slate
- Colors: Black, White, Peach, Blue
- Dimensions: 165.4 mm (6.51 in) H 76.9 mm (3.03 in) W 8.4 mm (0.33 in) D
- Weight: 195 g (6.9 oz)
- Operating system: Original: Android 13 with One UI 5.1; Current: Android 17 with One UI 9.0
- System-on-chip: MediaTek MT8781 Helio G99 (6nm)
- CPU: Octa-core (2x2.2 GHz Cortex-A76 & 6x2.0 GHz Cortex-A55)
- GPU: Mali-G57 MC2
- Memory: 4 GB, 6 GB, 8 GB RAM
- Storage: 128 GB
- Removable storage: microSDXC
- SIM: Single SIM (Nano-SIM) or Dual SIM (Nano-SIM, dual stand-by)
- Battery: 5000 mAh
- Charging: Fast charging 25W
- Rear camera: Triple-Camera Setup; Primary: Samsung ISOCELL (S5K)JN1; 50 MP, f/1.8, 27mm, FoV 78.4°, 1/2.76", 0.64μm, PDAF, OIS; Ultrawide: GalaxyCore GC5035; 5 MP, f/2.2, 17mm, FoV 104.3°, 1/5.0", 1.12μm; Macro: GalaxyCore GC02M1; 2 MP, f/2.4, 1/5.0", 1.75μm, fixed focus; Camera features: LED flash, panorama, HDR; Video recording: 1080p@30fps, gyro-EIS
- Front camera: Sony IMX 258 or Hynix Hi-1339; 13 MP, f/2.2, 25mm (wide), FoV 80.9°, 1/3.06", 1.12μm; Video recording: 1080p@30fps
- Display: 6.5 in (170 mm), Infinity-U Display; 1080 x 2408 px resolution, 20:9 ratio (~406 ppi density); Super AMOLED, 90Hz refresh rate
- Sound: 3.5mm jack
- Connectivity: Wi-Fi 802.11 a/b/g/n/ac, dual-band, Wi-Fi Direct, hotspot Bluetooth 5.3, A2DP, LE; A-GPS, GLONASS, GALILEO, BDS
- Data inputs: Multi-touch screen; USB Type-C 2.0; Fingerprint scanner (side-mounted); Accelerometer; Gyroscope; Compass
- Website: www.samsung.com/vn/smartphones/galaxy-a/galaxy-a24-black-128gb-sm-a245fzkwxxv/

The Samsung Galaxy A24 is an Android-based smartphone designed, developed and marketed by Samsung Electronics as a part of its Galaxy A series. This phone was announced on April 19, 2023.

Unlike its predecessor, there was no 5G version of this device. It also marks the last A2x device that only has LTE support, as its successor is available only in a 5G version.

== Specifications ==
=== Design ===
The front has glass with an unspecified protection, while the back and sides are of plastic material.

Galaxy A24
- Dark Red
- Silver
- Light Green
- Black

=== Hardware ===
==== Display ====
The device has a 6.5-inch Super AMOLED display with a 90Hz refresh rate. Compared to the A23 LTE/5G, it features a 0.1-inch smaller display screen at 6.6 inches, but with an aspect ratio similar to that of the Galaxy A50.

==== Battery ====
It is equipped with a 5000 mAh battery and 25W Fast Charging, like its predecessor.

==== Processor and memory ====
The Galaxy A24 is powered by the MediaTek Helio G99 chipset. It is paired with 4 to 8 GB of RAM and a sole 128 GB internal storage option (UFS 2.2). It has expandable storage up to 1 TB.

==== Camera ====
The device now features a triple rear camera setup, with the depth sensor already removed from this generation. It has a 50 MP main with OIS, 5 MP ultrawide, and 2 MP macro. The front camera now has 13 MP sensor. Like its predecessor, It can record videos up to 1080p@30fps at both rear and front.

=== Software ===
The device comes with Android 13 and One UI 5.1 pre-installed, and unlike its predecessor, this device supports 4 OS upgrades and 5 years of security updates (until 2028).

	Pre-installed OS	OS Upgrades history				End of support
	Pre-installed OS	1st	2nd	3rd	4th	End of support
A24	Android 13 (One UI 5.1)	Android 14 (One UI 6.0); November 2023 (One UI 6.1); June 2024	Android 15 (One UI 7.0); June 2025	Android 16 (One UI 8.0); November 2025 (One UI 8.5); June 2026	Android 17 (One UI 9.0); November 2026	Expected within 2028
