= Pixel binning =

Combining pixels in groups in digital image processing

Pixel binning, also known as binning, is a process image sensors of digital cameras use to combine adjacent pixels throughout an image, by summing or averaging their values, during or after readout. It improves low-light performance while still allowing for highly detailed photographs in good light.

Charge from adjacent pixels in CCD or charge-coupled device image sensors and some other image sensors can be combined during readout, increasing the line rate or frame rate.

In the context of image processing, binning is the procedure of combining clusters of adjacent pixels, throughout an image, into single pixels. For example, in 2×2 binning, an array of 4 pixels becomes a single larger pixel, reducing the number of pixels to 1/4 and halving the image resolution in each dimension. The result can be the sum, average, median, minimum, or maximum value of the cluster. Some systems use more advanced algorithms such as considering the values of nearby pixels, edge detection, self-claimed "AI", etc. to increase the perceived visual quality of the final downsized image.

This aggregation, although associated with loss of information, reduces the amount of data to be processed, facilitating analysis. The binned image has lower resolution, but the relative noise level in each pixel is generally reduced.

== History ==
Normally, an increase in megapixel count on a constant image sensor size would lead to a sacrifice of the surface size of the individual pixels, which would result in each pixel being able to catch less light in the same time, thus leading to a darker and/or noisier image in low light (given the same exposure time).

In the past, camera manufacturers had to compromise between low-light performance and the amount of detail in good light, by dropping the megapixel count like HTC did in 2013 with their four-megapixel "UltraPixel" camera. However, this results in less detailed images in daylight where enough light is available.

With pixel binning, the camera has "the best of both worlds", meaning both the benefit of high detail in good light and the benefit of high brightness in low light. In low light, the surfaces of four or more pixels can act as one large pixel that catches far more light. For example, some smartphones such as the Samsung Galaxy A15 are able to capture photographs with up to fifty megapixels in daylight. However, in low light, the individual pixels would be too small to capture the light needed for a bright image with the short exposure time available for handheld shooting. Therefore, with pixel binning activated, the 50-megapixel image sensor acts as a 12.5-megapixel image sensor, a quarter of its original resolution, with an accordingly larger surface area per pixel.

== Implementations ==
Nona-binning merges groups of nine pixels arranged in a 3×3 pattern. Nona-binning is most commonly implemented in sensors with a resolution of 108 megapixels and higher.

== See also ==
- Downsampling (signal processing)
- Image scaling
