= List of N34 roads =

This is a list of roads designated N34. Roads entries are sorted in the countries alphabetical order.

- N34 road (Belgium), a road connecting Knokke and with De Panne
- N34 road (France), a road connecting Vincennes, Coulommiers and Esternay
- N34 road (Luxembourg)
- N34 road (Negeri Sembilan), a road connecting Semenyih and Mantin in Malaysia
- Provincial road N34 (Netherlands), a road connecting De Punt to Ommen in the Netherlands

== See also ==
- List of highways numbered 34
