= Samsung Galaxy A54 5G =

2023 Android-based smartphone by Samsung

Samsung Galaxy A54 5G Samsung Galaxy Quantum4
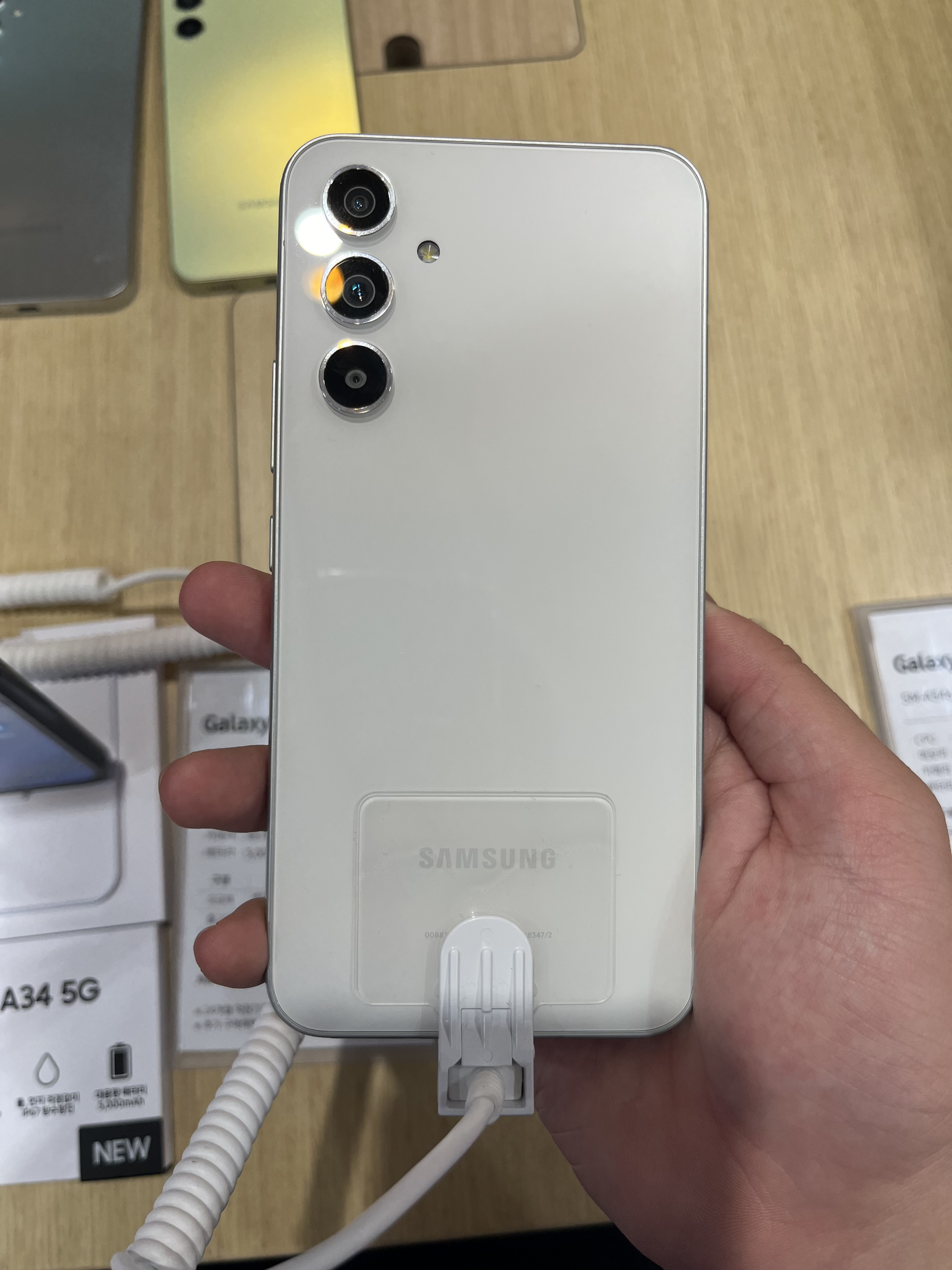
- Back of the Samsung Galaxy A54 5G
- Brand: Samsung Galaxy
- Manufacturer: Samsung Electronics
- Type: Smartphone
- Series: Galaxy A series
- First released: March 24, 2023; 3 years ago
- Predecessor: Samsung Galaxy A53 5G; Samsung Galaxy A73 5G
- Successor: Samsung Galaxy A55 5G; Samsung Galaxy A35 5G (US only)
- Related: Samsung Galaxy A14; Samsung Galaxy A24; Samsung Galaxy A34 5G
- Compatible networks: GSM / HSPA / LTE / 5G NR
- Form factor: Slate
- Colors: Lime, Graphite, Violet, White
- Dimensions: 158.2 mm (6.23 in) H 76.7 mm (3.02 in) W 8.2 mm (0.32 in) D
- Weight: 202 g (7.1 oz)
- Operating system: Original: Android 13 with One UI 5.1; Current: Android 17 with One UI 9.0
- System-on-chip: Exynos 1380 (5 nm)
- CPU: Octa-core (4x2.4 GHz Cortex-A78 & 4x2.0 GHz Cortex-A55)
- GPU: Mali-G68 MP5
- Memory: 6 GB, 8 GB RAM
- Storage: 128 GB, 256 GB
- SIM: Dual nano SIM or Nano-SIM and eSIM (varies by carrier and international models)
- Battery: 5000 mAh
- Charging: Fast charging 25W
- Rear camera: Triple-Camera Setup; Primary: Sony IMX 766; 50 MP, f/1.8, 23mm, FoV 85.3°, 1/1.56", 1.0µm, PDAF, OIS; Ultrawide: Samsung S5K3L6; 12 MP, f/2.2, 13mm, FoV 116.3°, 1/3", 1.12µm; Macro: 5 MP, f/2.4, 25mm, 1/5.0", 1.12µm, fixed focus; Camera features: LED flash, panorama, HDR; Video recording: 4K@30fps, 1080p@30/60fps; gyro-EIS
- Front camera: Sony IMX 616; 32 MP, f/2.2, 25mm (wide), FoV 82.5°, 1/2.74", 0.8µm; Camera features: HDR; Video recording: 4K@30fps, 1080p@30/60fps
- Display: 6.4 in (160 mm); Infinity-O display, Super AMOLED, 120Hz refresh rate, 1000 nits (HBM); 1080 x 2340 px resolution, 19.5:9 aspect ratio (~403 ppi density)
- External display: Always on
- Sound: Stereo speakers
- Connectivity: Wi-Fi 6 802.11 a/b/g/n/ac/ax 2.4G-5GHz, dual-band, Wi-Fi Direct, hotspot Bluetooth 5.3, A2DP, LE; A-GPS, GLONASS, Galileo, BeiDou, QZSS
- Data inputs: Multi-touch screen; USB Type-C 2.0; Fingerprint scanner (optical under display); Accelerometer; Gyroscope; Compass
- Water resistance: IP67 dust/water resistant (up to 1m for 30 mins)
- Model: International models: SM-A546x (last letter varies by carrier and international models); Japanese models: SCG21 (au); SC-53D (NTT Docomo)

The Samsung Galaxy A54 5G (sold as the Galaxy Quantum4 in South Korea) is a mid-range Android-based smartphone developed and manufactured by Samsung Electronics as a part of its Galaxy A series. It was first announced on March 15, 2023 and was made available on March 24, 2023.

== Specifications ==
=== Design ===
The front and back are made of Gorilla Glass 5, an upgrade from its predecessor which used a plastic back and a glass front (Corning Gorilla Glass 5). The Galaxy A54 5G is protected against moisture and dust according to the IP67 standard.

Galaxy A54 5G
- Awesome Violet
- Awesome White
- Awesome Lime
- Awesome Graphite

=== Hardware ===
==== Display ====
The device has a 6.4-inch Super AMOLED display with a 120Hz refresh rate. Compared to the A53 5G, it has a 0.1-inch smaller display screen at 6.5-inch, but with an aspect ratio similar to the Galaxy A50.

==== Battery ====
It is equipped with a 5000 mAh battery and 25W Fast Charging, like its predecessors.

==== Processor and memory ====
The Galaxy A54 5G is powered by the Exynos 1380 chipset. It is paired with 6 GB or 8 GB of RAM and 128 GB or 256 GB of internal storage (both with UFS 2.2). It has expandable storage up to 1 TB.

==== Camera ====
The device features a triple rear camera setup, with the depth sensor already removed from this generation. It has a 50 MP main with OIS, 12 MP ultrawide, and 5 MP macro. The front camera maintains a 32 MP sensor. Like its predecessor, It can record videos up to 4K@30fps and 1080p@60fps at both rear and front.

==== Ports and connectivity ====
The Galaxy A54 5G, like its predecessor, the A53 5G, does not have a 3.5 mm audio jack.

At the bottom are a USB-C 2.0 connector, a speaker, and a microphone. A second microphone and speaker are located on the top, alongside a slot for either one SIM card and one microSD card or two SIM cards. On the right side are the volume buttons and the smartphone lock, power and action button.

The Quantum 4 (SM-A546S) version, a localization model released in South Korea, has a built-in quantum random number generator (QRNG) chipset developed by SK Telecom.

=== Software ===
The device comes with Android 13 and One UI 5.1 pre-installed, and like its predecessor, supports 4 OS upgrades and 5 years of security updates (support ending within 2028).

	Pre-installed OS	OS Upgrades history				End of support
	Pre-installed OS	1st	2nd	3rd	4th	End of support
A54 5G	Android 13 (One UI 5.1)	Android 14 (One UI 6.0); November 2023 (One UI 6.1); May 2024	Android 15 (One UI 7.0); May 2025	Android 16 (One UI 8.0); October 2025 (One UI 8.5); June 2026	Android 17 (One UI 9.0); October 2026	Expected within 2028

Preceded by Samsung Galaxy A53 5G	Samsung Galaxy A54 5G; 2023	Succeeded by Samsung Galaxy A55 5G
