= Greek National Road 34a =

Trunk road in Greece

National Road 34a
- Εθνική Οδός 34α
- Route of the EO34a road, in blue

Route information
- Auxiliary route of EO34
- Length: 52.6 km (32.7 mi)
- Existed: 9 July 1963–present

Major junctions
- West end: Volos
- East end: Chorefto

Location
- Country: Greece
- Regions: Thessaly
- Primary destinations: Volos; Portaria; Chorefto

Highway system
- Highways in Greece; Motorways; National roads
← EO34	→ EO35

Greek National Road 34a (Greek: Εθνική Οδός 34α), abbreviated as the EO34a, is a national road in Thessaly, Greece. The EO34a is a direct variant of the EO34, running through the Pelion mountain range from Volos to Chorefto.

== Route ==
The EO34a is officially defined as an east–west coastal road through the Pelion mountain range. From the junction with the EO34 in Central Volos, the road heads east to Chorefto, via Portaria. Between Karavoma and Chorefto, the EO34a overlaps with the EO34, an indirect variant of the EO34a that runs along most of the coast of the Pelion peninsula.

== History ==
Ministerial Decision G25871 of 9 July 1963 created the EO34a from part of the old EO14, which existed by royal decree from 1955 until 1963: the remainder of the old EO14, between Volos and Larissa, became part of the EO6. The road was subclassified as part of the tertiary network in 1995.
