= Greek National Road 34 =

Trunk road in Greece

National Road 34
- Εθνική Οδός 34
- Route of the EO34 road, in blue

Route information
- Length: 88.8 km (55.2 mi)
- Existed: 9 July 1963–present

Major junctions
- West end: Volos
- East end: Chorefto

Location
- Country: Greece
- Regions: Thessaly
- Primary destinations: Volos; Neochori; Tsagkarada; Chorefto

Highway system
- Highways in Greece; Motorways; National roads
← EO33	→ EO34a

Greek National Road 34 (Greek: Εθνική Οδός 34), abbreviated as the EO34, is a national road in Thessaly, Greece. The EO34 runs along the coast of the Pelion peninsula, from Volos to Chorefto via Neochori.

== Route ==
The EO34 is officially defined as a U-shaped coastal road along most of the coast of the Pelion peninsula. From the junction with the EO6 and EO30 in Volos, the road heads east to Neochori, then heads north to Chorefto via Tsagkarada. Between Karavoma and Chorefto, the EO34 overlaps with the EO34a, a direct variant of the EO34 that goes through the Pelion mountain range.

== History ==
Ministerial Decision G25871 of 9 July 1963 created the EO34 from the old EO17, which existed by royal decree from 1955 until 1963, and followed a similar route as the current EO34 (except between Zagora and Chorefto). The road was subclassified as part of the tertiary network in 1995.

Between Volos and Ano Lechonia, parts of the EO34 used to share the route of the Pelion railway.
