= Android 14 =

2023 Android mobile operating system

- Version of the Android operating system

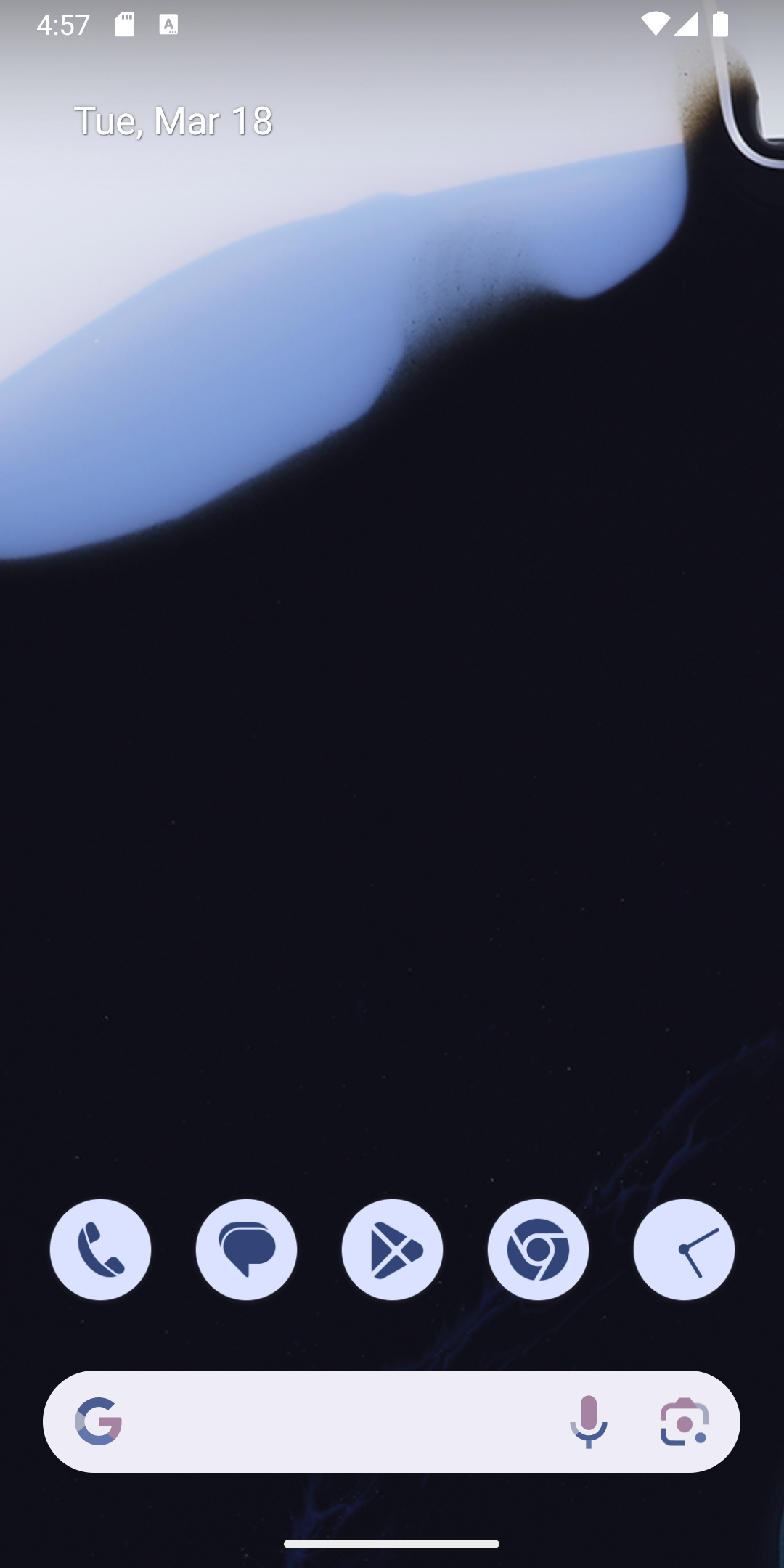
- Android 14 homescreen with Pixel Launcher
- Developer: Google
- OS family: Android
- Source model: Open-source software
- General availability: October 4, 2023 (3 years ago)
- Latest release: 14.0.0_r31 (USV1.230808.064) / November 2, 2026; 16 days ago
- Kernel type: Monolithic (Linux)
- Preceded by: Android 13
- Succeeded by: Android 15
- Official website: www.android.com/android-14/

Support status
- Supported until March 2027

Android 14 is the fourteenth major release and the 21st version of Android, the mobile operating system developed by the Open Handset Alliance led by Google. Both the Google and AOSP versions were released to the public on October 4, 2023. The first devices to ship with Android 14 are the Pixel 8 and Pixel 8 Pro.

As of November 2026, 11.45% of Android devices run Android 14, making it the 4th most widely used version of Android. This is the oldest Android version supported with the security source code.

== History ==
Android 14's Developer Preview logo

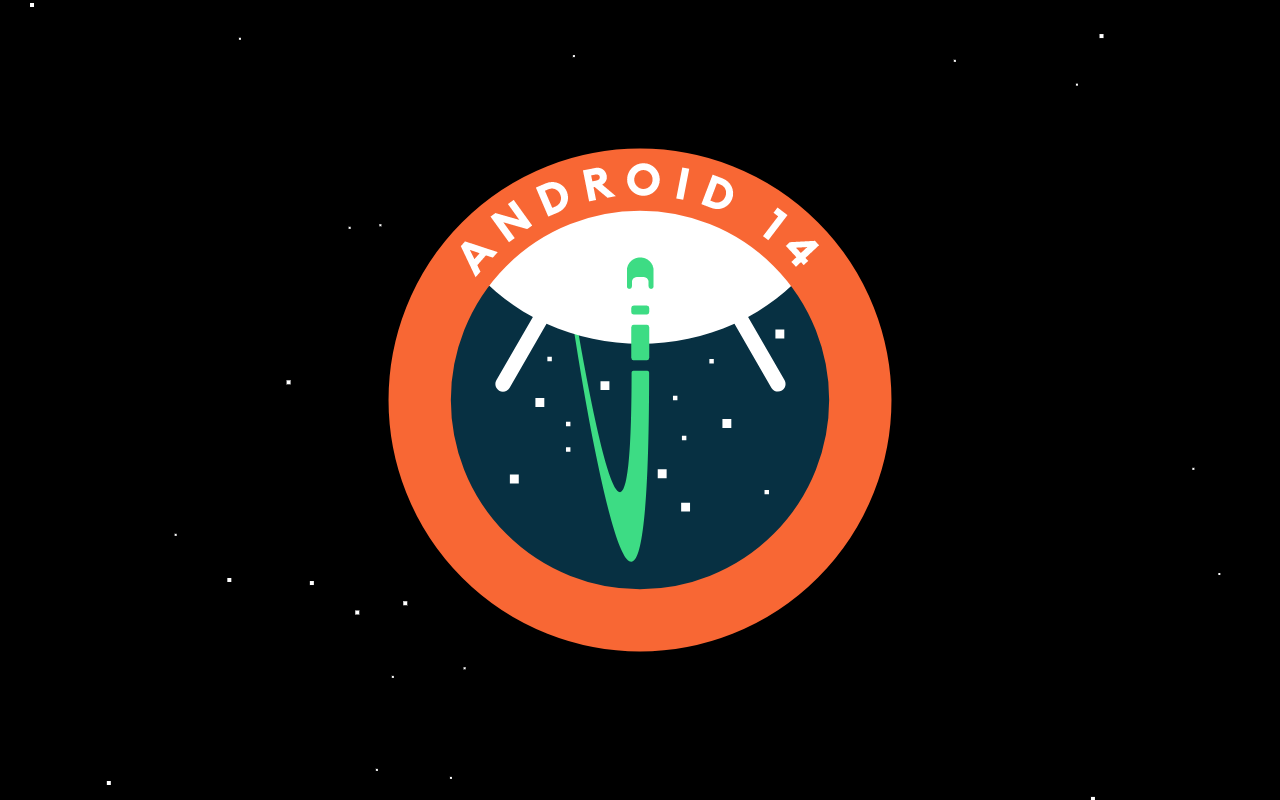
The Android 14 easter egg is accessed by going to Settings > About phone (or tablet) > Android version > Android version again a few times rapidly and pressing and holding the logo until the game comes up.

Android 14 (internally codenamed Upside Down Cake), was announced on February 8, 2023. A developer preview was released immediately for the Pixel 6 and 7 series, as well as a roadmap with the dates of updates. This contained another developer preview, which was published on March 8, as well as four monthly beta versions. The first beta was released on April 12 and received a hotfix to Beta 1.1 on April 26. The second beta was released on May 10, which also received a hotfix to Beta 2.1 on May 25. The third beta version was released on June 7, now reaching platform stability, which later received a hotfix to Beta 3.1 on June 14. The fourth beta version was released on July 11. Android 14 had 1 year, 1 month, 2 weeks and 5 days between Android 13's August 15, 2022, release, surpassing the Android 9–10 duration of 1 year and 4 weeks.

The beta versions are available for Pixel devices that are guaranteed to receive Android version updates, including the Pixel 4a (5G) or newer devices. Pixel 7a can also beta test Android 14 since Beta 3. The Pixel Tablet and Pixel Fold have been able to beta test Android 14 since Beta 4.

== Features ==
=== User experience ===
Building on the new option added in Android 13 to set languages individually for apps, this feature has been expanded and is now easier for developers to implement. Furthermore, a new "Grammatical Inflection API" has been added to gender users according to their preferred grammatical gender.

Android 14 provides the ability to increase the font size to 200%, up from 130% in previous versions, and nonlinear font scaling to prevent large text elements on screen from scaling too large. It is now possible to specify which temperature unit (Fahrenheit, Celsius, or Kelvin) to use in applications.

The Material You design language, introduced in Android 12 and supplemented in Android 13, gets revised default colors in Android 14. Android 14 also introduces additional lock screen customization options, such as multiple clock and weather styles.

In Android 14, for devices with a larger screen, such as tablets, the taskbar is expanded and now shows the names of the pinned apps.

Android 14 allows a phone to be configured as a webcam when plugged into a computer or another Android device.

Android 14 adds support for the new Ultra HDR image format to take and display high dynamic range photos with HDR-compatible cameras and displays. The Ultra HDR format is backwards compatible with JPEG on standard dynamic range displays.

Google rewrote parts of Android's Settings app to use its Jetpack Compose framework in Android 14.

=== Battery life ===
Android system processes are more efficient, improving battery life. In addition, there is now the option to choose directly between battery-saver mode and extreme battery-saver mode.

The screen time since the last full charge is now displayed in the battery settings. The battery consumption is shown separately from system and user applications. This feature was replaced at launch with Android 12, which showed battery usage over the past 24 hours.

=== Privacy and security ===
Android 14 blocks the installation of apps that target versions of Android below Marshmallow (6.0). The change is intended to curb the spread of malware that intentionally targets older versions of Android to bypass security restrictions introduced in newer versions. An Android Debug Bridge (ADB) install flag has been added to bypass the restriction.

To improve privacy, the user can select which images an application can access using a photo picker.

There is also a slight change in guest mode or multiuser mode: the "Allow guest to use phone" option has been moved to the top-level menu. Previously, this option was behind the guest account itself.

=== Health Connect ===
Incorporating Health Connect as one of the new features of Android 14, users can now access it through the all-new Pixel's settings menu. Health Connect collaborates with apps like Fitbit, Samsung Health, and Google Fit.

== See also ==
- Android version history
