= Samsung Galaxy A18 =

2026 mid-range Android smartphones manufactured by Samsung

Samsung Galaxy A18 LTE
- Brand: Samsung
- Manufacturer: Samsung Electronics
- Type: Smartphone
- Series: Galaxy A
- Family: Samsung Galaxy
- First released: 4G: September 15, 2026; 2 months ago
- Availability by region: 4G: September 18, 2026; 2 months ago
- Predecessor: Samsung Galaxy A17
- Related: Samsung Galaxy A08
- Compatible networks: 2G GSM, 3G WCDMA, 4G LTE, 5G Sub6
- Form factor: Slate
- Operating system: Original: Android 17 with One UI 9.0
- System-on-chip: Exynos 1610
- Memory: 4 GB / 6 GB / 8 GB (LPDDR4X)
- Storage: 64 GB / 128 GB / 256 GB
- Removable storage: microSDXC (uses shared SIM slot), expandable up to 2 TB
- SIM: Dual nano-SIM
- Battery: 5000 mAh
- Charging: 25W Super Fast Charging
- Rear camera: Triple-Camera Setup; Primary: Samsung ISOCELL S5KJN1; 50 MP, f/1.8, 26mm, FoV 78.7°, 1/2.76", 0.64µm, AF, OIS; Ultrawide: SmartSens SC501CS; 5 MP, f/2.2, 17mm, FoV 104.3°, 1/5.0", 1.12µm, FF; Macro: GalaxyCore GC02M1; 2 MP, f/2.4, 22mm, 1/5.0", 1.75µm, FF; Camera features: LED flash, Panorama, HDR; Video recording: 1080p@30fps, gyro-EIS
- Front camera: GalaxyCore GC13A0; 13 MP, f/2.0, 27mm (wide), FoV 78.1°, 1/3.06", 1.12µm, FF; Video recording: 1080p@30fps
- Display: 6.7 in (170 mm); 1080 x 2340 px resolution, 19.5:9 ratio (~385 ppi density); Super AMOLED, 90Hz, 800 nits (HBM); Corning Gorilla Glass 3
- Data inputs: Multi-touch screen; USB Type-C 2.0; Fingerprint scanner (side-mounted); Accelerometer; Gyroscope; Proximity sensor; Compass
- Water resistance: IP64 dust protected and water resistant (water splashes)

The Samsung Galaxy A18 is an Android-based smartphone developed and marketed by Samsung in 2026. The LTE variant was announced and released on September 15, 2026. The phone is part of the Samsung Galaxy A series.

== Specifications ==
=== Design ===
The LTE model continues to have a similar rear (camera layout) and Key Island design, similar to Galaxy A17 being its predecessor.

Galaxy A18 LTE
- Black
- Silver
- Light Blue

=== Hardware ===
==== Display ====
The device continues to use the same 6.7-inch Super AMOLED Infinity-U display from its predecessor. The screen protection was downgraded to Corning Gorilla Glass 3, from the Corning Gorilla Glass Victus on its predecessor.

==== Battery ====
The device has a 5000 mAh battery and 25 W fast charging support, just as its previous predecessors.

==== Performance ====
The LTE variant uses different chipsets (which would have been the first time since the LTE variant of the Galaxy A14 to have a chipset split): it either uses the Exynos 1610 system-on-a-chip (SoC) or the MediaTek Helio G99+ (which is a minor upgrade from its predecessor; also used on the Galaxy A08 and the Galaxy A07s).

For unknown reasons, the 64 GB internal storage option returned (also the first time since the Galaxy A14) alongside 128 GB or 256 GB storage options (all of which uses UFS 2.2), while memory options (4 GB, 6 GB or 8 GB) are similar to its predecessors. It continues to have a microSDXC card slot.

==== Camera ====
The A18 uses the same cameras as its predecessors: 50 MP primary rear camera, 5 MP ultrawide, 2 MP macro back cameras and 13 MP front cameras.

Camera		Resolution	Aperture	Video recording resolution
Rear	Wide (main)	50 MP (OIS)	f/1.8	1080p@30fps
Rear	Ultra-wide	5 MP	f/2.2	1080p@30fps
Rear	Macro	2 MP	f/2.4	—
Front camera		13 MP	f/2.0	1080p@30fps

=== Software ===
The A18 originally came with Android 17 with One UI 9 out of the box. It is scheduled to receive 6 major software updates and 6 years of security updates, ceasing to receive further major updates on October 2032.

	Pre-installed OS	OS Upgrades history						End of support
	Pre-installed OS	1st	2nd	3rd	4th	5th	6th	End of support
A18 LTE	Android 17 (One UI 9.0)							October 2032

Preceded by Samsung Galaxy A17/A17 5G	Samsung Galaxy A18/A18 5G; 2026	Succeeded by ---
