= Samsung Galaxy A08 =

2026 Android smartphones manufactured by Samsung Electronics

- Also sold as: Galaxy M08; Galaxy F08
- Brand: Samsung
- Manufacturer: Samsung Electronics
- Type: Smartphone
- Series: Galaxy A series Galaxy M series Galaxy F series
- Family: Samsung Galaxy
- First released: A08: September 15, 2026; 2 months ago M08 and F08: October 1, 2026; 52 days ago
- Predecessor: Samsung Galaxy A07/A07 5G
- Related: Samsung Galaxy A18
- Compatible networks: List: 2G bands: GSM 850 / 900 / 1800 / 1900; 3G bands: HSDPA 850 / 900 / 1700(AWS) / 1900 / 2100; 4G bands (LTE): 1, 2, 3, 4, 5, 7, 8, 12, 17, 20, 26, 28, 38, 40, 41, 66
- Form factor: Slate
- Operating system: Original: Android 17 with One UI 9.0
- System-on-chip: MediaTek
- Memory: 4, 6, 8 GB
- Storage: 64, 128, 256 GB
- Removable storage: Yes, up to 2 TB
- SIM: Dual nano-SIM
- Battery: LTE models: 6000 mAh
- Charging: 25W Super Fast Charging
- Rear camera: Dual-Camera Setup; Primary: Samsung ISOCELL (S5K)JN1; 50 MP, f/1.8, 26mm, 1/2.76", 0.64μm, PDAF; Depth: GalaxyCore GC02M1B; 2 MP, f/2.4, 1/5.0", 1.75μm Camera features: LED flash Video recording: 1080p@30/60fps
- Front camera: GalaxyCore GC08A8; 8 MP, f/2.0, 26mm (wide), 1/4.0", 1.12μm Video recording: 1080p@30fps
- Sound: Loudspeaker, 3.5 mm auxiliary (headphone jack)
- Connectivity: Wi-Fi 802.11 a/b/g/n/ac, dual-band, Wi-Fi Direct; Bluetooth 5.3, A2DP, LE
- Data inputs: Multi-touch screen; USB Type-C 2.0; Fingerprint scanner (side-mounted); Accelerometer; Proximity sensor
- Water resistance: IP64 dust protected and water resistant (water splashes)
- Website: UAE Website

The Samsung Galaxy A08 is an entry-level Android-based smartphone manufactured, developed and marketed by Samsung Electronics, as part of the Galaxy A series. The LTE variant of the A08 was announced and released on September 15, 2026.

There were rebranded versions of the device: the Galaxy M08 and Galaxy F08 were both announced on October 1, 2026.

== Specifications ==
=== Design ===
The build has a glass front, plastic back, and plastic frame and is the first A0x series device to have a IP64 certification (an upgrade from IP54 on its predecessor).

Galaxy A08 LTE
- Dark Blue
- Green
- Silver

=== Hardware ===
The device is equipped with GSM, HSPA, LTE, Wi-Fi 802.11 a/b/g/n/ac dual-band, Wi-Fi Direct, Bluetooth 5.3 with A2DP and LE. It has support for FM Radio. It has a USB Type-C 2.0 port and a 3.5mm jack.

==== Display ====
Like its predecessor, the LTE variant has a 6.7-inch 90 Hz touchscreen, with PLS LCD, Infinity-U, and HD+ (1600 x 720 pixels) resolution.

==== Battery ====
The LTE variant has a 6000 mAh battery (an upgrade from the 5000 mAh found on its predecessor) and supports 25W Super fast charging.

==== Performance ====
The A08 and its counterparts use the MediaTek Helio G99+ processor, which is a modified variant of the MediaTek Helio G99 (used on its predecessors).

Also the same as its predecessor, it features 64 GB, 128 GB, and 256 GB internal storage options (with support for microSD cards), while RAM options are in 4 GB, 6 GB, or 8 GB.

==== Camera ====
The rear camera uses the same dual camera setup from its predecessor: 50 MP main camera and 2 MP depth camera. The front camera uses a 8 MP single camera, capable of recording up to 1080p at 30 fps.

=== Software ===
The LTE variants come with the Android 17 and One UI 9 pre-installed. The variants are set to receive 6 Android OS upgrades and 6 years of security updates (with support ending on October 2032).

	Pre-installed OS	OS Upgrades history						End of support
	Pre-installed OS	1st	2nd	3rd	4th	5th	6th	End of support
A08 LTE	Android 17 (One UI 9.0)							October 2032
