= Samsung Galaxy A57 5G =

2026 mid-range smartphone by Samsung Electronics

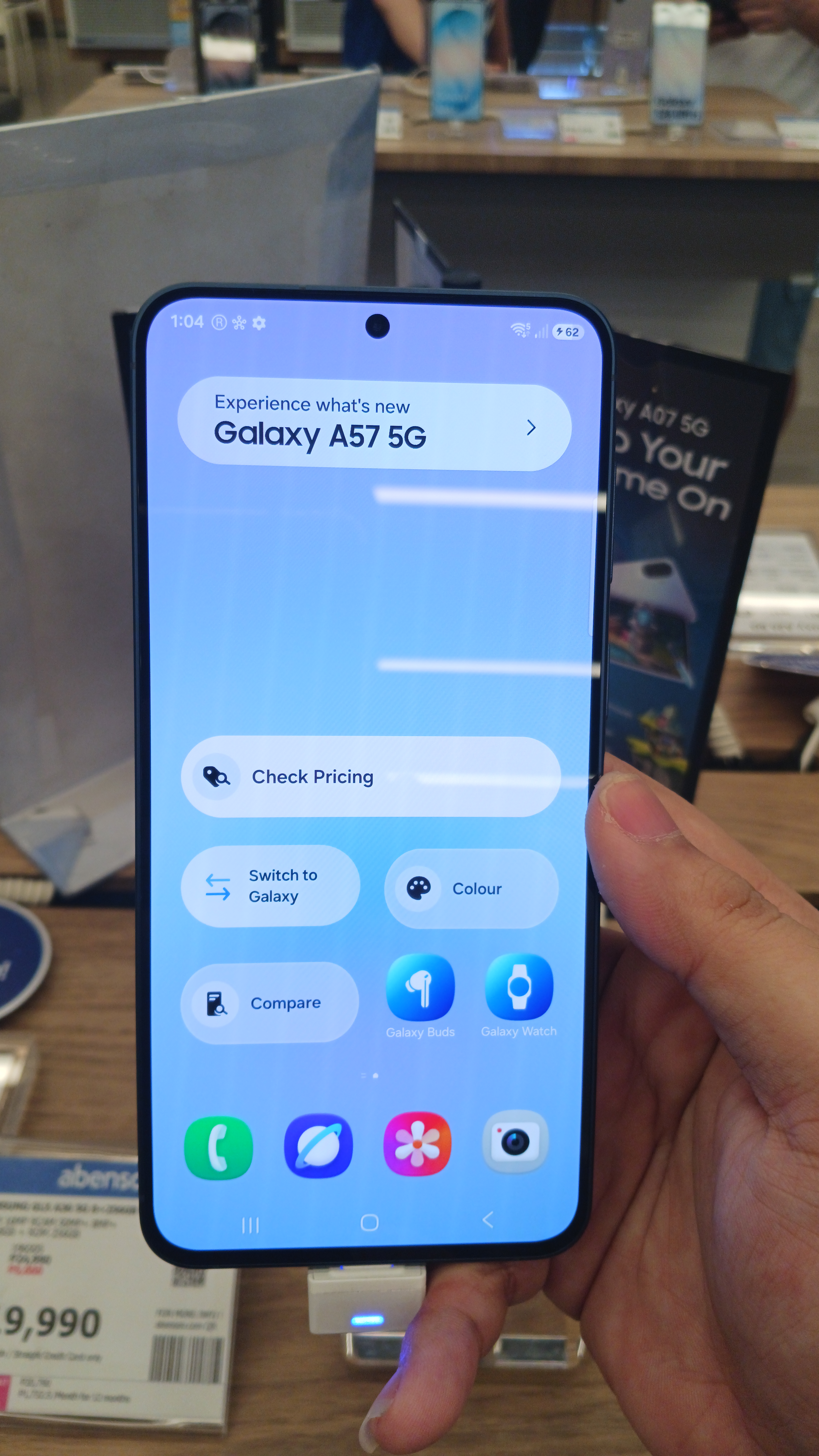
- Also sold as: Galaxy Quantum 7 (in South Korea)
- Brand: Samsung
- Manufacturer: Samsung Electronics
- Type: Smartphone
- Series: Galaxy A
- Family: Samsung Galaxy
- First released: March 25, 2026; 7 months ago
- Availability by region: April 9, 2026; 7 months ago
- Predecessor: Samsung Galaxy A56 5G
- Related: Samsung Galaxy A07; Samsung Galaxy A17; Samsung Galaxy A27 5G; Samsung Galaxy A37 5G
- Compatible networks: List: Technology: GSM / HSPA / LTE / 5G; 2G bands: GSM 850 / 900 / 1800 / 1900; 3G bands: HSDPA 850 / 900 / 1700(AWS) / 1900 / 2100; 4G bands (LTE): 1, 2, 3, 4, 5, 7, 8, 12, 17, 20, 25, 26, 28, 32, 38, 40, 41, 66; 5G bands: 1, 3, 5, 7, 8, 20, 28, 38, 40, 41, 66, 77, 78 SA/NSA/Sub6; Speed: HSPA, LTE, 5G
- Form factor: Slate
- Colors: Awesome Lilac; Awesome Icyblue; Awesome Navy Blue; Awesome Gray
- Dimensions: 161.5 mm (6.36 in) H 76.8 mm (3.02 in) W 6.9 mm (0.27 in) D
- Weight: 179 g (6.3 oz)
- Operating system: Original: Android 16 with One UI 8.5; Current: Android 17 with One UI 9.0
- System-on-chip: Exynos 1680
- CPU: Octa-core (1x2.9 GHz Cortex-720 & 4x2.6 GHz Cortex-720 & 3x1.95 GHz Cortex-520)
- GPU: Xclipse 550
- Memory: 8 GB / 12 GB
- Storage: 128 GB / 256 GB / 512 GB
- Removable storage: N/A
- SIM: nano-SIM + eSIM; nano-SIM + nano-SIM + eSIM + eSIM (max 2 at a time)
- Battery: 5000 mAh
- Charging: 45 W Super Fast Charging
- Rear camera: Primary: Sony IMX 906 or Samsung ISOCELL (S5K)GNJ (region dependent); 50 MP, f/1.8, 23mm, FoV 85.3°, 1/1.56", 1.0 μm, PDAF, OIS; Ultrawide: Samsung ISOCELL (S5K)3L6; 12 MP, f/2.2, 13mm, FoV 116.3°, 1/3.06", 1.12 μm, FF; Macro: GalaxyCore GC05A3; 5 MP, f/2.4, 25mm, 1/5.0", 1.12 μm, FF; Camera features: Best Face, LED flash, Panorama, HDR; Video recording: 4K@30fps, 1080p@30/60fps, HDR, gyro-EIS
- Front camera: Sony IMX 823; 12 MP, f/2.2, 25mm (wide), FoV 82°, 1/3.2", 1.12 μm, FF; 4K@30fps, 1080p@30/60fps, 10-bit HDR
- Display: 6.7 in (170 mm); 1080 x 2340 px resolution, 19.5:9 ratio (~385 ppi density); Super AMOLED+, 120Hz, 1200 nits (HBM), 1900 nits (peak); Corning Gorilla Glass Victus+, Mohs level 5
- Sound: Stereo speakers
- Connectivity: 5G, Bluetooth 6
- Water resistance: IP68 dust tight and water resistant (immersible up to 1.5m for 30 min)
- Model: SM-A576x (last letter varies by carrier and international models)

The Samsung Galaxy A57 5G is an upper-mid-range Android-based smartphone manufactured and developed by Samsung Electronics, as part of the mid-range Galaxy A series, announced on March 25, 2026, alongside the Galaxy A37 5G.

In South Korea, this device is sold as the Galaxy Quantum7, which was announced and released on August 26, 2026.

== Specifications ==
=== Design ===
Similar to its predecessor, it continues to feature an aluminum frame and a glass back (protected with Corning Gorilla Glass Victus+). For the first time in the Galaxy A series since the release of the Galaxy A8 (2018), the device now has an IP68 rating, up from the IP67 on its predecessors. It also has a much thinner and lighter build (at 6.9 mm and 179g), compared to its predecessor (at 7.4 mm and 198g).

Galaxy A57 5G
- Awesome Lilac
- Awesome Icyblue
- Awesome Navy Blue
- Awesome Gray

=== Hardware ===
==== Display ====
Similar to its predecessor, it features a 6.7 in (170 mm), with an Infinity-O Display, a 1080 x 2340 px resolution, 19.5:9 ratio (~385 ppi density), and 120Hz refresh rate. The display type is upgraded to a SuperAMOLED+ display, which was last used on the Galaxy M54 5G and the Galaxy A73 5G. Alongside the upgrade to its display type, it is also the first Galaxy A device to have a display panel that comes from CSOT Display (a Chinese display maker), as opposed to Samsung Display used on its predecessors, resulting in thinner bezels.

==== Battery ====
It is equipped with a 5000 mAh battery and 45W Fast Charging, like its predecessors.

==== Processor and memory ====
The Galaxy A57 5G is powered by the 4 nm Exynos 1680 chipset, which features the Xclipse 550 graphics processing unit. RAM options remain at 8 or 12 GB, while a 512 GB internal storage option is now offered (a first for the Galaxy A series), joining the existing 128 GB and 256 GB configurations. Also similar to its predecessor is the use of UFS 3.1 internal storage type, and the absence of the microSD card slot.

==== Camera ====
The camera setup (both front and rear) remains unchanged from its predecessor: 50 MP main with OIS, 12 MP ultrawide, 5 MP macro, and a 12 MP front camera. While it maintained the camera setup, it includes improvements when switching between ultrawide and main cameras, similar to the mechanism used on the Galaxy S devices.

=== Software ===
The Galaxy A57 5G, like the Galaxy A37 5G, has Android 16 with One UI 8.5 pre-installed, being the second set of Galaxy devices to have One UI 8.5 pre-installed. Like its predecessor, it is supported for 6 OS upgrades and 6 years of security updates (until 2032).

	Pre-installed OS	OS Upgrades history						End of support
	Pre-installed OS	1st	2nd	3rd	4th	5th	6th	End of support
A57 5G; Quantum 7 (South Korea)	Android 16 (One UI 8.5)	Android 17 (One UI 9.0); October 2026						Within 2032
