= Samsung Galaxy A27 5G =

2026 mid-range smartphone by Samsung Electronics

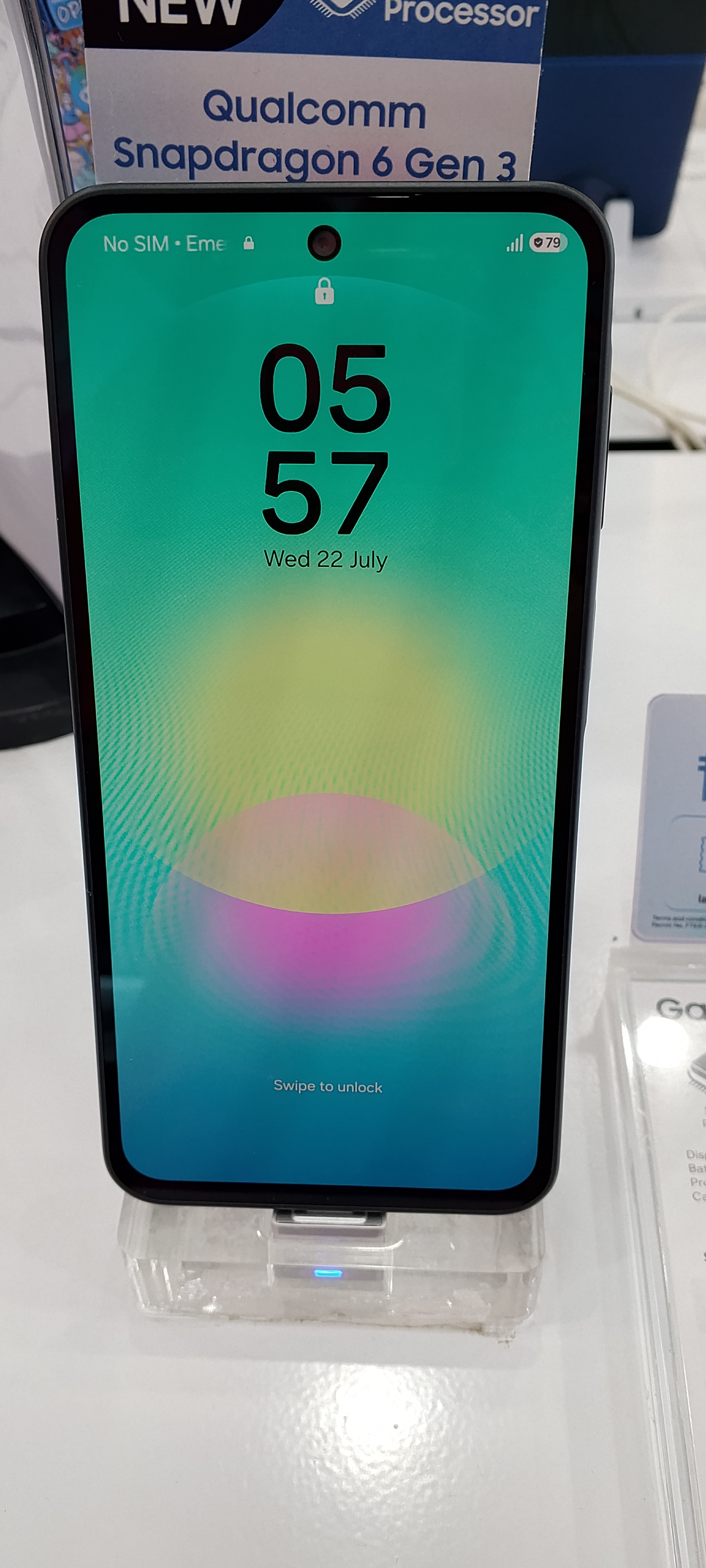
- Samsung Galaxy A27 (Black)
- Also sold as: Galaxy M47 5G; Galaxy Jump 5 (South Korea); Galaxy F70 Pro 5G
- Brand: Samsung
- Manufacturer: Samsung Electronics
- Type: Smartphone
- Series: Galaxy A/Galaxy M/Galaxy F
- Family: Samsung Galaxy
- First released: A27 5G: June 25, 2026; 4 months ago M47 5G: June 29, 2026; 3 months ago Jump 5: July 2, 2026; 3 months ago F70 Pro 5G: August 3, 2026; 2 months ago
- Availability by region: A27 5G: July 3, 2026; 3 months ago M47 5G: July 4, 2026; 3 months ago Jump 5: July 3, 2026; 3 months ago (South Korea); F70 Pro 5G: August 8, 2026; 2 months ago
- Predecessor: Samsung Galaxy A26 5G; Samsung Galaxy M36 5G (Galaxy Jump 4)
- Related: Samsung Galaxy A07; Samsung Galaxy A17; Samsung Galaxy A37 5G; Samsung Galaxy A57 5G
- Compatible networks: 2G, 3G, 4G, 5G
- Form factor: Slate
- Colors: Black; Blue; Light Green; Light Pink; Rogue Red; Blaze Blue; Alpha Black; Aura Green
- Operating system: Original: Android 16 with One UI 8.5; Current: Android 17 with One UI 9.0
- System-on-chip: Qualcomm SM6475-AB Snapdragon 6 Gen 3 (4 nm)
- CPU: Octa-core (4x2.4 GHz Cortex-A78 & 4x1.8 GHz Cortex-A55)
- GPU: Adreno 710
- Memory: 6 GB, 8 GB RAM
- Storage: 128 GB or 256 GB
- Removable storage: microSDXC
- SIM: Single SIM (Nano-SIM) or Dual SIM (Nano-SIM, dual stand-by)
- Battery: A27 5G: 5000 mAh; M47 5G & F70 Pro 5G: 6000 mAh
- Charging: A27 5G: Fast charging 25W; M47 5G & F70 Pro 5G: Fast charging 45W
- Rear camera: Triple-Camera Setup; Primary: 50 MP, f/1.8, 27mm, FoV 78.4°, 1/2.76", 0.64 μm, PDAF, OIS; Ultrawide: 8 MP, f/2.2, 16mm, FoV 108.7°, 1/4.0", 1.12 μm Macro: 2 MP, f/2.4, 1/5.0", 1.75 μm Camera features: LED flash, panorama, HDR; Video recording: 4K@30fps, 1080p@30fps, 720p@480fps, gyro-EIS
- Front camera: 12 MP, f/2.2, 25mm (wide), FoV 80.6°, 1/3.06", 1.12 μm Video recording: 1080p@30fps
- Connectivity: Wi-Fi 802.11 a/b/g/n/ac, dual-band, Wi-Fi Direct, hotspot Bluetooth 5.3, A2DP, LE; GPS, GALILEO, GLONASS, BDS, QZSS, NFC
- Data inputs: Multi-touch screen USB Type-C 2.0; Fingerprint scanner (side-mounted); Accelerometer; Gyroscope; Compass
- Water resistance: IP64 dust/water splashes or spray from all directions
- Model: A27 5G: SM-A276x; M47 5G: SM-M476x; F70 Pro 5G: SM-E476x (last letter varies by carrier & international models)
- Website: Galaxy A27 5G

The Samsung Galaxy A27 5G is a mid-range Android-based smartphone manufactured, developed, designed and marketed by Samsung Electronics as a part of its Galaxy A series. The phone was announced on June 25, 2026, and was released in select countries on July 3, 2026.

The device also had rebranded versions: the Galaxy M47 5G (announced on June 29, 2026), the Galaxy Jump 5 for South Korea (announced on July 2, 2026), and the Galaxy F70 Pro 5G (announced on August 3, 2026).

== Specifications ==
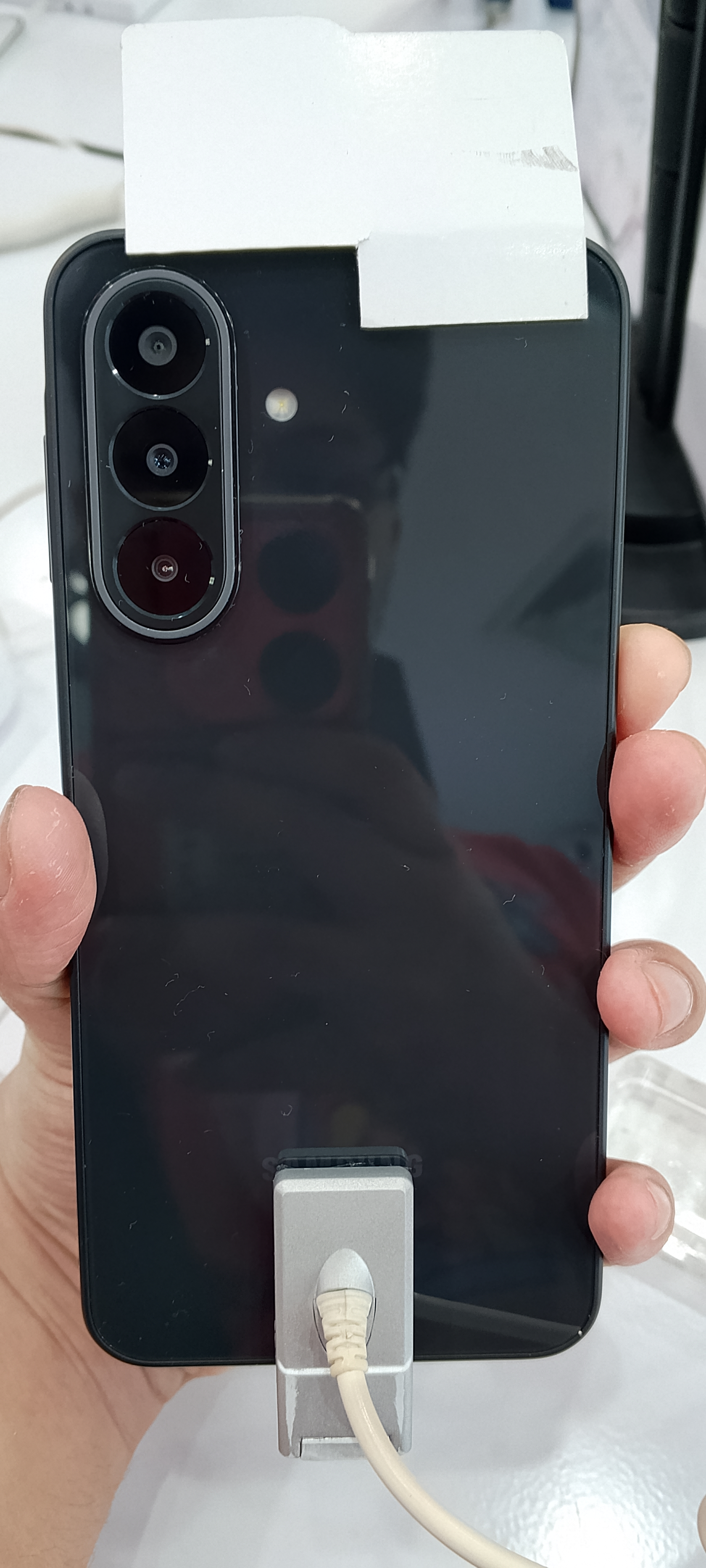
Rear panel of the A27 5G

=== Design ===
The phone, just like its predecessor, features a glass front and back and has a plastic frame. Its IP rating was downgraded from the IP67 found on its predecessor, to just IP64.

Galaxy A27 5G Galaxy Jump 5	Galaxy M47 5G	Galaxy F70 Pro 5G
Black; Blue; Light Green; Light Pink	Rogue Red; Blaze Blue	Alpha Black; Aura Green

=== Hardware ===
==== Display ====
The phone features a 6.7 in Super AMOLED display with a 120 Hz refresh rate, same as its predecessor. The only change is the screen cut-out, which now has an Infinity-O display instead of the teardrop notch found on the previous Galaxy A2x models, the first since the release of the Galaxy A21.

==== Battery ====
The Galaxy A27 has the same 5000mAh battery with 25W Fast Charging support from its predecessor. The Galaxy M47 and F70 Pro, meanwhile, have a larger 6000mAh battery with 45W Fast Charging support.

==== Processor and memory ====
All models uses the Qualcomm Snapdragon 6 Gen 3 processor, which was also used on the Galaxy A36. Storage and RAM options are the same as its predecessor (either 128GB or 256GB, and 6 GB or 8 GB, respectively). Support for microSD cards is still present.

A first for the Galaxy A2x lineup is the UFS 3.1 internal storage type, an upgrade from the UFS 2.2 on the predecessor.

==== Camera ====
All models have a triple rear camera setup: the primary rear and macro cameras remain at 50 MP and 2 MP, respectively, while the ultrawide camera was downgraded to 5 MP (its predecessor had an 8 MP ultrawide). The front uses a 12MP camera, a slight difference from the 13 MP found on its predecessor.

Camera		Resolution	Aperture	Video recording resolution
Rear	Wide (main)	50 MP (OIS)	f/1.8	4K@30fps
Rear	Ultra-wide	5 MP	f/2.2	1080p@30fps
Rear	Macro	2 MP	f/2.4	—
Front camera		12 MP	f/2.2	1080p@30fps

=== Software ===
The devices are set to receive 6 OS upgrades and 6 years of security updates (until 2032). It also has AI features dubbed "Awesome Intelligence".

	Pre-installed OS	OS Upgrades history						End of support
	Pre-installed OS	1st	2nd	3rd	4th	5th	6th	End of support
A27 5G; Jump 5 (South Korea)	Android 16 (One UI 8.5)	Android 17 (One UI 9.0); October 2026						Within 2032
M47 5G	Android 16 (One UI 8.5)	Android 17 (One UI 9.0); October 2026						Within 2032
F70 Pro 5G	Android 16 (One UI 8.5)	Android 17 (One UI 9.0); October 2026						Within 2032
