= Samsung Galaxy A37 5G =

2026 Android-based smartphone by Samsung

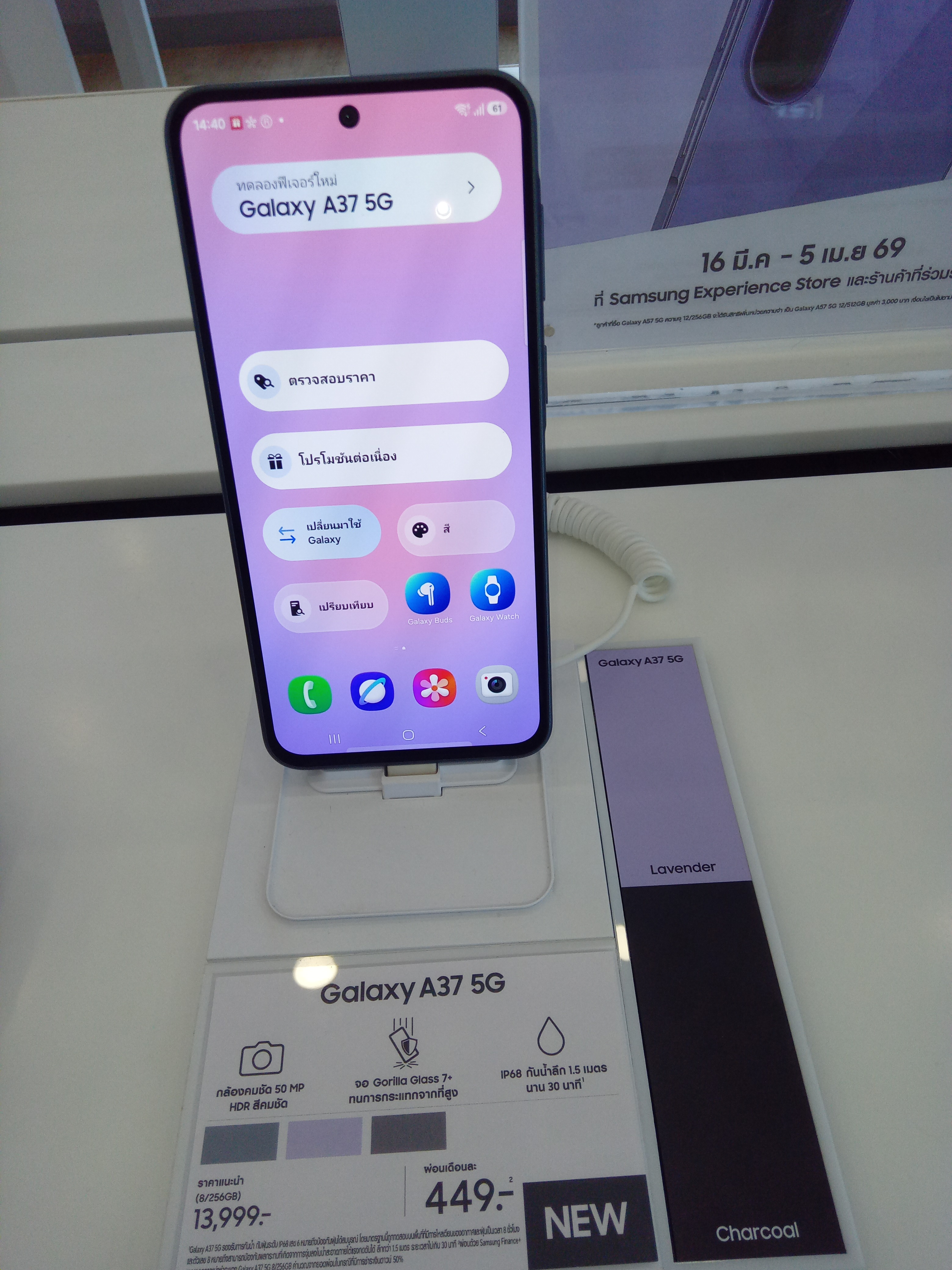
- Samsung Galaxy A37 5G in the Awesome Charcoal color variant
- Brand: Samsung
- Manufacturer: Samsung Electronics
- Type: Smartphone
- Series: Galaxy A
- Family: Samsung Galaxy
- First released: March 25, 2026; 7 months ago
- Availability by region: April 10, 2026; 6 months ago
- Predecessor: Samsung Galaxy A36 5G
- Related: Samsung Galaxy A07; Samsung Galaxy A17; Samsung Galaxy A27 5G; Samsung Galaxy A57 5G
- Compatible networks: List: Technology: GSM / HSPA / LTE / 5G; 2G bands: GSM 850 / 900 / 1800 / 1900; 3G bands: HSDPA 850 / 900 / 1700(AWS) / 1900 / 2100; 4G bands (LTE): 1, 2, 3, 4, 5, 7, 8, 12, 17, 20, 25, 26, 28, 32, 38, 40, 41, 66; 5G bands: 1, 3, 5, 7, 8, 20, 28, 38, 40, 41, 66, 77, 78 SA/NSA/Sub6; Speed: HSPA, LTE, 5G
- Form factor: Slate
- Colors: Awesome Graygreen; Awesome Lavender; Awesome Charcoal; Awesome White
- Dimensions: 162.9 mm (6.41 in) H 78.2 mm (3.08 in) W 7.4 mm (0.29 in) G
- Weight: 196 g (6.9 oz)
- Operating system: Original: Android 16 with One UI 8.5; Current: Android 17 with One UI 9.0
- System-on-chip: Exynos 1480
- CPU: Octa-core (4x2.75 GHz Cortex-A78 & 4x2.0 GHz Cortex-A55)
- GPU: Xclipse 530
- Memory: 6 / 8 / 12 GB
- Storage: 128 / 256 GB
- Removable storage: N/A
- SIM: nano-SIM + eSIM; nano-SIM + nano-SIM + eSIM + eSIM (max 2 at a time)
- Battery: 5000 mAh
- Charging: 45W Super Fast Charging
- Rear camera: Primary: Sony IMX 906 or Samsung ISOCELL (S5K)GNJ (region dependent); 50 MP, f/1.8, 23mm, FoV 85.3°, 1/1.56", 1.0 μm, PDAF, OIS; Ultrawide: GalaxyCore GC08A3; 8 MP, f/2.2, 16mm, FoV 108.7°, 1/4.0", 1.12 μm, FF; Macro: GalaxyCore GC05A3; 5 MP, f/2.4, 25mm, 1/5.0", 1.12 μm, FF; Camera features: LED flash, Panorama, HDR; Video recording resolutions: 4K@30fps, 1080p@30/60fps, gyro-EIS
- Front camera: GalaxyCore GC12A2; 12 MP, f/2.2, 25mm (wide), FoV 80.8°, 1/3.2", 1.12 μm, FF; 4K@30fps, 1080p@30fps, 10-bit HDR
- Display: 6.7 in (170 mm); 1080 x 2340 px resolution, 19.5:9 ratio (~385 ppi density); Super AMOLED, 120Hz, 1200 nits (HBM), 1900 nits (peak); Corning Gorilla Glass Victus+, Mohs level 5
- Sound: Stereo speakers
- Connectivity: 5G, Wi-Fi 6, Bluetooth 5.3
- Water resistance: IP68 dust tight and water resistant (immersible up to 1.5m for 30 min)
- Model: SM-A376x (last letter varies by carrier and international models)

The Samsung Galaxy A37 5G is a mid-range Android-based smartphone manufactured and developed by Samsung Electronics, as part of the mid-range Galaxy A series, announced on March 25, 2026 alongside the Galaxy A57 5G, and was released on April 10, 2026.

== Specifications ==
=== Design ===
Like the Galaxy A57 5G, it upgrades the IP rating to IP68, up from IP67 on both the A36 and A35. The materials used for the frame (made of plastic) and back (glass protected with Corning Gorilla Glass Victus+) remains the same from its predecessor.

Galaxy A37 5G
- Awesome Graygreen
- Awesome Lavender
- Awesome Charcoal
- Awesome White

=== Hardware ===
==== Display ====
Its display remains unchanged from its predecessor: it has a 6.7-inch (170 mm) Super AMOLED panel with FHD+ resolution (2340 × 1080) and a 19.5:9 aspect ratio, with a pixel density of around 385 PPI. The refresh rate goes up to 120 Hz, and peak brightness is rated at 1,900 nits with support for Vision Booster. The front glass is also protected with the Corning Gorilla Glass Victus+.

==== Camera ====
The rear cameras is carried over with its predecessor: 50 MP primary rear camera, 8 MP ultrawide, 5 MP macro, and a 12 MP front camera. Compared to its predecessor, the A37 uses an improved Image Signal Processor (ISP) that Samsung says reduces noise and improves color accuracy in low light.

Alongside the Galaxy A57 5G, it includes improvements when switching between ultrawide and main cameras, similar to the mechanism used on the Galaxy S and Z series devices.

Camera		Resolution	Aperture	Video recording resolution
Rear	Wide (main)	50 MP (OIS)	f/1.8	4K@30fps
Rear	Ultra-wide	8 MP	f/2.2	1080p@30fps
Rear	Macro	5 MP	f/2.4	—
Front camera		12 MP	f/2.2	4K@30fps

==== Processor and memory ====
It is powered by the 4 nm Exynos 1480 chipset, which was first used on the Galaxy A55 5G. RAM options still ranges from 6 GB to 12 GB, while internal storage options are either in 128 GB or 256 GB. Internal storage type is upgraded to UFS 3.1, a first for the Galaxy A3x series. Also similar to its predecessor is the absence of the microSD card slot.

=== Software ===
The Galaxy A37 5G ships with Android 16 and One UI 8.5. Just like its predecessor, it is supported with 6 OS upgrades and 6 years of security updates (until 2032).

	Pre-installed OS	OS Upgrades history						End of support
	Pre-installed OS	1st	2nd	3rd	4th	5th	6th	End of support
A37 5G	Android 16 (One UI 8.5)	Android 17 (One UI 9.0); October 2026						Within 2032
