= Samsung Galaxy A17 =

2025 mid-range Android smartphones manufactured by Samsung

Samsung Galaxy A17 Samsung Galaxy A17 5G
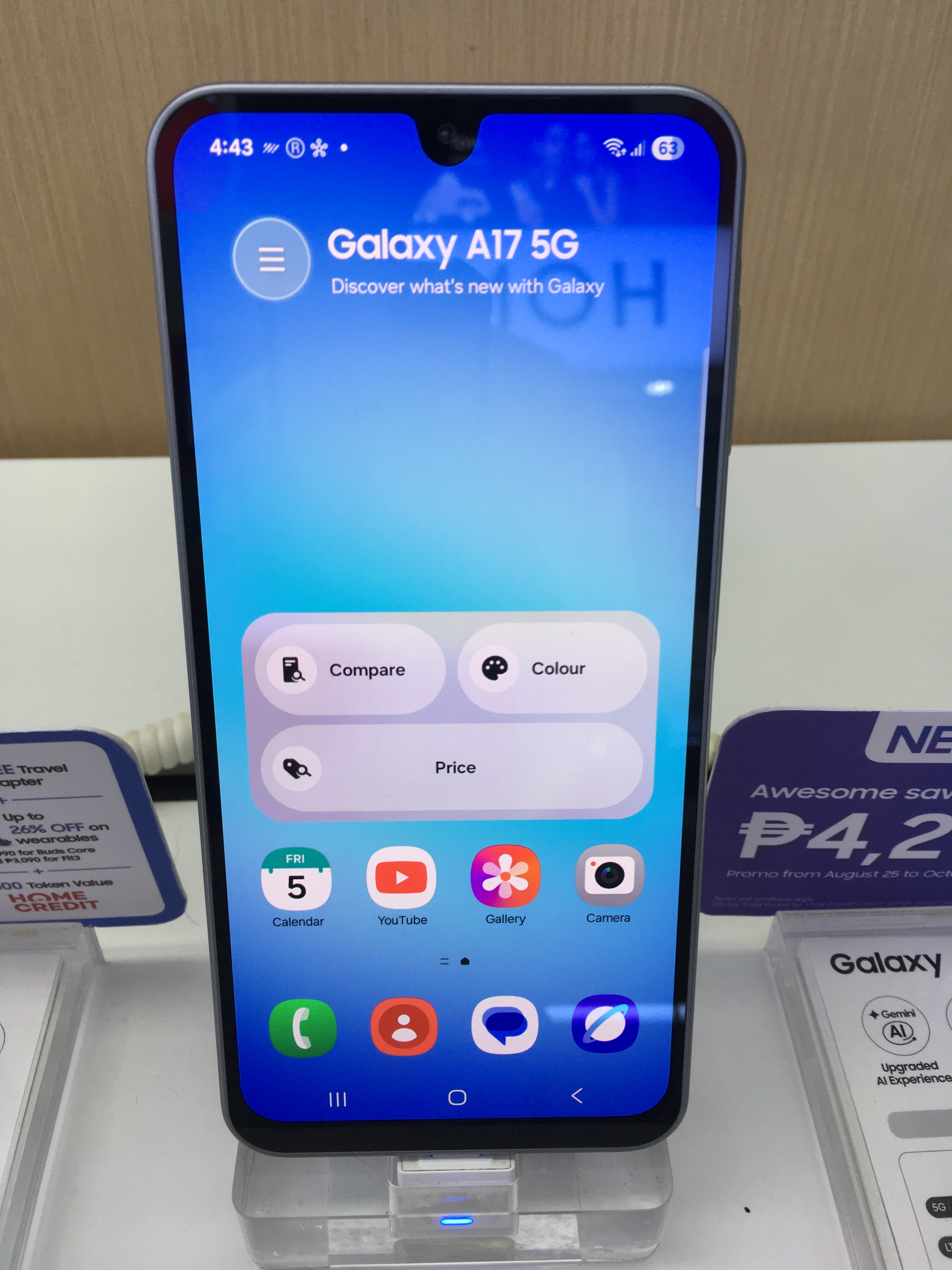
- Also sold as: Galaxy M17 5G; Galaxy F17 5G; Galaxy Buddy 5 (South Korea); Galaxy Wide 9 (South Korea)
- Brand: Samsung
- Manufacturer: Samsung Electronics
- Type: Smartphone
- Series: Galaxy A
- Family: Samsung Galaxy
- First released: 4G: September 18, 2025; 13 months ago 5G: August 6, 2025; 14 months ago
- Availability by region: 4G: September 18, 2025; 13 months ago 5G: August 18, 2025; 14 months ago
- Predecessor: Samsung Galaxy A16
- Successor: Samsung Galaxy A18
- Related: Samsung Galaxy A07; Samsung Galaxy A27 5G; Samsung Galaxy A37 5G; Samsung Galaxy A57 5G
- Compatible networks: 2G GSM, 3G WCDMA, 4G LTE, 5G Sub6
- Form factor: Slate
- Colors: Black, Blue, Grey
- Dimensions: 164.4 mm (6.47 in) H 77.9 mm (3.07 in) W 7.5 mm (0.30 in) D
- Weight: 4G: 190 g (6.7 oz); 5G: 192 g (6.8 oz)
- Operating system: Original: Android 15 with One UI 7.0; Current: Android 17 with One UI 9.0
- System-on-chip: 4G: MediaTek Helio G99; 5G: Samsung Exynos 1330
- CPU: 4G: Octa-core (2x2.2 GHz Cortex-A76 & 6x2.0 GHz Cortex-A55); 5G: Octa-core (2x2.4 GHz Cortex-A78 & 6x2.0 GHz Cortex-A55)
- GPU: 4G: Mali-G57 MC2; 5G: Mali-G68 MP2
- Memory: 4 GB / 6 GB / 8 GB (LPDDR4X)
- Storage: 128 GB / 256 GB
- Removable storage: microSDXC (uses shared SIM slot), expandable up to 2 TB
- SIM: Dual nano-SIM
- Battery: 5000 mAh
- Charging: 25W Super Fast Charging
- Rear camera: Triple-Camera Setup; Primary: Samsung ISOCELL S5KJN1; 50 MP, f/1.8, 26mm, FoV 78.7°, 1/2.76", 0.64µm, AF, OIS; Ultrawide: SmartSens SC501CS; 5 MP, f/2.2, 17mm, FoV 104.3°, 1/5.0", 1.12µm, FF; Macro: GalaxyCore GC02M1; 2 MP, f/2.4, 22mm, 1/5.0", 1.75µm, FF; Camera features: LED flash, Panorama, HDR; Video recording: 1080p@30fps, gyro-EIS
- Front camera: GalaxyCore GC13A0; 13 MP, f/2.0, 27mm (wide), FoV 78.1°, 1/3.06", 1.12µm, FF; Video recording: 1080p@30fps
- Display: 6.7 in (170 mm); 1080 x 2340 px resolution, 19.5:9 ratio (~385 ppi density); Super AMOLED, 90Hz, 800 nits (HBM); Corning Gorilla Glass Victus
- Data inputs: Multi-touch screen; USB Type-C 2.0; Fingerprint scanner (side-mounted); Accelerometer; Gyroscope; Proximity sensor; Compass
- Water resistance: IP54 dust protected and water resistant (water splashes)
- Website: UK Website; US Website
- References: "Samsung Galaxy A17 5G". GSMArena.; "Samsung Galaxy A17 4G". GSMArena.

The Samsung Galaxy A17 and Galaxy A17 5G are Android-powered smartphones developed and marketed by Samsung in 2025. The 5G model was first unveiled on August 6, 2025, while the LTE model was unveiled on September 18, 2025. Like its predecessor, the Samsung Galaxy A16, it will receive 6 years of software updates, ceasing to receive further updates in 2031. The phone is part of the Samsung Galaxy A series.

There were also rebranded versions of this device: the Galaxy F17 5G (released on September 11, 2025), the Galaxy M17 5G (released on October 10, 2025), the Galaxy Buddy 5 (released on May 15, 2026), and the Galaxy Wide 9 (released on July 3, 2026), with the latter two devices exclusively sold for South Korea.

== Specifications ==
=== Design ===
Both devices continue to have a similar rear (camera layout) and Key Island design. The LTE model have a slightly reflective back texture, while the 5G models have a matte finish.

Galaxy A17 LTE	Galaxy A17 5G Galaxy Buddy 5	Galaxy M17 5G Galaxy Wide 9	Galaxy F17 5G
Black; Gray; Light Blue	Black; Gray; Blue	Sapphire Black; Moonlight Silver	Neo Black; Violet Pop

=== Hardware ===
==== Display ====
All models continue to have the same 6.7-inch Super AMOLED display as before, with a refresh rate of 90 Hz, but now features Corning Gorilla Glass Victus protective glass (a first for the Galaxy A1x series). Despite having a Super AMOLED display like its predecessors, it does not support an 'always-on display' function.

==== Battery ====
All models still continue to have a 5000 mAh battery and 25 W fast charging support.

==== Performance ====
The LTE models continue to use the MediaTek Helio G99 system-on-a-chip (SoC) (which was used since the release of the Galaxy A15 LTE), while the 5G models also continue to use the Samsung Exynos 1330 SoC (which was also used for select variants of the Galaxy A14 5G and Galaxy A16 5G).

Also similar to its predecessors, it features 128 GB and 256 GB storage options, 4 GB, 6 GB and 8 GB memory options and a microSDXC card slot. All models continue to use UFS 2.2 for its internal storage.

==== Camera ====
Its cameras are now housed together in one camera portion, and are now thinner than the A16. The cameras' setup themselves are the same as the A16, though, with the same 50 MP main (albeit with OIS, a first for the Galaxy A1x/M1x/F1x lineup), 5MP ultrawide and 2 MP macro back cameras and 13 MP front camera as before.

Camera		Resolution	Aperture	Video recording resolution
Rear	Wide (main)	50 MP (OIS)	f/1.8	1080p@30fps
Rear	Ultra-wide	5 MP	f/2.2	1080p@30fps
Rear	Macro	2 MP	f/2.4	—
Front camera		13 MP	f/2.0	1080p@30fps

=== Software ===
All models originally came with Android 15 with One UI 7 out of the box. It is scheduled to receive 6 major software updates and 6 years of security updates, ceasing to receive further major updates in 2031.

	Pre-installed OS	OS Upgrades history						End of support
	Pre-installed OS	1st	2nd	3rd	4th	5th	6th	End of support
A17 LTE; A17 5G; Buddy 5 (South Korea)	Android 15 (One UI 7.0)	Android 16 (One UI 8.0); September 2025 (One UI 8.5); May 2026	Android 17 (One UI 9.0); October 2026					Within 2031
F17 5G	Android 15 (One UI 7.0)	Android 16 (One UI 8.0); October 2025 (One UI 8.5); June 2026	Android 17 (One UI 9.0); October 2026					Within 2031
M17 5G; Wide 9 (South Korea)	Android 15 (One UI 7.0)	Android 16 (One UI 8.0); October 2025 (One UI 8.5); June 2026	Android 17 (One UI 9.0); October 2026					Within 2031

== Reception ==
Mobile phone comparison website GSMArena commented on the Galaxy A17 LTE/5G, praising its build quality, OS upgrades and microSD card slot while criticising its low amount of memory and poor performance (for the version with 4GB of RAM) and display.

Preceded by Samsung Galaxy A16/A16 5G	Samsung Galaxy A17/A17 5G; 2025	Succeeded by Samsung Galaxy A18
