= Samsung Galaxy A series =

Mid-range series of smartphones by Samsung Electronics

- Galaxy A logo in 2019, without the Samsung logo

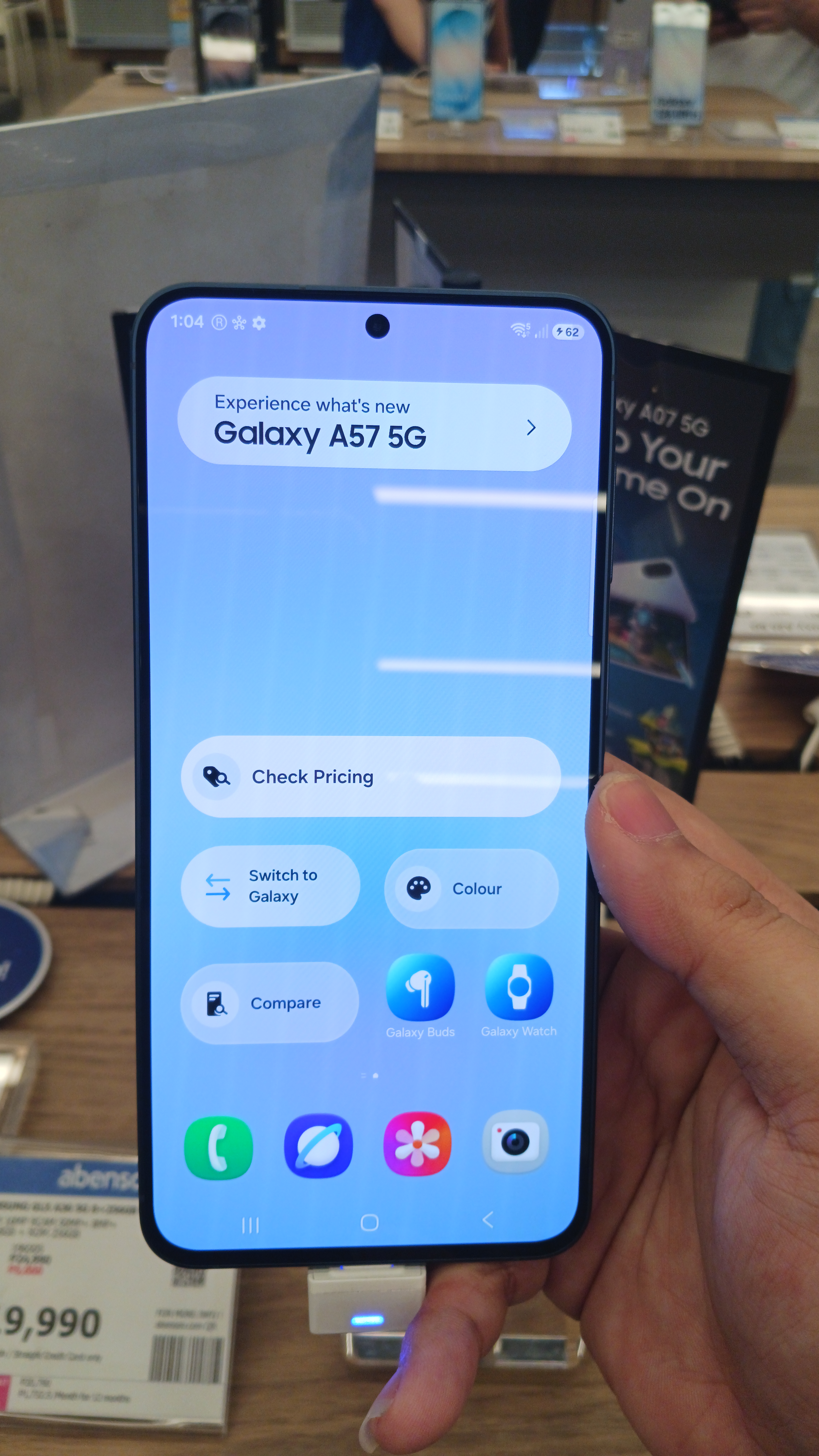
- The high-end mid-range model, Samsung Galaxy A57 5G
- Developer: Samsung Electronics
- Product family: Samsung Galaxy
- Type: Smartphones; Tablet computers
- Released: December 15, 2014; 11 years ago
- System on a chip: Samsung Exynos (2015–present); Qualcomm Snapdragon (2014–2016, 2018–present); MediaTek Dimensity (2019–present); UNISOC (2022)
- Predecessor: Samsung Galaxy Alpha; Samsung Galaxy S5 Mini; Samsung Galaxy J series (2015–2019)
- Related: Samsung Galaxy S series Samsung Galaxy Note; Samsung Galaxy Z series Samsung Galaxy Tab; Samsung Galaxy Tab S series Samsung Galaxy M series Samsung Galaxy F series

Galaxy A logo since 2015

The Samsung Galaxy A series is a line of entry-level and mid-range Android-based smartphones and tablets (and formerly premium mid-range devices before 2023) manufactured and developed by Samsung Electronics as part of their Galaxy line, succeeding both the Galaxy J series and the Galaxy S "mini" line and slotted below the flagship Galaxy S series. The first models in the series were the first-generation Galaxy A3 and Galaxy A5, announced on 31 October 2014, and released in December 2014.

Following the announcement of the 2017 series, Samsung announced that they hoped to sell up to 20 million Galaxy A series smartphones, targeting consumers in Europe, Africa, Asia, the Middle East, and Latin America.

As of 2026, most of the Galaxy A series models are available in most countries. Galaxy Tab A is also part of the A series and is available in most countries as well.

In the Galaxy A series, only the Galaxy A90 5G supports Samsung DeX. The Galaxy A80 is the only Samsung phone with no hole punch, notch, side cutout, or island that is featured on the Galaxy S10+, Huawei P40 Pro, and the iPhone 15, as the Galaxy A80 uses a motorized camera system which utilizes the rear cameras as a selfie camera.

== Phones ==
Legend:	Unsupported	Security only	Supported	Upcoming

=== Galaxy A (2015) ===
Samsung introduced the first generation Galaxy A series in October 2014, with the initial models launching two months later in December. Designed as Samsung's slimmest smartphones at the time, these devices brought premium features to the mid-range market, including an all-metal unibody construction, vibrant Super AMOLED displays, 4G LTE connectivity, Dual SIM, and expandable storage via a hybrid microSD slot. They also featured a 5MP selfie-optimized front camera equipped with social media-focused software like Animated GIF and Wide Selfie modes. This initial lineup was followed by two additional devices in 2015, notably the Galaxy A7 and Galaxy A8, which were released in February and July 2015, respectively.

Model		A3	A5	A7	A8
Support status		Unsupported			
Dates	Announced	31 October 2014		January 2015	August 2015
Dates	Released	December 2014		February 2015	August 2015
OS	Initial	TouchWiz Nature UX 3.5; Android 4.4.4			TouchWiz Essence UX 2.0; Android 5.1.1
OS	Latest	TouchWiz Nature UX 4.5; Android 6.0.1			TouchWiz Hero UX; Android 6.0.1
Dimensions mm (in)	Height	130.0 (5.12)	139.3 (5.48)	151 (5.9)	158 (6.2)
Dimensions mm (in)	Width	65.5 (2.58)	69.7 (2.74)	76.2 (3.00)	76.8 (3.02)
Dimensions mm (in)	Depth	6.9 (0.27)	6.7 (0.26)		5.9 (0.23)
Weight g (lb)		110.3 (0.243)	123 (0.271)		151 (0.333)
Colors					
Display	Size	4.5 in (110 mm)	5.0 in (130 mm)	5.5 in (140 mm)	5.7 in (140 mm)
Display	Resolution	540 x 960	720 x 1280	1080 x 1920	
Display	Refresh Rate	60 Hz			
Display	Type	Super AMOLED			
Front camera		5 MP			
Rear camera		8 MP	13 MP		16 MP
RAM		1 GB; 1.5 GB	2 GB		
Storage		16 GB			32 GB
Processor		Qualcomm; Snapdragon 410		Qualcomm; Snapdragon 615; Samsung; Exynos 5430 Octa	
Battery	Capacity (mAh)	1900	2300	2600	3050
Battery	Replaceable	No			
Battery	Fast Charging	No			
NFC		Yes			
IP rating		No			

=== Galaxy A (2016) ===
Samsung introduced the second generation Galaxy A series in December 2015, followed by the Galaxy A9 Pro and Galaxy A8 in March and September 2016, respectively. New features introduced in this generation include a metal and glass body, NFC and MST with Samsung Pay support, Samsung's Adaptive Fast Charging feature (up to 18W), and increased battery life. The Galaxy A series is similar to the flagship Galaxy S6 series and Galaxy Note 5, which were released in April 2015 and August 2015, respectively.

Model		A3	A5	A7	A8	A9	A9 Pro
Support status		Unsupported					
Dates	Announced	December 2015			September 2016	December 2015	March 2016
Dates	Released	December 2015			October 2016	January 2016	May 2016
OS	Initial	TouchWiz Essence UX 2.0; Android 5.1.1			TouchWiz Grace UX; Android 6.0.1	TouchWiz Essence UX 2.0; Android 5.1.1	TouchWiz Hero UX; Android 6.0.1
OS	Latest	Experience 8.0; Android 7.0			Experience 9.0; Android 8.0	TouchWiz Hero UX; Android 6.0.1	Experience 9.0; Android 8.0
Dimensions mm (in)	Height	134.5 (5.30)	144.8 (5.70)	151.5 (5.96)	156.6 (6.17)	161.7 (6.37)	
Dimensions mm (in)	Width	65.2 (2.57)	71 (2.8)	74.1 (2.92)	76.8 (3.02)	80.9 (3.19)	
Dimensions mm (in)	Depth	7.3 (0.29)			7.2 (0.28)	7.4 (0.29)	7.9 (0.31)
Weight g (lb)		132 (0.291)	155 (0.342)	172 (0.379)	200 (0.44)	210 (0.46)	182 (0.401)
Colors							
Display	Size	4.7 in (120 mm)	5.2 in (130 mm)	5.5 in (140 mm)	5.7 in (140 mm)	6.0 in (150 mm)	
Display	Resolution	720 x 1280	1080 x 1920				
Display	Refresh Rate	60 Hz					
Display	Type	Super AMOLED					
Front camera		5 MP			8 MP		
Rear cameras		13 MP			16 MP	13 MP	16 MP
RAM		1.5 GB	2 GB	3 GB	4 GB	3 GB	4 GB
Storage		16 GB			32 GB		
Processor		Samsung; Exynos 7578	Qualcomm; Snapdragon 615; Samsung; Exynos 7580		Samsung; Exynos 5420 Octa	Qualcomm; Snapdragon 652	
Battery	Capacity (mAh)	2300	2900	3300		4000	5000
Battery	Replaceable	No					
Battery	Fast Charging	No	18W		No		18W
NFC		Yes					
IP rating		No					

=== Galaxy A (2017) ===
In January 2017, Samsung unveiled the third generation of the Galaxy A series. Newly improved features include 16-megapixel front and back cameras, an Exynos 7 Octa 7880 SoC, a 3D glass display (similar to Galaxy S6 Edge+, Galaxy Note 5 and Galaxy S7), barometer and gyroscope sensors and IP68 certification for water and dust resistance as well as support for Gear 360 (2017). The new design of the series are similar to the Galaxy S7 and the S7 Edge, released in March 2016. The series comprises three models. This was the last Galaxy A series to use the TouchWiz user interface, before being superseded by Samsung Experience and One UI in later models. This is the oldest series to officially receive an update to One UI after a variant of this series' Galaxy A7 made for SK Telecom was updated in September 2019.

Model		A3	A5	A7
Support status		Unsupported		
Dates	Announced	January 2017		
Dates	Released	January 2017		
OS	Initial	TouchWiz Grace UX; Android 6.0.1		
OS	Latest	Experience 9.0; Android 8.0		
Dimensions mm (in)	Height	135.4 (5.33)	146.1 (5.75)	156.8 (6.17)
Dimensions mm (in)	Width	66.2 (2.61)	71.4 (2.81)	77.6 (3.06)
Dimensions mm (in)	Depth	7.9 (0.31)		
Weight g (lb)		138 (0.304)	157 (0.346)	186 (0.410)
Colors				
Display	Size	4.7 in (120 mm)	5.2 in (130 mm)	5.7 in (140 mm)
Display	Resolution	720 x 1280	1080 x 1920	
Display	Refresh Rate	60 Hz		
Display	Type	Super AMOLED		
Front camera		8 MP	16 MP	
Rear cameras		13 MP	16 MP	
RAM		2 GB	3 GB	
Storage		16 GB	32 GB; 64 GB	
Processor		Samsung; Exynos 7870 Octa	Samsung; Exynos 7880 Octa	
Battery	Capacity (mAh)	2350	3000	3600
Battery	Replaceable	No		
Battery	Fast Charging	No	18W	
NFC		Yes		
IP rating		IP68		

=== Galaxy A (2018) ===
Samsung introduced the 4th generation Galaxy A series in December 2017 with the A8 and A8+, followed by other variants throughout 2018, including the A6, A6+, A7, and A9. This marked a major expansion for the lineup and introduces many high-end features for the first time in the Galaxy A series, including multi-lens camera, Infinity Display, Adaptive Fast Charging (up to 18W), IP68 certification, and revamped design. The Galaxy A9 was the world's first smartphone equipped with a quad-camera setup. It was the first generation of Galaxy A devices that launched with the Samsung Experience UI derived from the Galaxy S9 series and Galaxy Note 9.

Model		A6	A6+	A6s	A7	A8	A8+	A8 Star	A8s	A9
Support status		Unsupported								
Dates	Announced	May 2018		October 2018	September 2018	December 2017		June 2018	December 2018	October 2018
Dates	Released	September 2018	May 2018		October 2018	January 2018		June 2018	December 2018	November 2018
OS	Initial	Experience 9.0; Android 8.0				Experience 8.5; Android 7.1.1		Experience 9.0; Android 8.0	Experience 9.5; Android 8.1	Experience 9.0; Android 8.0
OS	Latest	One UI 2.0; Android 10		Experience 9.0; Android 8	One UI 2.0; Android 10	One UI 1.0; Android 9		One UI 2.0; Android 10		
Dimensions mm (in)	Height	149.9 (5.90)	160.2 (6.31)	156.3 (6.15)	159.8 (6.29)	149.2 (5.87)	159.9 (6.30)	162.4 (6.39)	158.4 (6.24)	162.5 (6.40)
Dimensions mm (in)	Width	70.8 (2.79)	75.7 (2.98)	76.5 (3.01)	76.8 (3.02)	70.6 (2.78)	75.7 (2.98)	77.0 (3.03)	74.9 (2.95)	77.0 (3.03)
Dimensions mm (in)	Depth	7.7 (0.30)	7.9 (0.31)	8.4 (0.33)	7.5 (0.30)	8.4 (0.33)	8.3 (0.33)	7.6 (0.30)	7.4 (0.29)	7.8 (0.31)
Weight g (lb)		162 (0.357)	186 (0.410)	183 (0.403)	168 (0.370)	172 (0.379)	191 (0.421)		173 (0.381)	183 (0.403)
Colors										
Display	Size	5.6 in (140 mm)	6.0 in (150 mm)			5.6 in (140 mm)	6.0 in (150 mm)	6.3 in (160 mm)	6.4 in (160 mm)	6.3 in (160 mm)
Display	Resolution	720 x 1480	1080 x 2220	1080 x 2160	1080 x 2220				1080 x 2340	1080 x 2220
Display	Refresh Rate	60 Hz								
Display	Type	Super AMOLED							PLS LCD	Super AMOLED
Display	Camera cutout	—N/a							Infinity-O	—N/a
Front camera		16 MP	24 MP	12 MP	24 MP	16 MP + 8 MP		24 MP		
Rear cameras	Wide	16 MP		12 MP	24 MP	16 MP		24 MP + 16 MP	24 MP	
Rear cameras	Ultrawide	—N/a			8 MP	—N/a				8 MP
Rear cameras	Depth	—N/a	5 MP			—N/a			5 MP	
Rear cameras	Telephoto	—N/a							10 MP	
RAM		3 GB; 4 GB		6 GB	4 GB; 6 GB	4 GB	4 GB; 6 GB		6 GB; 8 GB	
Storage		32 GB; 64 GB		64 GB; 128 GB		32 GB; 64 GB	64 GB		128 GB	64 GB; 128 GB
Processor		Samsung; Exynos 7870 Octa	Qualcomm; Snapdragon 450	Qualcomm; Snapdragon 660	Samsung; Exynos 7885 Octa			Qualcomm; Snapdragon 660	Qualcomm; Snapdragon 710	Qualcomm; Snapdragon 660
Battery	Capacity (mAh)	3000	3500	3300		3000	3500	3700	3400	3800
Battery	Replaceable	No								
Battery	Fast Charging	No				18W		15W	18W	
Wi-Fi		802.11 a/b/g/n		802.11 a/b/g/n/ac						
NFC		Yes		No	Yes					
IP rating		No				IP68		No		

=== Galaxy Ax0 ===
Samsung introduced the 5th generation Galaxy A series in February 2019, alongside the online-exclusive Galaxy M series. This marked the complete refresh of the Galaxy A series, as the Galaxy J series was merged into the former. The series comprises the most numerous models of the Galaxy A series, with nineteen models. Key highlights in this generation include:

- Device names now uses the new two-digit nomenclature first introduced in the Galaxy M10, M20, M30 and S10
- waterdrop (Infinity U or Infinity V) notch display (also debuted in the Galaxy M series)
- higher battery capacities (above 4000mAh) with charging speeds of up to 25W
- newer SoCs and higher memory capacity
- return of the video stabilization feature (after it was removed from the Galaxy A 2017 series)
- the A90 being the only phone in the A series to feature DeX, and the first phone in the A series to have extended software support (3 OS upgrades and 4 years of security updates)
- the A80 being the only phone by Samsung to feature a completely bezel-less infinity display

Model		A2 Core	A10e	A10	A10s	A20e	A20	A20 Japan	A20s	A30	A30 Japan	A30s	A40	A50	A50s	A60	A70	A70s	A80	A90 5G
Support status		Unsupported																		
Dates	Announced	April 2019	July 2019	28 February 2019	12 August 2019	10 April 2019	19 March 2019	Unknown	24 September 2019	25 February 2019	Unknown	22 August 2019	19 March 2019	25 February 2019	22 August 2019	April 2019	26 March 2019	September 2019	10 April 2019	September 2019
Dates	Released	April 2019	August 2019	19 March 2019	27 August 2019	May 2019	5 April 2019	Unknown	5 October 2019	March 2019	Unknown	11 September 2019	April 2019	18 March 2019	September 2019	June 2019	1 May 2019	September 2019	May 2019	September 2019
OS	Initial	Experience 9.0; Android 8 Go	One UI 1.1; Android 9		One UI Core 1.1; Android 9	One UI 1.1; Android 9			One UI Core 1.1; Android 9	One UI 1.1; Android 9		One UI 1.5; Android 9	One UI 1.1; Android 9		One UI 1.5; Android 9	One UI 1.1; Android 9				One UI 1.5; Android 9
OS	Latest	Experience 9.5; Android 8.1 Go	One UI 3.1; Android 11		One UI Core 3.1; Android 11	One UI 3.1; Android 11			One UI Core 3.1; Android 11	One UI 3.1; Android 11										One UI 4.1; Android 12
OS	Support	—N/a	2 major Android updates																	3 major Android updates
Dimensions mm (in)	Height	141.6 (5.57)	147.3 (5.80)	155.6 (6.13)	156.9 (6.18)	147.4 (5.80)	158.4 (6.24)	150.0 (5.91)	163.3 (6.43)	158.5 (6.24)	160.0 (6.30)	158.5 (6.24)	144.4 (5.69)	158.5 (6.24)		155.3 (6.11)	164.3 (6.47)		165.2 (6.50)	164.8 (6.49)
Dimensions mm (in)	Width	71.0 (2.80)	69.6 (2.74)	75.6 (2.98)	75.8 (2.98)	69.7 (2.74)	74.7 (2.94)	71.0 (2.80)	77.5 (3.05)	74.7 (2.94)	75.0 (2.95)	74.7 (2.94)	69.2 (2.72)	74.7 (2.94)	74.5 (2.93)	73.9 (2.91)	76.7 (3.02)		76.5 (3.01)	76.4 (3.01)
Dimensions mm (in)	Depth	9.1 (0.36)	8.4 (0.33)	7.9 (0.31)	7.8 (0.31)	8.4 (0.33)	7.8 (0.31)	8.1 (0.32)	8.0 (0.31)	7.7 (0.30)	8.0 (0.31)	7.8 (0.31)	7.9 (0.31)	7.7 (0.30)		7.9 (0.31)			9.3 (0.37)	8.4 (0.33)
Weight g (lb)		142 (0.313)	141 (0.311)	168 (0.370)		141 (0.311)	169 (0.373)	151 (0.333)	183 (0.403)	165 (0.364)	176 (0.388)	166 (0.366)	140 (0.31)	166 (0.366)	169 (0.373)	168 (0.370)	183 (0.403)	187 (0.412)	220 (0.49)	206 (0.454)
Colors																				
Display	Size	5.0 in (130 mm)	5.8 in (150 mm)	6.2 in (160 mm)		5.8 in (150 mm)	6.4 in (160 mm)	5.8 in (150 mm)	6.5 in (170 mm)	6.4 in (160 mm)			5.9 in (150 mm)	6.4 in (160 mm)		6.3 in (160 mm)	6.7 in (170 mm)			
Display	Resolution	540 x 960	720 x 1560	720 x 1520		720 x 1560				1080 x 2340		720 x 1560	1080 x 2280	1080 x 2340			1080 x 2400			
Display	Refresh Rate	60 Hz																		
Display	Type	IPS LCD				PLS TFT	Super AMOLED	IPS LCD		Super AMOLED						PLS TFT LCD	Super AMOLED			
Display	Camera cutout	—N/a	Infinity-V							Infinity-U		Infinity-V	Infinity-U			Infinity-O	Infinity-U		New Infinity	Infinity-U
Front camera		5 MP	5 MP or 2 MP	5 MP	8 MP			5 MP or 2 MP	8 MP	16 MP	8 MP	16 MP	25 MP		32 MP				Back Camera	32 MP
Rear cameras	Wide	5 MP	8 MP or 5 MP	13 MP			13 MP or 5 MP	8 MP	13 MP	16 MP	13 MP	25 MP	16 MP	25 MP	48 MP	32 MP		64 MP	48 MP	
Rear cameras	Ultrawide	—N/a				5 MP			8 MP	5 MP		8 MP	5 MP	8 MP						
Rear cameras	Depth	—N/a			2 MP	—N/a			5 MP	—N/a		5 MP	—N/a	5 MP					—N/a	5 MP
RAM		1 GB	2 GB		2 GB; 3 GB	3 GB			3 GB; 4 GB				4 GB	4 GB; 6 GB		6 GB	6 GB; 8 GB		8 GB	6 GB; 8 GB
Storage		8 GB; 16 GB	32 GB						32 GB; 64 GB			32 GB; 64 GB; 128 GB	64 GB	64 GB; 128 GB			128 GB			
Processor		Samsung; Exynos 7870 Octa	Samsung; Exynos 7884 Octa		Mediatek; MT6762 Helio P22	Samsung; Exynos 7884 Octa	Samsung; Exynos 7884 Octa; Samsung; Exynos 7904 Octa	Samsung; Exynos 7884 Octa	Qualcomm; Snapdragon 450	Samsung; Exynos 7904 Octa				Samsung; Exynos 9610 Octa	Samsung; Exynos 9611 Octa	Qualcomm; Snapdragon 675			Qualcomm; Snapdragon 730	Qualcomm; Snapdragon 855
Battery	Capacity (mAh)	2600	3000	3400	4000	3000	4000	3000	4000		3900	4000	3100	4000		3500	4500		3700	4500
Battery	Replaceable	Yes	No																	
Battery	Fast Charging	No				15 W		No	15 W								25 W			
NFC		No				Yes			No	Yes						No	Yes			
IP rating		No						IP68	No		IP68	No								

=== Galaxy Ax1 ===
Samsung introduced the 6th generation Galaxy A series a few months after the release of mid-generation refresh of the 4th generation series (those with the "s" suffix), consisting of fourteen models. Key highlights in this generation include:

- Extended software support for A5x and A7x series (3 OS upgrades and 4 years of security updates)
- 5G models for the A5x and A7x series
- punch-hole (Infinity O) display for the A5x and A7x series

Model		A01 Core	A01	A11	A21 Japan	A21	A21s	A31	A41	A51	A51 5G	A51 5G UW	A71	A71 5G	A71 5G UW
Support status		Unsupported													
Dates	Announced	21 July 2020	17 December 2019	13 March 2020	Unknown	8 April 2020	15 May 2020	24 March 2020	18 March 2020	12 December 2019	8 April 2020	14 August 2020	12 December 2019	8 April 2020	7 July 2020
Dates	Released	6 August 2020	January 2020	1 May 2020	Unknown	26 June 2020	2 June 2020	27 April 2020	22 May 2020	16 December 2019	29 April 2020	14 August 2020	17 January 2020	15 June 2020	16 July 2020
OS	Initial	Android 10 Go	One UI Core 2.0; Android 10		One UI Core 2.1; Android 10			One UI 2.1; Android 10		One UI 2.0; Android 10	One UI 2.1; Android 10		One UI 2.0; Android 10	One UI 2.1; Android 10	
OS	Latest	Android 10 Go	One UI Core 4.1; Android 12					One UI 4.1; Android 12		One UI 5.1; Android 13					
OS	Support	—N/a	2 major Android updates							3 major Android updates					
Dimensions mm (in)	Height	141.7 (5.58)	146.3 (5.76)	161.4 (6.35)	149.7 (5.89)	167.8 (6.61)	163.6 (6.44)	159.3 (6.27)	149.9 (5.90)	158.5 (6.24)	158.9 (6.26)	158.8 (6.25)	163.6 (6.44)	162.5 (6.40)	162.8 (6.41)
Dimensions mm (in)	Width	67.5 (2.66)	70.1 (2.76)	76.3 (3.00)	70.7 (2.78)	76.7 (3.02)	75.3 (2.96)	73.1 (2.88)	69.8 (2.75)	73.6 (2.90)		73.4 (2.89)	76.0 (2.99)	75.5 (2.97)	75.7 (2.98)
Dimensions mm (in)	Depth	8.6 (0.34)	8.3 (0.33)	8.0 (0.31)	8.4 (0.33)	8.1 (0.32)	8.9 (0.35)	8.6 (0.34)	7.9 (0.31)		8.7 (0.34)	8.6 (0.34)	7.7 (0.30)	8.1 (0.32)	8.4 (0.33)
Weight g (lb)		150 (0.33)	149 (0.328)	177 (0.390)	159 (0.351)	193 (0.425)	192 (0.423)	185 (0.408)	152 (0.335)	172 (0.379)	187 (0.412)	189 (0.417)	179 (0.395)	185 (0.408)	188 (0.414)
Colors															
Display	Size	5.3 in (130 mm)	5.7 in (140 mm)	6.4 in (160 mm)	5.8 in (150 mm)	6.5 in (170 mm)		6.4 in (160 mm)	6.1 in (150 mm)	6.5 in (170 mm)			6.7 in (170 mm)		
Display	Resolution	720 x 1480	720 x 1560			720 x 1600		1080 x 2400							
Display	Refresh Rate	60 Hz													
Display	Type	PLS TFT				IPS LCD	PLS TFT	Super AMOLED							
Display	Camera cutout	Infinity	Infinity-V	Infinity-O	Infinity-V	Infinity-O		Infinity-U		Infinity-O					
Front camera		5 MP		8 MP	5 MP	13 MP		20 MP	25 MP	32 MP					
Rear cameras	Wide	8 MP	13 MP			16 MP	48 MP						64 MP		
Rear cameras	Ultrawide	—N/a		5 MP	—N/a	8 MP				12 MP					
Rear cameras	Macro	—N/a				2 MP		5 MP	—N/a	5 MP					
Rear cameras	Depth	—N/a	2 MP		—N/a	2 MP		5 MP							
RAM		1 GB; 2 GB	2 GB	2 GB; 3 GB	3 GB		3 GB; 4 GB; 6 GB	4 GB; 6 GB	4 GB	4 GB; 6 GB; 8 GB	6 GB; 8 GB	6 GB	6 GB; 8 GB		6 GB
Storage		16 GB; 32 GB		32 GB	64 GB	32 GB	32 GB; 64 GB; 128 GB	64 GB; 128 GB	64 GB	64 GB; 128 GB	128 GB				
Processor		MediaTek; MT6739WW	Qualcomm; Snapdragon 439	Qualcomm; Snapdragon 450	Samsung; Exynos 7884 Octa	MediaTek; Helio P35	Samsung; Exynos 850	MediaTek; Helio P65		Samsung; Exynos 9611	Samsung; Exynos 980	Qualcomm; Snapdragon 765G	Qualcomm; Snapdragon 730	Samsung; Exynos 980	Qualcomm; Snapdragon 765G
Battery	Capacity (mAh)	3000		4000	3600	4000	5000		3500	4000	4500				
Battery	Replaceable	No													
Battery	Fast Charging	No		15 W			15 W							25 W	
NFC		No			Yes	No		Yes							
IP rating		No			IP68	No			IP68	No	IP68	No			

=== Galaxy Ax2 ===
Samsung introduced the 7th generation Galaxy A series in September 2020, and consists of thirteen models. Key highlights in this generation include:

- introduction of 256 GB internal storage option for the A5x series
- OIS on the A5x and A7x
- re-introduction of the IP rating for the A5x and A7x series
- 120 Hz display for the A5x, A7x and A8x series
- A32 being the last model in the Galaxy A3x series to not receive extended software support (only 2 OS upgrades and 4 years of security updates)

Model		A02	A02s	A12	A22	A22 5G	A32	A32 5G	A42 5G	A52	A52 5G	A52s 5G	A72	A82 5G	
Support status		Unsupported													
Dates	Announced	27 January 2021	24 November 2020		3 June 2021	3 June 2021	25 February 2021	13 January 2021	2 September 2020	17 March 2021		17 August 2021	17 March 2021	13 April 2021	
Dates	Released	27 January 2021	4 January 2021	21 December 2020	1 July 2021	24 June 2021	25 February 2021	22 January 2021	11 November 2020	26 March 2021	19 March 2021	1 September 2021	26 March 2021	23 April 2021	
OS	Initial	One UI Core 2.5; Android 10			One UI Core 3.1; Android 11		One UI 3.1; Android 11		One UI 2.5; Android 10	One UI 3 Android 11		One UI 3.1; Android 11			
OS	Latest	One UI Core 3.1; Android 11	One UI Core 4.1; Android 12		One UI Core 5.1; Android 13		One UI 5.1; Android 13			One UI 6.1; Android 14					
OS	Support	1 major Android update	2 major Android updates							3 major Android updates					
Dimensions mm (in)	Height	164 (6.5)	164.2 (6.46)	164 (6.5)	159.3 (6.27)	167.2 (6.58)	158.9 (6.26)	164.2 (6.46)	164.4 (6.47)	159.9 (6.30)			165 (6.5)	161.9 (6.37)	
Dimensions mm (in)	Width	75.9 (2.99)		75.8 (2.98)	73.6 (2.90)	76.4 (3.01)	73.6 (2.90)	76.1 (3.00)	75.9 (2.99)	75.1 (2.96)			77.4 (3.05)	73.8 (2.91)	
Dimensions mm (in)	Depth	9.1 (0.36)		8.9 (0.35)	8.4 (0.33)	9.0 (0.35)	8.4 (0.33)	9.1 (0.36)	8.6 (0.34)	8.4 (0.33)				8.1 (0.32)	
Weight g (lb)		206 (0.454)	196 (0.432)	205 (0.452)	186 (0.410)	203 (0.448)	184 (0.406)	205 (0.452)	190 (0.42)	189 (0.417)			203 (0.448)	176 (0.388)	
Colors															
Display	Size	6.5 in (170 mm)			6.4 in (160 mm)	6.6 in (170 mm)	6.4 in (160 mm)	6.5 in (170 mm)	6.6 in (170 mm)	6.5 in (170 mm)			6.7 in (170 mm)		
Display	Resolution	720 x 1600				1080 x 2400		720 x 1600		1080 x 2400				1440 x 3200	
Display	Refresh Rate	60 Hz			90 Hz	90 Hz		60 Hz		90 Hz	120 Hz		90 Hz	120 Hz	
Display	Type	PLS			Super AMOLED	TFT	Super AMOLED	TFT	Super AMOLED						
Display	Camera cutout	Infinity-V			Infinity-U	Infinity-V	Infinity-U	Infinity-V	Infinity-U	Infinity-O					
Front camera		5 MP		8 MP	13 MP	8 MP	20 MP	13 MP	20 MP	32 MP				10 MP	
Rear cameras	Wide	13 MP		48 MP		48 MP	64 MP	48 MP		64 MP					
Rear cameras	Ultrawide	—N/a		5 MP	8 MP	5 MP	8 MP			12 MP					
Rear cameras	Macro	2 MP					5 MP								
Rear cameras	Depth	—N/a	2 MP			2 MP	5 MP	2 MP	5 MP				—N/a		
Rear cameras	Telephoto	—N/a												8 MP	—N/a
RAM		2 GB; 3 GB; 4 GB	1 GB; 2 GB; 3 GB; 4 GB	2 GB; 3 GB; 4 GB; 6 GB	4 GB; 6 GB	4 GB; 6 GB; 8 GB					6 GB; 8 GB			6 GB	
Storage		32 GB	32 GB; 64 GB	32 GB; 64 GB; 128 GB	64 GB; 128 GB	64 GB; 128 GB			128 GB	128 GB; 256 GB				128 GB	
Processor		MediaTek; MT6739W	Qualcomm; Snapdragon 450	MediaTek; Helio P35; Samsung; Exynos 850	MediaTek; Helio G80	MediaTek; Dimensity 700	MediaTek; Helio G80	MediaTek; Dimensity 720	Qualcomm; Snapdragon 750G	Qualcomm; Snapdragon 720G	Qualcomm; Snapdragon 750G	Qualcomm; Snapdragon 778G	Qualcomm; Snapdragon 720G	Qualcomm; Snapdragon 855+	
Battery	Capacity (mAh)	5000				5000				4500			5000	4500	
Battery	Replaceable	No													
Battery	Fast Charging	No	15 W			15 W				25 W					
NFC		No				No	Yes								
IP rating		No				No				IP67				No	

=== Galaxy Ax3 ===
Samsung introduced the 8th generation Galaxy A series in August 2021, and consists of ten models. Key highlights in this generation include:

- upgraded larger screens (on both LTE and 5G versions compared to the previous generation which was only reserved for 5G versions)
- the return of Exynos chipsets (for A33 and A53)
- return of the 5G A7x model
- support for 25W Fast Charging for the A2x and A3x series
- extended software support for the A3x, A5x, and A7x series (4 OS upgrades and 5 years of security updates)
- removal of the headset jack for the A3x, A5x, and A7x series
- IP rating for the A3x series
- Galaxy A23 being the last model in the Galaxy A2x series to not receive extended software support (only 2 OS upgrades and 4 years of security updates)

Unsupported

Model		A03 Core	A03	A03s	A13	A13 5G	A23	A23 5G	A33 5G	A53 5G	A73 5G
Support status		Unsupported							Security only		
Dates	Announced	15 November 2021	26 November 2021	18 August 2021	4 March 2022	2 December 2021	4 March 2022	5 August 2022	17 March 2022		
Dates	Released	6 December 2021	21 January 2022	18 August 2021	23 March 2022	3 December 2021	25 March 2022	2 September 2022	20 April 2022	24 March 2022	22 April 2022
OS	Initial	Android 11 Go	One UI Core 3.1; Android 11		One UI Core 4.1; Android 12	One UI Core 3.1; Android 11	One UI 4.1; Android 12				
OS	Latest	Android 13 Go	One UI Core 5.1; Android 13		One UI 6.1; Android 14				One UI 8.0; Android 16		
OS	Support	2 major Android updates							4 major Android updates		
Dimensions mm (in)	Height	164.2 (6.46)			165.1 (6.50)	164.5 (6.48)	165.4 (6.51)	165.4 (6.51)	159.7 (6.29)	159.6 (6.28)	163.7 (6.44)
Dimensions mm (in)	Width	75.9 (2.99)			76.4 (3.01)	76.5 (3.01)	76.9 (3.03)	76.9 (3.03)	74.0 (2.91)	74.8 (2.94)	76.1 (3.00)
Dimensions mm (in)	Depth	9.1 (0.36)			8.8 (0.35)		8.4 (0.33)	8.4 (0.33)	8.1 (0.32)		7.6 (0.30)
Weight g (lb)		211 (0.465)	196 (0.432)		195 (0.430)			197 (0.434)	186 (0.410)	189 (0.417)	181 (0.399)
Colors											
Display	Size	6.5 in (170 mm)			6.6 in (170 mm)	6.5 in (170 mm)	6.6 in (170 mm)	6.6 in (170 mm)	6.4 in (160 mm)	6.5 in (170 mm)	6.7 in (170 mm)
Display	Resolution	720 x 1600			1080 x 2408	720 x 1600	1080 x 2408	1080 x 2400			
Display	Refresh Rate	60 Hz				90 Hz		120 Hz	90 Hz	120 Hz	
Display	Type	PLS IPS			TFT LCD	PLS IPS	TFT LCD	PLS IPS	Super AMOLED		
Display	Camera cutout	Infinity-V							Infinity-U	Infinity-O	
Front camera		5 MP			8 MP	5 MP	8 MP	8 MP	13 MP	32 MP	
Rear cameras	Wide	8 MP	48 MP	13 MP	50 MP				48 MP	64 MP	108 MP
Rear cameras	Ultrawide	—N/a			5 MP	—N/a	5 MP	5 MP	8 MP	12 MP	
Rear cameras	Macro	—N/a		2 MP				2 MP	5 MP		
Rear cameras	Depth	—N/a	2 MP					2 MP		5 MP	
RAM		2 GB	3 GB; 4 GB	2 GB; 3 GB; 4 GB	3 GB; 4 GB; 6 GB	4 GB; 6 GB	4 GB; 6 GB; 8 GB	4 GB; 6 GB; 8 GB	6 GB; 8 GB		
Storage		32 GB	32 GB; 64 GB; 128 GB	32 GB; 64 GB	32 GB; 64 GB; 128 GB	64 GB; 128 GB		64 GB; 128 GB	128 GB; 256 GB		
Processor		Unisoc; SC9863A	Unisoc; T606	MediaTek; Helio P35	Samsung; Exynos 850; MediaTek; Helio G80	MediaTek; Dimensity 700	Qualcomm; Snapdragon 680	Qualcomm; Snapdragon 695	Samsung; Exynos 1280		Qualcomm; Snapdragon 778G
Battery	Capacity (mAh)	5000						5000			
Battery	Replaceable	No									
Battery	Fast Charging	No		15 W			25 W	25 W			
3.5 mm headphone jack		Yes								No	
NFC		No		Yes							
IP rating		No						No	IP67		

=== Galaxy Ax4 ===
Samsung introduced the 9th generation Galaxy A series in August 2022, and consists of eight models. Key highlights in this generation include:

- reintroduction of Super AMOLED display for the A2x series, 120 Hz refresh rate for the A3x series, 1080p display for the A1x Series
- reintroduction of back glass panel for the A5x series last seen on the final iteration of the Galaxy A8 series and A9 series
- extended software support for the A2x series (4 OS upgrades and 5 years of security updates)
- A14 being the last Galaxy A1x model to not receive extended software support (only 2 OS upgrades and 4 years of security updates)

These generation of the Galaxy A series also marked the last devices to support 32-bit ARMv7 applications, and the Galaxy A24 being the last device under the A2x series to be only released with LTE connectivity only.

Model		A04e	A04	A04s	A14	A14 5G	A24	A34 5G	A54 5G
Support status		Security only		Unsupported	Security only		Supported		
Dates	Announced	21 October 2022	24 August 2022	31 August 2022	27 February 2023	4 January 2023	19 April 2023	15 March 2023	
Dates	Released	7 November 2022	10 October 2022	22 September 2022	15 March 2023	12 January 2023	5 May 2023	24 March 2023	
OS	Initial	One UI Core 4.1; Android 12			One UI Core 5.0; Android 13		One UI 5.1; Android 13		
OS	Latest	One UI 6.1; Android 14			One UI 7 Android 15		One UI 9.0; Android 17		
OS	Support	2 major Android updates					4 major Android updates		
Dimensions mm (in)	Height	164.2 (6.46)	164.4 (6.47)	164.7 (6.48)	167.7 (6.60)		162.1 (6.38)	161.3 (6.35)	158.2 (6.23)
Dimensions mm (in)	Width	75.9 (2.99)	76.3 (3.00)	76.7 (3.02)	78 (3.1)		77.6 (3.06)	78.1 (3.07)	76.7 (3.02)
Dimensions mm (in)	Depth	9.1 (0.36)					8.3 (0.33)	8.2 (0.32)	
Weight g (lb)		188 (0.414)	192 (0.423)	195 (0.430)	201 (0.443)	202 (0.445)	195 (0.430)	199 (0.439)	202 (0.445)
Colors									
Display	Size	6.5 in (170 mm)			6.6 in (170 mm)		6.5 in (170 mm)	6.6 in (170 mm)	6.4 in (160 mm)
Display	Resolution	720 x 1600			1080 x 2408		1080 x 2340		
Display	Refresh Rate	60 Hz		90 Hz	60 Hz	90 Hz		120 Hz	
Display	Type	PLS LCD	PLS IPS	PLS LCD			Super AMOLED		
Display	Camera cutout	Infinity-V					Infinity-U		Infinity-O
Display	Glass	—N/a						Gorilla Glass 5	
Front camera		5 MP			13 MP				32 MP
Rear cameras	Wide	13 MP	50 MP					48 MP	50 MP
Rear cameras	Ultrawide	—N/a			5 MP	—N/a	5 MP	8 MP	12 MP
Rear cameras	Macro	—N/a		2 MP				5 MP	
Rear cameras	Depth	2 MP			—N/a	2 MP	—N/a	—N/a	
RAM		3 GB; 4 GB	4 GB; 6 GB; 8 GB	3 GB; 4 GB	4 GB; 6 GB		4 GB; 6 GB; 8 GB	6 GB; 8 GB	
Storage		32 GB; 64 GB; 128 GB			128 GB	64 GB; 128 GB	128 GB	128 GB; 256 GB	
Processor		MediaTek; Helio P35		Samsung; Exynos 850	MediaTek; Helio G80; Samsung; Exynos 850	MediaTek; Dimensity 700; Samsung; Exynos 1330	MediaTek; Helio G99	MediaTek; Dimensity 1080	Samsung; Exynos 1380
Battery	Capacity (mAh)	5000							
Battery	Replaceable	No							
Battery	Fast Charging	No	15 W				25 W		
3.5 mm headphone jack		Yes						No	
NFC		No		Yes					
IP rating		No						IP67	

=== Galaxy Ax5 ===
Samsung introduced the 10th generation Galaxy A series in September 2023, and consists of seven models. Key highlights in this generation include:

- Super AMOLED display for the first time on the A1x series, 120Hz refresh rate for the A2x series, punch-hole (Infinity O) display for the A3x series
- Super Fast Charging (25 W) on the lower-end models (A0x, A1x)
- "Key Island" design (except for the A0x line), reintroduction of the metal device frame (for the A5x series), punch-hole display and glass back (for the A3x series)
- Wider eSIM availability (for A3x and A5x series)
- 256 GB internal storage option for the A1x and A2x series, 12 GB RAM option for the A5x series
- extended software support for the A1x series, starting with the A15 (4 OS upgrades and 5 years of security updates)

While it introduced upgrades, this generation also marked several lasts, such as the A15 and A25 being the last devices (under the A1x and A2x series, respectively) to have the headphone jack, and the A35 and A55 being the last devices (under the A3x and A5x series, respectively) to have support for microSD cards. For the first time in this generation, A5x devices (specifically the A55) were not sold in the US.

Model		A05	A05s	A15	A15 5G	A25 5G	A35 5G	A55 5G
Support status		Security only		Supported				
Dates	Announced	25 September 2023		11 December 2023			11 March 2024	
Dates	Released	15 October 2023	18 October 2023	16 December 2023			15 March 2024	
OS	Initial	One UI Core 5.1; Android 13		One UI 6 Android 14			One UI 6.1; Android 14	
OS	Latest	One UI 7 Android 15		One UI 9.0; Android 17				
OS	Support	2 major Android updates		4 major Android updates				
Dimensions mm (in)	Height	168.8 (6.65)	168 (6.6)	160.1 (6.30)		161 (6.3)	161.7 (6.37)	161.1 (6.34)
Dimensions mm (in)	Width	78.2 (3.08)	77.8 (3.06)	76.8 (3.02)		76.5 (3.01)	78 (3.1)	77.4 (3.05)
Dimensions mm (in)	Depth	8.8 (0.35)		8.4 (0.33)		8.3 (0.33)	8.2 (0.32)	
Weight g (lb)		195 (0.430)	194 (0.428)	200 (0.44)		197 (0.434)	209 (0.461)	213 (0.470)
Colors								
Display	Size	6.7 in (170 mm)		6.5 in (170 mm)			6.6 in (170 mm)	
Display	Resolution	720 x 1600	1080 x 2400	1080 x 2340				
Display	Refresh Rate	60 Hz	90 Hz			120 Hz		
Display	Type	PLS LCD		Super AMOLED				
Display	Camera cutout	Infinity-U					Infinity-O	
Display	Glass	—N/a				Corning Gorilla Glass 5	Corning Gorilla Glass Victus+	
Front camera		8 MP	13 MP					32 MP
Rear cameras	Wide	50 MP						
Rear cameras	Ultrawide	—N/a		5 MP		8 MP		12 MP
Rear cameras	Macro	—N/a	2 MP				5 MP	
Rear cameras	Depth	2 MP		—N/a				
RAM		4 GB; 6 GB		4 GB; 6 GB; 8 GB		6 GB; 8 GB		8 GB; 12 GB
Storage		64 GB; 128 GB		128 GB; 256 GB				
Processor		MediaTek; Helio G85	Qualcomm; Snapdragon 680	MediaTek; Helio G99	MediaTek; Dimensity 6100+	Samsung; Exynos 1280	Samsung; Exynos 1380	Samsung; Exynos 1480
Battery	Capacity (mAh)	5000						
Battery	Replaceable	No						
Battery	Fast Charging	25 W						
3.5 mm headphone jack		Yes					No	
NFC		No		Yes				
IP rating		No					IP67	

=== Galaxy Ax6 ===
Samsung introduced the 11th generation Galaxy A series in August 2024, and consists of eight models. Key highlights in this generation include:

- Standardized hardware features (which includes the availability of the fingerprint scanner in all of its models and 6.7" display)
- 45W Super Fast Charging on the A3x and A5x series
- Extended software support for A0x series (starting with A06 5G; 4 OS upgrades and 4 years of security updates), and A16 and higher devices (6 OS upgrades and 6 years of security updates)

This series marks the last time that a device released under this generation would have a short software support (2 OS upgrades and 4 years of security updates) and have an eMMC storage as its storage type. However, this generation was the first time to remove the microSD slot starting with the A36 and A56 and the headphone jack starting with the A16 and A26.

Model		A06	A06 5G	A16	A16 5G	A26 5G	A36 5G	A56 5G
Support status		Security only	Supported					
Dates	Announced	16 August 2024	19 February 2025	15 October 2024	7 October 2024	2 March 2025		
Dates	Released	22 August 2024	19 February 2025	20 November 2024	25 October 2024	19 March 2025	10 March 2025	
OS	Initial	One UI 6.1; Android 14	One UI 7 Android 15	One UI 6.1; Android 14		One UI 7 Android 15		
OS	Latest	One UI 8 Android 16	One UI 9.0; Android 17					
OS	Support	2 major Android updates	4 major Android updates	6 major Android updates				
Dimensions mm (in)	Height	167.3 (6.59)		164.4 (6.47)		164 (6.5)	162.9 (6.41)	162.2 (6.39)
Dimensions mm (in)	Width	77.3 (3.04)		77.9 (3.07)		77.5 (3.05)	78.2 (3.08)	77.5 (3.05)
Dimensions mm (in)	Depth	8 (0.31)		7.9 (0.31)		7.7 (0.30)	7.4 (0.29)	
Weight g (lb)		189 (0.417)	191 (0.421)	200 (0.44)			195 (0.430)	198 (0.437)
Colors								
Display	Size	6.7 in (170 mm)						
Display	Resolution	720 x 1600		1080 x 2340				
Display	Refresh Rate	60 Hz	90 Hz			120 Hz		
Display	Type	PLS LCD		Super AMOLED				
Display	Camera cutout	Infinity-U					Infinity-O	
Display	Glass	—N/a				Corning Gorilla Glass Victus+		
Front camera		8 MP		13 MP			12 MP	
Rear cameras	Wide	50 MP						
Rear cameras	Ultrawide	—N/a		5 MP		8 MP		12 MP
Rear cameras	Macro	—N/a		2 MP			5 MP	
Rear cameras	Depth	2 MP		—N/a				
RAM		4 GB; 6 GB		4 GB; 6 GB; 8 GB		6 GB; 8 GB	6 GB; 8 GB; 12 GB	8 GB; 12 GB
Storage		64 GB; 128 GB		128 GB; 256 GB				
Processor		MediaTek; Helio G85	MediaTek; Dimensity 6300	MediaTek; Helio G99	Samsung; Exynos 1330; MediaTek; Dimensity 6300	Samsung; Exynos 1280; Samsung; Exynos 1380	Qualcomm; Snapdragon 6 Gen 3	Samsung; Exynos 1580
Battery	Capacity (mAh)	5000						
Battery	Replaceable	No						
Battery	Fast Charging	25 W					45 W	
3.5 mm headphone jack		Yes		No				
NFC		No		Yes				
IP rating		No	IP54			IP67		

=== Galaxy Ax7 ===
Samsung introduced the 12th generation Galaxy A series in August 2025, and consists of seven models. Key highlights in this generation include:

- the introduction of OIS camera for the A1x series, punch-hole (Infinity O) display for the A2x series
- extended software support for the A0x series (6 OS upgrades and 6 years of security updates)
- introduction of the 256 GB (for the A0x series) and 512 GB (for the A5x series) internal storage options
- reintroduction of the IP68 rating last seen on Galaxy A8 and A8+ (for the A3x and A5x series)

This series marks the first time that all devices in the lineup now feature UFS storage, with the Galaxy A07 becoming the first in the A0x series to include this faster storage type. This is a shift from previous generations, where at least one Galaxy A series device still relied on the older eMMC storage.

Model		A07	A07s	A07 5G	A17	A17 5G	A27 5G	A37 5G	A57 5G
Support status		Supported							
Dates	Announced	23 August 2025	7 September 2026	12 January 2026	18 September 2025	6 August 2025	25 June 2026	25 March 2026	
Dates	Released	23 August 2025	7 September 2026	12 January 2026	18 September 2025	18 August 2025	3 July 2026	10 April 2026	
OS	Initial	One UI 7 Android 15	One UI 8.5; Android 16	One UI 8 Android 16	One UI 7 Android 15		One UI 8.5; Android 16		
OS	Latest	One UI 9.0; Android 17							
OS	Support	6 major Android updates							
Dimensions mm (in)	Height	167.4 (6.59)			164.4 (6.47)		162.4 (6.39)	162.9 (6.41)	161.5 (6.36)
Dimensions mm (in)	Width	77.4 (3.05)			77.9 (3.07)		78.2 (3.08)	78.2 (3.08)	76.8 (3.02)
Dimensions mm (in)	Depth	7.6 (0.30)		8.2 (0.32)	7.5 (0.30)		7.8 (0.31)	7.4 (0.29)	6.9 (0.27)
Weight g (lb)		184 (0.406)		199 (0.439)	190 (0.42)	192 (0.423)	200 (0.44)	196 (0.432)	179 (0.395)
Colors									
Display	Size	6.7 in (170 mm)							
Display	Resolution	720 x 1600			1080 x 2340				
Display	Refresh Rate	90 Hz		120 Hz	90 Hz		120 Hz		
Display	Type	PLS LCD			Super AMOLED				Super AMOLED+
Display	Camera cutout	Infinity-U					Infinity-O		
Display	Glass	—N/a			Corning Gorilla Glass Victus		Corning Gorilla Glass Victus+		
Front camera		8 MP			13 MP		12MP		
Rear cameras	Wide	50 MP							
Rear cameras	Ultrawide	—N/a			5 MP			8 MP	12 MP
Rear cameras	Macro	—N/a			2 MP			5 MP	
Rear cameras	Depth	2 MP			—N/a				
RAM		4 GB; 6 GB; 8 GB			4 GB; 6 GB; 8 GB		6 GB; 8 GB	6 GB; 8 GB; 12 GB	8 GB; 12 GB
Storage		64 GB; 128 GB; 256 GB			128 GB; 256 GB				128 GB; 256 GB; 512 GB
Processor		MediaTek; Helio G99	MediaTek; Helio G99+	MediaTek; Dimensity 6300	MediaTek; Helio G99	Samsung; Exynos 1330	Qualcomm; Snapdragon 6 Gen 3	Samsung; Exynos 1480	Samsung; Exynos 1680
Battery	Capacity (mAh)	5000		6000	5000				
Battery	Replaceable	No							
Battery	Fast Charging	25 W						45 W	
3.5 mm headphone jack		Yes			No				
NFC		No			Yes				
IP rating		IP54					IP64	IP68	

=== Galaxy Ax8 ===
Samsung introduced the 13th generation Galaxy A series in September 2026.

Model		A08	A18
Support status		Supported	
Dates	Announced	15 September 2026	
Dates	Released	15 September 2026	
OS	Initial	One UI 9 Android 17	
OS	Latest	One UI 9 Android 17	
OS	Support	6 major Android updates	
Dimensions mm (in)	Height	167.4 (6.59)	164.4 (6.47)
Dimensions mm (in)	Width	77.4 (3.05)	77.9 (3.07)
Dimensions mm (in)	Depth	8.0 (0.31)	7.7 (0.30)
Weight g (lb)		197 (0.434)	196 (0.432)
Colors			
Display	Size	6.7 in (170 mm)	
Display	Resolution	720 x 1600	1080 x 2340
Display	Refresh Rate	90 Hz	
Display	Type	PLS LCD	Super AMOLED
Display	Camera cutout	Infinity-U	
Display	Glass	—N/a	Corning Gorilla Glass 3
Front camera		8 MP	13 MP
Rear cameras	Wide	50 MP	
Rear cameras	Ultrawide	—N/a	5 MP
Rear cameras	Macro	—N/a	2 MP
Rear cameras	Depth	2 MP	—N/a
RAM		4 GB; 6 GB; 8 GB	
Storage		64 GB; 128 GB; 256 GB	
Processor		MediaTek; Helio G99	Samsung; Exynos 1610
Battery	Capacity (mAh)	6000	5000
Battery	Replaceable	No	
Battery	Fast Charging	25 W	
3.5 mm headphone jack		Yes	No
NFC		No	Yes
IP rating		IP64	

== Tablets ==
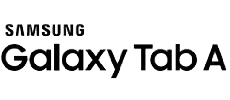
Galaxy Tab A logo in 2015

In March 2015, Samsung introduced the Galaxy Tab A series with 8.0 inch and 9.7 inch displays, a S Pen stylus, as well as preloaded Samsung applications. The S Pen feature on the Galaxy Tab A series, makes the first Samsung Galaxy device to be equipped with the Samsung stylus outside of the Note series. Succeeding Tab A models didn't have the S Pen feature to reposition its series to the budget line-up. A kids edition was also made available in select countries, starting with the Galaxy Tab A9 series, which included a stylus. Since the release of the Galaxy Tab A11/A11+ in September 2025, software support for those tablets now match with those of the Galaxy Tab S lineup, supporting up to 7 years of operating system and security updates.

=== Galaxy Tab A 8" series ===
Model		A 8.0 (2015)	A 8.0 (2017)	A 8.0 (2018)	A 8.0 (2019)	A 8.4 (2020)	A7 Lite	A9	A11
Support status		Unsupported						Security only	Supported
Dates	Announced	March 2015	September 2017	September 2018	5 July 2019	25 March 2020	27 May 2021	5 October 2023	15 September 2025
Dates	Released	May 2015	September 2017	September 2018	July 2019	25 March 2020	18 June 2021	5 October 2023	15 September 2025
OS	Initial	TouchWiz Zero UX; Android 5	Experience 8.5; Android 7.1	Experience 9.5; Android 8.1	One UI 1.1; Android 9	One UI 2.0; Android 10	One UI 3.1; Android 11	One UI 5.1.1; Android 13	One UI 7.0; Android 15
OS	Latest	Experience 8.5; Android 7.1.1	One UI 1.5; Android 9	One UI 2.5; Android 10	One UI 3.1.1; Android 11	One UI 4.1.1; Android 12	One UI 6.1; Android 14	One UI 8.0; Android 16	One UI 8.5; Android 16
OS	Support	2 major Android updates					3 major Android updates		7 major Android updates
Dimensions mm (in)	Height	208.3 (8.20)	212.1 (8.35)	206.6 (8.13)	210 (8.3)	202 (8.0)	212.5 (8.37)	211 (8.3)	
Dimensions mm (in)	Width	137.9 (5.43)	124.1 (4.89)	126.7 (4.99)	124.4 (4.90)	125.2 (4.93)	124.7 (4.91)		
Dimensions mm (in)	Depth	7.4 (0.29)	8.9 (0.35)		8 (0.31)	7.1 (0.28)	8 (0.31)		
Weight g (lb)		313 (0.690)	364 (0.802)	359 (0.791)	345 (0.761)	309 (0.681)	366 (0.807)	332 (0.732)	335 (0.739)
Colors									
Display	Size	8.0 in (200 mm)				8.4 in (210 mm)	8.7 in (220 mm)		
Display	Resolution	768 x 1024	800 x 1280			1200 x 1920	800 x 1340		
Display	Aspect Ratio	4:3	16:10				5:3		
Display	Refresh Rate	60 Hz							90 Hz
Display	Type	TFT	IPS LCD		TFT				
Connectivity	Wi-Fi	W-Fi 4			Wi-Fi 5				
Connectivity	Cellular	3G/LTE	4G/LTE	LTE		LTE	LTE		
Connectivity	Bluetooth	4.0	4.2		5.0			5.3	
Connectivity	Positioning	GPS, GLONASS	Adds; BDS	Drops; BDS	Adds; GALILEO, BDS	Drops; GALILEO, BDS	Adds; GALILEO, BDS	Adds; QZSS	
Connectivity	MicroSD	Yes							
Connectivity	3.5 mm headphone jack	Yes							
Connectivity	USB	Micro-USB 2.0	USB-C 2.0	Micro-USB 2.0	USB-C 2.0				
Connectivity	NFC	No							
Front camera		2 MP	5 MP	2 MP	5 MP		2 MP		5 MP
Rear cameras		5 MP	8 MP	5 MP	8 MP				
RAM		1.5 GB; 2 GB	2 GB		3 GB		2 GB; 3 GB; 4 GB	4 GB; 8 GB	
Storage		16 GB; 32 GB		32 GB			32 GB; 64 GB	64 GB; 128 GB	
Processor		Samsung; Exynos 5433	Qualcomm; Snapdragon 425		Qualcomm; Snapdragon 429	Samsung; Exynos 7904	MediaTek; Helio P22T	MediaTek; Helio G99	
Battery	Capacity (mAh)	4200	5000		4200	5000	5100		
Battery	Replaceable	No							
Battery	Fast Charging	No					15 W		
IP rating		No							

=== Galaxy Tab A 9"/10"/11" series ===
Model		A 9.7	A 10.1	A 10.5	A 10.1 (2019)	A7		A8	A9+	A11+
Support status		Unsupported							Security only	Supported
Dates	Announced	March 2015	May 2016	August 2018	15 February 2019	2 September 2020	18 November 2022	15 December 2021	5 October 2023	29 September 2025
Dates	Released	May 2015	May 2016	August 2018	April 2019	11 September 2020	21 November 2022	17 January 2022	17 October 2023	2 November 2025
OS	Initial	TouchWiz Zero UX; Android 5	TouchWiz Hero UX; Android 6	Experience 9.5; Android 8.1	One UI 1.1; Android 9	One UI 2.5; Android 10	One UI 4.1; Android 12	One UI 3.1.1; Android 11	One UI 5.1.1; Android 13	One UI 8.0; Android 16
OS	Latest	Experience 9.0; Android 8	Experience 9.5; Android 8.1	One UI 2.5; Android 10	One UI 3.1.1; Android 11	One UI 4.1; Android 12		One UI 6.1.1; Android 14	One UI 8.0; Android 16	One UI 8.5; Android 16
OS	Support	2 major Android updates					—N/a	3 major Android updates		7 major Android updates
Dimensions mm (in)	Height	242.5 (9.55)	254.2 (10.01)	260 (10)	245.2 (9.65)	247.6 (9.75)		246.8 (9.72)	257.1 (10.12)	
Dimensions mm (in)	Width	166.8 (6.57)	155.3 (6.11)	161.1 (6.34)	149.4 (5.88)	157.4 (6.20)		161.9 (6.37)	168.7 (6.64)	
Dimensions mm (in)	Depth	7.5 (0.30)	8.2 (0.32)	8 (0.31)	7.5 (0.30)	7 (0.28)		6.9 (0.27)		
Weight g (lb)		450 (0.99)	525 (1.157)	529 (1.166)	469 (1.034)	476 (1.049)	477 (1.052)	508 (1.120)	480 (1.06)	477 (1.052)
Colors										
Display	Size	9.7 in (250 mm)	10.1 in (260 mm)	10.5 in (270 mm)	10.1 in (260 mm)	10.1 in (260 mm)		10.5 in (270 mm)	11 in (280 mm)	
Display	Resolution	768 x 1024	1200 x 1920			1200 x 2000		1200 x 1920		
Display	Aspect Ratio	4:3	16:10			5:3		16:10		
Display	Refresh Rate	60 Hz							90 Hz	
Display	Type	TFT	PLS LCD	IPS LCD	TFT LCD					
Connectivity	Wi-Fi	W-Fi 4	Wi-Fi 5							
Connectivity	Cellular	LTE					LTE	LTE	LTE/5G	
Connectivity	Bluetooth	4.1	4.2		5.0				5.1	5.3
Connectivity	Positioning	GPS, GLONASS	Adds; Beidou	Adds; BDS	Adds; GALILEO			Adds; QZSS		
Connectivity	MicroSD	Yes								
Connectivity	3.5 mm headphone jack	Yes								
Connectivity	USB	Micro-USB 2.0		USB-C 2.0						
Connectivity	NFC	No								
Front camera		2 MP		5 MP						
Rear cameras		5 MP	8 MP							
RAM		1.5 GB; 2 GB	2 GB; 3 GB	3 GB	2 GB; 3 GB	3 GB; 4 GB		2 GB; 3 GB; 4 GB	4 GB; 8 GB	6 GB; 8 GB
Storage		16 GB; 32 GB		32 GB	16 GB; 32 GB; 64 GB; 128 GB	32 GB; 64 GB		32 GB; 64 GB; 128 GB	64 GB; 128 GB	128 GB; 256 GB
Processor		Snapdragon 810	Samsung; Exynos 7870	Qualcomm; Snapdragon 450	Samsung; Exynos 7904	Qualcomm; Snapdragon 662	Unisoc; T618	Unisoc; Tiger T618	Qualcomm; Snapdragon 695	MediaTek; Dimensity 7300
DeX		No							Yes	
Battery	Capacity (mAh)	6000	7300		6150	7040				
Battery	Replaceable	No								
Battery	Fast Charging	No		10 W	No	15 W				25 W
IP rating		No								IP 52

=== Other tablets ===
==== Galaxy Tab A 7.0 (2016) ====
Model		A 7.0 (2016)
Support status		Unsupported
Dates	Announced	March 2016
Dates	Released	March 2016
OS	Initial	TouchWiz Noble UX; Android 5
OS	Latest	TouchWiz Noble UX; Android 5
Dimensions mm (in)	Height	186.9 (7.36)
Dimensions mm (in)	Width	108.8 (4.28)
Dimensions mm (in)	Depth	8.7 (0.34)
Weight g (lb)		283 (0.624)
Colors		
Display	Size	7.0 in (180 mm)
Display	Resolution	800 x 1280
Display	Aspect ratio	16:10
Display	Refresh rate	60 Hz
Display	Type	IPS LCD
Connectivity	Wi-Fi	Wi-Fi 4
Connectivity	Cellular	LTE
Connectivity	Bluetooth	4.0, A2DP
Connectivity	Positioning	GLONASS, GPS
Connectivity	MicroSD	Yes
Connectivity	3.5 mm headphone jack	Yes
Connectivity	USB	Micro-USB 2.0
Connectivity	NFC	No
Front camera		2 MP
Rear camera		5 MP
RAM		1.5 GB
Storage		8 GB
Processor		Qualcomm; Snapdragon 410
Battery	Capacity (mAh)	4000
Battery	Replaceable	No
Battery	Fast Charging	No
IP rating		No
