= Samsung Galaxy A07 =

2025 Android smartphones manufactured by Samsung Electronics

Samsung Galaxy A07 (LTE) Samsung Galaxy A07 5G Samsung Galaxy A07s
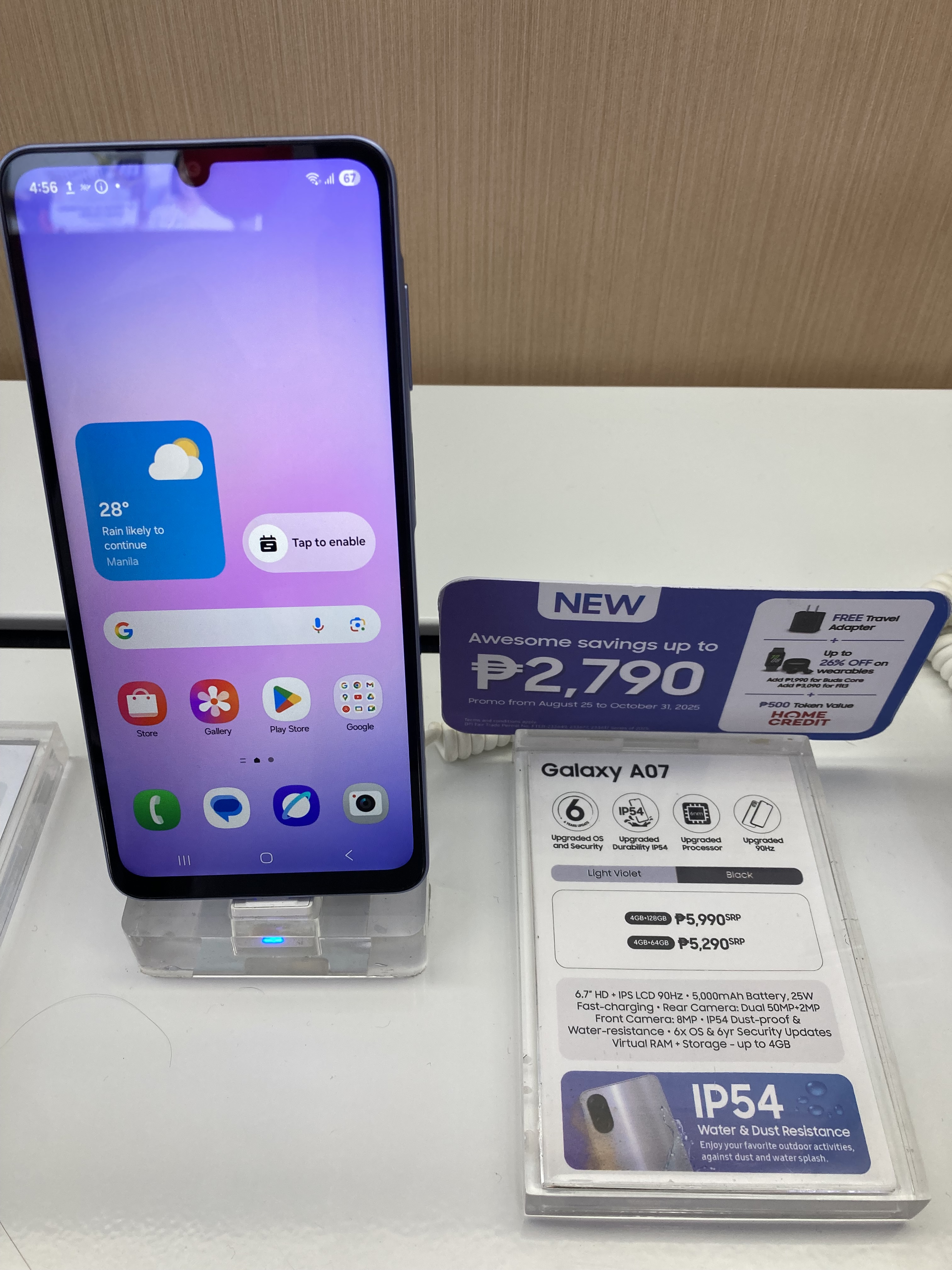
- Samsung Galaxy A07
- Also sold as: Galaxy A07s; Galaxy M07; Galaxy F07; Galaxy F70e 5G; Galaxy M17e 5G
- Brand: Samsung
- Manufacturer: Samsung Electronics
- Type: Smartphone
- Series: Galaxy A
- Family: Samsung Galaxy
- First released: A07: August 25, 2025; 14 months ago A07s: September 7, 2026; 59 days ago M07/F07: October 6, 2025; 12 months ago A07 5G: January 12, 2026; 9 months ago F70e 5G: February 9, 2026; 8 months ago M17e 5G: March 17, 2026; 7 months ago
- Availability by region: A07: August 25, 2025; 14 months ago M07/F07: October 6, 2025; 12 months ago A07 5G: January 13, 2026; 9 months ago F70e 5G: February 17, 2026; 8 months ago M17e 5G: March 17, 2026; 7 months ago
- Predecessor: Samsung Galaxy A06/A06 5G
- Successor: Samsung Galaxy A08
- Related: Samsung Galaxy A17; Samsung Galaxy A27 5G; Samsung Galaxy A37 5G; Samsung Galaxy A57 5G
- Compatible networks: List: 2G bands: GSM 850 / 900 / 1800 / 1900; 3G bands: HSDPA 850 / 900 / 1700(AWS) / 1900 / 2100; 4G bands (LTE): 1, 2, 3, 4, 5, 7, 8, 12, 17, 20, 26, 28, 38, 40, 41, 66; 5G bands (5G models only): 1, 3, 5, 7, 8, 26, 28, 40, 41, 66, 77, 78 SA/NSA/Sub6
- Form factor: Slate
- Colors: Gray, Light Violet, Dark Green (LTE models only), Light Green (5G model only)
- Dimensions: LTE models: 167.4 mm (6.59 in) H 77.4 mm (3.05 in) W 7.6 mm (0.30 in) D 5G models: 167.4 mm (6.59 in) H 77.4 mm (3.05 in) W 8.2 mm (0.32 in) D
- Weight: LTE models: 184 g (6.5 oz); 5G models: 199 g (7.0 oz)
- Operating system: Original: LTE versions (except A07s): Android 15 with One UI 7.0; A07s: Android 16 with One UI 8.5; 5G versions: Android 16 with One UI 8.0; Current: F70e 5G and M17e 5G only: Android 16 with One UI 8.5; All (except F70e 5G and M17e 5G): Android 17 with One UI 9.0
- System-on-chip: LTE models: MediaTek Helio G99 (6 nm); 5G models: MediaTek Dimensity 6300 (6nm)
- CPU: LTE models: Octa-core (2x2.2 GHz Cortex-A76 & 6x2.0 GHz Cortex-A55); 5G models: Octa-core (2x2.4 GHz Cortex-A76 & 6x2.0 GHz Cortex-A55)
- GPU: LTE models: Mali-G57 MC2; 5G models: Mali-G57 MP2
- Memory: 4, 6, 8 GB
- Storage: 64, 128, 256 GB
- Removable storage: Yes, up to 2 TB
- SIM: Dual nano-SIM
- Battery: LTE models: 5000 mAh; 5G models: 6000 mAh
- Charging: 25W Super Fast Charging
- Rear camera: Dual-Camera Setup; Primary: Samsung ISOCELL (S5K)JN1; 50 MP, f/1.8, 26mm, 1/2.76", 0.64μm, PDAF; Depth: GalaxyCore GC02M1B; 2 MP, f/2.4, 1/5.0", 1.75μm Camera features: LED flash Video recording: 1080p@30/60fps
- Front camera: GalaxyCore GC08A8; 8 MP, f/2.0, 26mm (wide), 1/4.0", 1.12μm Video recording: 1080p@30fps
- Display: 6.7 in (170 mm); 720 x 1600 px resolution, 20:9 ratio (~262 ppi density); PLS LCD, 90Hz (LTE models)/120Hz (5G models)
- Sound: Loudspeaker, 3.5 mm auxiliary (headphone jack)
- Connectivity: Wi-Fi 802.11 a/b/g/n/ac, dual-band, Wi-Fi Direct; Bluetooth 5.3, A2DP, LE
- Data inputs: Multi-touch screen; USB Type-C 2.0; Fingerprint scanner (side-mounted); Accelerometer; Proximity sensor
- Water resistance: IP54 dust protected and water resistant (water splashes)
- Model: SM-A075x (A07 LTE); SM-A077x (A07s); SM-A076x (A07 5G); SM-M075x (M07); SM-E075x (F07); SM-E076x (F70e 5G); SM-M076x (M17e 5G) (last letter varies by carrier and international models)
- Website: UAE Website of A07 UAE Website of A07s UAE Website of Galaxy A07 5G
- References: "Samsung Galaxy A07 5g". GSMArea. "Samsung Galaxy A07 4g". GSMArea. "Samsung Galxy A07s". GSMArea.

The Samsung Galaxy A07 is an entry-level Android-based smartphone manufactured, developed and marketed by Samsung Electronics, as part of its Galaxy A series. It was announced on August 25, 2025 and released on the same date, while its 5G version was announced on January 12, 2026.

There were also several rebranded versions of the device: the Galaxy M07 and the Galaxy F07 (both of which were launched on October 6, 2025), the Galaxy F70e 5G (launched on February 9, 2026), and the Galaxy M17e (launched on March 17, 2026). A re-released variant of the LTE variant was also quietly released, known as the Galaxy A07s, on September 7, 2026, with the only difference being the pre-installed Android version (Android 16).

== Specifications ==
=== Design ===
The build has a glass front, plastic back and plastic frame. It is the first A0x/M0x/F0x series device to have a IP54 certification.

Galaxy A07 LTE Galaxy A07s Galaxy M07 Galaxy F07	Galaxy A07 5G	Galaxy F70e 5G	Galaxy M17e 5G
Black; Light Violet; Dark Green	Black; Light Violet; Light Green	Limelight Green; Spotlight Blue	Blitz Blue; Vibe Violet

=== Hardware ===
The devices are equipped with GSM, HSPA, LTE, 5G (for the 5G models only), Wi-Fi 802.11 a/b/g/n/ac dual-band, Wi-Fi Direct, Bluetooth 5.3 with A2DP and LE. It has FM Radio. It has USB Type-C 2.0 with 3.5mm jack.

==== Display ====
Like its predecessor, both variants have a 6.7-inch touchscreen, with PLS LCD, Infinity-U, and HD+ (720 x 1600 pixels) resolution. What sets the two variants apart are the refresh rates: 90 Hz refresh rate for the LTE variants (an upgrade from the A06 LTE, which only had 60 Hz) and 120 Hz refresh rate for the 5G variants (an upgrade from the A06 5G, which only had 90 Hz; a first for the overall Galaxy A0x series).

==== Battery ====
The LTE variants has a 5000 mAh battery, while the 5G variants has a 6000 mAh battery (the latter being a first for the overall Galaxy A/M/F series). Both variants support 25W Super fast charging.

==== Performance ====
The LTE variants uses the MediaTek Helio G99 chipset, while the 5G variants uses the MediaTek Dimensity 6300 chipset (similar to the A06 5G).

For the first time in the Galaxy A0x series, the LTE and 5G variants now introduces an 8 GB RAM and 256 GB internal storage option, alongside the existing 4 GB/64 GB, 4 GB/128 GB, and 6 GB/128 GB RAM and storage combinations.

All variants continue to have expandable storage supported up to 2 TB. Also a first in the series, UFS 2.2 is now used for its internal storage (for both the LTE and 5G variants) as opposed to the eMMC 5.1 used on its predecessor.

==== Camera ====
For all variants, the rear camera uses the same dual camera setup from its predecessor: 50 MP main camera and 2 MP depth camera. The front camera also uses the same 8 MP single camera, capable of recording up to 1080p at 30 fps.

=== Software ===
The LTE variants come with the Android 15 and One UI 7 pre-installed, while the 5G variants comes with the Android 16 and One UI 8 pre-installed. For the first time in the A0x/M0x/F0x series, all variants are set to receive 6 Android OS upgrades and 6 years of security updates (which will end in August 2031 for the LTE variants (except for the A07s) and within 2032 for the 5G variants).

	Pre-installed OS	OS Upgrades history						End of support
	Pre-installed OS	1st	2nd	3rd	4th	5th	6th	End of support
A07 LTE	Android 15 (One UI 7.0)	Android 16 (One UI 8.0); November 2025 (One UI 8.5); May 2026	Android 17 (One UI 9.0); October 2026					August 2031
M07; F07	Android 15 (One UI 7.0)	Android 16 (One UI 8.0); November 2025	Android 17 (One UI 9.0); October 2026					August 2031
A07s	Android 16 (One UI 8.5)	Android 17 (One UI 9.0); November 2026						Within 2032
A07 5G	Android 16 (One UI 8.0) Minor One UI update: (One UI 8.5); May 2026	Android 17 (One UI 9.0); November 2026						Within 2032
F70e 5G	Android 16 (One UI 8.0) Minor One UI update: (One UI 8.5); May 2026							Within 2032
M17e 5G	Android 16 (One UI 8.0) Minor One UI update: (One UI 8.5); May 2026							Within 2032

== Gallery ==
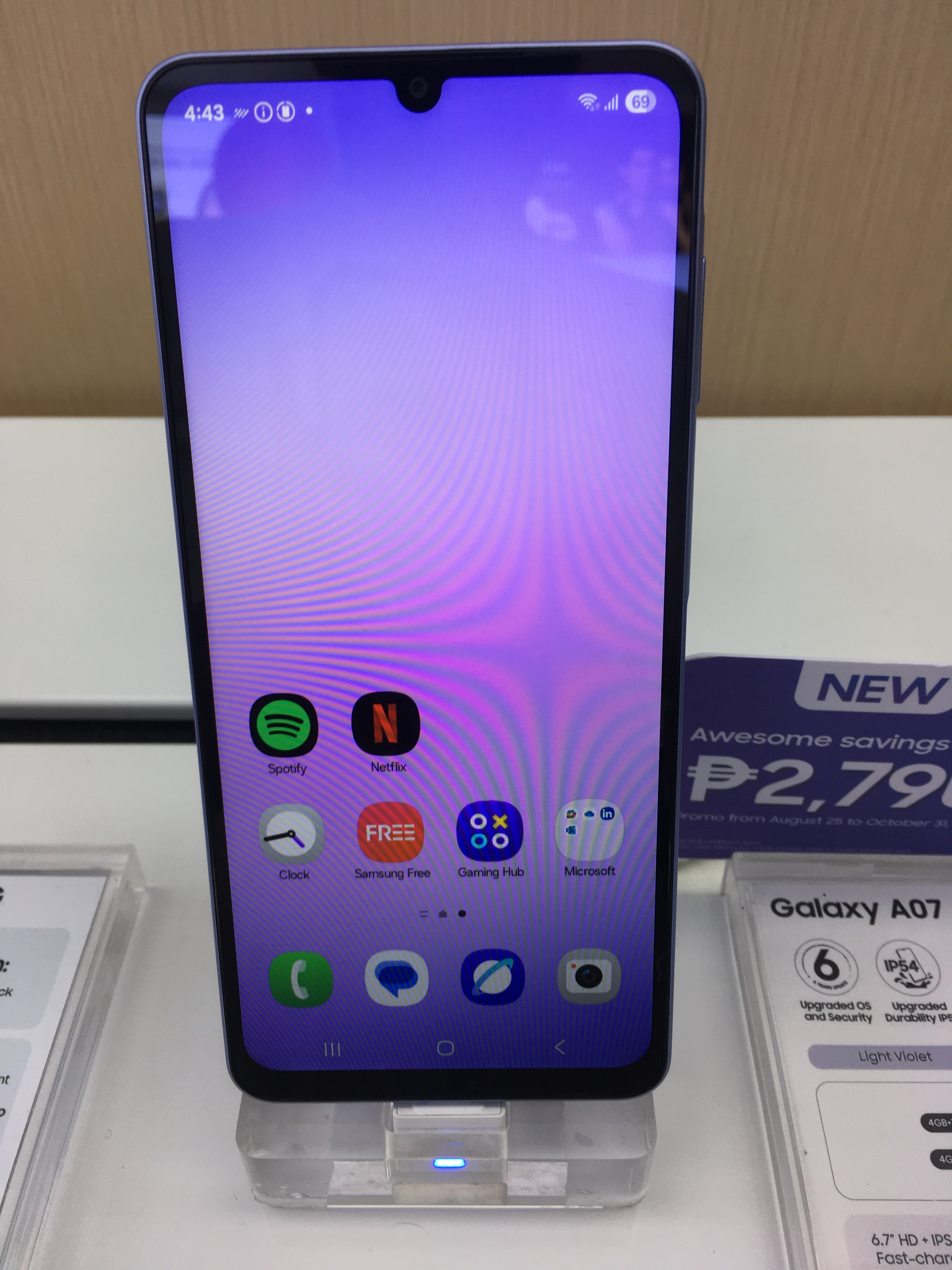
Samsung Galaxy A07
