= Android 17 =

2026 Android mobile operating system

- Version of the Android operating system

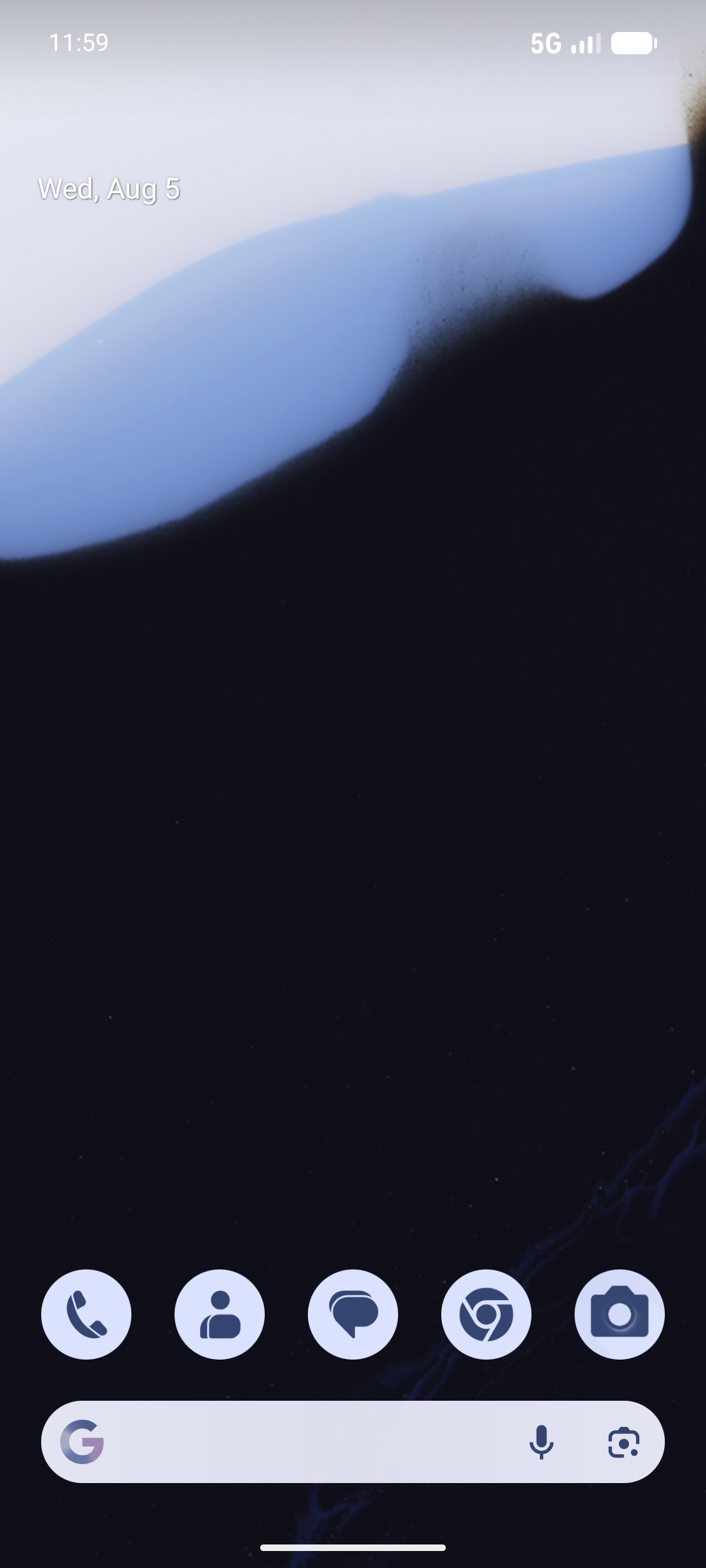
- Android 17 home screen with Pixel Launcher
- Developer: Google
- OS family: Android
- Source model: Open-source software
- Released to manufacturing: February 13, 2026; 9 months ago
- General availability: June 16, 2026; 5 months ago
- Latest release: 17.0.0 (CP2A.260605.016) / June 16, 2026; 5 months ago
- Kernel type: Monolithic (Linux)
- Preceded by: Android 16
- Official website: developer.android.com/about/versions/17

Support status
- Supported

Android 17 (codenamed Cinnamon Bun) is the seventeenth major release and the 24th version of the Android mobile operating system, developed by Google. The first public beta was released on February 13, 2026. It was released to the public on June 16, 2026. The first devices to ship with Android 17 are the Samsung Galaxy Z Fold 8 series, and the Galaxy Z Flip 8.

Android 17 is third most popular Android version at 11.69%. It will become closed-source by January 2027, and starting in Android 18, it will remain as closed-source.

== Codename ==
Since Android 14 QPR2 shifted the development process to a trunk-based development model, build IDs in 2024 began with the letter A (e.g., AP1A, AP2A). In 2025, Google changed the starting letter to B, making the internal codename for Android 16 "Baklava", a dessert starting with B. Following this alphabetical progression, Android 17 in 2026 adopted "Cinnamon Bun", starting with the letter C, as its development codename.

== Development ==
Developer Preview logo of Android 17

The traditional Developer Previews have been discontinued beginning with Android 17 and replaced by continuously updated Android Canary builds. This shift marks the start of an “always-on” testing approach for the Android platform, in which new builds are made available on an ongoing basis rather than through a separate, time-limited preview program.

Android 17’s development cycle will not end immediately after its official release in June. According to the release schedule, the platform will follow a model that includes a major release in the second quarter, followed by a minor SDK release in the fourth quarter. Android 17 will also continue to receive updates through Quarterly Platform Releases (QPRs).

Google had originally planned to ship a “Minor SDK Release” in Q4’2026, potentially including new API extensions. This schedule gives hardware manufacturers a way to support new hardware features arriving late in the year while preserving the stability of the core platform.

Google later clarified that Android 17 QPR1, planned for the third quarter of 2026, would include a minor SDK release. The company explained that some features could not wait until QPR2, so they would be delivered earlier through QPR1 instead.

== History ==
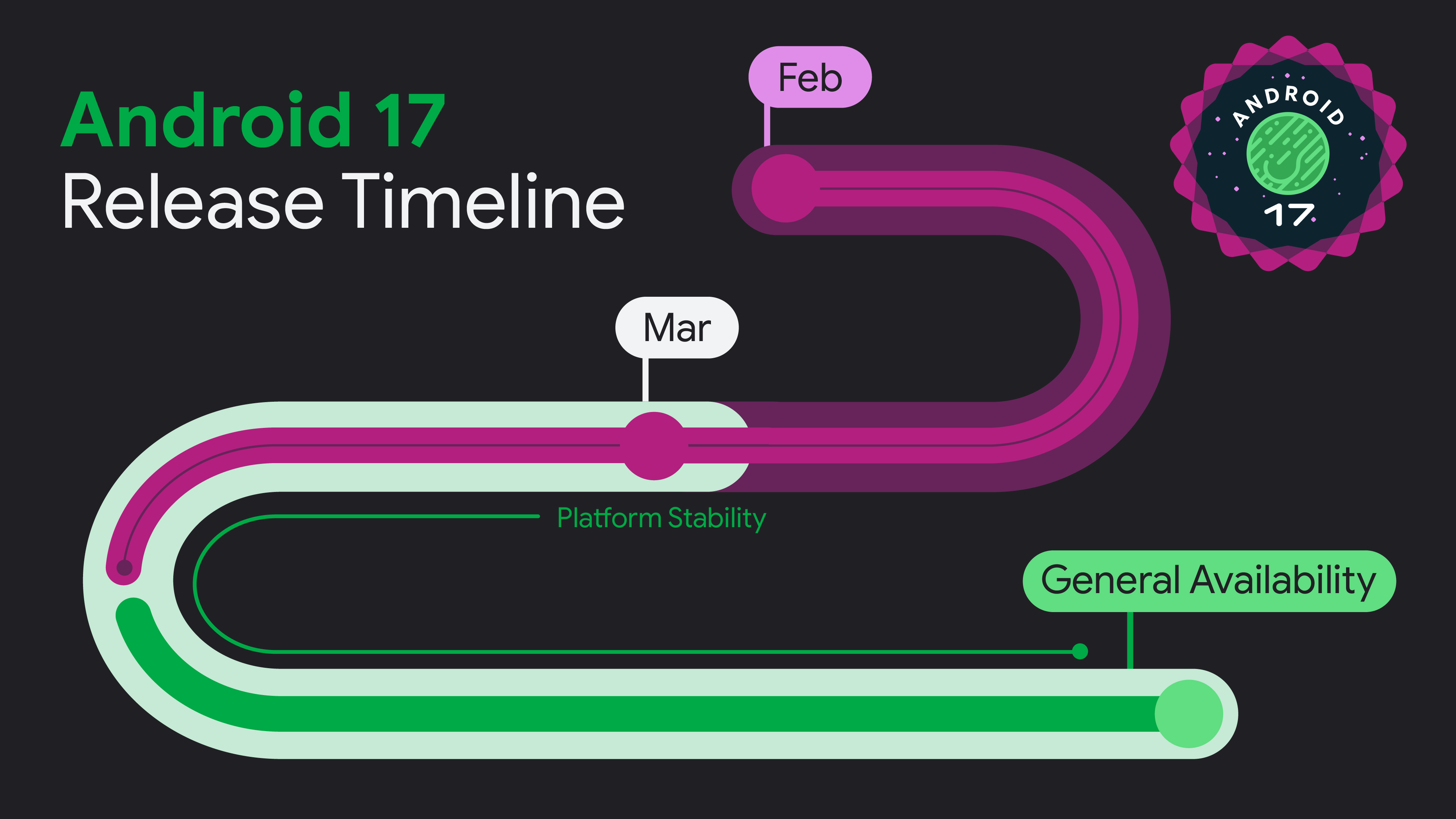
Development timeline of Android 17

Beta 1 was released on February 13, 2026.

Beta 2 was released on February 26.

Beta 3 was released on March 26.

Beta 4 was released on April 16.

The stable version was released on June 16.

== Features ==
=== API level ===
The API level has been increased to 37.

=== VVC support ===
The ability to play back Versatile Video Coding (VVC) media will be available on devices that include hardware decoding support and corresponding drivers.

=== Background audio enhancements ===
The audio architecture restricts background audio interactions, including background audio playback, audio focus requests, and volume adjustments.

=== Free screen orientation and resizability ===
The system will ignore screen orientation and resizability restrictions, completely removing the option to opt-out of big-screen orientation and resizing limitations that was previously introduced in Android 16.

=== Frosted glass extension ===
The frosted glass visual effect has been extended to more UI panels, such as the system volume adjustment slider panel.

=== Contacts picker ===
The new contacts picker grants temporary, session-only read permissions to the specific data fields requested by the user, allowing selections from either personal or work profiles. The introduction of this feature minimizes the necessity for applications to request the broad READ_CONTACTS permission to harvest entire contact lists.

=== App Lock ===
Allows users to protect individual applications with a password, requiring authentication before the app can be used.

=== EyeDropper ===
The EyeDropper API allows applications to request a color value from any pixel on the display without needing broad screen-capture permissions.

=== Split notifications and Quick Settings ===
This is an optional feature. When enabled, swiping down from the top-left corner of the screen opens the notification panel, while swiping down from the top-right corner opens the Quick Settings panel.

=== System-Wide App Bubbles ===
Users can transform any installed application into a floating, multi-window bubble by long pressing its icon on the home screen launcher.

== Version history ==
Android 17 version history
Version	Release date	Features / Changes
Beta
Beta 1	February 13, 2026	Early Beta release made available to early testers enrolled in the Android Beta Program. Unlike previous releases, Android 17 did not feature traditional Developer Previews.
Beta 2	February 26, 2026	The second beta update.
Beta 3	March 26, 2026	The third beta update. This release reached Platform Stability.
Beta 4	April 16, 2026	The fourth beta update. This is the final scheduled beta release.
Beta 4.1	June 1, 2026	An unplanned fifth beta update.
Final Release
17.0	June 16, 2026	Final release of compatible versions for applications, SDKs, and libraries.

== See also ==
- Android version history
