= Samsung Galaxy M36 5G =

2025 mid-range Android smartphone by Samsung Electronics

Samsung Galaxy M36 5G Samsung Galaxy F36 5G Samsung Galaxy Jump 4 (in South Korea)
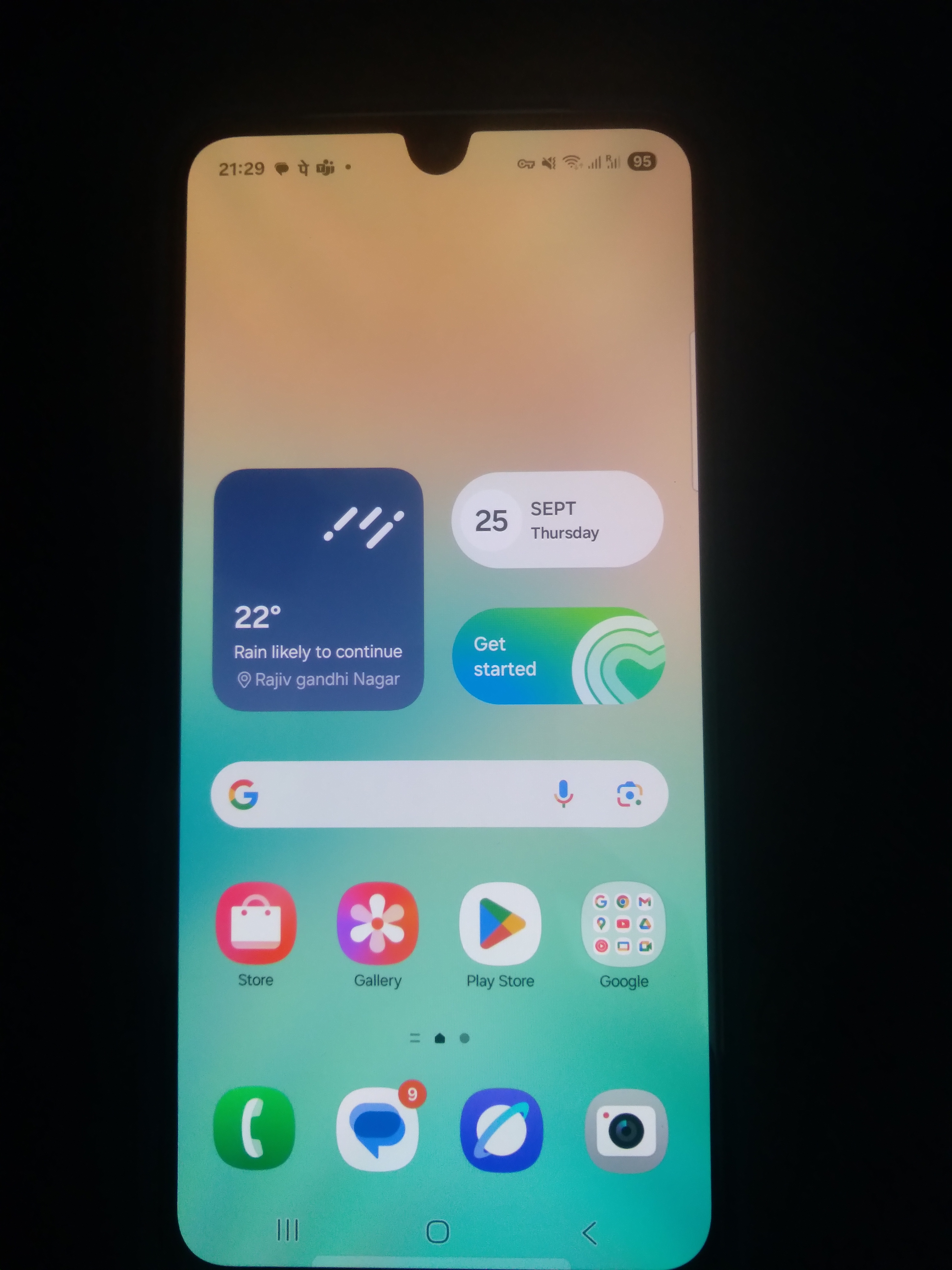
- Brand: Samsung
- Manufacturer: Samsung Electronics
- Type: Smartphone
- Series: Galaxy M/Galaxy F
- Family: Samsung Galaxy
- First released: M36 5G: June 28, 2025; 16 months ago
- Availability by region: M36 5G: July 12, 2025; 16 months ago
- Predecessor: Samsung Galaxy M35 5G
- Related: Samsung Galaxy A36 5G; Samsung Galaxy M06 5G; Samsung Galaxy M16 5G; Samsung Galaxy M56 5G
- Compatible networks: GSM / HSPA / LTE / 5G
- Form factor: Slate
- Colors: Thunder Grey, DayBreak Blue, Moonlight Blue
- Dimensions: 162.3 mm (6.39 in) H 78.6 mm (3.09 in) W 9.1 mm (0.36 in) D
- Weight: 222 g (7.8 oz)
- Operating system: Original: Android 15 with One UI 7 Current: Android 16 with One UI 8 Supports up to 6 Android upgrades and 6 years of security patches.
- System-on-chip: Samsung Exynos 1380 (5 nm)
- CPU: Octa-core (4x2.4 GHz Cortex-A78 & 4x2.0 GHz Cortex-A55)
- GPU: Mali-G68 MP5
- Memory: 6 GB, 8 GB RAM
- Storage: 128 GB, 256 GB, UFS 2.2
- Removable storage: MicroSDXC up to 1 TB
- SIM: Dual SIM (Nano-SIM, dual stand-by)
- Battery: 5000 mAh
- Charging: Super Fast charging up to 25W
- Rear camera: 50 MP, f/1.8, (wide), PDAF, OIS; 8 MP, f/2.2, (ultrawide), 1/4", 1.12 μm 2 MP, f/2.4, (macro); LED flash, panorama, HDR; 4K@30fps, 1080p@30/60fps
- Front camera: 13 MP, f/2.2, 26mm (wide); 4K@30fps, 1080p@30fps
- Display: 6.7 in (170 mm), Super AMOLED display 1080 x 2340 resolution, 19.5:9 ratio (~390 ppi density); 120Hz refresh rate Corning Gorilla Glass Victus Plus
- Sound: Stereo Speakers
- Connectivity: Wi-Fi 802.11 a/b/g/n/ac, dual-band, Wi-Fi Direct, hotspot Bluetooth 5.3, A2DP, LE
- Data inputs: USB Type-C 2.0; Fingerprint scanner (side-mounted); Accelerometer; Gyroscope; Proximity sensor; Compass
- Website: Galaxy M36 5G

The Samsung Galaxy M36 5G is a mid-range Android-based smartphone manufactured, developed and marketed by Samsung Electronics as part of its Galaxy M series. This phone was announced on June 28, 2025, with general availability from July 12, 2025.

The Galaxy M36 5G is powered by 5 nm-based chipset consisting of 8 cores at up to 2.4 GHz. It has a vapour cooling chamber, which is the first in its series. It also came equipped with 6.7-inch FHD+ display with 120 Hz refresh rate and a 5000 mAh battery with 25W fast charging system. Samsung Galaxy M36 5G will get 6 generations of Android upgrade and also have 6 years of security updates. The display has a teardrop notch design encompassing the front-facing (selfie) camera.

The Galaxy M36 5G, like its predecessor, Samsung Galaxy M35 5G, is also honest to have IP Rating, which can certifies the device's resistance to dust and water. The device also doesn't have a headphone jack, so, wired earphones needs to be used with an audio jack connector. This aligns with Samsung's broader shift towards a wireless future, mirroring similar moves by Apple and other major players.

The Galaxy M36 5G supports microSD cards for expandable storage, up to 1 TB, using its hybrid SIM slot, that means a second SIM card cannot be used along with a microSD card simultaneously. Samsung Galaxy M36 supports Bixby virtual assistant. It also has NFC, which is a wireless network technology that allows for quick contactless payments and connections.

== GenAI features ==
Galaxy M36 5G has in-built Gen AI features like Circle to Search and Gemini Live. It also has AI photo-editing tools such as Object Eraser and Image Clipper.
