= F52 =

F52 or F-52 may refer to:

- F52 (classification), a para-athletics classification
- BMW 1 Series (F52), a car
- HMS Juno (F52), a Leander-class frigate of the Royal Navy
- Samsung Galaxy F52 5G, a smartphone
- Wright F-52 Cyclone, an American radial aircraft engine
