= Samsung Galaxy Tab S12 =

2026 tablets by Samsung Electronics

Samsung Galaxy Tab S12 series
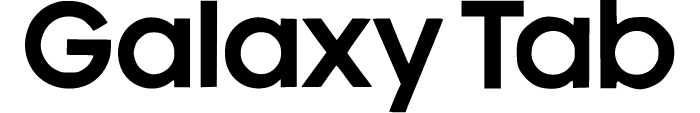
- Brand: Samsung
- Manufacturer: Samsung Electronics
- Type: Tablet computer
- Series: Galaxy Tab S
- Family: Samsung Galaxy
- First released: October 7, 2026; 43 days ago
- Availability by region: October 7, 2026; 43 days ago
- Predecessor: Samsung Galaxy Tab S11
- Compatible networks: Cellular: GSM/HSPA/4G LTE/5G (sub-6GHz)
- Form factor: Bar
- Dimensions: Tab S12+: 187.8 × 289.5 × 5.3 mm Tab S12 Ultra: 208.5 × 326.3 × 5.1 mm
- Operating system: Android 17 with One UI 9
- System-on-chip: MediaTek Dimensity 9500+
- Memory: Tab S12+: 12 GB RAM; Tab S12 Ultra: 12 GB, 16 GB RAM
- Storage: Tab S12+: 256 GB, 512 GB; Tab S12 Ultra: 256 GB, 512 GB, 1 TB
- Removable storage: Dedicated microSDXC slot
- SIM: Nano-SIM/eSIM (Cellular models only)
- Battery: Tab S12+: 10600 mAh non-user replaceable LiPo; Tab S12 Ultra: 11600 mAh non-user replaceable LiPo
- Charging: 45 W USB PD charging
- Website: Galaxy Tab S12

The Samsung Galaxy Tab S12 is a series of Android-based tablets manufactured, developed, designed and marketed by Samsung Electronics, as part of its flagship Galaxy Tab S series. It was announced on September 30, 2026 through a press release and was released on October 7, 2026. It serves as the successor to the Samsung Galaxy Tab S11.

== History ==
Before its official announcement, rumors about the Galaxy Tab S12 series from media outlets began to surface as early as July 2026 in which a picture was posted showing the actual Galaxy Tab S12+, at a Safety Korea database ahead of its unveiling. Model numbers of the Galaxy Tab S12 were discovered at a Bureau of Indian Standards for certification. Soon after, CAD renders for the Galaxy Tab S12 Ultra were leaked, revealing its design.

On July 30, 2026, Samsung confirms the existence of the Galaxy Tab S12 series in its quarterly earnings call.

In August 2026, model numbers of the Galaxy Tab S12 series were revealed in a Bluetooth SIG listing, along with listings for Google's Play Console soon after. Official images for the Galaxy Tab S12 Ultra were revealed ahead of launch, showing a familiar design. Renders of the Galaxy Tab S12 Ultra were published soon after, which housed a design closely resembling that of the Galaxy Tab S11 Ultra (with thin bezels, a notch at the top of the display, a dual rear camera and a gray finish). The S Pen shown alongside the tablet retained the side button of the previous generation. The retention of the notch ran counter to earlier reports that Samsung would move to a punch-hole cutout.

In September 2026, launch dates for the Galaxy Tab S12 series were revealed via official renders. A further set of renders were published soon after, which showed both models in gray and silver finishes, with a single rear camera on the Galaxy Tab S12+ and a dual rear camera on the Galaxy Tab S12 Ultra. The S Pen appeared alongside both models.

Commentary published ahead of the announcement characterized the Galaxy Tab S12 Ultra as an iterative update that carried over the external design of its predecessor rather than introducing a redesign. Renders showed the Ultra retaining a notch in the top bezel in landscape orientation, while the Galaxy Tab S12+ was shown without one.

The tablets were announced on September 30, 2026 through a press release.

== Features ==
=== Design ===
The tablets still use the same aluminum body of their predecessors.

Model	Galaxy Tab S12+ S12 Ultra
Base Colors	Gray; Silver

=== Display ===
The Tab S12+ uses the same panel specifications from its predecessor (12.4-inch Dynamic AMOLED 2X panel with a resolution of 1752 × 2800 and a 120 Hz refresh rate), while the Tab S12 Ultra also uses the same panel specifications from its predecessor (14.6-inch Dynamic AMOLED 2X panel with a resolution of 1848 × 2960 and a 120 Hz refresh rate).

Both tablets continue to have a peak brightness of up to 1,600 nits (with support for HDR10, HDR10+ and HLG), an anti-reflective coating and an in-display fingerprint reader, but brings improvements to Vision Booster (a feature which was first debuted on the Galaxy Tab S9 series).

=== Performance ===
The Tab S12+ and Tab S12 Ultra uses the MediaTek Dimensity 9500 chipsets (with Mali G1-Ultra MC12 graphics). Storage and RAM options remain the same from its predecessors: internal storage options of 256 GB, 512 GB, and 1 TB (with the latter exclusive for Tab S12 Ultra); RAM options of 12 GB or 16 GB (with the latter also exclusive for Tab S12 Ultra). MicroSD card support is still present.

Samsung states that the chipset delivers a 19% faster CPU, a 17% faster GPU and a 61% faster NPU than the Dimensity 9400+ used in the Galaxy Tab S11 Ultra.

Both models replace the flat vapor chamber of the Galaxy Tab S11 series with a three-dimensional vapor chamber, which Samsung says dissipates heat faster and reduces throttling during sustained workloads such as gaming and video editing. Tests by a reviewer shows the Tab S12 Ultra held 84.7% stability in the 3DMark Wild Life stress test, against 68.7% for the Tab S11 Ultra, and ran demanding games at high graphics settings for more than 30 minutes without noticeable slowdown.

=== Cameras ===
The Tab S12 Ultra carries over the same camera setup from its predecessor: a 13 MP primary wide rear camera, an 8 MP ultrawide, and a 12 MP front camera. The Plus model carries over the 13 MP primary wide rear camera and the 12 MP front camera, but drops the 8 MP ultrawide rear camera.

=== Audio ===
Both models use a four-speaker array that Samsung markets as a 4-channel spatial audio system, in which two-channel sources are upmixed to four channels; the company presents it as an upgrade over the audio system of the Galaxy Tab S11 series.

=== Software ===
The Galaxy Tab S12 series were the first Galaxy tablets to have Android 17 (One UI 9) pre-installed and will receive 7 years of software and security updates (with support ending within 2033).

	Pre-installed OS	OS Upgrades history							End of support
	Pre-installed OS	1st	2nd	3rd	4th	5th	6th	7th	End of support
Tab S12+ Tab S12 Ultra	Android 17 (One UI 9.0)								Expected within 2033
