= Samsung Galaxy Tab S10 =

2024 flagship tablets by Samsung Electronics

Samsung Galaxy Tab S10 series

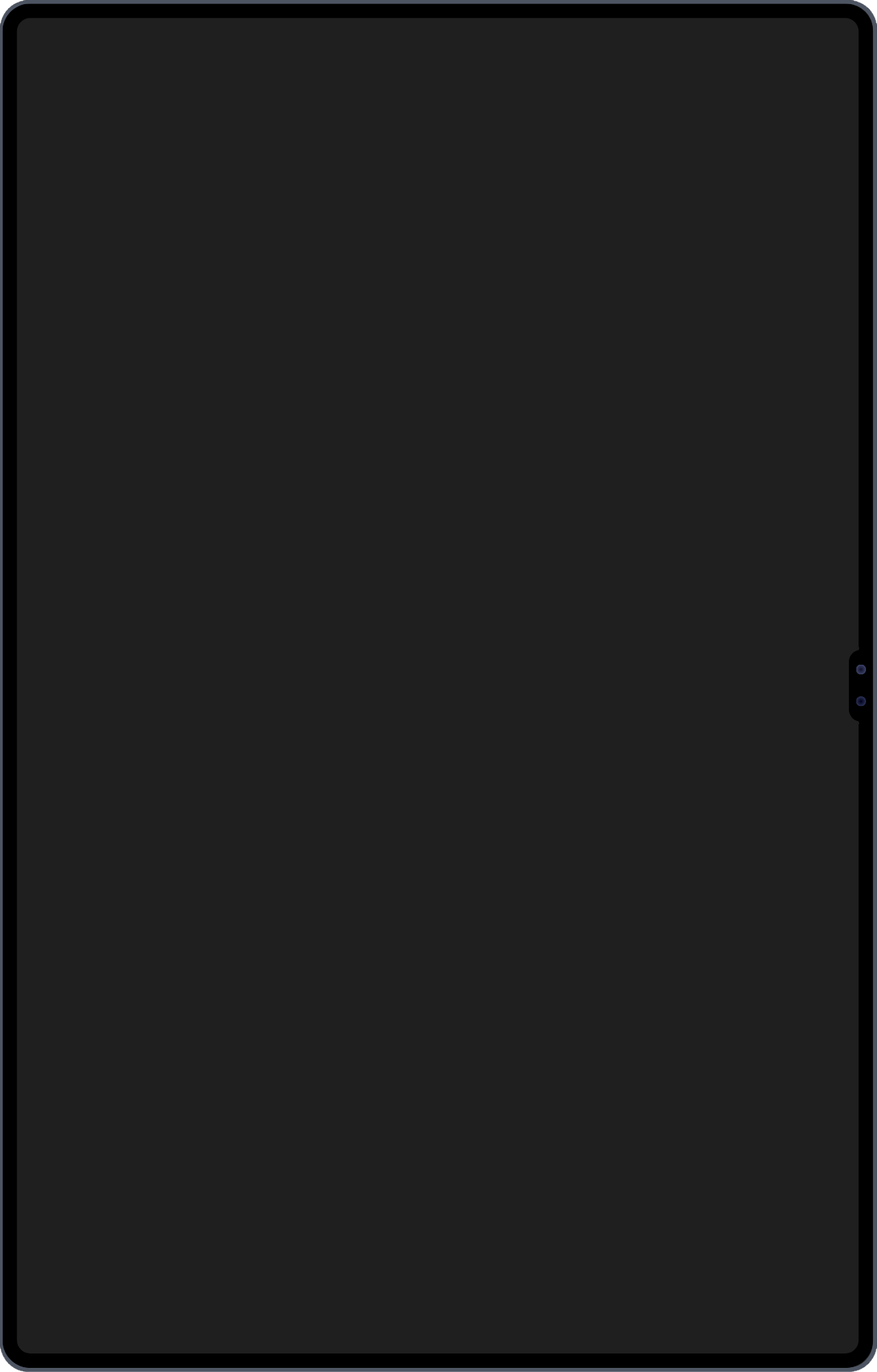
- Front view of the Galaxy Tab S10 Ultra in Moonstone Gray
- Brand: Samsung
- Manufacturer: Samsung Electronics
- Type: Tablet computer
- Series: Galaxy Tab S
- Family: Samsung Galaxy
- First released: Tab S10+/S10 Ultra: September 27, 2024; 2 years ago Tab S10 FE/FE+: April 2, 2025; 19 months ago Tab S10 Lite: August 25, 2025; 14 months ago
- Availability by region: Tab S10+/S10 Ultra: October 3, 2024; 2 years ago Tab S10 FE/FE+: April 3, 2025; 19 months ago Tab S10 Lite: September 4, 2025; 14 months ago
- Discontinued: Tab S10+/S10 Ultra: September 4, 2025; 14 months ago
- Predecessor: Samsung Galaxy Tab S6 Lite (for S10 Lite); Samsung Galaxy Tab S9
- Successor: Samsung Galaxy Tab S11
- Compatible networks: Cellular: GSM/HSPA/4G LTE/5G (sub-6GHz)
- Form factor: Bar
- Colors: Moonstone Gray (All models); Platinum Silver (All models); Dark Sky Blue (Tab S10 FE/S10 FE+ only); Coral Red(Tab S10 Lite only)
- Dimensions: Tab S10+: 285.4 x 185.4 x 5.6 mm (11.24 x 7.30 x 0.22 in); Tab S10 Ultra: 326.4 x 208.6 x 5.4 mm (12.85 x 8.21 x 0.21 in); Tab S10 FE: 254.3 x 165.8 x 6 mm (10.01 x 6.53 x 0.24 in); Tab S10 FE+: 300.6 x 194.7 x 6 mm (11.83 x 7.67 x 0.24 in); Tab S10 Lite: 254.3 x 165.8 x 6.6 mm (10.01 x 6.53 x 0.26 in)
- Weight: Tab S10+: 571g (Wi-Fi), 576g (5G); Tab S10 Ultra: 718g (Wi-Fi), 723g (5G); Tab S10 FE: 497g (Wi-Fi), 500g (5G); Tab S10 FE+: 664g (Wi-Fi), 668g (5G); Tab S10 Lite: 524g (Wi-Fi), 524g (5G)
- Operating system: Original (Tab S10+/S10 Ultra): Android 14 with One UI 6.1.1 (Tab S10 FE/S10 FE+/S10 Lite): Android 15 with One UI 7.0 Current: Android 17 with One UI 9.0
- System-on-chip: Tab S10+/S10 Ultra: MediaTek Dimensity 9300+ (4nm); Tab S10 FE/S10 FE+: Samsung Exynos 1580 (4nm); Tab S10 Lite: Samsung Exynos 1380 (5nm)
- Memory: Tab S10+: 12GB; Tab S10 Ultra: 12GB/16GB; Tab S10 FE/S10 FE+: 8GB/12GB; Tab S10 Lite: 6GB/8GB
- Storage: Tab S10+: 256GB/512GB UFS 4.0; Tab S10 Ultra: 256GB/512GB/1TB UFS 4.0; Tab S10 FE/S10 FE+/Lite: 128GB/256GB UFS 3.1
- Removable storage: dedicated microSDXC slot
- SIM: Nano-SIM/eSIM (Cellular models only)
- Battery: Tab S10+ and S10 FE+: 10090 mAh non-user replaceable LiPo; Tab S10 Ultra: 11200 mAh non-user replaceable LiPo; Tab S10 FE/Lite: 8000 mAh non-user replaceable LiPo
- Charging: Tab S10+/S10 Ultra/S10 FE/S10 FE+: Fast charging up to 45 W Tab S10 Lite: Fast charging up to 25 W
- Rear camera: Wide: 13 MP, f/2.0, 26mm, 1/3.4", 1.0μm, AF; Ultrawide: 8 MP, f/2.2
- Front camera: Ultrawide: 12MP 120° Wide (Tab S10 Ultra): 12MP 26mm
- Display: Tab S10+: 12.4 in (310 mm) diagonal Dynamic AMOLED 2X 1752 x 2800 px 16:10 aspect-ratio wide-screen 120HZ HDR10+; Tab S10 Ultra: 14.6 in (370 mm) diagonal Dynamic AMOLED 2X 1848 x 2960 px 16:10 aspect-ratio wide-screen 120HZ HDR10+; Tab S10 FE: 10.9 in (280 mm) diagonal Super PLS LCD 1440 x 2304 px 16:10 aspect-ratio wide-screen 90HZ HDR10; Tab S10 FE+: 13.1 in (330 mm) diagonal Super PLS LCD 1800 x 2880 px 16:10 aspect-ratio wide-screen 90HZ HDR10; Tab S10 Lite: 10.9 in (280 mm) diagonal TFT LCD 1320 x 2112 px 16:10 aspect-ratio wide-screen 90HZ HDR10
- Sound: Tab S10+/Tab S10 Ultra: 4 speaker audio (Dolby Atmos); Tab S10 FE/S10 FE+/Lite: 2 speaker audio (Dolby Atmos)
- Data inputs: Multitouch, capacitive touchscreen, S Pen, microphone, accelerometer.
- Water resistance: IP68 water resistance (1.5m of fresh water for 30 minutes) for tablet and S Pen
- Website: www.samsung.com/us/tablets/galaxy-tab-s10/

The Samsung Galaxy Tab S10 is a series of Android-based tablets developed, manufactured and marketed by Samsung Electronics unveiled via press release on September 27, 2024 alongside the Galaxy S24 FE as the successor to the Galaxy Tab S9 series. The tablets were released on October 3, 2024 with Plus and Ultra models.

On April 2, 2025, Samsung unveiled Galaxy Tab S10 FE and S10 FE+ as successors for the Galaxy Tab S9 FE series. Both tablets were released on the day after the press release announcement, on April 3, 2025. On August 25, 2025, Samsung announced the Galaxy Tab S10 Lite as a successor to the Galaxy Tab S6 Lite.

This release marks the first time that only two different screen sizes for flagship models were released (Ultra and for this iteration, the Plus variant), the base model would only return on the successor, the Galaxy Tab S11.

== Line-up ==
A Platinum Silver Samsung Galaxy Tab S10+ resting on a table face down with the bundled S Pen charging

The Galaxy Tab S10 series includes five models: Galaxy Tab S10+, Galaxy Tab S10 Ultra, Galaxy Tab S10 FE, Galaxy Tab S10 FE+, Galaxy Tab S10 Lite. Notably, there is no base model in this line-up, marking the first time since the Galaxy Tab S8 series introduced a three-model release (the base model would later return with its successor, the Galaxy Tab S11).

With the release of Tab S10+ and Tab S10 Ultra, it brings minor upgrades over its predecessor, which includes the display and chipset used. Dimensions of the first two tablets were maintained from its predecessor, but became lighter. It is also the first Galaxy Tab S tablet to sport a MediaTek chipset (its predecessor used a Qualcomm Snapdragon chipset and initially, certain Galaxy Tab A model first used a MediaTek chipset). It also brings improvements with its vapor chamber.

== Features ==
=== Design ===
The tablets still use the same aluminum body from its predecessors, and only comes in two different colors (three for the FE and Lite models).

Model	Galaxy Tab S10+ and Galaxy Tab S10 Ultra	Galaxy Tab S10 FE and Galaxy Tab S10 FE+	Galaxy Tab S10 Lite
Base colors	Moonstone Gray; Platinum Silver	Gray; Silver; Dark Sky Blue	Gray; Silver; Coral Red

=== Display ===
For the base models (Tab S10+ and Tab S10 Ultra), it kept the screen size, the same resolution (1752×2800 and 1848 x 2960, respectively) and the same panel type (Dynamic AMOLED 2X display with 120 Hz refresh rate) from its predecessors, the Galaxy Tab S9+ and Tab S9 Ultra. The only change for this iteration is the addition of an anti-reflective coating.

For the Tab S10 FE, it kept the same screen resolution and refresh rate from its predecessor. Meanwhile, the Tab S10 FE+ brings an upgrade over its predecessor, which brings a larger 13.1-inch display (compared to the 12.4-inch display from the Tab S9 FE+), making it the first Samsung tablet to include a display size in the 13 to 14-inch range, and a larger resolution. Other than that, it kept the 90 Hz refresh rate.

And for the Tab S10 Lite, it inherited the same display type used from the Galaxy Tab S9 FE, albeit with a slightly downgraded resolution (1320×2112). Other than that, it kept the 90 Hz refresh rate.

=== Performance ===
The Plus and Ultra models use the MediaTek Dimensity 9300+ chipset, an 8-core chipset with a 4 nm node and an Immortalis-G720 MC12 GPU. Notably, this is the first instance of Samsung using MediaTek chipsets for their Tab S series of tablets, previously opting for Snapdragon or Exynos chips. RAM options are either in 12 GB or 16 GB (with the latter only available on the S10 Ultra), while storage options range from 256 GB to 1 TB (the latter also exclusive to the Tab S10 Ultra). The Plus and Ultra models continue to use UFS 4.0 as its internal storage type.

The FE and FE+ models use the Samsung Exynos 1580 chipset, an 8-core chipset with 4 nm node and an Xclipse 540 GPU, first used on the Galaxy A56. RAM options are either in 8 GB or 12 GB, while storage options are either in 128 GB or 256 GB. The FE and FE+ models use UFS 3.1 as its internal storage type, an upgrade from the UFS 2.2 on its predecessors.

The Lite model uses the Samsung Exynos 1380 chipset, an 8-core chipset with 5 nm node and Mali-G68 MP5 GPU. This is also the same chipset used on the Galaxy Tab S9 FE and Tab S9 FE+, Galaxy A54, Galaxy A35, and the Galaxy A26. RAM options are either in 6 GB or 8 GB, while storage options are either in 128 GB or 256 GB. The Lite model use UFS 2.1 as its internal storage type, a slight upgrade over its predecessor.

=== Cameras ===
==== Rear camera ====
The Tab S10+ and Tab S10 Ultra contain a 13 MP wide camera and an 8 MP ultrawide camera. They come with 4K@30fps and 1080p@30fps recording capabilities.

The Tab S10 FE and Tab S10 FE+ contain only a single 13 MP wide camera, with the ultrawide rear camera being removed for the FE+ model. They also come with 4K@30fps and 1080p@30fps recording capabilities.

The Tab S10 Lite contain a 8 MP wide camera, which is the same as the three variants of the Tab S6 Lite.

==== Front camera ====
The Tab S10/S10 Ultra/S10 FE/S10 FE+ come with a 12 MP 120° ultrawide camera, while the Tab S10 Ultra includes an additional 12 MP 26 mm wide lens.

The Tab S10 Lite come with a 5 MP camera, also the same as the three variants of the Tab S6 Lite.

=== Software ===
In-box, the Galaxy S10+ and S10 Ultra comes with One UI 6.1.1 (Android 14) pre-installed, while the S10 FE, FE+, and Lite come with One UI 7.0 (Android 15) pre-installed, and are the first in the Samsung Galaxy Tab S series to offer 7 years of security patches and OS upgrades, despite having different pre-installed OS and One UI versions.

It is the first iteration of the series to not support 32-bit applications. Samsung Galaxy tablets that were released prior to the Galaxy Tab S10 series continue to support 32-bit apps.

	Pre-installed OS	OS Upgrades history							End of support
	Pre-installed OS	1st	2nd	3rd	4th	5th	6th	7th	End of support
Tab S10+ Tab S10 Ultra	Android 14 (One UI 6.1.1)	Android 15 (One UI 7.0); April 2025	Android 16 (One UI 8.0); September 2025 (One UI 8.5); May 2026	Android 17 (One UI 9.0); November 2026					Expected 2031
Tab S10 FE; Tab S10 FE+	Android 15 (One UI 7.0)	Android 16 (One UI 8.0); October 2025 (One UI 8.5); May 2026	Android 17 (One UI 9.0); November 2026						Expected 2032
Tab S10 Lite	Android 15 (One UI 7.0)	Android 16 (One UI 8.0); October 2025 (One UI 8.5); May 2026	Android 17 (One UI 9.0); November 2026						Expected 2032
