= Samsung Galaxy A06 =

2024 Android-based smartphones manufactured by Samsung Electronics

Samsung Galaxy A06 Samsung Galaxy A06 5G
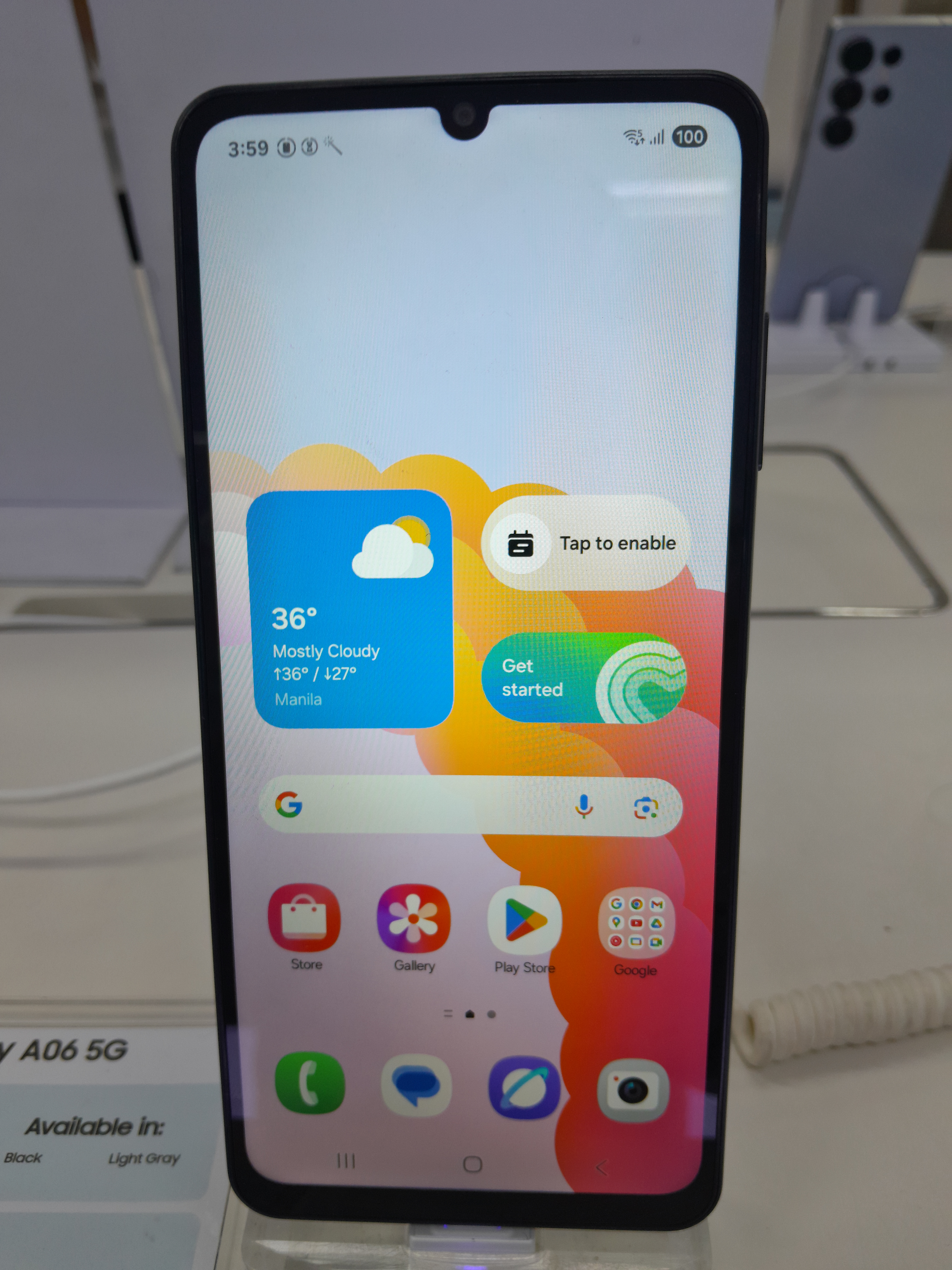
- Samsung Galaxy A06 5G
- Also sold as: Galaxy M06 5G; Galaxy F06 5G; Galaxy A25 5G (Japan)
- Brand: Samsung
- Manufacturer: Samsung Electronics
- Type: Smartphone
- Series: Galaxy A Galaxy M Galaxy F
- Family: Samsung Galaxy
- First released: A06: August 16, 2024; 2 years ago F06 5G: February 12, 2025; 21 months ago A06 5G: February 19, 2025; 20 months ago M06 5G: February 27, 2025; 20 months ago
- Availability by region: A06: August 22, 2024; 2 years ago F06 5G: February 20, 2025; 20 months ago A06 5G: February 19, 2025; 20 months ago M06 5G: March 7, 2025; 20 months ago
- Predecessor: Samsung Galaxy A05
- Successor: Samsung Galaxy A07
- Related: Samsung Galaxy A16; Samsung Galaxy A26 5G; Samsung Galaxy A36 5G; Samsung Galaxy A56 5G
- Compatible networks: A06: 2G / 3G / 4G LTE; A06 5G, M06 5G and F06 5G: 2G / 3G / 4G LTE / 5G NR
- Form factor: Slate
- Colors: A06: Blue, Gold, White; A06 5G: Black, Gray, Light Green; M06 5G: Amazing Black, Sage Green; F06 5G: Bahama Blue, Lit Violet
- Dimensions: 167.3 mm (6.59 in) H 77.3 mm (3.04 in) W 8 mm (0.31 in) D
- Weight: A06: 189 g (6.7 oz); A06 5G, M06 5G and F06 5G: 191 g (6.7 oz)
- Operating system: Original: LTE variant: Android 14 with One UI 6.1; 5G variants: Android 15 with One UI 7.0; Current: LTE variant: Android 16 with One UI 8.0; 5G variants: Android 17 with One UI 9.0
- System-on-chip: A06: MediaTek Helio G85 (12 nm); A06 5G, M06 5G and F06 5G: MediaTek Dimensity 6300 (6 nm)
- CPU: A06: Octa-core (2x2.0 GHz Cortex-A75 & 6x1.8 GHz Cortex-A55); A06 5G: Octa-core (2x2.4 GHz Cortex-A76 & 6x2.0 GHz Cortex-A55)
- GPU: A06: Mali-G52 MC2; A06 5G, M06 5G and F06 5G: Mali-G57 MC2
- Memory: 4, 6 GB
- Storage: 64, 128 GB
- SIM: Dual nano-SIM
- Battery: 5000 mAh
- Charging: 25 W Super Fast Charging (Charger not included in box)
- Rear camera: Dual-Camera Setup; Primary: Samsung ISOCELL (S5K)JN1; 50 MP, f/1.8, 26mm, FoV 79.2°, 1/2.76", 0.64µm, PDAF; Depth: SmartSens SC202CS; 2 MP, f/2.4, 1/5.1", 1.75µm; Camera features: LED flash; Video recording: 1080p@30/60fps
- Front camera: GalaxyCore GC08A8; 8 MP, f/2.0, 26mm (wide), FoV 79°, 1/4.0", 1.12µm; Video recording: 1080p@30fps
- Display: A06: 6.7 in (170 mm); 720 x 1600 px resolution, 20:9 ratio (~262 ppi density); PLS LCD, 60Hz; A06 5G, F06 5G and M06 5G: 6.7 in (170 mm); 720 x 1600 px resolution, 20:9 ratio (~262 ppi density); PLS LCD, 90Hz
- Sound: Loudspeaker, 3.5 mm auxiliary (headphone jack)
- Connectivity: Wi-Fi 802.11 a/b/g/n/ac, dual-band, Wi-Fi Direct; Bluetooth 5.3, A2DP, LE
- Data inputs: Multi-touch screen; USB Type-C 2.0; Fingerprint scanner (side-mounted); Accelerometer; Gyroscope; Proximity sensor; Compass
- Water resistance: A06 5G, M06 5G and F06 5G: IP54
- Model: A06: SM-A065F, SM-A065F/DS, SM-A065M, SM-A065M/DS; A06 5G: SM-A066B, SM-A066B/DS; M06 5G: SM-M066B, SM-M066B/DS; F06 5G: SM-F066B, SM-F066B/DS

The Samsung Galaxy A06 and Samsung Galaxy A06 5G are Android entry-level smartphones developed by Samsung Electronics, as part of the Galaxy A series. The LTE version was announced on August 16, 2024 and released 6 days later, while the 5G version was announced and released on February 19, 2025.

There are also several rebranded versions of the device: the Galaxy M06 5G (announced on February 27, 2025), the Galaxy F06 5G (announced on February 12, 2025), and the Galaxy A25 5G for Japan (announced on February 14, 2025, which is not to be confused with the existing model of the same name).

For the first time in the Galaxy A0x/M0x/F0x series, a 5G version is also available, with its predecessor being the last Galaxy A0x model to be released with LTE connectivity only.

== Specifications ==
=== Design ===
Similar with its predecessor, it features a plastic back, plastic frame, and a glass front.

Galaxy A06 LTE	Galaxy A06 5G
Light Blue; Black; Gold	Light Blue; Black; Light Green

=== Hardware ===
==== Display ====
Both devices share the same screen specifications, 6.7 in (170 mm) and 720 x 1600 px resolution (20:9 ratio (~262 ppi density)), PLS LCD, with the only difference being the refresh rate (60 Hz for the LTE version, 90 Hz for the 5G version).

==== Battery ====
All variants have the same 5000mAh battery with 25W Fast Charging support.

==== Processor and memory ====
The LTE variant of the Galaxy A06 uses the MediaTek Helio G85 processor, while the 5G variants uses the MediaTek Dimensity 6300 processor. Both variants are available with the following RAM and storage configurations: 4/64 GB, 4/128 GB, and 6/128 GB. These are also the last devices in the Galaxy A/M/F series to feature eMMC 5.1 storage, but they also continue to support microSD cards.

==== Camera ====
All variants have a dual camera setup, with a 50 MP main camera and a 2 MP macro camera. It has a 8 MP front-facing camera. The rear camera setup also includes an LED flash.

=== Software ===
The LTE version was shipped with Android 14 and One UI 6.1, while the 5G version was shipped with Android 15 and One UI 7. For unknown reasons, the LTE version is only slated to receive 2 OS upgrades and 4 years of security updates (until 2028), while the 5G model and its rebranded versions are slated to receive 4 OS upgrades and the same 4 years of security updates (until 2029).

Starting with the Galaxy A06 (including its variants) and all of its successors, it no longer supports 32-bit ARMv7 applications due to restrictions in the SoC. Other Galaxy devices (except watches) from 2024 onwards will also not support 32-bit ARMv7 apps.

	Pre-installed OS	OS Upgrades history				End of support
	Pre-installed OS	1st	2nd	3rd	4th	End of support
A06 LTE	Android 14 (One UI 6.1)	Android 15 (One UI 7.0); July 2025	Android 16 (One UI 8.0); October 2025	—N/a		Expected 2028
A06 5G; A25 5G (Japan)	Android 15 (One UI 7.0)	Android 16 (One UI 8.0); October 2025 (One UI 8.5); June 2026	Android 17 (One UI 9.0); November 2026			Expected 2029
M06 5G	Android 15 (One UI 7.0)	Android 16 (One UI 8.0); October 2025 (One UI 8.5); June 2026	Android 17 (One UI 9.0); November 2026			Expected 2029
F06 5G	Android 15 (One UI 7.0)	Android 16 (One UI 8.0); October 2025 (One UI 8.5); June 2026	Android 17 (One UI 9.0); November 2026			Expected 2029

== Gallery ==
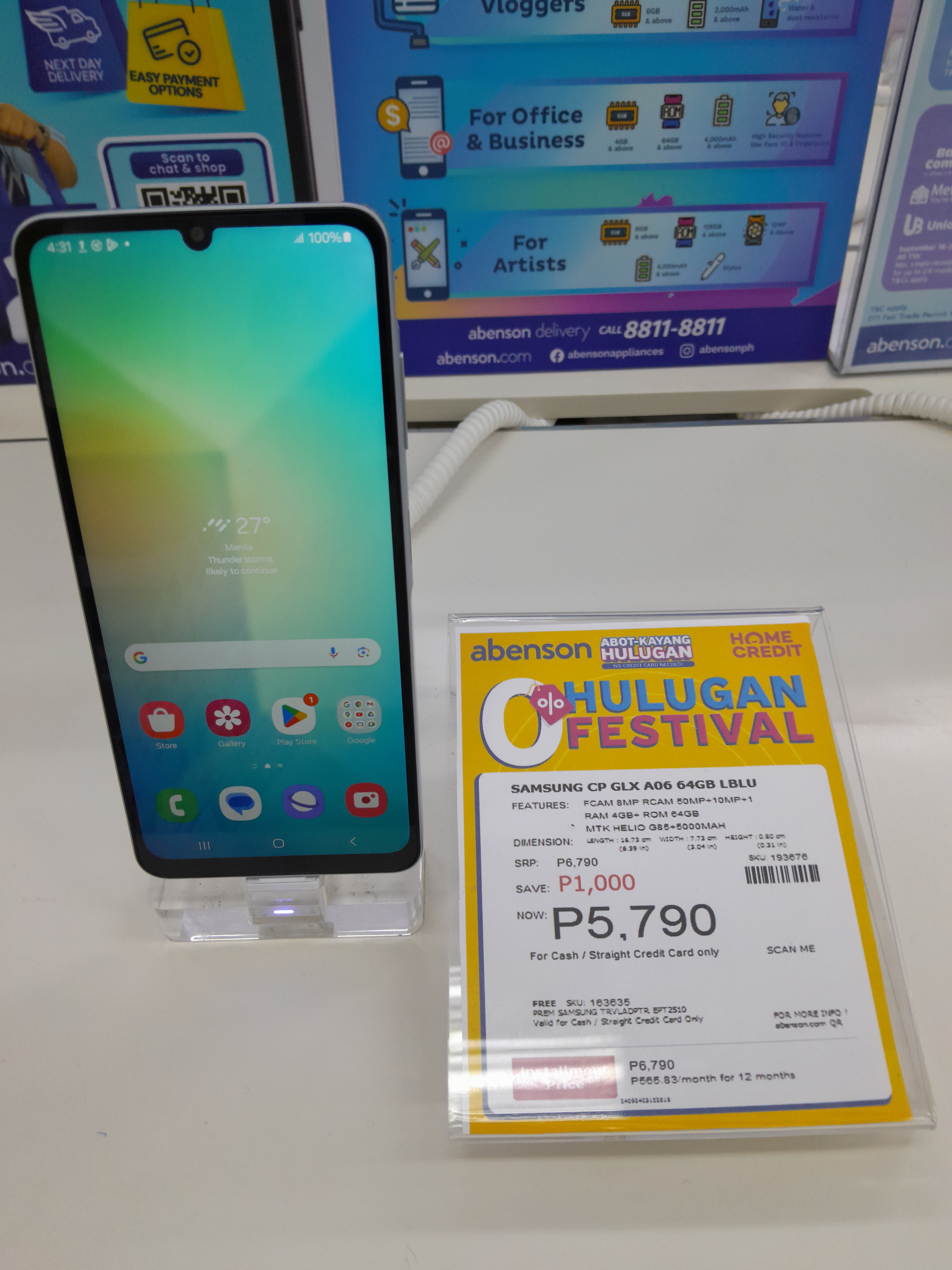
Samsung Galaxy A06
