= Samsung Galaxy A26 5G =

2025 Android-based smartphone manufactured by Samsung

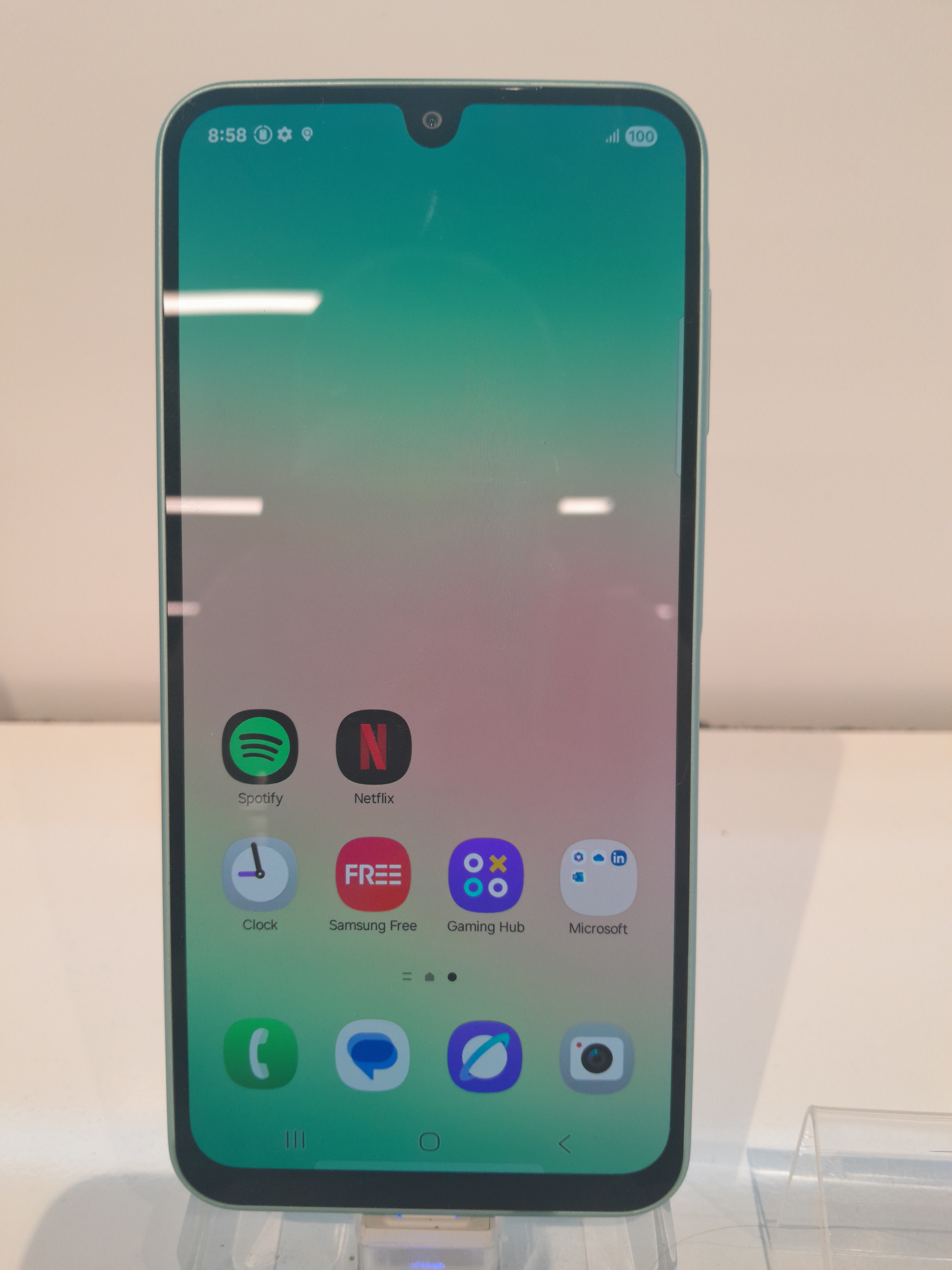
- Brand: Samsung Galaxy
- Manufacturer: Samsung Electronics
- Type: Smartphone
- Series: Galaxy A series
- First released: March 2, 2025; 20 months ago
- Availability by region: March 19, 2025; 19 months ago
- Predecessor: Samsung Galaxy A25 5G
- Successor: Samsung Galaxy A27 5G
- Related: Samsung Galaxy A06; Samsung Galaxy A16; Samsung Galaxy A36 5G; Samsung Galaxy A56 5G
- Compatible networks: GSM / HSPA / LTE / 5G
- Form factor: Slate
- Colors: Black, White, Mint, Peach Pink
- Dimensions: 164 mm (6.5 in) H 77.5 mm (3.05 in) W 7.7 mm (0.30 in) D
- Weight: 200 g (7.1 oz)
- Operating system: Original: Android 15 with One UI 7 Current: Android 17 with One UI 9
- System-on-chip: Exynos 1380 (5nm) (all except Latin America); Exynos 1280 (5nm) (Latin America)
- CPU: Octa-core (2x2.4 GHz Cortex-A78 & 6x2.0 GHz Cortex-A55) (Exynos 1280); Octa-core (4x2.4 GHz Cortex-A78 & 4x2.0 GHz Cortex-A55) (Exynos 1380)
- GPU: Mali-G68 MP5 (Exynos 1380); Mali-G58 (Exynos 1280)
- Memory: 6 GB, 8 GB RAM
- Storage: 128 GB or 256 GB
- Removable storage: microSDXC
- SIM: Single SIM (Nano-SIM) or Dual SIM (Nano-SIM, dual stand-by)
- Battery: 5000 mAh
- Charging: Fast charging 25W
- Rear camera: Triple-Camera Setup; Primary: Samsung ISOCELL (S5K)JN1; 50 MP, f/1.8, 27mm, FoV 78.4°, 1/2.76", 0.64 μm, PDAF, OIS; Ultrawide: Samsung ISOCELL (S5K)4HA; 8 MP, f/2.2, 16mm, FoV 108.7°, 1/4.0", 1.12 μm; Macro: GalaxyCore GC02M1; 2 MP, f/2.4, 1/5.0", 1.75 μm; Camera features: LED flash, panorama, HDR; Video recording: 4K@30fps, 1080p@30fps, 720p@480fps, gyro-EIS
- Front camera: Hynix Hi-1339; 13 MP, f/2.2, 25mm (wide), FoV 80.6°, 1/3.06", 1.12 μm; Video recording: 1080p@30fps
- Display: 6.7 in (170 mm), Infinity-U Display; 1080 x 2340 px resolution, 19.5:9 ratio (~385 ppi density); Super AMOLED, 120Hz refresh rate
- Connectivity: Wi-Fi 802.11 a/b/g/n/ac, dual-band, Wi-Fi Direct, hotspot Bluetooth 5.3, A2DP, LE; GPS, GALILEO, GLONASS, BeiDou, QZSS, NFC
- Data inputs: Multi-touch screen; USB Type-C 2.0; Fingerprint scanner (side-mounted); Accelerometer; Gyroscope; Compass
- Water resistance: IP67 dust/water resistant (up to 1m for 30 min)
- Model: SM-A266x (Last letter varies by carrier & international models)

The Samsung Galaxy A26 5G is a mid-range Android-based smartphone designed, developed and marketed by Samsung Electronics as a part of its Galaxy A series. The phone was announced on March 2, 2025 along with the Galaxy A36 5G and the Galaxy A56 5G. The phone was released on March 19, 2025.

== Specifications ==
=== Design ===
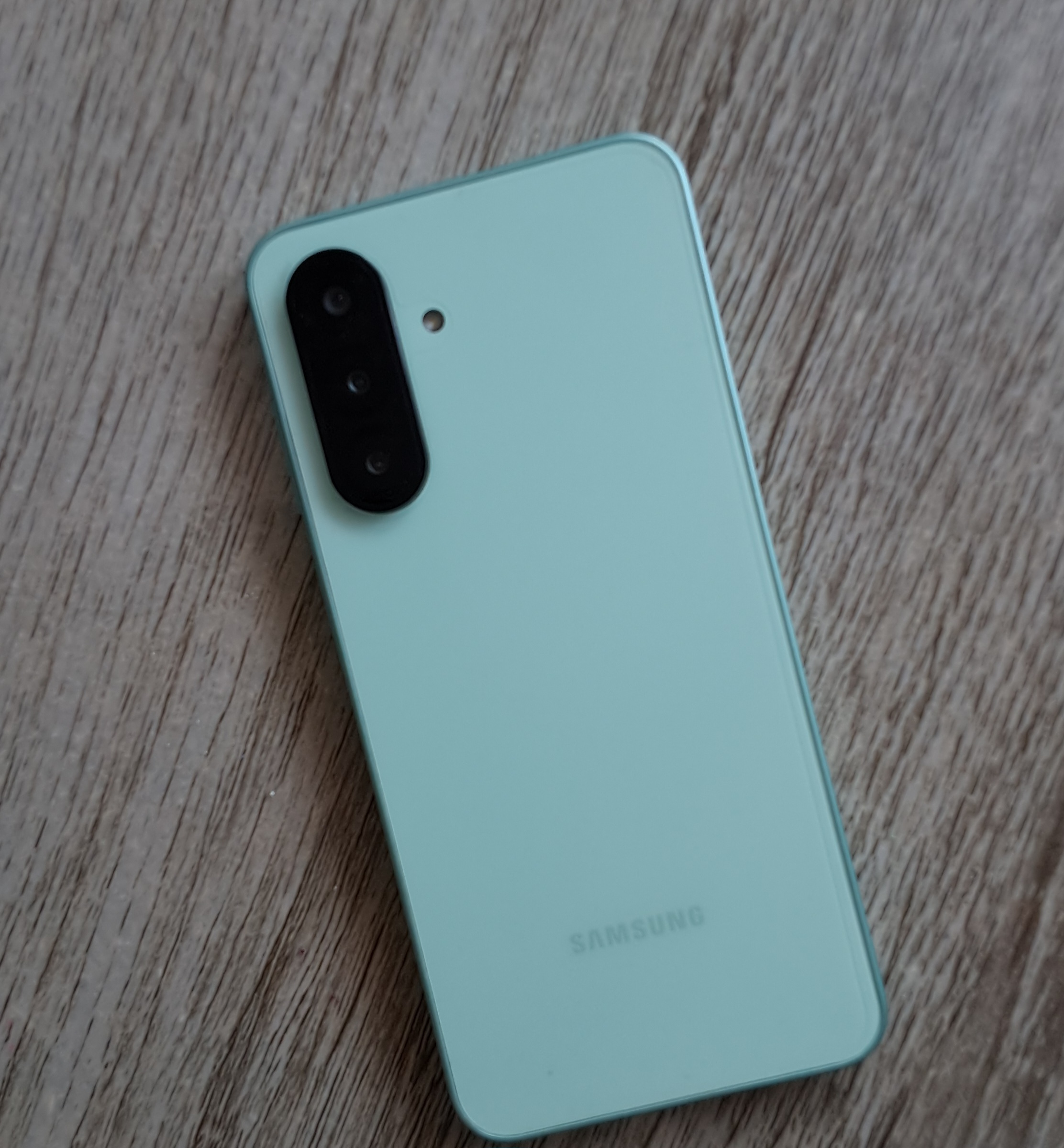
Rear of Galaxy A26 5G in Mint Color

The front and the back is made of Corning Gorilla Glass Victus+ and has a plastic frame. The phone has a IP67 water and dust resistance rating, a first for the A2x lineup. It has a Key Island design with a flat frame, same as its predecessor.

Galaxy A26 5G
- Peach Pink
- White
- Mint
- Black

=== Hardware ===
==== Display ====
The phone features a 6.7 in (170 mm), with an Infinity-U Display, 1080 x 2340 px resolution, 19.5:9 ratio (~385 ppi density), and Super AMOLED with 120Hz refresh rate. The front of the phone is similar to that of the Galaxy A16 and Galaxy A06. The display was manufactured by DB GlobalChip, marking the company's first foray into OLED panel production, which debuted in this device.

==== Battery ====
The device have the same 5000mAh battery with 25W Fast Charging support from its predecessor.

==== Processor and memory ====
The phone uses Samsung's Exynos 1380 in most countries and Exynos 1280 in Latin America. The chipsets were first used on the Galaxy A54 5G and the Galaxy A53 5G, respectively. Storage options include either 128GB or 256GB (both use UFS 2.2) while RAM options include 6 GB or 8 GB, both of which are the same from its predecessor. Support for microSD cards is still present.

Camera

The camera setup was carried over from its predecessor (triple rear setup: 50 MP main camera with OIS, 8 MP ultrawide, and 2 MP macro; 13 MP front camera).

Camera		Resolution	Aperture	Video recording resolution
Rear	Wide (main)	50 MP (OIS)	f/1.8	4K@30fps
Rear	Ultra-wide	8 MP	f/2.2	1080p@30fps
Rear	Macro	2 MP	f/2.4	—
Front camera		13 MP	f/2.2	1080p@30fps

==== Ports and connectivity ====
The Galaxy A26 5G has a USB-C 2.0 port on the bottom, a USB-C 2.0 port, 2 microphones, and a loudspeaker. On the left side is the SIM tray and SD card slot. On the right side are the volume and power buttons.

For the first time in the Galaxy A2x line-up (and succeeding A2x models), the 3.5mm headphone jack has been removed.

=== Software ===
Like the Galaxy A56 and the Galaxy A36, the Galaxy A26 is also set to receive 6 OS upgrades and 6 years of security updates (until 2031; which is a first for the A2x line up). It also has AI features dubbed "Awesome Intelligence".

	Pre-installed OS	OS Upgrades history						End of support
	Pre-installed OS	1st	2nd	3rd	4th	5th	6th	End of support
A26 5G	Android 15 (One UI 7.0)	Android 16 (One UI 8.0); September 2025 (One UI 8.5); May 2026	Android 17 (One UI 9.0); October 2026					Within 2031
