= Samsung Galaxy F15 5G =

2024 online-exclusive smartphone by Samsung Electronics

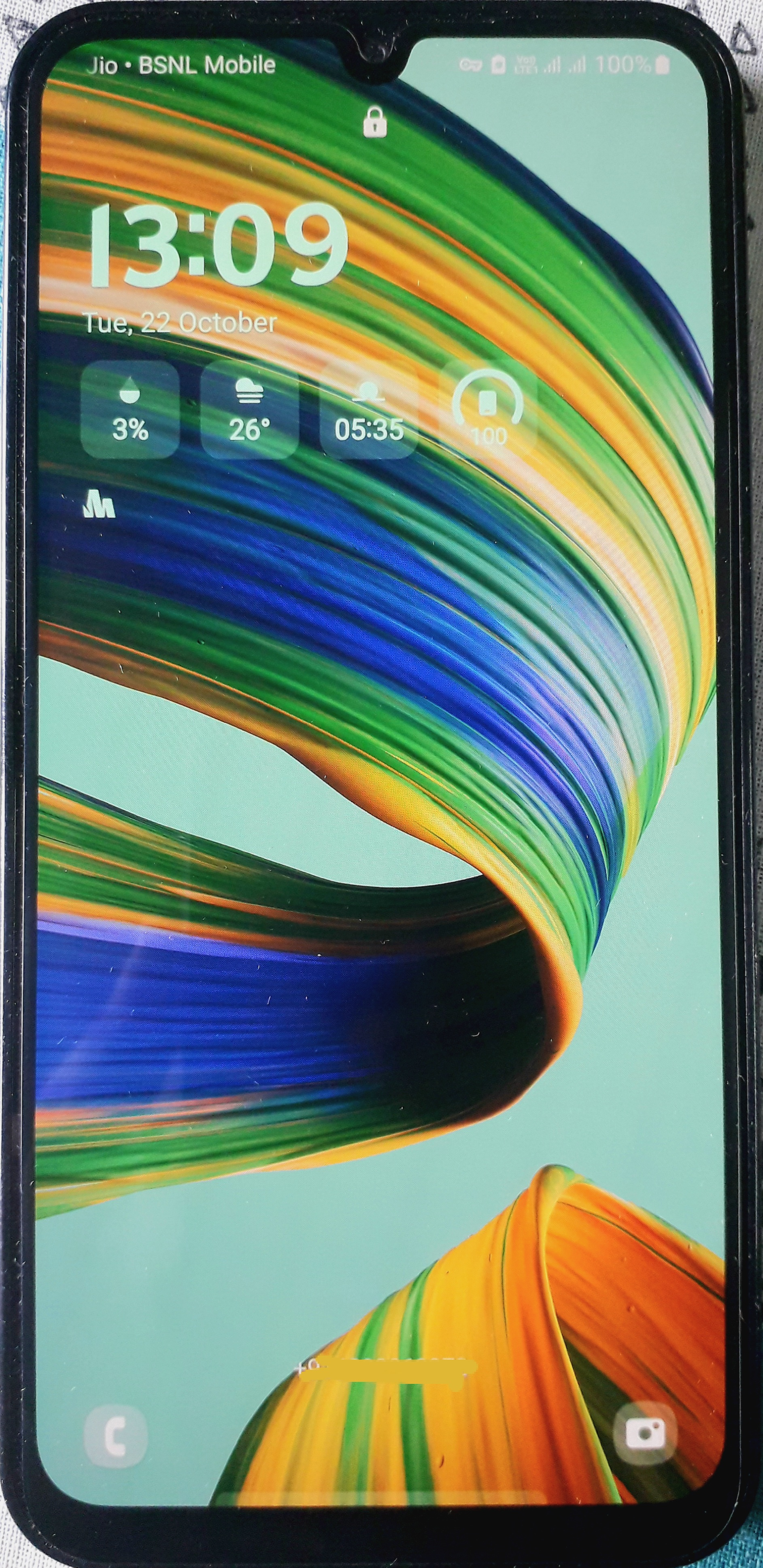
- Samsung Galaxy F15 5G
- Brand: Samsung
- Manufacturer: Samsung Electronics
- Type: Smartphone
- Series: Galaxy F
- Family: Samsung Galaxy
- First released: March 4, 2024; 2 years ago
- Availability by region: India
- Predecessor: Samsung Galaxy F14 5G
- Successor: Samsung Galaxy F16 5G
- Related: Samsung Galaxy F05; Samsung Galaxy F55 5G
- Compatible networks: 2G, 3G, 4G (LTE+), 5G
- Form factor: Slate
- Colors: Ash Black; Groovy Violet; Jazzy Green
- Weight: 217 g (7.7 oz)
- Operating system: Original: Android 14 with One UI 6.0; Current: Android 16 QPR2 with One UI 8.5
- CPU: 2.2 GHz MediaTek MT6835, octa-core
- GPU: Mali-G57 MC2
- Memory: 4; 6; 8 GB
- Storage: 128 GB
- Removable storage: microSDXC class 10 (supports up to 1 TB)
- SIM: nanoSIM (hybrid, dual stand-by)
- Battery: 6000 mAh (non-replaceable)
- Charging: Fast charging up to 25W
- Rear camera: 50 MP, f/1.8, (wide), AF; 5 MP, f/2.2, (ultrawide); 2 MP, f/2.4, (macro)
- Front camera: 13 MP, f/2.0, (wide)
- Display: 6.6 in (170 mm) FHD+ Super AMOLED, 90Hz; 1080 x 2340 px, 19.5:9 aspect-ratio
- Model: SM-E156B, SM-E156B/DS
- Website: Galaxy F15 5G

The Samsung Galaxy F15 5G is a low-range online-exclusive Android-based smartphone manufactured, developed and designed by Samsung Electronics, as part of its Galaxy F series. It was announced and released on March 4, 2024 in India and was available in the international market on March 11, 2024.

Galaxy F15 5G has a 6000 mAh battery, 50 MP main camera, as well as an ultra-wide and depth sensor, and a 6.6-inch Super AMOLED display.

== Specifications ==
=== Software ===
Galaxy F15 5G was shipped with Android 14 with One UI 6.0. Its first update of One UI was version 6.1 which was released in September 2024. Samsung has promised 4 years of major Android OS and security updates and 1 additional year of only security updates for a total of 5 years worth of updates.

=== Hardware ===
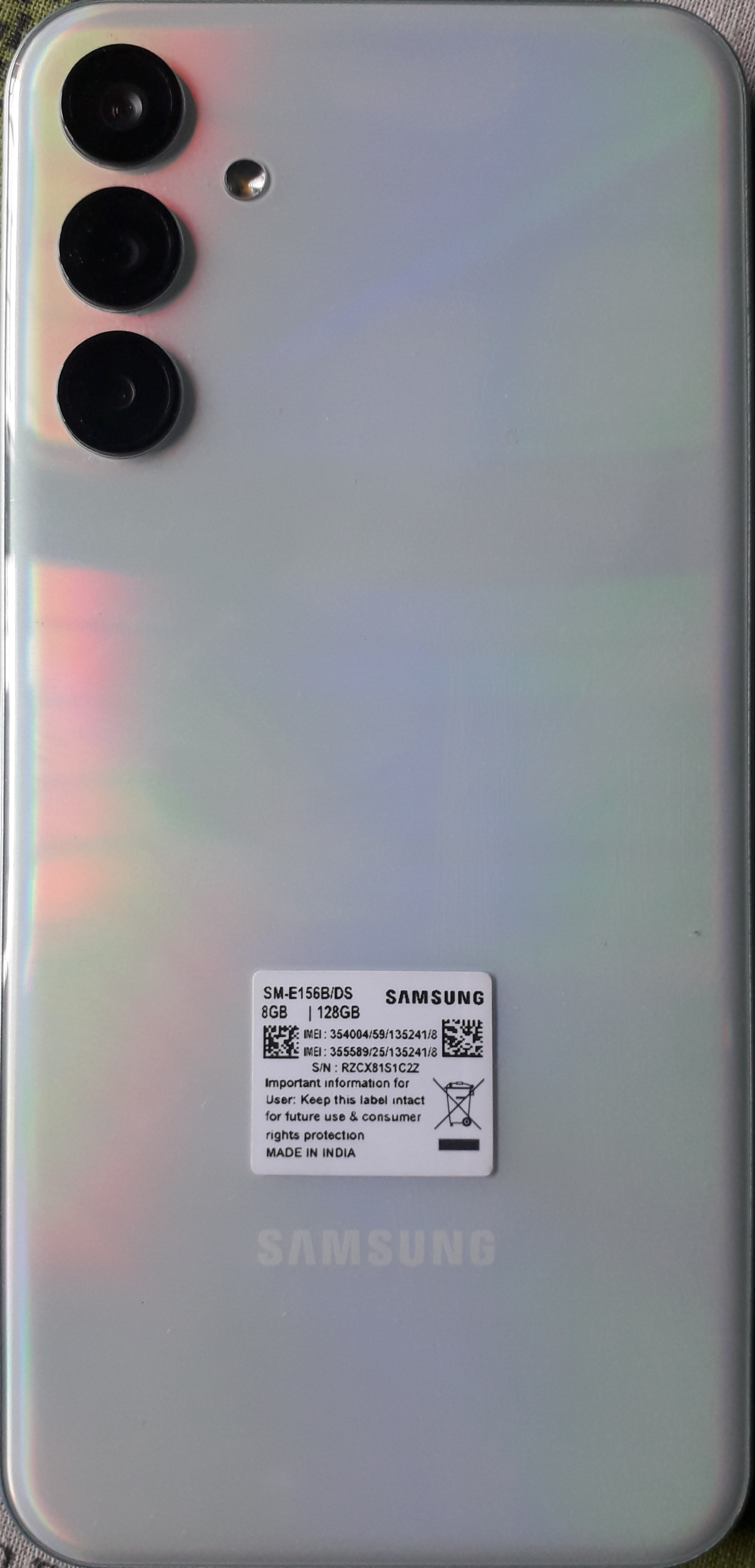
Back side of Galaxy F15 5G

Galaxy F15 5G is powered with MediaTek Dimension 6100+ system-on-chip with 7 nm process, an integrated 5G modem, an octa-core CPU consisting of a high-performance cluster with 2×2.2 GHz MediaTek MT6835 processor.

It has a 6000 mAh non-removable battery with 25W fast charging support using USB type-C charging adapter. It has in-build Bluetooth version 5.3. Furthermore, it has a triple rear camera of 50 MP (wide), 5 MP (ultra-wide) and 2 MP (macro) with 1080p@30 fps full HD Video Recording and a 13 MP Front Camera.

The Galaxy F15 5G has biometric capabilities—a fingerprint sensor side-mounted on the lock key and a face recognition on the front camera.

Galaxy F15 5G has a Water Drop Notch display of 6.6-inch Super AMOLED Screen with full HD resolution of 1080×2340 pixels (399 PPI) under 90 Hz Refresh Rate.

=== Design ===
Galaxy F15 5G has a thickness of 9.3 mm and weighs 217g. It offers three colors — Jazzy Green, Groovy Violet and Ash Black.
