= Samsung Galaxy F04 =

2023 Android smartphone by Samsung Electronics

- Brand: Samsung
- Manufacturer: Samsung Electronics
- Type: Smartphone
- Series: Galaxy F
- Family: Samsung Galaxy
- First released: January 4, 2023; 3 years ago
- Availability by region: January 12, 2023; 3 years ago
- Predecessor: Samsung Galaxy F02s
- Successor: Samsung Galaxy F05
- Compatible networks: 2G / 3G / 4G LTE
- Form factor: Slate
- Colors: Jade Purple, Opal Green
- Dimensions: 164.2 mm (6.46 in) H 75.9 mm (2.99 in) W 9.1 mm (0.36 in) D
- Weight: 188 g (6.6 oz)
- Operating system: Android 13 with One UI Core 5.0
- System-on-chip: Mediatek MT6765 Helio P35 (12nm)
- CPU: Octa-core (4x2.35 GHz Cortex-A53 & 4x1.8 GHz Cortex-A53)
- GPU: PowerVR GE8320
- Memory: 4 GB RAM
- Storage: 64 GB
- Removable storage: microSDXC
- SIM: Dual SIM (Nano-SIM, dual stand-by)
- Battery: Li-Po 5000 mAh
- Charging: Fast charging 15W
- Rear camera: 13 MP, f/2.2, (wide), AF; 2 MP, f/2.4, (depth); LED flash 1080p@30fps
- Front camera: 5 MP, f/2.2 1080p@30fps
- Display: 6.5 in (170 mm), Infinity-V Display; 720 x 1600 px resolution, 20:9 ratio (~270 ppi density); PLS LCD
- Sound: Yes
- Connectivity: Wi-Fi 802.11 b/g/n, Wi-Fi Direct; Bluetooth 5.0, A2DP, LE
- Data inputs: Multi-touch screen USB Type-C 2.0; Accelerometer; Proximity sensor
- Water resistance: No
- Model: SM-E045F, SM-E045F/DS
- SAR: 0.38 W/kg (head)
- Website: Galaxy F04

The Samsung Galaxy F04 is an entry-level Android-based smartphone designed, manufactured and developed by Samsung Electronics. It was announced on January 4, 2023 and released on January 12, 2023.
