= Samsung Galaxy A36 5G =

2025 Android-based smartphone by Samsung

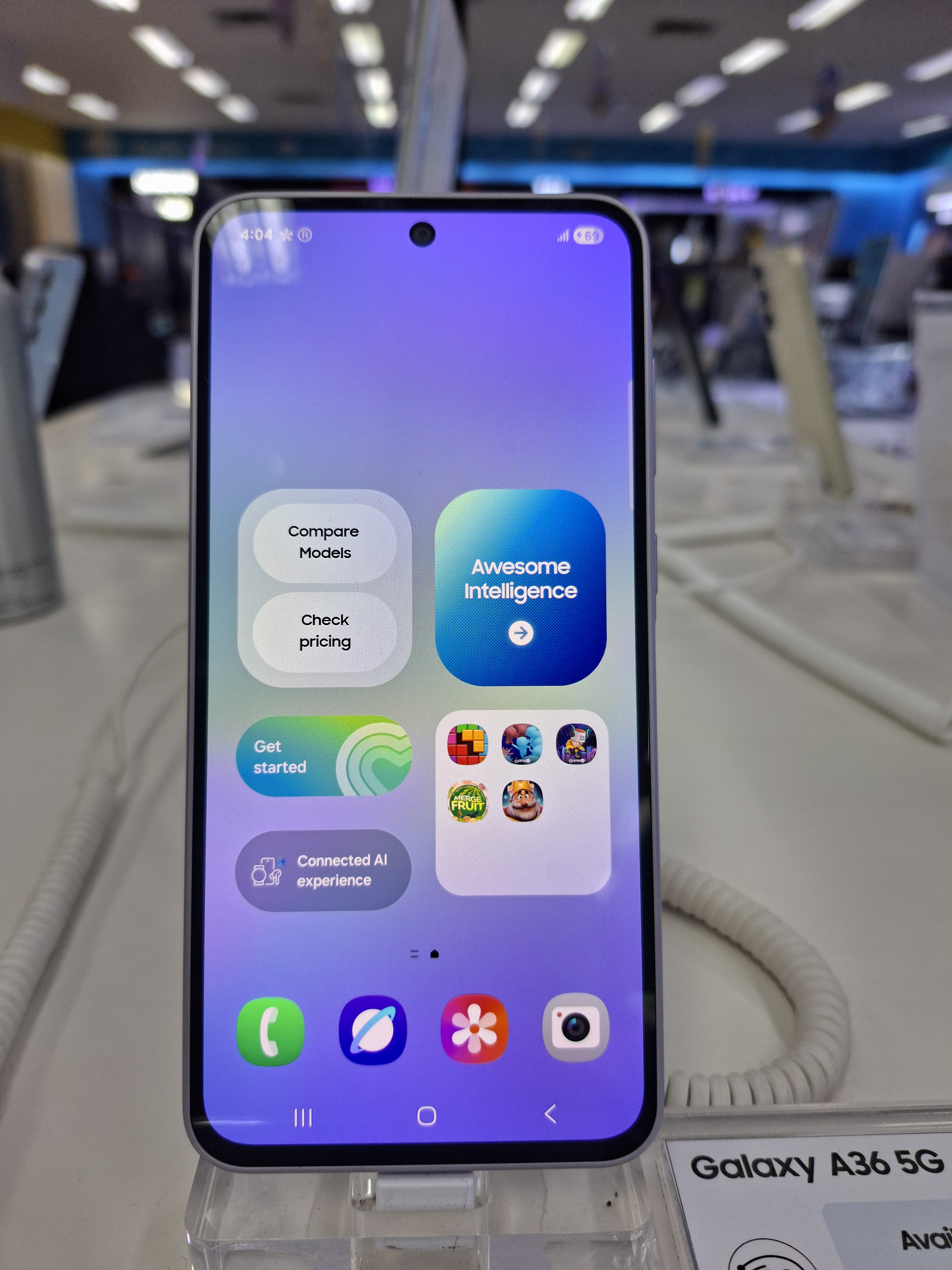
- Brand: Samsung
- Manufacturer: Samsung Electronics
- Type: Smartphone
- Series: Samsung Galaxy A series
- Predecessor: Samsung Galaxy A35 5G
- Successor: Samsung Galaxy A37 5G
- Related: Samsung Galaxy A06; Samsung Galaxy A16; Samsung Galaxy A26 5G; Samsung Galaxy A56 5G
- Compatible networks: List: Technology: GSM / HSPA / LTE / 5G; 2G bands: GSM 850 / 900 / 1800 / 1900; 3G bands: HSDPA 850 / 900 / 1700(AWS) / 1900 / 2100; 4G bands (LTE): 1, 2, 3, 4, 5, 7, 8, 12, 17, 20, 25, 26, 28, 32, 38, 40, 41, 66 - International; 1, 2, 3, 4, 5, 7, 12, 13, 14, 20, 25, 26, 28, 29, 30, 38, 39, 40, 41, 48, 66, 71 - USA; 5G bands: 1, 3, 5, 7, 8, 20, 28, 38, 40, 41, 66, 77, 78 SA/NSA/Sub6 - International; 2, 5, 25, 41, 66, 71, 77, 78 SA/NSA/Sub6/mmWave - USA; Speed: HSPA, LTE, 5G
- Form factor: Slate
- Dimensions: 162.9 x 78.2 x 7.4 mm (6.41 x 3.08 x 0.29 in)
- Weight: 195 g (6.88 oz)
- Operating system: Original: Android 15 with One UI 7 Current: Android 17 with One UI 9.0
- System-on-chip: Qualcomm Snapdragon 6 Gen 3
- CPU: Octa-core (4x2.4 GHz Cortex-A78 & 4x1.8 GHz Cortex-A55)
- GPU: Adreno 710
- Memory: 6 / 8 and 12 GB RAM
- Storage: 128 and 256 GB
- SIM: Nano-SIM and eSIM, dual SIM and dual eSIM support
- Battery: 5,000 mAh
- Charging: Fast charging up to 45W
- Rear camera: Triple-Camera Setup; Primary: Sony IMX 882; 50 MP, f/1.8, 25mm, FoV 82°, 1/1.96", 0.8µm, PDAF, OIS; Ultrawide: GalaxyCore GC08A3; 8 MP, f/2.2, 16mm, FoV 108.7°, 1/4.0", 1.12μm; Macro: GalaxyCore GC05A3; 5 MP, f/2.4, 1/5.0", 1.12μm, fixed focus; Camera features: LED flash, panorama, HDR; Video recording: 4K@30fps, 1080p@30/60fps, gyro-EIS
- Front camera: GalaxyCore GC12A2; 12 MP, f/2.2, 25mm (wide), FoV 80.6°, 1/3.2", 1.12µm; Video recording: 4K@30fps, 1080p@30fps, 10-bit HDR
- Display: Super AMOLED, 120Hz, 1200 nits (HBM), 1900 nits (peak), 6.7 inches, 1080 x 2340 pixels, Corning Gorilla Glass Victus+
- Sound: Stereo speakers
- Water resistance: IP67, up to 1 m (3.3 ft) for 30 minutes

The Samsung Galaxy A36 5G is a mid-range Android-based smartphone developed and manufactured by Samsung Electronics as a part of its Galaxy A series. It was announced along with the Galaxy A56 5G and Galaxy A26 5G on 2 March 2025. It was unveiled at MWC, Barcelona on 1 March and later in India on 3 March.

== Specifications ==
=== Design ===
The front and back is made of Corning Gorilla Glass Victus+ and the frame is made of plastic. The Galaxy A36 5G continues to feature IP67 dust and water resistance. Alongside other models in the Ax6 series, it continues to feature a flat frame and the Key Island. It also introduces a single camera module design.

Galaxy A36 5G
- Awesome Lavender
- Awesome White
- Awesome Lime
- Awesome Black

=== Hardware ===
==== Display ====
The phone features a 6.7 in (170 mm), with an Infinity-O Display, 1080 x 2340 px resolution, 19.5:9 ratio (~385 ppi density), and Super AMOLED with 120Hz refresh rate.

==== Battery ====
The device have the same 5000mAh battery capacity from its predecessor, but upgraded its charging speed up to 45W Fast Charging (alongside the Galaxy A56 5G, a first for the Galaxy A series).

==== Processor and memory ====
The A36 uses the Qualcomm Snapdragon 6 Gen 3 chipset. It marks the first time Samsung used a Qualcomm chipset on the Galaxy A series since the Galaxy A05s. Storage options include either 128GB or 256GB (both with UFS 2.2) while RAM options include 6 GB, 8 GB or 12 GB, with the latter being a first for the Galaxy A3x series. It is the first iteration of the Galaxy A3x series that no longer has a microSD card slot.

Camera

The rear camera setup was carried over from its predecessor (50 MP main camera, 8 MP ultrawide, and 2 MP macro). A slight upgrade was made on the front camera, 12 MP (with 10-bit HDR) versus 13 MP from its predecessors.

Camera		Resolution	Aperture	Video recording resolution
Rear	Wide (main)	50 MP (OIS)	f/1.8	4K@30fps
Rear	Ultra-wide	8 MP	f/2.2	1080p@30fps
Rear	Macro	5 MP	f/2.4	—
Front camera		12 MP	f/2.2	4K@30fps

==== Ports and connectivity ====
On the bottom of the smartphone, there is a USB-C 2.0 port, two microphones and a stereo speakers. On the top, there is an additional microphone and a dual SIM tray (SIM 1 + SIM 2 or SIM 1 + eSIM 1 or dual eSIM — eSIM compatibility depends on region). On the right side, there is the volume rocker and the power button. Like its predecessors, the A36 5G doesn't have the headphone jack.

=== Software ===
Like the Galaxy A26 5G and the Galaxy A56 5G, it has Android 15 with One UI 7 pre-installed. It will get 6 OS updates and 6 years of security updates (until 2031). Initially, security updates were set to end by 2031, but was quietly extended by 1 year (until March 2032). Like its A5x counterparts, it is the first Galaxy A3x device to support Google's Seamless Updates (which it works by installing updates to a secondary system partition that the device boots from whenever it is restarted).

	Pre-installed OS	OS Upgrades history						End of support
	Pre-installed OS	1st	2nd	3rd	4th	5th	6th	End of support
A36 5G	Android 15 (One UI 7.0)	Android 16 (One UI 8.0); September 2025 (One UI 8.5); May 2026	Android 17 (One UI 9.0); October 2026					March 2032
