= M54 =

M54 or M-54 may be:

Roads:

- M54 motorway, a motorway in England also known as the Telford Motorway
- M-54 (Michigan highway), a state highway in Michigan
- M54 (Cape Town), a Metropolitan Route in Cape Town, South Africa
- M54 (Johannesburg), a Metropolitan Route in Johannesburg, South Africa

Vehicles:

- BMW M54, a 2000 automobile engine
- M54 (truck), a heavy truck used by the United States armed forces

Astronomy:

- Messier 54, a globular cluster in the constellation Sagittarius

Other:

- Samsung Galaxy M54 5G, a mid-range Android smartphone
