= Samsung Galaxy A56 5G =

2025 mid-range smartphone by Samsung Electronics

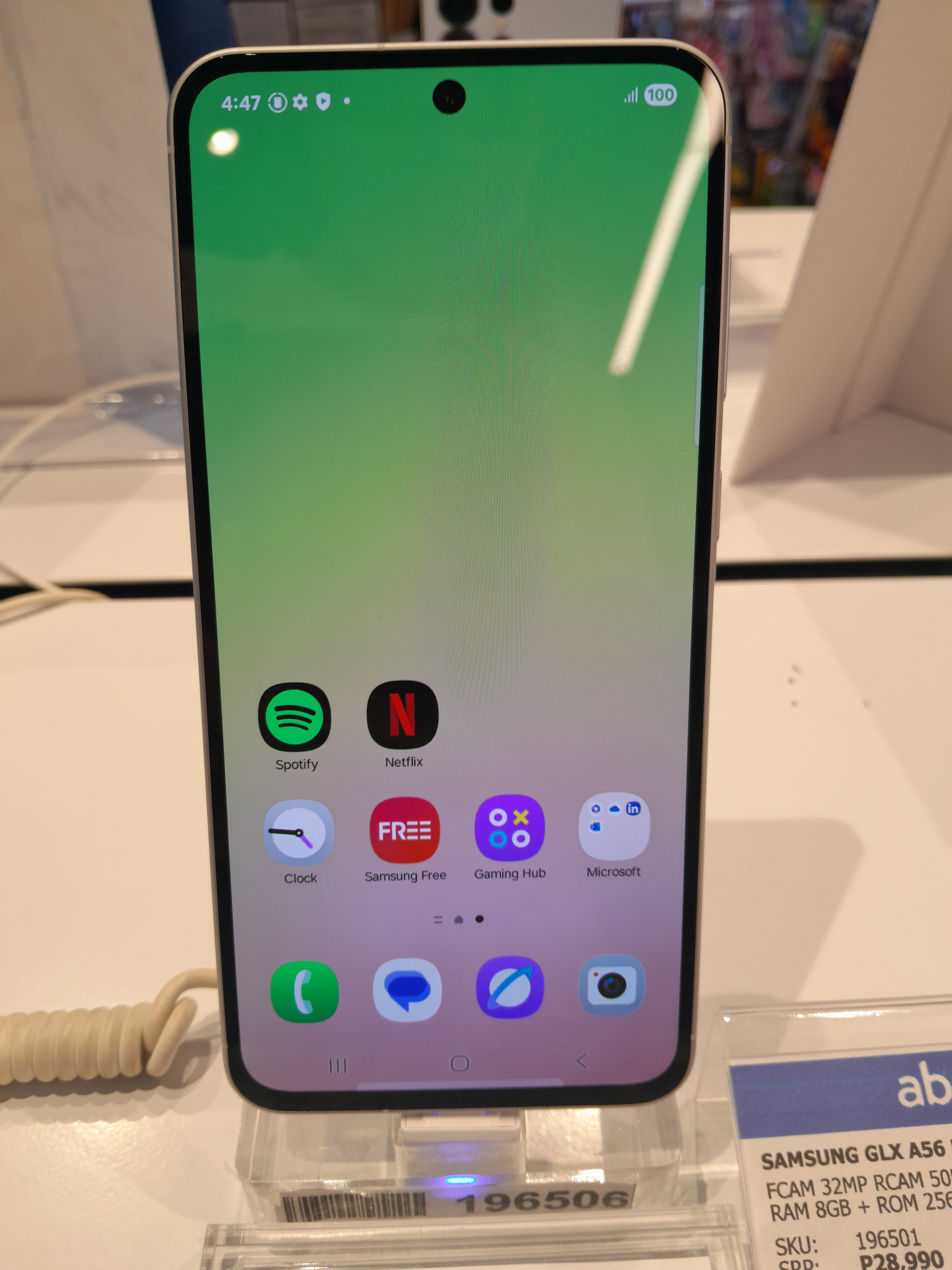
- Also sold as: Galaxy Quantum 6 (in South Korea)
- Brand: Samsung
- Manufacturer: Samsung Electronics
- Type: Smartphone
- Series: Galaxy A
- Family: Samsung Galaxy
- First released: March 2, 2025; 20 months ago
- Availability by region: March 19, 2025; 19 months ago
- Predecessor: Samsung Galaxy A55 5G
- Successor: Samsung Galaxy A57 5G
- Related: Samsung Galaxy A06; Samsung Galaxy A16; Samsung Galaxy A26 5G; Samsung Galaxy A36 5G
- Colors: Awesome Pink; Awesome Light Gray; Awesome Olive; Awesome Graphite
- Dimensions: 162.2 mm (6.39 in) H 77.5 mm (3.05 in) W 7.4 mm (0.29 in) D
- Weight: 198 g (7.0 oz)
- Operating system: Original: Android 15 with One UI 7.0; Current: Android 17 with One UI 9.0
- System-on-chip: Exynos 1580
- CPU: Octa-core (1x 2.9 GHz - Cortex-A720,3x 2.6 GHz - Cortex-A720, 4x 1.95 GHz - Cortex-A520)
- GPU: Xclipse 540
- Memory: 8 GB / 12 GB RAM
- Storage: 128 GB / 256 GB; no SD slot
- SIM: eSIM, nanoSIM
- Battery: 5,000 mAh
- Charging: Fast Charging up to 45W
- Rear camera: Triple-Camera Setup; Primary: Sony IMX 906; 50 MP, f/1.8, 23mm, FoV 85.3°, 1/1.56", 1.0 μm, PDAF, OIS; Ultrawide: Sony IMX 258; 12 MP, f/2.2, 13mm, FoV 116.3°, 1/3.06", 1.12 μm; Macro: 5 MP, f/2.4, fixed focus; Camera features: Best Face, LED flash, Panorama, HDR; Video recording: 4K@30fps, 1080p@30/60fps, gyro-EIS
- Front camera: Samsung S5K3LC; 12 MP, f/2.2, 25mm (wide), FoV 82.7°, 1/3.2", 1.12 μm Video recording: 4K@30fps, 1080p@30fps, 1080p@60fps (regional availability), 10-bit HDR
- Display: 6.7-inch Full HD+ Super AMOLED (1080 x 2340 pixels)
- Sound: Stereo Speakers
- Connectivity: 5G, Wi-Fi 6, Bluetooth 5.3, NFC, GNSS
- Water resistance: IP67 dust/water-resistant (up to 1m for 30 min)

The Samsung Galaxy A56 5G (sold in South Korea as the Galaxy Quantum6) is a mid-range Android-based smartphone manufactured and developed by Samsung Electronics, as part of the mid-range Galaxy A series, announced on March 2, 2025, alongside the Galaxy A26 5G and the Galaxy A36 5G. It is the successor to the Galaxy A55 5G, and it brings a range of upgrades in terms of design, performance, and camera capabilities.

== Specifications ==
=== Design ===
The Galaxy A56 5G has an aluminum frame with Corning Gorilla Glass Victus+ on both the front and back. The device is IP67 rated, meaning it is water and dust resistant for up to 1 metre for 30 minutes in lab conditions.

Galaxy A56 5G
- Awesome Pink
- Awesome Light Gray
- Awesome Olive
- Awesome Graphite

=== Hardware ===
==== Display ====
The phone features a 6.7-inch FHD+ Super AMOLED display with a 120 Hz refresh rate with HDR10+ support. The screen has a peak brightness of 1200 nits (HBM) and 1900 nits (peak). It is protected by Gorilla Glass Victus+.

==== Battery ====
The Galaxy A56 5G is equipped with a 5000 mAh battery, like its predecessors. The device is one of the first in the Galaxy A series that supports 45 W fast charging along with Galaxy A36 5G.

==== Processor and memory ====
The Galaxy A56 5G is powered by the 4 nm Exynos 1580 chipset, which features the Xclipse 540 graphics processing unit, co-developed with AMD and based on the RDNA 3 architecture. It is paired with 8 GB or 12 GB of RAM and 128 GB or 256 GB of internal storage (both with UFS 3.1). However, it is the first A5x device that no longer supports expandable storage via microSD.

==== Camera ====
The device features the same rear triple-camera setup from its predecessor: 50 MP main with OIS, 12 MP ultrawide, 5 MP macro. Its front camera now has a 12 MP sensor, a fewer megapixel difference from its predecessor but an upgrade on quality. Like its predecessor, It can record videos up to 4K@30fps and 1080p@60fps at both rear and front. The device is the first in the Galaxy A series to support 10-bit HDR video recording.

The camera system on the Samsung Galaxy A56 has AI capabilities including enhanced subject detection in portrait mode, that can result in a bokeh effect in images. The AI features also support functions like Object Eraser, letting users edit photos with more flexibility from the device.

=== Software ===
The Galaxy A56 5G has Android 15 with One UI 7.0 pre-installed. At the Mobile World Congress 2025 in Barcelona, the new A56 alongside the A36, A26 and A16, were announced to receive 6 Android OS upgrades and 6 years of security updates. Initially, security updates were set to end by 2031, but was quietly extended by 1 year (until March 2032).

	Pre-installed OS	OS Upgrades history						End of support
	Pre-installed OS	1st	2nd	3rd	4th	5th	6th	End of support
A56 5G	Android 15 (One UI 7.0)	Android 16 (One UI 8.0); September 2025 (One UI 8.5); May 2026	Android 17 (One UI 9.0); October 2026					March 2032

Preceded by Samsung Galaxy A55 5G	Samsung Galaxy A56 5G; 2025	Succeeded by Samsung Galaxy A57 5G
