= Samsung Galaxy Tab S11 =

2025 flagship tablets by Samsung Electronics

Samsung Galaxy Tab S11 series

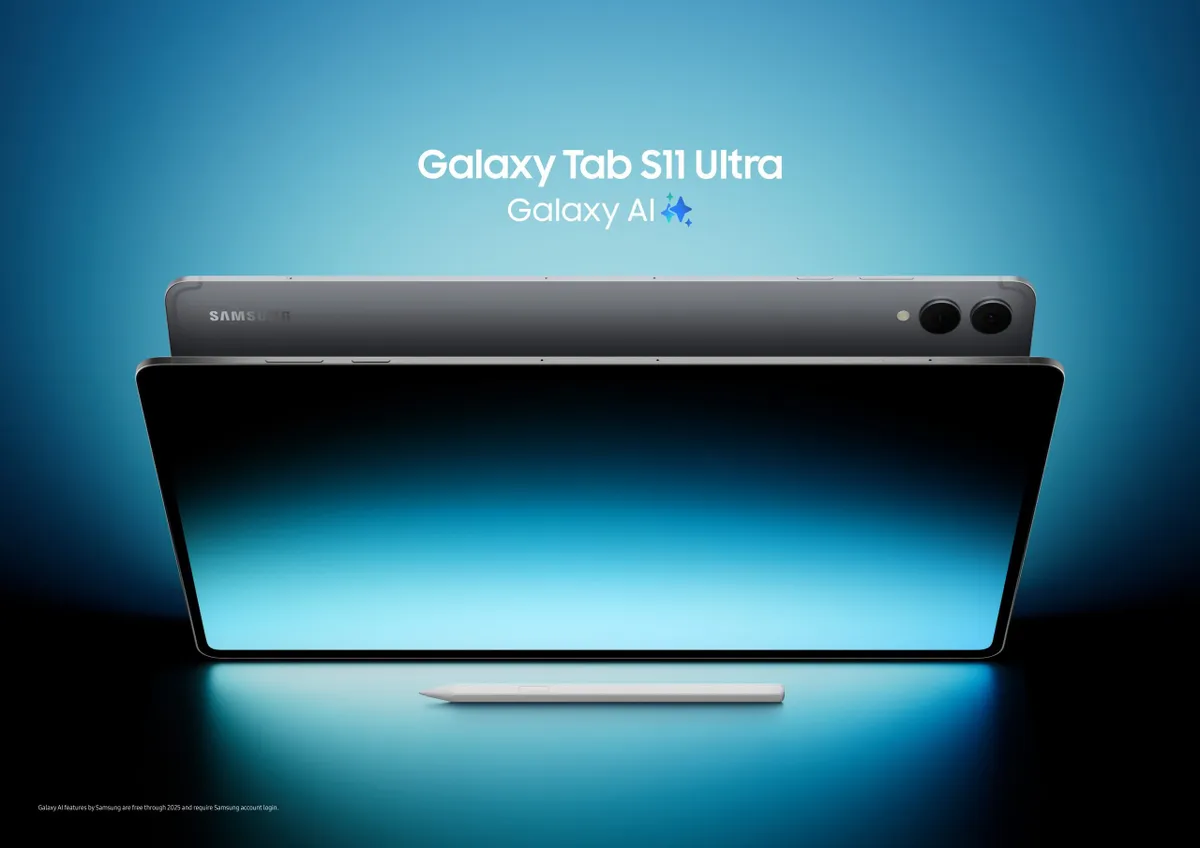
- Galaxy Tab S11 Ultra in Gray
- Brand: Samsung
- Manufacturer: Samsung Electronics
- Type: Tablet computer
- Series: Galaxy Tab S
- Family: Samsung Galaxy
- First released: September 19, 2025; 13 months ago
- Availability by region: September 19, 2025; 13 months ago
- Discontinued: September 30, 2026; 31 days ago
- Predecessor: Samsung Galaxy Tab S10
- Successor: Samsung Galaxy Tab S12
- Compatible networks: Cellular: GSM/HSPA/4G LTE/5G (sub-6GHz)
- Form factor: Bar
- Colors: Gray; Silver
- Dimensions: Tab S11: 165.3 × 253.8 × 5.5 mm Tab S11 Ultra: 208.5 × 326.3 × 5.1 mm
- Weight: Tab S11: 469 g Tab S11 Ultra: 692 g
- Operating system: Original: Android 16 with One UI 8.0; Current: Android 17 with One UI 9.0
- System-on-chip: MediaTek Dimensity 9400+ (3 nm)
- CPU: Octa-core (1x3.63 GHz Cortex-X925 & 3x3.3 GHz Cortex-X4 & 4x2.4 GHz Cortex-A720)
- GPU: Immortalis-G925
- Memory: Tab S11: 12 GB RAM; Tab S11 Ultra: 12 GB, 16 GB RAM
- Storage: Tab S11: 128 GB, 256 GB, 512 GB; Tab S11 Ultra: 256 GB, 512 GB, 1 TB
- Removable storage: Dedicated microSDXC slot
- SIM: Nano-SIM/eSIM (Cellular models only)
- Battery: Tab S11: 8400 mAh non-user replaceable LiPo; Tab S11 Ultra: 11600 mAh non-user replaceable LiPo
- Charging: 45 W USB PD charging
- Rear camera: Single-Camera Setup Tab S11: OmniVision PureCel®Plus‑S OV13A10; 13 MP, f/2.0, 26mm (wide), FoV 80.4°, 1/3.4", 1.0 µm, AF; Dual-Camera Setup Tab S11 Ultra: Primary: OmniVision PureCel®Plus‑S OV13A10; 13 MP, f/2.0, 26mm (wide), FoV 80.4°, 1/3.4", 1.0 µm, AF; Ultrawide: Hynix Hi-847; 8 MP, f/2.2, 16mm, FoV 120°, 1/4.4", 1.0 µm, FF; Camera features: All: LED flash, HDR, Panorama; Video recording: All: 4K@30fps, 1080p@30fps
- Front camera: All: OmniVision PureCel®Plus‑S OV13A10F; 12 MP, f/2.2, 15mm, 120° (ultrawide), 1/3.4", 1.0 µm, FF; Camera features: HDR; Video recording: 4K@30fps, 1080p@30fps
- Website: Galaxy Tab S11

The Samsung Galaxy Tab S11 is a series of Android-based tablets manufactured, developed, designed and marketed by Samsung Electronics, as part of its flagship Galaxy Tab S series, unveiled at the Galaxy Unpacked event on September 4, 2025 and released on September 19, 2025 alongside the Galaxy S25 FE, and made available on the same day. This iteration brings back the base 11-inch model and removes the Plus (+) model, which was 12.4 inches, while the Ultra variation remains in the lineup.

== Features ==
=== Design ===
The tablets still use the same aluminum body of their predecessors, but with a thinner design (5.1 mm for the Tab S11 Ultra and 5.5 mm for the base Tab S11) and are available in only two colors. The included S Pen also brings a redesign, now in a hexagonal shape (mimicking a pencil), instead of the curved shape included on the previous Tab S models.

Model	Galaxy Tab S11 and Galaxy Tab S11 Ultra
Base; Colors	Gray; Silver

=== Display ===
The Ultra model retains the resolution (1848 x 2960), panel type (Dynamic AMOLED 2X display with 120 Hz refresh rate), and its anti-reflective coating from its predecessor, Galaxy Tab S10 Ultra, with the only change being the brightness increase, from 930 nits to 1600 nits.

The smaller variant also retains the resolution (1600 x 2560) and panel type (Dynamic AMOLED 2X display with 120 Hz refresh rate) from its predecessor, Galaxy Tab S9, with the only change being the brightness increase, from 750 nits to 1600 nits.

=== Performance ===
Both tablets use the MediaTek Dimensity 9400+ chipset, an 8-core chipset with 3 nm node and an Immortalis-G925 GPU. The smaller variant is only sold in a single 12 GB RAM option, while internal storage options ranges from 128 GB to 512 GB (all use UFS 4.0). The Ultra model are sold in either 12 GB or 16 GB of RAM, while storage options range from 256 GB to 1 TB (all use UFS 4.0). Regardless of the model, it has support for microSD cards.

=== Cameras ===
The Tab S11 and Tab S11 Ultra feature a 13 MP wide rear camera with a 26mm focal length and an f/2.0 aperture. Additionally, the Tab S11 Ultra also has an 8 MP ultrawide rear camera with an f/2.2 aperture. Both models come with 4K@30fps and 1080p@30fps recording capabilities.

Both tablets come with a 12MP 120° ultrawide front camera, with the Tab S11 Ultra losing the 12 MP wide front camera of its predecessor.

=== Software ===
The Galaxy Tab S11 and Tab S11 Ultra were the first Galaxy tablets to have Android 16 (One UI 8) pre-installed and will receive 7 years of software and security updates (with support ending within 2032).

	Pre-installed OS	OS Upgrades history							End of support
	Pre-installed OS	1st	2nd	3rd	4th	5th	6th	7th	End of support
Tab S11; Tab S11 Ultra	Android 16 (One UI 8.0) Minor One UI update: (One UI 8.5); May 2026	Android 17 (One UI 9.0); October 2026							Expected within 2032
