= Samsung Galaxy F42 5G =

2021 online-exclusive mid-range smartphone by Samsung Electronics

- Also known as: Galaxy Wide5 (in South Korea)
- Brand: Samsung
- Manufacturer: Samsung Electronics
- Type: Smartphone
- Series: Galaxy F
- Family: Samsung Galaxy
- First released: October 3, 2021; 4 years ago
- Availability by region: October 3, 2021; 4 years ago
- Predecessor: Samsung Galaxy F41; Samsung Galaxy Wide4
- Successor: Samsung Galaxy Wide6
- Related: Samsung Galaxy A22; Samsung Galaxy F22; Samsung Galaxy F52 5G; Samsung Galaxy F62
- Compatible networks: 2G, 3G, 4G, 5G
- Form factor: Bar
- Dimensions: 167.2 mm (6.58 in) H 76.4 mm (3.01 in) W 9 mm (0.35 in) D
- Weight: 203 g (7.2 oz)
- Operating system: Original: Android 11 with One UI 3.1; Current: Android 13 with One UI 5.1
- System-on-chip: MediaTek MT6833 Dimensity 700 5G (7 nm)
- CPU: Octa-core (2x2.2 GHz Cortex-A76 & 6x2.0 GHz Cortex-A55)
- GPU: Mali-G57 MC2
- Memory: 6GB, 8GB
- Storage: 128GB
- Removable storage: microSDXC
- SIM: Dual SIM (Nano-SIM, dual stand-by)
- Battery: Li-Po 5000 mAh
- Charging: Fast charging 15W
- Rear camera: 64 MP, f/1.8, (wide), PDAF; 5 MP, f/2.2, 115˚ (ultrawide), 1/5.0", 1.12 μm 2 MP, f/2.4, (depth); LED flash, panorama, HDR; 1152p@30fps
- Front camera: 8 MP, f/2.0, (wide); 1080p@30fps
- Display: 6.6 inches, 104.9 cm2 (~82.1% screen-to-body ratio); TFT, 90Hz; 1080 x 2408 pixels, 20:9 ratio (~400 ppi density)
- Sound: Loudspeaker; 3.5mm jack
- Connectivity: USB Type-C 2.0; Wi-Fi 802.11 a/b/g/n/ac, dual-band, Wi-Fi Direct, hotspot Bluetooth 5.0, A2DP, LE
- Data inputs: Sensors: Fingerprint sensor (side-mounted); Accelerometer; Gyroscope; Proximity sensor Compass
- Model: SM-E426

The Samsung Galaxy F42 5G is a mid-range smartphone manufactured, developed and designed by Samsung Electronics, it was announced on September 29, 2021, and released on October 3, 2021. The phone has a triple-camera setup with a 64 MP main camera as well as a 5 MP front facing camera, a 6.6 inches FHD+ Infinity-V display, and a 5000 mAh Li-Po battery. It ships with Android 11 and is upgradeable to Android 13.
