= Samsung Galaxy F41 =

Mid-range Android phone from Samsung

- Brand: Samsung
- Manufacturer: Samsung Electronics
- Series: Galaxy F series
- First released: October 8, 2020; 5 years ago
- Availability by region: October 16, 2020
- Successor: Samsung Galaxy F42 5G
- Related: Samsung Galaxy M31
- Dimensions: 159.2 mm (6.27 in) H 75.1 mm (2.96 in) W 8.9 mm (0.35 in) D
- Weight: 191 g (6.7 oz)
- Operating system: Original: Android 10, One UI 2.1 Current: Android 12, One UI 4.1
- System-on-chip: Exynos 9611
- CPU: Octa-core (4x2.3 GHz Cortex-A73 & 4x1.7 GHz Cortex-A53)
- GPU: Mali-G72 MP3
- Memory: 6 GB RAM
- Storage: 64 GB, 128 GB UFS 2.1
- Removable storage: up to 512 GB
- Battery: 6000mAh
- Charging: 15W fast charging
- Rear camera: 64MP main; 8MP ultrawide; 5MP depth sensor
- Front camera: 32MP
- Display: 6.4 in (160 mm) super AMOLED Infinity-U Display, 1080 × 2340, 19.5:9 aspect ratio ,~84.1% screen-to-body ratio, ~403 ppi density,
- Connectivity: USB-C, 3.5mm audio jack
- Model: SM-F415FZBD; SM-F415FZBDINS
- Website: www.samsung.com/in/microsite/galaxy-f41/

The Samsung Galaxy F41 is a mid-range Android smartphone manufactured by Samsung Electronics as part of its F series. It is the first phone to be released in the series. The phone has a 6000mAh battery, 64MP main camera, as well as an ultrawide and depth sensor, and a 6.4 in super AMOLED display. It is available in three colours (Fusion Green, Fusion Black and Fusion Blue). It has another version, the Galaxy M21s, released on November 6, 2020, at USA.

== Specifications ==
=== Hardware ===
The Samsung Galaxy F41 has a 6.4in sAMOLED Plus Infinity-U Display with a 1080 x 2340 resolution, a 19.5:9 aspect ratio. The phone is powered by the Exynos 9611 processor. It has either 64 GB or 128 GB of internal storage, which can be expanded up to an additional 512 GB via an SD card and 6 GB or RAM. It comes with a non-removable 6000mAh battery and supports 15W fast-charging. A rear-mounted fingerprint sensor is also present.

==== Cameras ====
The Samsung Galaxy F41 has a triple camera array on the rear, consisting of a 64MP main camera, an 8MP ultrawide camera, and a 5MP depth sensor. The cameras are arranged vertically on the back in the top left corner, with the flash beside the ultrawide camera.

=== Software ===
The Samsung Galaxy F41 comes with Android 10 with One UI 2.1. It can be upgradable up to Android 12 with One UI 4.1.

== History ==
The Galaxy F41 was announced on October 8, 2020, at Samsung's #FullOn Launch Event. It was the first phone to be part of Samsung's F series.
