= Samsung Galaxy F52 5G =

Android smartphone manufactured by Samsung Electronics

- Brand: Samsung Galaxy
- Manufacturer: Samsung
- Type: Smartphone
- Series: Samsung Galaxy F series
- First released: May 20, 2021; 5 years ago
- Successor: Samsung Galaxy F54 5G
- Related: Samsung Galaxy F02s; Samsung Galaxy F12; Samsung Galaxy F22; Samsung Galaxy F42 5G; Samsung Galaxy F62
- Compatible networks: GSM / HSPA / LTE / 5G
- Dimensions: 164.6 mm (6.48 in) H 76.3 mm (3.00 in) W 8.1 mm (0.32 in) D
- Weight: 199 g (7.0 oz)
- Operating system: Original: Android 11 with One UI 3.1; Current: Android 13 with One UI 5.1
- System-on-chip: Qualcomm Snapdragon 750G 5G (8 nm)
- CPU: Octa-core (2x2.2 GHz Kryo 570 & 6x1.8 GHz Kryo 570)
- GPU: Adreno 619
- Memory: 8 GB RAM
- Storage: 128 GB
- Removable storage: microSDXC
- SIM: Hybrid Dual SIM (Nano-SIM, dual stand-by)
- Battery: 4500 mAh
- Charging: Fast charging 25W
- Rear camera: 64 MP, f/1.8, (wide), PDAF; 8 MP, f/2.2, (ultrawide), 1.12 μm 2 MP, f/2.4, (macro); 2 MP, f/2.4, (depth)
- Front camera: 16 MP, f/2.0, (wide)
- Display: 6.6 in (170 mm), 104.9 cm2 (~83.6% screen-to-body ratio); 1080 x 2408 pixels, 20:9 ratio (~400 ppi density)
- Sound: Loudspeaker, 3.5mm jack
- Connectivity: Wi-Fi 802.11 a/b/g/n/ac, dual-band, Wi-Fi Direct, hotspot Bluetooth 5.0, A2DP, LE; A-GPS, GLONASS, GALILEO, BDS
- Data inputs: Multi-touch screen

Samsung Galaxy F52 5G is a mid-range Android smartphone manufactured by Samsung Electronics as part of the Galaxy F series. It is the first 5G-capable device in the Galaxy F series. It was announced in May 2021 in China and is the first phone in the Galaxy F series to be available in China.

== Specifications ==
=== Design ===
Samsung Galaxy F52 5G measures 164.6 × 76.3 × 8.7 mm and weighs 199 grams. It has a 6.6-inch display with a punch hole at the top right for the front-facing camera. Both the frame and the back panel are made of plastic. It has a side-mounted capacitive fingerprint reader that doubles as the power button and a volume rocker at the right, a hybrid dual SIM tray with one of the SIM slots that can be used as a microSD card slot at the left, and a 3.5 mm audio jack, a USB-C port and a microphone at the bottom. It is available in white and black.

=== Hardware ===
Samsung Galaxy F52 5G is powered by the Qualcomm Snapdragon 750G system-on-chip with 8 nm process, an integrated 5G modem, an octa-core CPU consisting of a high-performance cluster with 2×2.2 GHz Kryo 570 Gold (Cortex A77-based) cores and a high-efficiency cluster with 6×1.8 GHz Kryo 570 Silver (Cortex A55-based) cores, and an Adreno 619 GPU. The SoC is paired with 8 GB RAM and 128 GB internal storage that can be expanded through the hybrid SIM/microSD card slot up to 1 TB. It has a quad rear camera setup with a 64 MP main camera, an 8 MP ultrawide camera, a 2 MP macro camera and a 2 MP depth sensor. There is a 16 MP front-facing camera located in the punch hole on the display. It has a 6.6-inch TFT LCD with 1080×2408 pixels resolution, 20:9 aspect ratio, 400 PPI pixel density and 120 Hz refresh rate. It has a 4500 mAh non-removable battery with 25W fast charging support.

=== Software ===
Samsung Galaxy F52 5G is shipped with Android 11 and One UI 3.1, but it can be upgraded up to Android 13 and One UI 5.1.

== Release ==
Samsung Galaxy F52 5G has only been released in China so far. It costs CNY1,999 ($310/€255) in China and is sold with 8 GB RAM and 128 GB internal storage.
