= Samsung Galaxy F series =

Series of mid-range smartphones by Samsung Electronics

- Developer: Samsung Electronics
- Product family: Samsung Galaxy
- Type: Smartphones
- Released: 8 October 2020; 5 years ago
- Operating system: Android
- System on a chip: Exynos (2020–present); Qualcomm Snapdragon (2021–present); MediaTek (2021–present)

The Samsung Galaxy F series is a line of entry-level and mid-range Android-based smartphones manufactured, marketed and developed by Samsung Electronics as part of their Galaxy line. The first model released in the series was the Samsung Galaxy F41, which was launched on 8 October 2020. The line is sold exclusively in India, Bangladesh and China. In India, the series consists of rebranded Galaxy M models sold exclusively for the Indian market through Flipkart.

Galaxy F series release timeline
2020	Samsung Galaxy Fx1
2021	Samsung Galaxy Fx2
2022	Samsung Galaxy Fx3
2023	Samsung Galaxy Fx4
2024	Samsung Galaxy Fx5
2025	Samsung Galaxy Fx6
2026	Samsung Galaxy Fx7

== Phones ==
=== Galaxy Fx1 (2020) ===
Model	Display	Operating System	Processor	Memory	Storage	Rear Camera	Front Camera	Fingerprint Sensor	Battery	Fast Charging
Galaxy F41	6.4" FHD+ sAMOLED (1080 x 2340 pixels)	Android 10; One UI 2	Samsung Exynos 9611	6 GB	64 GB 128 GB	64 MP (Wide) 8 MP (Ultrawide); 5 MP (Depth)	32 MP	Rear-mounted	6,000 mAh	15 W Fast Charging

=== Galaxy Fx2 (2021) ===
Model	Display	Operating System	Processor	Memory	Storage	Rear Camera	Front Camera	Fingerprint Sensor	Battery	Fast Charging
Galaxy F02s	6.5" HD+ PLS IPS Infinity-V Display (720 x 1600 pixels)	Android 10; One UI 2	Qualcomm Snapdragon 450	3 GB 4 GB	32 GB 64 GB	13 MP (Wide) 2 MP (Macro) 2 MP (Depth)	5 MP	No	5,000 mAh	15 W Fast Charging
Galaxy F12	6.5" HD+ 90 Hz PLS IPS Infinity-V Display (720 x 1600 pixels)	Android 11; One UI 3.1	Samsung Exynos 850	4 GB	64 GB 128 GB	48 MP (Wide) 5 MP (Ultrawide) 2 MP (Depth) 2 MP (Macro)	8 MP	Side-mounted	6,000 mAh	15 W Fast Charging
Galaxy F22	6.4" HD+ 90 Hz Super AMOLED Infinity-U Display (720 x 1600 pixels)	Android 11; One UI Core 3.1	MediaTek Helio G80	4 GB 6 GB	64 GB 128 GB	48 MP (Wide) 5 MP (Ultrawide) 2 MP (Depth) 2 MP (Macro)	13 MP	Side-mounted	6,000 mAh	15 W Fast Charging
Galaxy F42 5G	6.6" FHD+ 90 Hz TFT LCD Infinity-V Display (1080 x 2408 pixels)	Android 11, One UI Core 3.1	MediaTek Dimensity 700	6 GB 8 GB	128 GB	64 MP (Wide) 5 MP (Ultrawide) 2 MP (Depth)	8 MP	Side-mounted	5,000 mAh	15 W Fast Charging
Galaxy F52 5G	6.6" FHD+ 120 Hz TFT LCD Infinity-O Display (1080 x 2408 pixels)	Android 11, One UI 3.1	Qualcomm Snapdragon 750G	8 GB	128 GB	64 MP (Wide) 8 MP (Ultrawide) 2 MP (Macro) 2 MP (Depth)	16 MP	Side-mounted	4,500 mAh	25 W Fast Charging
Galaxy F62	6.7" FHD+ Super AMOLED Plus Infinity-O Display (1080 x 2400 pixels)	Android 11, One UI 3.1	Samsung Exynos 9825	6 GB 8 GB	128 GB	64 MP (Wide) 12 MP (Ultrawide) 5 MP (Macro) 5 MP (Depth)	32 MP	Side-mounted	7,000 mAh	25 W Fast Charging

=== Galaxy Fx3 (2022) ===
Model	Display	Operating System	Processor	Memory	Storage	Rear Camera	Front Camera	Fingerprint Sensor	Battery	Fast Charging
Galaxy F13	6.6" FHD+ PLS IPS Infinity-V Display (1080 x 2408 pixels)	Android 12; One UI Core 4.1	Samsung Exynos 850	4 GB	64 GB 128 GB	50 MP (wide) 5 MP (ultrawide) 2 MP (macro)	8 MP (wide)	Side-mounted	6,000 mAh	15 W Fast Charging
Galaxy F23 5G	6.6" FHD+ 120 Hz TFT LCD Infinity-O Display (1080 x 2408 pixels)	Android 12; One UI 4.1	Qualcomm Snapdragon 750G	4 GB 6 GB	128 GB	50 MP (wide) 8 MP (ultrawide) 2 MP (macro)	8 MP (wide)	Side-mounted	5,000 mAh	25 W Fast Charging

=== Galaxy Fx4 (2023) ===
Model	Display	Operating System	Processor	Memory	Storage	Rear Camera	Front Camera	Fingerprint Sensor	Battery	Fast Charging
Galaxy F04	6.5" HD+ PLS LCD Infinity-V Display (720 x 1600 pixels)	Android 12; One UI 4	MediaTek Helio P35	4 GB	64 GB	13 MP (wide) 2 MP (depth)	5 MP	No	5,000 mAh	15 W Fast Charging
Galaxy F14 5G	6.6" FHD+ 90 Hz PLS LCD Infinity-V Display (1080 x 2408 pixels)	Android 13; One UI Core 5.1	Samsung Exynos 1330	4 GB 6 GB	128 GB	50 MP (wide) 2 MP (macro)	13 MP	Side-mounted	6,000 mAh	25 W Fast Charging
Galaxy F34 5G	6.5" FHD+ 120 Hz Super AMOLED Infinity-U Display (1080 x 2340 pixels)	Android 13; One UI 5.1	Samsung Exynos 1280	6 GB 8 GB	128 GB	50 MP (wide) 8 MP (ultrawide) 2 MP (macro)	13 MP	Side-mounted	6,000 mAh	25 W Fast Charging
Galaxy F54 5G	6.7" FHD+ 120 Hz Super AMOLED+ Infinity-O Display (1080 x 2400 pixels)	Android 13; One UI 5.1	Samsung Exynos 1380	8 GB	256 GB	108 MP (wide) 8 MP (ultrawide) 2 MP (macro)	32 MP	Side-mounted	6,000 mAh	25 W Fast Charging

=== Galaxy Fx5 (2024) ===
Model	Display	Operating System	Processor	Memory	Storage	Rear Camera	Front Camera	Fingerprint Sensor	Battery	Fast Charging
Galaxy F05	6.7" HD+ PLS LCD (720 x 1600 pixels)	Android 14; One UI Core 6.0	Mediatek Helio G85	4GB	64GB	50 MP (wide) 2 MP (macro)	8 MP	No	5000 mAh	25W Fast Charging
Galaxy F14	6.7" FHD+ 90 Hz PLS LCD (1080 x 2400 pixels)	Android 13; One UI Core 5.1	Qualcomm Snapdragon 680 4G	4GB	64GB	50 MP (wide) 2 MP (macro) 2 MP (depth)	13 MP	Side-mounted	5000 mAh	25W Fast Charging
Galaxy F15 5G	6.45" FHD+ 90 Hz Super AMOLED Display (1080 x 2340 pixels)	Android 14; One UI 6.1	Mediatek Dimensity 6100 Plus	4 GB 6 GB	128 GB	50 MP (wide) 5 MP (ultrawide) 2 MP (macro)	13 MP	Side-mounted	6,000 mAh	25 W Fast Charging
Galaxy F55 5G	6.7" FHD+ 120 Hz Super AMOLED+ Display (1080 x 2400 pixels)	Android 14; One UI 6.1	Qualcomm Snapdragon 7 Gen 1	8 GB 12 GB	128 GB 256 GB	50 MP (wide) 8 MP (ultrawide) 2 MP (macro)	50 MP	In-display	5,000 mAh	45 W Fast Charging

=== Galaxy Fx6 (2025) ===
Model	Display	Operating System	Processor	Memory	Storage	Rear Camera	Front Camera	Fingerprint Sensor	Battery	Fast Charging
Galaxy F06 5G	6.7" HD+ PLS LCD (720 x 1600 pixels)	Android 15; One UI Core 7.0	Mediatek Dimensity 6300	4GB; 6GB	128GB	50 MP (wide) 2 MP (macro)	8 MP	Side-mounted	5000 mAh	25W Fast Charging
Galaxy F16	6.7" FHD+ 90 Hz Super AMOLED Display (1080 x 2340 pixels)	Android 15; One UI 7.0	Mediatek Dimensity 6300 (6 nm)	4GB; 6GB; 8GB	128GB	50 MP (wide); 5 MP (ultrawide); 2 MP (macro)	13 MP	Side-mounted	5000 mAh	25W Fast Charging
Galaxy F36	6.7" FHD+ 120 Hz Super AMOLED Display (1080 x 2340 pixels)	Android 15; One UI 7	Samsung Exynos 1380 (5nm)	6GB; 8GB	128GB; 256GB	50 MP (wide); 8 MP (ultrawide); 2 MP (macro)	13 MP	Side-mounted	5000 mAh	25W Fast Charging
Galaxy F56	6.74" FHD+ 120 Hz Super AMOLED+ Display (1080 x 2340 pixels)	Android 15; One UI 7.0	Samsung Exynos 1480 (4nm)	8GB	128GB; 256GB	50 MP (wide); 8 MP (ultrawide); 2 MP (macro)	12 MP	In-display (Optical)	5000 mAh	45W Fast Charging

=== Galaxy Fx7 (2026) ===
Model	Display	Operating System	Processor	Memory	Storage	Rear Camera	Front Camera	Fingerprint Sensor	Battery	Fast Charging
Galaxy F17	6.7" FHD+ 90 Hz Super AMOLED Display (1080 x 2340 pixels)	Android 15; One UI 7	Samsung Exynos 1330 (5 nm)	4GB; 6GB	128GB	50 MP (wide); 5 MP (ultrawide); 2 MP (macro)	13 MP	Side-mounted	5000 mAh	25W Fast Charging
Galaxy F70e	6.7" HD+ 120 Hz PLS LCD (720 x 1600 pixels)	Android 16; One UI 8	Mediatek Dimensity 6300 (6 nm)	4GB; 6GB	128GB	50 MP (wide) auxiliary lens	8 MP	Side-mounted	6000 mAh	25W Fast Charging

== See also ==
- Samsung Galaxy M series
- Samsung Galaxy A series
- Samsung Galaxy Alpha (2014), reportedly originally planned to be titled "Galaxy F"
- Samsung Galaxy
