= Samsung Galaxy A16 =

2024 Android-based smartphones manufactured by Samsung Electronics

Samsung Galaxy A16 Samsung Galaxy A16 5G
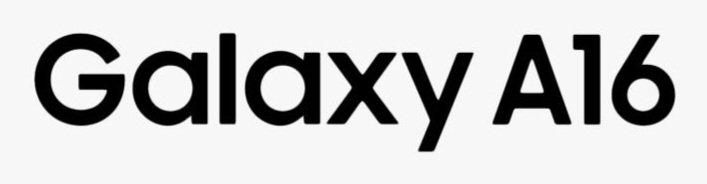

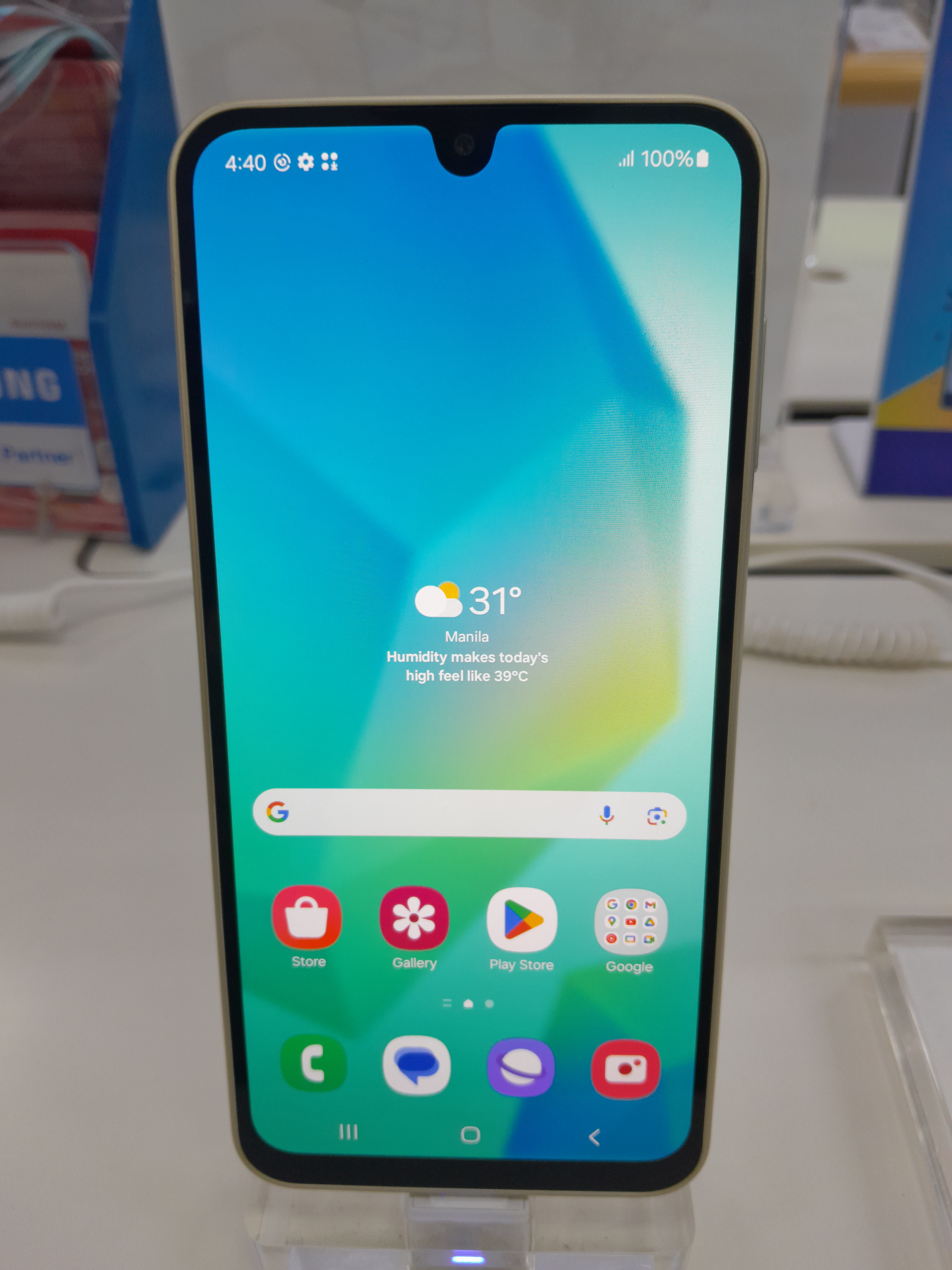
- Also sold as: Galaxy M16 5G; Galaxy F16 5G; Galaxy Buddy 4 (South Korea); Galaxy Wide 8 (South Korea)
- Brand: Samsung
- Manufacturer: Samsung Electronics
- Type: Smartphone
- Series: Galaxy A
- Family: Samsung Galaxy
- First released: October 7, 2024; 2 years ago
- Predecessor: Samsung Galaxy A15
- Successor: Samsung Galaxy A17
- Related: Samsung Galaxy A06; Samsung Galaxy A26 5G; Samsung Galaxy A36 5G; Samsung Galaxy A56 5G
- Compatible networks: A16: 2G / 3G / 4G LTE; A16 5G/M16/F16: 2G / 3G / 4G LTE / 5G NR
- Form factor: Slate
- Dimensions: 164.4 mm (6.47 in) H 77.9 mm (3.07 in) W 7.9 mm (0.31 in) D
- Weight: 200 g (7.1 oz)
- Operating system: Galaxy A16 (LTE & 5G): Original: Android 14 with One UI 6.1; Galaxy M16/F16 5G: Original: Android 15 with One UI 7.0 Current (for A16 LTE/ A16 5G/M16): Android 17 with One UI 9.0 (for F16): Android 16 with One UI 8.5
- System-on-chip: A16: Mediatek Helio G99 (6nm); A16 5G/M16/F16: Exynos 1330 (5 nm), Mediatek Dimensity 6300 (6 nm)
- CPU: Octa-core (2x2.4 GHz Cortex-A78 & 6x2.0 GHz Cortex-A55) or Octa-core (2x2.4 GHz Cortex-A76 & 6x2.0 GHz Cortex-A55)
- GPU: Mali-G68 MP2, Mali-G57 MC2
- Memory: 4, 6 or 8 GB
- Storage: 128, 256 GB
- SIM: Nano-SIM
- Battery: 5000 mAh
- Charging: 25 W Super Fast Charging (Charger not included in box)
- Rear camera: Triple-Camera Setup; Primary: Samsung ISOCELL S5KJN1; 50 MP, f/1.8, 26mm, FoV 78.7°, 1/2.76", 0.64μm, AF; Ultrawide: SmartSens SC501; 5 MP, f/2.2, 17mm, FoV 104.3°, 1/5.0", 1.12μm Macro: GalaxyCore GC02M1; 2 MP, f/2.4, 1/5.0", 1.75μm Camera features: LED flash, Panorama, HDR; Video recording: 1080p@30fps, gyro-EIS
- Front camera: GalaxyCore GC13A0; 13 MP, f/2.0, 27mm (wide), FoV 78.1°, 1/3.1", 1.12μm Video recording: 1080p@30fps
- Display: 6.7 in (170 mm); 1080 x 2340 px resolution, 19.5:9 ratio (~396 ppi density); Super AMOLED, 90Hz, 800 nits (HBM)
- Sound: Mono speaker
- Connectivity: Wi-Fi 802.11 a/b/g/n/ac, dual-band, Wi-Fi Direct; Bluetooth 5.3, A2DP, LE
- Data inputs: Multi-touch screen USB Type-C 2.0; Fingerprint scanner Accelerometer; Gyroscope; Compass
- Water resistance: IP54
- Development status: Released

The Samsung Galaxy A16 and Galaxy A16 5G are Android mid-range smartphones developed and marketed by Samsung Electronics in 2024. The 5G model was first announced on October 7, 2024, which was followed by the LTE model on October 17, 2024. It is the first A1x series device to receive six OS upgrades in a span of six years. The phone is part of the Galaxy A series.

There were also rebranded versions of the device: the Galaxy M16 5G (announced on February 27, 2025), the Galaxy F16 5G (announced on March 12, 2025), Galaxy Buddy 4 (announced on May 9, 2025), and the Galaxy Wide 8 (announced on June 18, 2025), with the latter two devices exclusively sold for South Korea.

== Specifications ==
=== Design ===
Like its predecessor, the Galaxy A15, it inherited the same plastic back (albeit with different design: the LTE model having a matte back, while the 5G models having a glossy back), plastic frame and the glass front.

Galaxy A16 LTE	Galaxy A16 5G Galaxy Buddy 4	Galaxy M16 5G Galaxy Wide 8	Galaxy F16 5G
Gray; Light Green; Black	Gold; Light Gray; Light Green; Blue Black	Light Orange; Mint Green; Thunder Black	Vibing Blue; Glam Green; Bling Black

=== Hardware ===
==== Display ====
All models continue to feature superAMOLED display with 90 Hz refresh rate, with the only upgrade being a larger 6.7-inch display (up from the 6.5-inch from the Galaxy A15).

==== Battery ====
All models also continue to use 5000 mAh battery and still supports 25 W fast charging, just like its predecessor.

==== Performance ====
The system-on-chip on the LTE model uses the MediaTek Helio G99 system-on-chip as with the previous model, while the 5G models sport either a MediaTek Dimensity 6300 or Samsung's own Exynos 1330 system-on-chip depending on the region.

RAM and storage options continue to be the same as its predecessor: 128 GB or 256 GB (UFS 2.2) of storage and 4 GB, 6 GB, 8 GB of RAM. It also continues to have a microSDXC SD card slot.

==== Camera ====
All models continue to have a camera setup exactly the same with its predecessor: 50MP wide, 5MP ultrawide, 2MP macro, and 13MP front camera.

Camera		Resolution	Aperture	Video recording resolution
Rear	Wide (main)	50 MP	f/1.8	1080p@30fps
Rear	Ultra-wide	5 MP	f/2.2	1080p@30fps
Rear	Macro	2 MP	f/2.4	—
Front camera		13 MP	f/2.0	1080p@30fps

=== Software ===
The A16 (both LTE and 5G models) came with Android 14 and One UI 6.1 pre-installed, while the M16 and F16 came with Android 15 and One UI 7 pre-installed. These are the first devices in the A1x/M1x/F1x series and overall in the Galaxy A/M/F series that will receive six OS upgrades and six years of security updates, lasting until October 2030.

	Pre-installed OS	OS Upgrades history						End of support
	Pre-installed OS	1st	2nd	3rd	4th	5th	6th	End of support
A16 LTE	Android 14 (One UI 6.1)	Android 15 (One UI 7.0); May 2025	Android 16 (One UI 8.0); October 2025 (One UI 8.5); May/June 2026	Android 17 (One UI 9.0); October 2026				October 2030
A16 5G; Galaxy Buddy 4	Android 14 (One UI 6.1)	Android 15 (One UI 7.0); May 2025	Android 16 (One UI 8.0); October 2025 (One UI 8.5); May/June 2026	Android 17 (One UI 9.0); October 2026				October 2030
M16 5G; Galaxy Wide 8	Android 15 (One UI 7.0)	Android 16 (One UI 8.0); October 2025 (One UI 8.5); June 2026	Android 17 (One UI 9.0); October 2026					October 2030
F16 5G	Android 15 (One UI 7.0)	Android 16 (One UI 8.0); October 2025 (One UI 8.5); June 2026						October 2030

== Reception ==
=== Sales ===
According to Counterpoint Research, the Samsung Galaxy A16 5G was the world's best selling Android smartphone in Q1 2025. Counterpoint says it saw a 17% increase in sales over the Galaxy A15 5G from the year before.

Preceded by Samsung Galaxy A15	Samsung Galaxy A16 / A16 5G; 2024	Succeeded by Samsung Galaxy A17
