= Android 15 =

2024 Android mobile operating system

- Version of the Android operating system

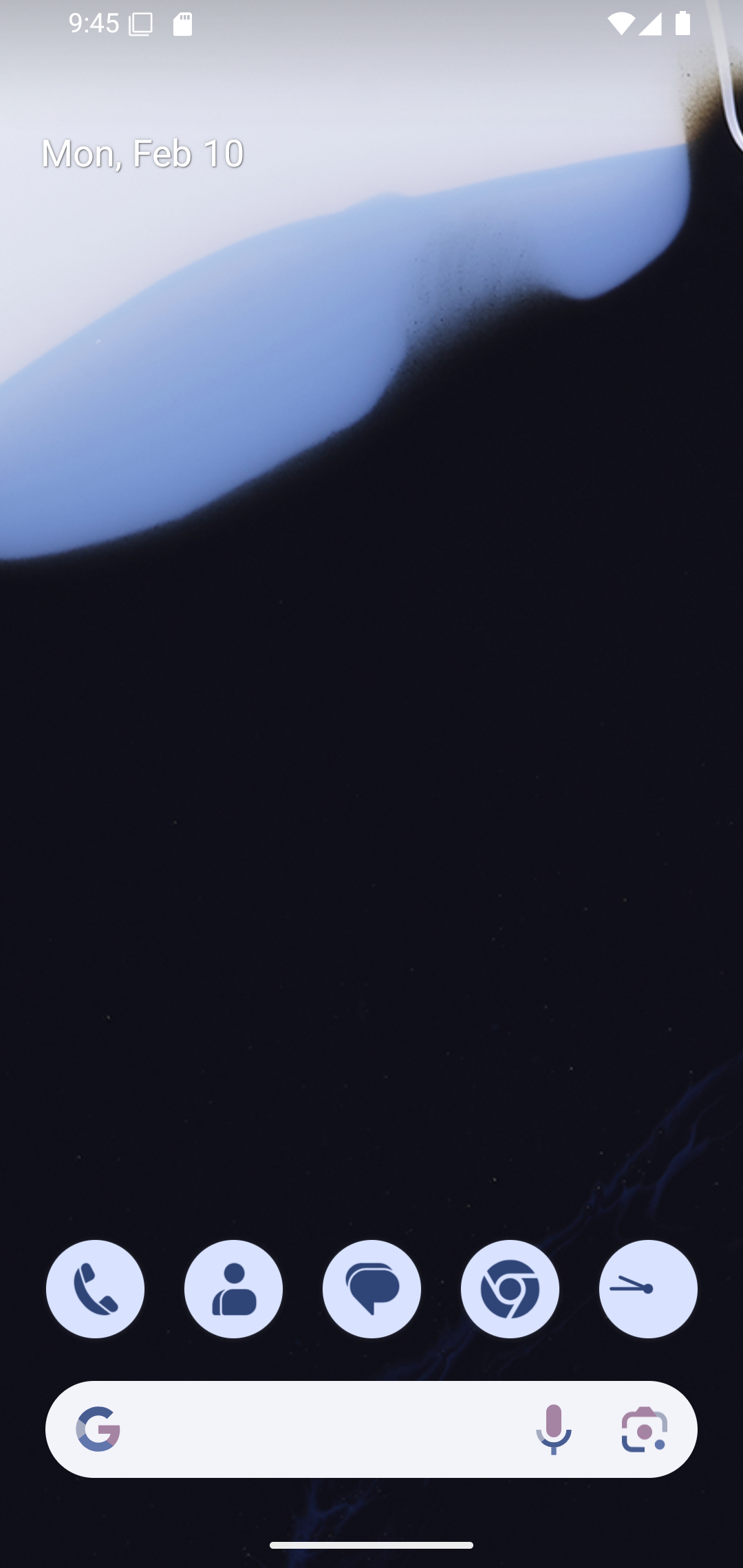
- Android 15 screenshot with Pixel Launcher 15
- Developer: Google
- OS family: Android
- Source model: Open-source software
- Released to manufacturing: September 3, 2024; 2 years ago
- General availability: October 15, 2024; 2 years ago
- Latest release: 15.0.0_r19 (ASV1.240715.057) / November 2, 2026; 10 days ago
- Kernel type: Monolithic (Linux)
- Preceded by: Android 14
- Succeeded by: Android 16
- Official website: developer.android.com/about/versions/15/release-notes

Support status
- Supported

Android 15 is the fifteenth major release and the 22nd version of Android, the mobile operating system developed by the Open Handset Alliance and led by Google. The first developer preview was released on February 16, 2024, the first beta was released on April 11, 2024, and the final source code was released on September 3, 2024. Android 15 was released for Google Pixel devices on October 15, 2024.

As of July 2026, 17.19% of Android devices run Android 15, making it the 2nd most used version of Android.

== History ==
Android 15's Developer Preview logo

Android 15 is internally codenamed "Vanilla Ice Cream". The first developer preview (also known as DP1) for Android 15 was released on February 16, 2024, while the second developer preview (DP2) was released on March 21, 2024.

The first beta of Android 15 was released on April 11, 2024. It contained updates such as displaying apps as edge-to-edge by default, and app archiving. The second beta launched on May 15, 2024, and came with features such as private space, improved widget previews, and improved picture-in-picture. The third beta of Android 15 was released on June 18, 2024. It launched a slightly redesigned passkey and credentials manager. The fourth and final beta of Android 15 was launched on July 18, 2024. The updates included predictive back animations and app screen sharing (allowing users to share or record 1 app instead of their entire screen).

Android 15 was officially launched for Google Pixel devices on October 15, 2024.

== Features ==
The official DP1 release notes state that the following features will be introduced in Android 15:

- Privacy Sandbox
- Health Connect
- File integrity
- Partial screen sharing
- In-app camera controls
- Dynamic Performance
- Sensitive notifications
- Notification cooldown

However, enthusiasts have discovered the existence of other under development features that may be released in later developer preview versions, such as the reintroduction of lockscreen widgets, which were introduced in Android 4.2 but later removed in Android 5.0. Other such features include battery health determination, app archiving, voice activation, private space and app pairs and an improved multi-tasking and windowing in desktop mode.

The release of DP2 brought improved compatibility with satellite networks, improvements to the built-in PDF reader and support for app archiving.

The release of DP2.1 brought apps the ability to scale edge-to-edge and draw translucent system bars at the top and bottom of the screen, OS-level support for app archiving and unarchiving on third-party app stores, better braille support, end-to-end encryption for contact keys, and new developer features.

Other improvements included a redesigned authentication panel, improved privacy and security settings, a new volume panel, Predictive Back, and Bluetooth audio fixes.

Alongside platform stability, the Stable Version added a redesigned credentials manager and the deprecation of WebSQL.

Android 15 adds support for the ISO 21496-1 gain map HDR image format standard, backward-compatible with SDR displays. It is encoded or decoded simultaneously with the Ultra HDR standard. This format is also supported by Apple starting with iOS 18, allowing for true cross-platform HDR image compatibility between Android and iOS devices.

Android 15 is based on Linux kernel version 6.6,. However, some devices still run earlier versions underneath (including versions 5.15 and 6.1 on most Google Pixel devices).

== See also ==
- Android version history
