= XXXII Corps =

32nd Corps, Thirty-second Corps, or XXXII Corps may refer to:

== United Kingdom ==
- 32nd Kent (Eltham) Rifle Volunteer Corps
- 32nd (Liverpool) Lancashire Rifle Volunteer Corps
- 32nd Yorkshire West Riding Rifle Volunteer Corps

== Other countries ==
- XXXII Army Corps (Wehrmacht), Germany
- 32nd Army Corps (Russian Empire)
- 32nd Rifle Corps, Soviet Union
- 32nd Army Corps (Ukraine)

== See also ==
- List of military corps by number
- 32nd Army (disambiguation)
- 32nd Battalion (disambiguation)
- 32nd Brigade (disambiguation)
- 32nd Division (disambiguation)
- 32nd Regiment (disambiguation)
- 32nd Squadron (disambiguation)
- 32nd (disambiguation)
