= 32nd Cavalry =

32nd Cavalry may refer to:

== Divisions ==
- 32nd Cavalry Division (Soviet Union)

== Regiments and battalions ==
- 32nd Cavalry (Pakistan)
- 32nd Cavalry Regiment (United States)
- 32nd Lancers, British India

=== American Civil War units ===
- 32nd Virginia Cavalry Battalion, Confederate States Army
- 32nd Texas Cavalry Regiment, Confederate States Army

== Companies ==
- 32nd (Lancashire) Company, Imperial Yeomanry

== See also ==
- 32nd Division (disambiguation)
- 32nd Brigade (disambiguation)
- 32nd Regiment (disambiguation)
- 32nd (disambiguation)
