= 32nd =

32nd is the ordinal form of the number 32. 32nd or Thirty-second may also refer to:

- A fraction, 1/32, equal to one of 32 equal parts
- Thirty-second note, in music

== Geography ==
- 32nd meridian east, a line of longitude
- 32nd meridian west, a line of longitude
- 32nd parallel north, a circle of latitude
- 32nd parallel south, a circle of latitude
- 32nd Street (disambiguation)

== Military ==
- 32nd Army (disambiguation)
- 32nd Battalion (disambiguation)
- 32nd Brigade (disambiguation)
- 32nd Division (disambiguation)
- 32nd Regiment (disambiguation)
- 32nd Squadron (disambiguation)

== Other ==
- 32nd century
- 32nd century BC

== See also ==
- 32 (disambiguation)
- 30 Seconds (disambiguation)
