= 32nd Army =

32nd Army may refer to:

- Thirty-Second Army (Japan), Imperial Japanese Army
- 32nd Army (Soviet Union)

== See also ==
- List of armies by number
- XXXII Corps (disambiguation)
- 32nd Division (disambiguation)
- 32nd Brigade (disambiguation)
- 32nd Regiment (disambiguation)
- 32nd Battalion (disambiguation)
- 32nd Squadron (disambiguation)
- 32nd (disambiguation)
