= 32 =

32 may refer to:

- 32 (number), the natural number following 31 and preceding 33
- One of the years 32 BC, AD 32, 1932, 2032

== Science ==
- Germanium, a metalloid in the periodic table
- 32 Pomona, an asteroid in the asteroid belt

== Music ==
- The shortened pseudonym of UK rapper Wretch 32
- ThirtyTwo (album), a 2014 album by Reverend and The Makers

=== Songs ===
- "32" (song), a 2013 single from the Carpark North album Phoenix
- "32", a song on Mr. Mister's debut album I Wear the Face
- "Thirty Two", a 1967 song by Van Morrison from New York Sessions '67
- "The Chamber of 32 Doors", a 1974 song by Genesis from The Lamb Lies Down on Broadway
- "Thirty Two", a song by Karma to Burn from the album Wild, Wonderful Purgatory, 1999

== Other uses ==
- .32 caliber, a family of firearm cartridges
  - .32 ACP, a handgun cartridge
- Highway 32
- ThirtyTwo, snowboarding brand owned by Sole Technology
- 0032 (custom car), a Chip Foose custom car
- The international calling code for Belgium

== See also ==
- Germanium (Ge) element 32
- 32nd (disambiguation)
- Type 032 (disambiguation)
- Channel 32 (disambiguation)
- Route 32 (disambiguation)
- List of highways numbered 32
- U+0032, Unicode codepoint 32
