= List of highways numbered 33 =

The following highways are numbered 33:

== International ==
- Asian Highway 33
- European route E33

== Australia ==
- South Arm Highway (Tasmania)

== Canada ==
- Alberta Highway 33
- British Columbia Highway 33
- Bedford Bypass, also known as Nova Scotia Trunk 33
- Ontario Highway 33
- Saskatchewan Highway 33

== Czech Republic ==
- I/33 Highway; Czech: Silnice I/33

== Greece ==
- EO33 road

== Iceland ==
- Route 33 (Iceland)

== India ==
- National Highway 33 (India)
- UP-SH-33(Mathura - Bareilly) (India)

== Iran ==
- Road 33

== Ireland ==
- N33 road (Ireland)

== Italy ==
- Autostrada A33

== Japan ==
- Japan National Route 33

== Korea, South ==
- National Route 33

== Malaysia ==
- Duta–Ulu Klang Expressway
- FT 33 SPA Highway

== New Zealand ==
- New Zealand State Highway 33

== Poland ==
- National road 33 (DK33)

== Turkey ==
- Otoyol 33

== United Kingdom ==
- British A33 (Southampton-Reading)

== United States ==
- U.S. Route 33
- Alabama State Route 33
- Arkansas Highway 33
  - Arkansas Highway 33C
- California State Route 33
  - County Route J33 (California)
  - County Route S33 (California)
- Connecticut Route 33
- Florida State Road 33
  - County Road 33 (Lake County, Florida)
- Georgia State Route 33
- Hawaii Route 33 (former)
- Idaho State Highway 33
- Illinois Route 33
- Indiana State Road 33 (former)
  - County Road 33 (Elkhart County, Indiana)
- K-33 (Kansas highway)
- Kentucky Route 33
- Louisiana Highway 33
  - Louisiana State Route 33 (former)
- Maryland Route 33
- Massachusetts Route 33
- M-33 (Michigan highway)
- Minnesota State Highway 33
  - County Road 33 (Ramsey County, Minnesota)
  - County Road 33 (Sherburne County, Minnesota)
- Mississippi Highway 33
- Missouri Route 33
- Nebraska Highway 33
- Nevada State Route 33 (former)
- New Hampshire Route 33
- New Jersey Route 33
  - County Route 33 (Bergen County, New Jersey)
    - County Route S33 (Bergen County, New Jersey)
  - County Route 33 (Monmouth County, New Jersey)
- New York State Route 33
  - County Route 33 (Broome County, New York)
  - County Route 33 (Cattaraugus County, New York)
  - County Route 33 (Chautauqua County, New York)
  - County Route 33 (Dutchess County, New York)
  - County Route 33 (Erie County, New York)
  - County Route 33 (Lewis County, New York)
  - County Route 33 (Onondaga County, New York)
  - County Route 33 (Ontario County, New York)
  - County Route 33 (Orange County, New York)
  - County Route 33 (Oswego County, New York)
  - County Route 33 (Otsego County, New York)
  - County Route 33 (Putnam County, New York)
  - County Route 33 (Rockland County, New York)
  - County Route 33 (Saratoga County, New York)
  - County Route 33 (Schenectady County, New York)
  - County Route 33 (Schoharie County, New York)
  - County Route 33 (Suffolk County, New York)
  - County Route 33 (Sullivan County, New York)
  - County Route 33 (Tioga County, New York)
  - County Route 33 (Ulster County, New York)
  - County Route 33 (Yates County, New York)
- North Carolina Highway 33
- North Dakota Highway 33 (former)
- Ohio State Route 33 (former)
- Oklahoma State Highway 33
- Pennsylvania Route 33
- Rhode Island Route 33
- South Carolina Highway 33
- Tennessee State Route 33
- Texas State Highway 33
  - Texas State Highway Spur 33
  - Ranch to Market Road 33
  - Texas Park Road 33
- Utah State Route 33 (former)
- Virginia State Route 33
  - Virginia State Route 33 (1923–1933) (former)
  - Virginia State Route 33 (1933-1938) (former)
- West Virginia Route 33
- Wisconsin Highway 33
- Wyoming Highway 33

- Guam Highway 33
- Puerto Rico Highway 33
- U.S. Virgin Islands Highway 33

== See also ==
- A33 (disambiguation)#Roads
- List of highways numbered 33A
- List of highways numbered 33B

Preceded by 32	Lists of highways 33	Succeeded by 34
