= List of highways numbered 32 =

The following highways are numbered 32:

== International ==
- AH32 Asian Highway 32
- E32 European route E32

== Australia ==
- Great Western Highway
- Barrier Highway
- East Derwent Highway
- Mitchell Highway

== Canada ==
- Alberta Highway 32
- Manitoba Highway 32
- Northwest Arm Drive, also known as Nova Scotia Trunk 32
- Ontario Highway 32 (former)
- Saskatchewan Highway 32

== Costa Rica ==
- National Route 32

== Cuba ==
- Highway 4–32

== Czech Republic ==
- I/32 Highway (Czech Republic); Czech: Silnice I/32

== Hungary ==
- Main road 32 (Hungary)

== Iceland ==
- Route 32 (Iceland)

== India ==
- National Highway 32 (India)

== Iran ==
- Road 32

== Ireland ==
- N32 road (Ireland) (former)

== Italy ==
- Autostrada A32

== Japan ==
- Japan National Route 32
- Kōchi Expressway
- Tokushima Expressway

== Korea, South ==
- Asan–Cheongju Expressway
- National Route 32
- Gukjido 32

== Malaysia ==
- West Coast Expressway
- FT 32 Malaysia Federal Route 32

== New Zealand ==
- New Zealand State Highway 32

== Poland ==
- National road 32 (Poland)

== Thailand ==
- Highway 32 (Thailand)

== Turkey ==
- O-32, a motorway in Turkey running from İzmir to Çeşme, İzmir Province.

== United Kingdom ==
- British A32 (Alton-Gosport)
- British M32 (Hambrook-Bristol)

== United States ==
- U.S. Route 32 (former)
- New England Route 32 (former)
- Alabama State Route 32
- Arkansas Highway 32
- California State Route 32
  - County Route J32 (California)
  - County Route S32 (California)
- Connecticut Route 32
- Delaware Route 32 (former)
- Florida State Road 32
  - County Road 32 (Levy County, Florida)
- Georgia State Route 32
- Hawaii Route 32
- Idaho State Highway 32
- Illinois Route 32
- Indiana State Road 32
- Iowa Highway 32
- K-32 (Kansas highway)
- Kentucky Route 32
- Louisiana Highway 32 (former)
- Maine State Route 32
- Maryland Route 32
  - Maryland Route 32AA
  - Maryland Route 32AH
  - Maryland Route 32B
- Massachusetts Route 32
- M-32 (Michigan highway)
- Minnesota State Highway 32
  - County Road 32 (Anoka County, Minnesota)
  - County Road 32 (Dakota County, Minnesota)
  - County Road 32 (Hennepin County, Minnesota)
  - County Road 32 (Ramsey County, Minnesota)
  - County Road 32 (St. Louis County, Minnesota)
- Mississippi Highway 32
- Missouri Route 32
- Nebraska Highway 32
- Nevada State Route 32 (former)
- New Hampshire Route 32
- New Jersey Route 32
  - County Route 32 (Bergen County, New Jersey)
    - County Route S32 (Bergen County, New Jersey)
  - County Route 32 (Monmouth County, New Jersey)
  - County Route 32 (Ocean County, New Jersey)
- New Mexico State Road 32
- New York State Route 32
- North Carolina Highway 32
- North Dakota Highway 32
- Ohio State Route 32
- Oklahoma State Highway 32
- Oregon Route 32 (former)
- Pennsylvania Route 32
- South Carolina Highway 32 (former)
- South Dakota Highway 32
- Tennessee State Route 32
- Texas State Highway 32 (proposed)
  - Texas State Highway Spur 32 (former)
  - Ranch to Market Road 32
  - Texas Park Road 32
- Utah State Route 32
- Virginia State Route 32
  - Virginia State Route 32 (1923-1933) (former)
  - Virginia State Route 32 (1933-1940) (former)
- West Virginia Route 32
- Wisconsin Highway 32
- Wyoming Highway 32

Territories

- Guam Highway 32
- Puerto Rico Highway 32
- U.S. Virgin Islands Highway 32

== See also ==
- A32 (disambiguation)#Roads
- List of highways numbered 32A
- List of highways numbered 32B

Preceded by 31	Lists of highways 32	Succeeded by 33
