= Type 032 =

Type 032 may refer to:

- Type 032 midget submarine (People's Republic of China) a 1950s sub of the People's Liberation Army Navy (PLAN)
- Type 032 submarine (People's Republic of China), aka Qing class; a 2010s sub of the People's Liberation Army Navy (PLAN)

== See also ==
- 32 (disambiguation)
