= Channel 32 =

Channel 32 refers to several television stations:

- Canal 32, a French regional television channel

== Canada ==
The following television stations operate on virtual channel 32 in Canada:

- CICO-DT-32 in Windsor, Ontario
- CIVK-DT-1 in Gascons, Quebec
- CIVT-DT in Vancouver, British Columbia
- CKCS-DT in Calgary, Alberta

== Mexico ==
The following television station operates on virtual channel 32 in Mexico:

- XHJCI-TDT in Ciudad Juárez, Chihuahua

== See also ==
- Channel 32 virtual TV stations in the United States

For UHF frequencies covering 579.25-583.75 MHz

- Channel 32 TV stations in Canada
- Channel 32 TV stations in Mexico
- Channel 32 digital TV stations in the United States
- Channel 32 low-power TV stations in the United States
