= List of highways numbered 33B =

The following highways are numbered 33B:

== United States ==
- Nevada State Route 33B (former)
- New York State Route 33B, three former roads

== See also ==
- List of highways numbered 33
