= A33 =

A33, A 33 or A-33 may refer to:

== Roads ==
- A33 road (England), connecting Reading and Southampton
- A33 motorway (France), connecting Nancy and Dombasle-sur-Meurthe
- A 33 motorway (Germany), connecting the A 30 in the north and the A 44 in the south
- A33 motorway (Italy), under construction, connecting Asti and Cuneo
- A33 motorway (Spain), proposed, in Murcia connecting Cieza and Font de la Figuera
- A33 road (Sri Lanka), connecting Ja Ela-Ekala-Gampaha-Yakkala
- A33 road (Botswana), in Botswana

== Other uses ==
- Douglas A-33, a 1941 American fighter aircraft
- A33 Excelsior, a British tank prototype
- HLA-A33, a human serotype
- Samsung Galaxy A33 5G, an Android smartphone
- English Opening in chess (Encyclopaedia of Chess Openings code A33, among others)
