= Samsung Galaxy A13 =

2021 budget smartphone by Samsung Electronics

Samsung Galaxy A13 Samsung Galaxy A13 5G
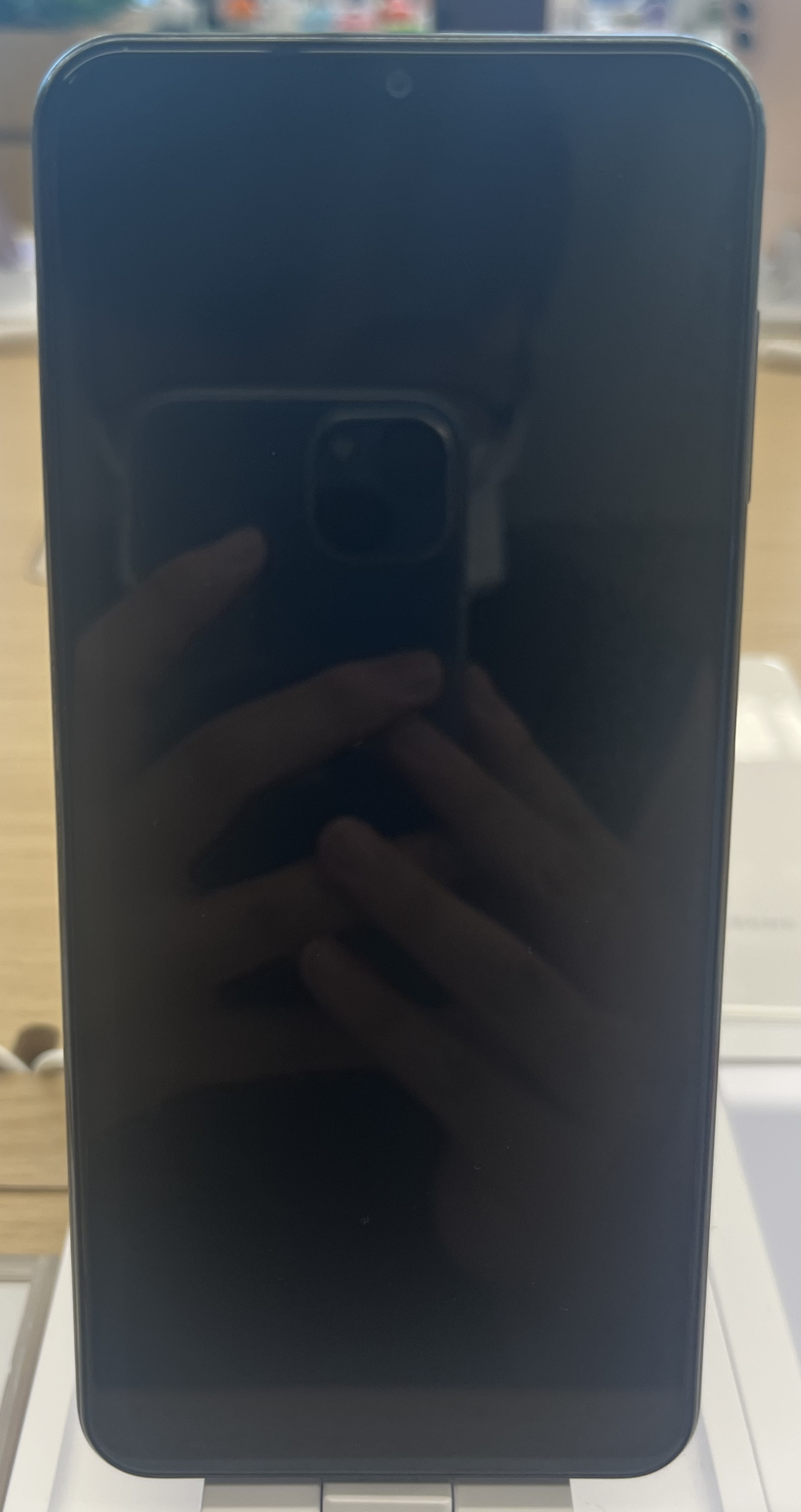
- Front of the Samsung Galaxy A13
- Also known as: 5G: Galaxy Wide6 (in South Korea)
- Brand: Samsung
- Manufacturer: Samsung Electronics
- Type: Smartphone
- Series: Galaxy A
- Family: Samsung Galaxy
- First released: LTE: March 4, 2022; 4 years ago 5G: December 3, 2021; 4 years ago
- Predecessor: Samsung Galaxy A12
- Successor: Samsung Galaxy A14
- Related: Samsung Galaxy A23; Samsung Galaxy A33 5G; Samsung Galaxy A53 5G; Samsung Galaxy A73 5G; Samsung Galaxy M13
- Compatible networks: LTE: 2G, 3G, 4G LTE; 5G: 2G, 3G, 4G LTE, 5G
- Form factor: Slate
- Colors: 4G: Black, Blue, Pink, White; 5G: Black, Green, Pink, Blue, Orange
- Dimensions: LTE: 165.1 mm (6.50 in) H 76.5 mm (3.01 in) W 8.8 mm (0.35 in) D 5G: 164.5 mm (6.48 in) H 76.5 mm (3.01 in) W 8.8 mm (0.35 in) D
- Weight: 195 g (6.9 oz)
- Operating system: A13 5G: Original: Android 11 with One UI 3.1; Current: Android 13 with One UI 5.1; A13 4G: Original: Android 12 with One UI 4.1; Current: Android 14 with One UI 6.1
- System-on-chip: LTE: SM-A135x: Samsung Exynos 850 (8 nm); SM-A137: MediaTek MT6769V/CU Helio G80 (12 nm); 5G: MediaTek MT6833 Dimensity 700 5G (7 nm)
- CPU: LTE: SM-A135x: Octa-core (4x2.0 GHz Cortex-A55 & 4x2.0 GHz Cortex-A55); SM-A137: Octa-core (2x2.0 GHz Cortex-A75 & 6x1.8 GHz Cortex-A55); 5G: Octa-core (2x2.2 GHz Cortex-A76 & 6x2.0 GHz Cortex-A55)
- GPU: LTE: Mali-G52 MC2; 5G: Mali-G57 MC2
- Memory: LTE: 3 GB, 4 GB, 6 GB RAM; 5G: 4 GB RAM, 6 GB RAM
- Storage: LTE: 32 GB, 64 GB, 128 GB; 5G: 64 GB, 128 GB
- Removable storage: microSD
- SIM: Nano-SIM
- Battery: 5000 mAh
- Charging: 15W Fast Charging
- Rear camera: Quad-Camera Setup; LTE: Primary: Samsung ISOCELL S5KJN1; 50 MP, f/1.8, 27mm, FoV 78.5°, 1/2.76", 0.64µm, PDAF; Ultrawide: GalaxyCore GC5035; 5 MP, f/2.2, 13mm, FoV 115.9°, 1/5.0", 1.12µm, FF; Macro: GalaxyCore GC02M1; 2 MP, f/2.4, 1/5.0", 1.75µm, FF; Depth: GalaxyCore GC02M1B; 2 MP, f/2.4, 1/5.0", 1.75µm; Triple-Camera Setup; 5G: Primary: Samsung ISOCELL S5KJN1; 50 MP, f/1.8, 27mm, FoV 78.5°, 1/2.76", 0.64µm, PDAF; Macro: GalaxyCore GC02M1; 2 MP, f/2.4, 26mm, 1/5.0", 1.75µm, FF; Depth: GalaxyCore GC02M1B; 2 MP, f/2.4, 1/5.0", 1.75µm; Camera features: LED flash, Panorama, HDR; Video recording: 1080p@30fps
- Front camera: LTE: GalaxyCore GC08A3; 8 MP, f/2.2, 25mm (wide), FoV 81.1°, 1/4.0", 1.12µm, FF; 5G: GalaxyCore GC5035F; 5 MP, f/2.0, 25mm (wide), 1/5.0", 1.12µm, FF; Video recording: 1080p@30fps
- Display: LTE: 6.6 in (170 mm), FHD+ PLS IPS; V-Cut Display (1080 x 2408 pixels); 5G: 6.5 in (170 mm), HD+ 90 Hz PLS IPS; Infinity-V Display (720 x 1600 pixels)
- Sound: Loudspeaker; 3.5mm jack Dolby Atmos
- Connectivity: Wi-Fi 802.11 a/b/g/n/ac, dual-band, Wi-Fi Direct, hotspot Bluetooth 5.0, A2DP, LE; A-GPS, GLONASS, GALILEO, BDS
- Data inputs: Multi-touch screen; USB Type-C 2.0; Fingerprint scanner (side-mounted); Accelerometer; Gyroscope; Compass; Barometer
- Water resistance: None
- Model: 4G: SM-A135F, SM-A135F/DS, SM-A135M, SM-A135U, SM-A135U1, SM-A137F, SM-A137F/DSN, SM-A137F/DS; 5G: SM-A136U, SM-A136U1, SM-A136W, SM-A136B, SM-S136DL
- SAR: 1.27 W/kg (head); 0.58 W/kg (body)
- Website: Samsung Galaxy A13 5G

The Samsung Galaxy A13 and Samsung Galaxy A13 5G are budget Android-based smartphones manufactured and designed by Samsung Electronics. The 4G LTE model was announced on March 4, 2022, while the 5G model was first announced on December 1, 2021, in the US and on August 23, 2022, around the world, making them successors to the Galaxy A12. It is also the first A1x series to have a 5G version of the device. A refreshed variant of the LTE version was made available in July 2022.

== Specifications ==
=== Design ===
The screen of the Galaxy A13 is made of Corning Gorilla Glass 5 in both 4G and 5G models. The body of the 4G model is made of glossy plastic, while the 5G model is made of matte plastic.

At the bottom are the USB-C connector, speaker, microphone and 3.5 mm audio jack. The Galaxy A13 5G has a second microphone on top. On the left side, depending on the version, there is a slot for 1 SIM card and a microSD memory card up to 1 TB or for 2 SIM cards and a microSD memory card up to 1 TB or only for 1 SIM card and microSD memory card up to 1 TB in Galaxy A13 5G. On the right side are the volume buttons and the lock button, which has a built-in fingerprint scanner.

Galaxy A13 LTE	Galaxy A13 5G
Black; White; Blue; Peach

=== Hardware ===
==== Display ====
The screen in the LTE variant has a PLS TFT LCD, 6.6" FullHD+ (2408 × 1080) with a pixel density of 400 ppi, an aspect ratio of 20:9 and an Infinity-V (drop-shaped) cutout for the front camera.

The 5G variant's screen has a PLS TFT LCD, 6.5", HD+ (1600 × 720), with a pixel density of 270 ppi, an aspect ratio of 20:9, a display refresh rate of 90 Hz, and an Infinity-V (drop-shaped) cutout for the front camera.

==== Battery ====
All models have a 5000 mAh battery and support for fast charging at 15 W.

==== Processor and memory ====
The LTE model has an Exynos 850 processor and a Mali-G52 graphics processor. Later, the refreshed variant (bearing the model number SM-A137F) uses the Mediatek Helio G80 processor. The 5G model has a MediaTek Dimensity 700 processor with 5G support and a Mali-G57 MC2 graphics processor.

The LTE variants have RAM options ranging from 3 to 6 GB, while storage options range from 32 to 128 GB (all variants use eMMC 5.1). The 5G variants have RAM options ranging from 4 to 6 GB, while storage options range from 64 to 128 GB (all variants also use eMMC 5.1).

==== Camera ====
The LTE variant has a quad camera setup consisting of 50 MP wide-angle, 5 MP ultra-wide-angle, 2 MP macro, 2 MP depth sensor. Main camera uses four-way pixel binning and true resolution is 12.5 MP. The front camera has a resolution of 8 MP and an aperture of f/2.2 (wide). The main and front cameras are capable of recording videos in 1080p@30fps resolution.

The 5G variant has a triple camera setup consisting of 50 MP wide-angle, 2 MP macro, 2 MP depth sensor. The front camera has a resolution of 5 MP and an aperture of f/2.0 (wide-angle). The main and front cameras are capable of recording videos in 1080p@30fps resolution.

==== Connectivity ====
The 4G model supports data up to 4G/LTE. The 5G model supports 5G as well. Unlike its predecessor, both the 4G and 5G models support NFC. They also support Bluetooth.

=== Software ===
The LTE variants and the Global version of the 5G variant have Android 12 and One UI 4.1 pre-installed, while the US and Canada 5G variants of the device have Android 11 and One UI 3.1 pre-installed. Like its predecessor, it is only slated to receive 2 OS upgrades and 4 years of security updates.

	Pre-installed OS	OS Upgrades history		End of support
	Pre-installed OS	1st	2nd	End of support
A13 LTE	Android 12 (One UI 4.1)	Android 13 (One UI 5.0); December 2022	Android 14 (One UI 6.0); January 2023	May 2026
A13 LTE (SM-A137F)	Android 12 (One UI 4.1)	Android 13 (One UI 5.0); December 2022	Android 14 (One UI 6.0); January 2023	May 2026
A13 5G; US/Canada variant	Android 11 (One UI 3.1)	Android 12 (One UI 4.0); June 2022	Android 13 (One UI 5.0); December 2022	May 2026
A13 5G; Global variant	Android 12 (One UI 4.1)	Android 13 (One UI 5.0); December 2022	Android 14 (One UI 6.0); December 2023	May 2026

== Reception ==
The Verge noted that the device was a good budget option and stated that it had good battery life and performance but a weaker screen and camera.

Preceded by Samsung Galaxy A12	Samsung Galaxy A13 / A13 5G; 2021 / 2022	Succeeded by Samsung Galaxy A14
