= Samsung Galaxy A73 5G =

2022 Android smartphone by Samsung

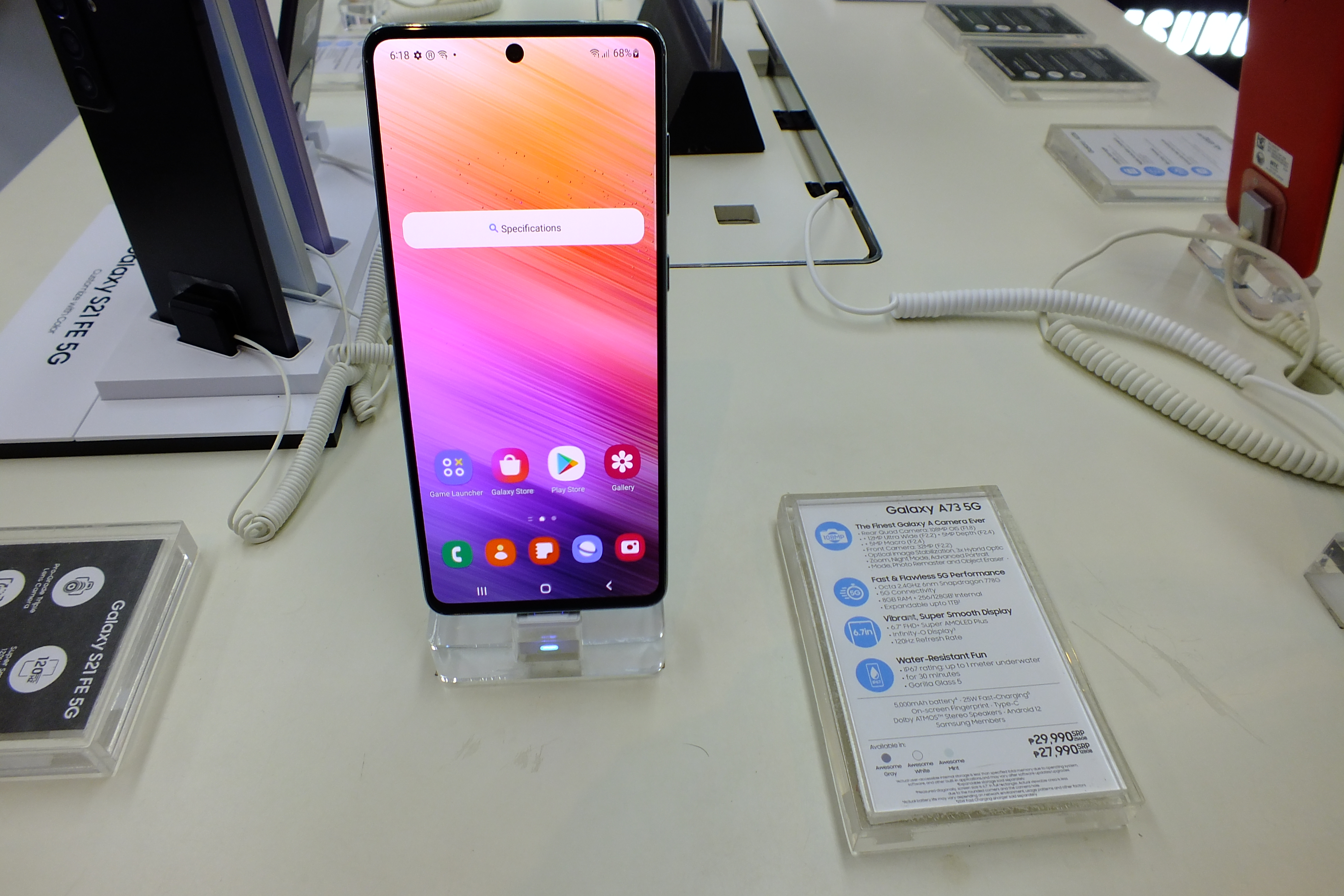
- Front of the Samsung Galaxy A73 5G
- Brand: Samsung
- Manufacturer: Samsung Electronics
- Type: Smartphone
- Series: Galaxy A series
- First released: March 17, 2022; 4 years ago
- Predecessor: Samsung Galaxy A72; Samsung Galaxy A52s 5G
- Successor: Samsung Galaxy A54; Samsung Galaxy M54; Samsung Galaxy S23 FE
- Related: Samsung Galaxy A13; Samsung Galaxy A23; Samsung Galaxy A33 5G; Samsung Galaxy A53 5G
- Compatible networks: GSM / HSPA / LTE / LTE-A / 5G NR
- Form factor: Slate
- Dimensions: 163.7 mm (6.44 in) H 76.1 mm (3.00 in) W 7.6 mm (0.30 in) D
- Weight: 181 g (6.4 oz)
- Operating system: Original: Android 12 with One UI 4.1; Current: Android 16 with One UI 8; Up to 4 major Android version updates
- System-on-chip: Snapdragon 778G 5G (6 nm)
- CPU: Octa-core (4x2.4 GHz Kryo 670 & 4x1.8 GHz Kryo 670)
- GPU: Adreno 642L
- Modem: Snapdragon® X53 5G Modem-RF System
- Memory: 6 GB, 8 GB RAM
- Storage: 128 GB, 256 GB
- Removable storage: microSDXC (up to 1 TB)
- SIM: Single SIM (Nano-SIM) or Hybrid Dual SIM (Nano-SIM, dual stand-by)
- Battery: 5000 mAh
- Charging: 25W Fast Charging
- Rear camera: Quad-Camera Setup; Primary: Samsung ISOCELL S5K(HM6); 108 MP, f/1.8, 23mm, FoV 86.4°, 1/1.67", 0.64μm, PDAF, OIS; Ultrawide: Sony IMX 258; 12 MP, f/2.2, 13mm, FoV 116.3°, 1/3.06", 1.12µm, FF; Macro: GalaxyCore GC5035; 5 MP, f/2.4, 23mm, 1/5.0", 1.12µm, FF; Depth: GalaxyCore GC5035; 5 MP, f/2.4, 1/5.0", 1.12µm; Camera features: LED flash, panorama, HDR; Video recording: 4K@30fps, 1080p@30/60fps, 720p@30fps; gyro-EIS
- Front camera: Sony IMX 616; 32 MP, f/2.2, 26mm (wide), FoV 78.9°, 1/2.74", 0.8µm, FF; Camera features: HDR; Video recording: 4K@30fps, 1080p@30/60fps, 720p@30fps
- Display: 6.7 in (170 mm); Infinity-O display 1080 x 2400 pixels, 20:9 aspect ratio (~393 ppi density); Super AMOLED+, 120Hz refresh rate 108.4 cm2 (~87.0% screen-to-body ratio)
- Sound: Stereo speakers
- Connectivity: Wi-Fi 802.11 a/b/g/n/ac/6, dual-band, Wi-Fi Direct, hotspot Bluetooth 5.0, A2DP, LE; A-GPS, GLONASS, GALILEO, BDS
- Data inputs: Multi-touch screen USB Type-C 2.0; Sensors: Fingerprint scanner (under display, optical); Accelerometer; Gyroscope; Proximity sensor; Compass
- Water resistance: IP67 dust/water resistant (up to 1 Meter for 30 minutes)
- Model: SM-A736B

The Samsung Galaxy A73 5G is a mid-range Android smartphone in Samsung's Galaxy A series. It was announced on March 17, 2022, alongside the Galaxy A33 5G and A53 5G. It was also the last Galaxy A7x device to be launched under the lineup, and was succeeded by the Galaxy A5x lineup.

== Specifications ==
=== Design ===
The screen is Corning Gorilla Glass 5, while the back panel and sides are frosted plastic. It is resistant to water and powder with IP67 certification.

Galaxy A73 5G
- Awesome Gray
- Awesome White
- Awesome Mint

=== Hardware ===
The Galaxy A73 5G is a smartphone with a slate-type factor form, which is 159.6 mm × 74.8 mm × 8.1 mm in size and weighs 189 grams.

The device is equipped with GSM, HSPA, LTE and 5G connectivity, Wi-Fi 802.A/b/g/n/ac/ax dual-band with Wi-Fi Direct and hotspot support. It also has Bluetooth 5 with A2DP and LE, GPS with BeiDou, Galileo, GLONASS and QZSS and NFC. It has a USB-C 2.0 port but no 3.5 mm audio jack input.

==== Display ====
It has a 6.7-inch diagonal touchscreen, Super AMOLED+ Infinity-O, rounded corners and FHD+ resolution of 1080 × 2400 pixels. The screen supports a 120 Hz refresh rate. For screen protection, it uses Gorilla Glass 5.

==== Battery ====
The Samsung Galaxy A73 5G has a 5000 mAh lithium polymer battery with support for 25W fast charging technology.

==== Processor and memory ====
The chipset is a Qualcomm Snapdragon 778G with an octa-core CPU (4 cores at 2.4 GHz + 4 cores at 1.8 GHz), and the Adreno 642L GPU. Internal storage options include 128/256 GB with expandable storage with microSD up to 1 TB, while the RAM is 6 or 8 GB.

==== Camera ====
The rear camera has a 108 MP main sensor with an f/1.8 opening, equipped with a PDAF, OIS, HDR mode and a flash LED mode, capable of recording up to 4K at 30 frames per second or 1080p at 60 frames per second. It is accompanied by a 12 MP f/2.2 ultrawide camera, 5 MP f/2.4 macro camera and a 5 MP f/2.4 depth camera. The front camera is a single 32 MP camera, capable of recording 1080p at 30fps and 4K at 30fps.

=== Software ===
The device comes with the Android 12 operating system pre-installed with One UI 4.1, which is the latest version of Android available at the time of its release. The A33, A53 and A73 alongside a selection of other Samsung Galaxy devices, were set to receive 4 Android OS upgrades and 5 years of security updates.

	Pre-installed OS	OS Upgrades history				End of support
	Pre-installed OS	1st	2nd	3rd	4th	End of support
A73 5G	Android 12 (One UI 4.1)	Android 13 (One UI 5.0); November 2022 (One UI 5.1); February 2023	Android 14 (One UI 6.0); November 2023 (One UI 6.1); June 2024	Android 15 (One UI 7.0); May 2025	Android 16 (One UI 8.0); October 2025	Expected within 2027
