= Samsung Galaxy A23 =

2022 Android smartphone manufactured by Samsung

Samsung Galaxy A23 Samsung Galaxy A23 5G

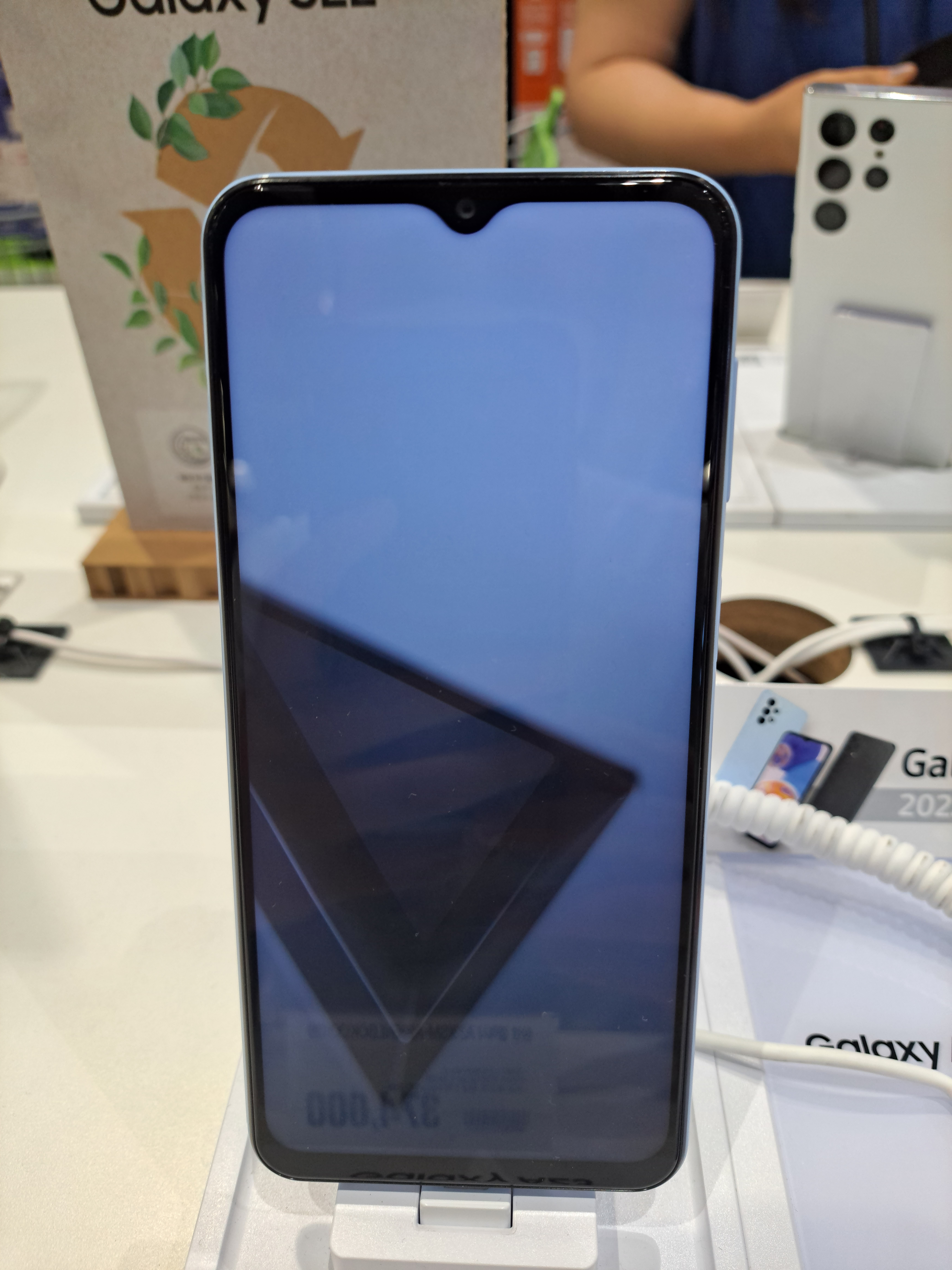
- Samsung Galaxy A23 on display in South Korea
- Brand: Samsung Galaxy
- Manufacturer: Samsung Electronics
- Type: Phone
- Series: Galaxy A series
- First released: A23: March 4, 2022; 4 years ago A23 5G: August 5, 2022; 4 years ago
- Discontinued: April 19, 2023; 3 years ago
- Predecessor: Samsung Galaxy A22; Samsung Galaxy A22 5G
- Successor: Samsung Galaxy A24
- Related: Samsung Galaxy A13; Samsung Galaxy A33 5G; Samsung Galaxy A53 5G; Samsung Galaxy A73 5G
- Compatible networks: GSM / HSPA / LTE
- Form factor: Slate
- Colors: Black, White, Peach, Blue
- Dimensions: 165.4 mm (6.51 in) H 76.9 mm (3.03 in) W 8.4 mm (0.33 in) D
- Weight: A23: 195 g (6.9 oz); A23 5G: 197 g (6.9 oz)
- Operating system: Original: Android 12 with One UI 4.1; Current: Android 14 with One UI 6.1
- System-on-chip: A23: Qualcomm Snapdragon 680 4G (6 nm); A23 5G: Qualcomm Snapdragon 695 5G (6 nm)
- CPU: A23: Octa-core (4x2.4 GHz Kryo 265 Gold & 4x1.9 GHz Kryo 265 Silver); A23 5G: Octa-core (2x2.2 GHz Kryo 660 Gold & 6x1.7 GHz Kryo 660 Silver)
- GPU: A23: Adreno 610; A23 5G: Adreno 619
- Memory: 4 GB, 6 GB, 8 GB RAM
- Storage: 64 GB, 128 GB, eMMC 5.1
- Removable storage: microsdxc
- SIM: Single SIM (Nano-SIM) or Dual SIM (Nano-SIM, dual stand-by)
- Battery: 5000 mAh
- Charging: Fast Charging 15W and Super Fast Charging 25W
- Rear camera: Quad-Camera Setup; All: Primary: Samsung ISOCELL (S5K)JN1; 50 MP, f/1.8, 26mm, FoV 78.4°, 1/2.76", 0.64 µm, PDAF, OIS; Ultrawide: GalaxyCore GC5035; 5 MP, f/2.2, 13mm, FoV 116.4°, 1/5.0", 1.12 µm, FF; Macro: GalaxyCore GC02M1; 2 MP, f/2.4, 26mm, 1/5.0", 1.75 µm, FF; Depth: GalaxyCore GC02M1B; 2 MP, f/2.4, 1/5.0", 1.75 µm; Camera features: LED flash, Panorama, HDR; Video recording: 1080p@30fps, 720p@30fps
- Front camera: A23: GalaxyCore GC08A3; 8 MP, f/2.2, 25mm (wide), FoV 81.1°, 1/4.0", 1.12 µm, FF; A23 5G: GalaxyCore GC08A3; 8 MP, f/2.0, 25mm (wide), FoV 81.1°, 1/4.0", 1.12 µm, FF - USA or GalaxyCore GC08A3; 8 MP, f/2.2, 25mm (wide), FoV 81.1°, 1/4.0", 1.12 µm, FF - International; Video recording: All: 1080p@30fps, 720p@30fps
- Display: 6.6 in (170 mm), 104.9 cm2 (~83.0% screen-to-body ratio); 1080 x 2408 pixels, 20:9 ratio (~400 ppi density); Corning Gorilla Glass 5
- Sound: 3.5mm jack
- Connectivity: Wi-Fi 802.11 a/b/g/n/ac, dual-band, Wi-Fi Direct, hotspot Bluetooth 5.0, A2DP, LE; A-GPS, GLONASS, GALILEO, BDS
- Data inputs: Multi-touch screen USB Type-C 2.0
- Model: SM-A235x (4G); SM-A236x (5G) (last letter varies by carrier and international models)
- Codename: "a23" for 4G "a23xq" for 5G

The Samsung Galaxy A23 is an Android-based smartphone designed, developed and marketed by Samsung Electronics as a part of its Galaxy A series. The phone was announced on March 4, 2022, alongside the Galaxy A13.

== Specifications ==
=== Design ===
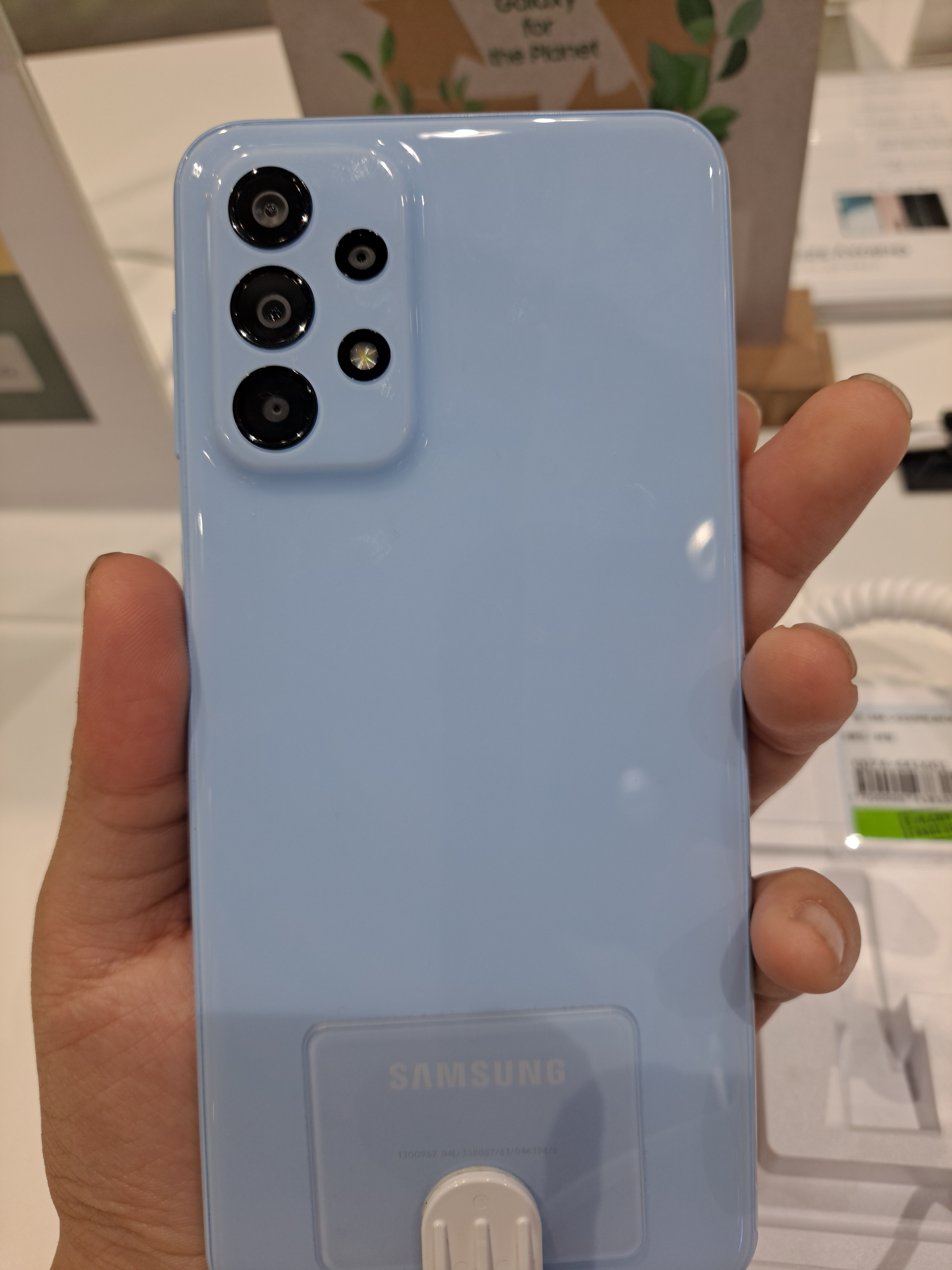
Back of the Samsung Galaxy A23 (LTE)

The screen features Corning Gorilla Glass 5 protection, while the back panel and sides are made of plastic. Both models share a plastic back design but differ in finish: the LTE model sports a glossy finish, whereas the 5G model features a matte finish.

The smartphone's design closely resembles the Galaxy A33 5G.

Below are the USB-C connector, speaker, microphone and 3.5 mm audio jack. The second microphone is located on top. Depending on the version, there is a slot for 1 SIM card and a microSD memory card up to 1 TB or a slot for 2 SIM cards and a microSD memory card up to 1 TB. On the right are the volume buttons and the smartphone lock button, which has a built-in fingerprint scanner.

| Galaxy A23 LTE | Galaxy A23 5G |
|---|---|
Black; White; Blue; Peach

=== Hardware ===
Galaxy A23 is a smartphone with a slate-type factor form, the size of which is 164.5 × 76.9 × 8.4 mm and weighs 195 grams.

The device is equipped with GSM, HSPA and LTE connectivity and Wi-Fi 802.A/b/g/n/ac dual-band with Bluetooth 5.0 Wi-Fi Direct support and hotspot support with A2DP and LE, GPS with A-GPS, BeiDou, Galileo and GLONASS. It has a USB-C port 2.0 and 3.5 mm audio jack input.

==== Display ====
Both variants have a 6.6 inch diagonal touchscreen, TFT LCD Infinity-V-type, rounded corners and 1080 × 2408 pixel FHD+ resolution. The key difference between the devices is their refresh rate: the LTE variant features 90Hz, while the 5G variant offers 120Hz.

==== Battery ====
Both variants have a 5000 mAh non-removable battery and supports fast charging at 25 W.

==== Processor and memory ====
The LTE variant uses the Qualcomm Snapdragon 680, while the 5G variant uses the Qualcomm Snapdragon 695 chipsets. The internal storage options are available in 64/128 GB (eMMC for the LTE version, UFS 2.2 for the 5G version, with the latter being a first in the A2x series) expandable with microSD up to 1 TB, while RAM ranges from 4 to 8 GB.

==== Camera ====
The back camera has a quad camera layout: a 50 megapixel main sensor, 8MP ultrawide camera, a 2MP Macro camera and a 2 MP depth sensor. The main camera is equipped with a phase detect auto focus, HDR mode and flash LED mode, capable of recording up to 1080p to 30 frames per second, while the front camera is single 8MP.

=== Software ===
The phone was shipped with Android 12 and One UI 4.1. Unlike its A3x and A5x counterparts, it is only slated to receive 2 OS upgrades and 4 years of security updates. It also marks the last time these devices under the Galaxy A2x series will receive this limited support, as its successor would have an extended software support.

| | Pre-installed OS | OS Upgrades history | | End of support |
| | Pre-installed OS | 1st | 2nd | End of support |
|---|---|---|---|---|
| A23 LTE | Android 12 (One UI 4.1) | Android 13 (One UI 5.0); December 2022 | Android 14 (One UI 6.0); January 2024 | May 2026 |
| A23 5G | Android 12 (One UI 4.1) | Android 13 (One UI 5.0); December 2022 | Android 14 (One UI 6.0); December 2023 | October 2026 |
