= Samsung Galaxy A53 5G =

2022 Android smartphone by Samsung

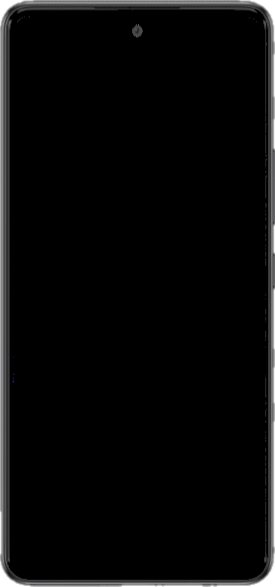
- Front of the Samsung Galaxy A53 5G
- Brand: Samsung
- Manufacturer: Samsung Electronics
- Type: Smartphone
- Series: Galaxy A series
- First released: March 17, 2022; 4 years ago
- Predecessor: Samsung Galaxy A52
- Successor: Samsung Galaxy A54 5G
- Related: Samsung Galaxy A13; Samsung Galaxy A23; Samsung Galaxy A33 5G; Samsung Galaxy A73 5G; Samsung Galaxy A54
- Compatible networks: GSM / HSPA / LTE / 5G NR
- Form factor: Slate
- Colors: Awesome Black, Awesome White, Awesome Blue, Awesome Peach
- Dimensions: 159.6 mm (6.28 in) H 74.8 mm (2.94 in) W 8.1 mm (0.32 in) D
- Weight: 189 g (6.7 oz)
- Operating system: Original: Android 12 with One UI 4.1; Current: Android 16 with One UI 8
- System-on-chip: Exynos 1280 (5 nm)
- CPU: Octa-core (2x2.4 GHz Cortex-A78 & 6x2.0 GHz Cortex-A55)
- GPU: Mali-G68
- Memory: 6 GB, 8 GB RAM
- Storage: 128 GB, 256 GB
- SIM: Nano-SIM
- Battery: 5000 mAh
- Charging: 25W Super Fast Charging
- Rear camera: Quad-Camera Setup; Primary: Sony IMX 682; 64 MP, f/1.8, 24mm, FoV 83.1°, 1/1.73", 0.8 µm, PDAF, OIS; Ultrawide: Sony IMX 258; 12 MP, f/2.2, 13mm, FoV 116.3°, 1/3.06", 1.12 µm, FF; Macro: GalaxyCore GC5035; 5 MP, f/2.4, 25mm, 1/5.0", 1.12 µm, FF; Depth: GalaxyCore GC5035; 5 MP, f/2.4, 1/5.0", 1.12 µm; Camera features: LED flash, Panorama, HDR; Video recording: 4K@30fps, 1080p@30/60fps, 720p@30fps; gyro-EIS
- Front camera: Sony IMX 616; 32 MP, f/2.2, 25mm (wide), FoV 82.5°, 1/2.76", 0.8 µm, FF; Camera features: HDR; Video recording: 4K@30fps, 1080p@30/60fps, 720p@30fps
- Display: 6.5 in (170 mm); Infinity-O display, Super AMOLED, 120Hz refresh rate, 800 nits 1080 x 2400 px resolution, 20:9 aspect ratio (~405 ppi density); Corning Gorilla Glass 5
- External display: Always on
- Sound: Stereo speakers
- Connectivity: Wi-Fi 802.11 a/b/g/n/ac/ax - A536N Model only, dual-band, Wi-Fi Direct, hotspot Bluetooth 5.1, A2DP, LE; A-GPS, GLONASS, GALILEO, BDS
- Data inputs: Multi-touch screen; USB Type-C 2.0; Fingerprint scanner (optical under display); Accelerometer; Gyroscope; Compass
- Water resistance: IP67 dust/water resistant (up to 1m for 30 mins)
- Model: International models: SM-A536x (last letter varies by carrier and international models); Japanese models: SCG15 (au); SC-53C (NTT Docomo)
- Codename: Galaxy A
- Website: www.samsung.com/us/smartphones/galaxy-a53-5g/

The Samsung Galaxy A53 5G is a mid-range Android-based smartphone developed and manufactured by Samsung Electronics as a part of its Galaxy A series. The phone was announced on 17 March 2022 at the Samsung Galaxy Unpacked event alongside the Galaxy A33 5G and Galaxy A73 5G.

The A53 runs on Samsung's Exynos 1280 processor and has a quad-camera system featuring a 64 MP main camera with a 32 MP front camera. The Galaxy A53 is the first device in Samsung's A series to receive 4 OS upgrades and 5 years of software updates.

== Specifications ==
=== Design ===
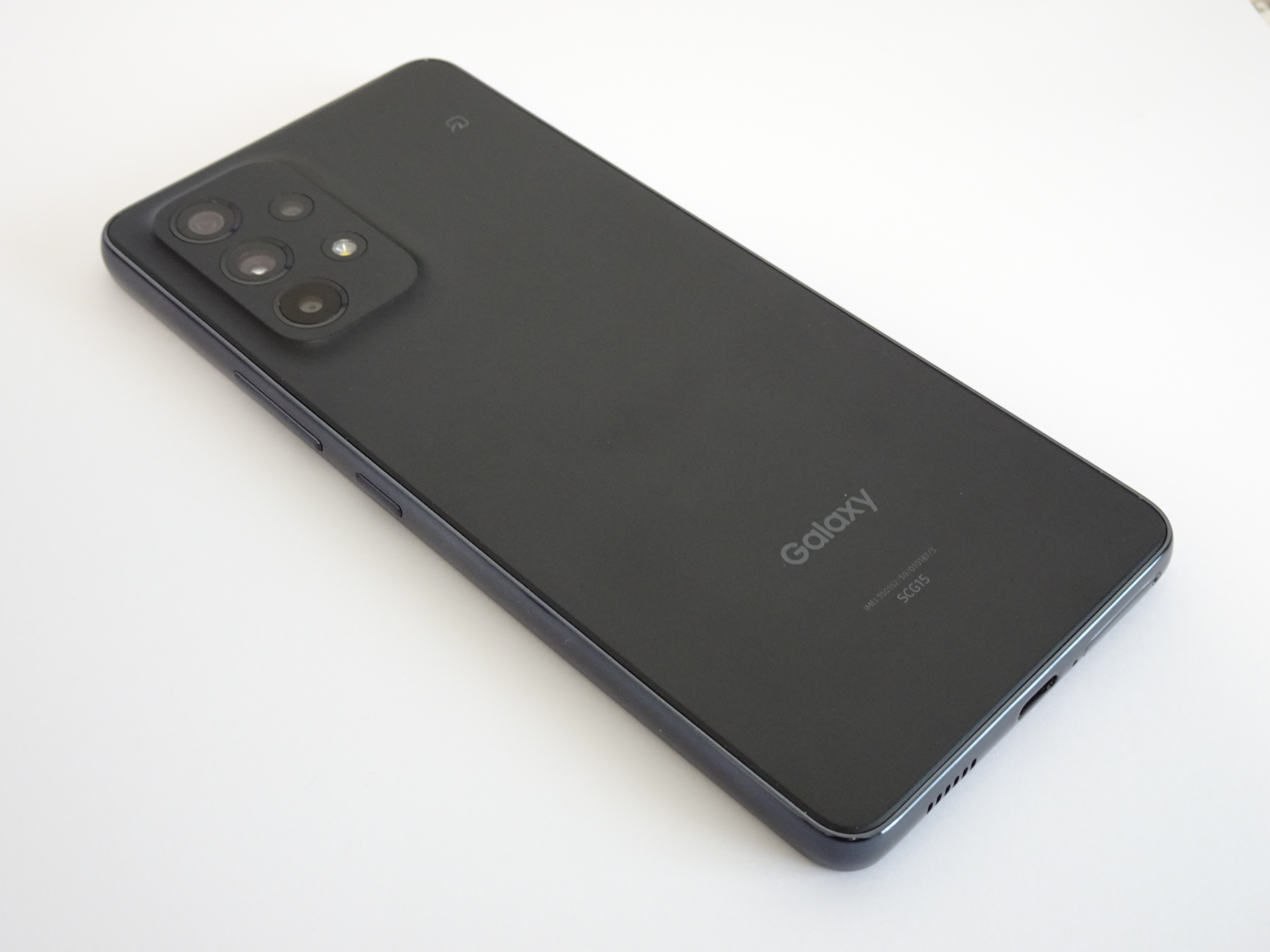
Back of the Samsung Galaxy A53 5G

The display is made of Corning Gorilla Glass 5. The back panel and side are made of frosted plastic. It was also the last A5x device to have a plastic back, as its successor began to use a glass back.

The design of the Galaxy A53 looks almost similar to its predecessor, but the rear panel is now completely flat, and the transition between the rear panel and the camera unit is smoother.

Below is a USB-C connector, speaker, and microphone. Depending on the version, the phone has either a slot for 1 SIM card and microSD memory card up to 1 TB or a hybrid slot for 2 SIM cards. The second microphone is located on top. On the right side are the volume buttons and the smartphone lock button. It is the first A5x device to drop the 3.5mm headset jack. Devices that were released prior to the Galaxy A53 as well as devices positioned below the A5x line continued to have the headset jack.

Galaxy A53 5G
- Awesome Black
- Awesome White
- Awesome Blue
- Awesome Peach

=== Hardware ===
The Galaxy A53 5G is a smartphone with a slate-type factor form, which is 159.6 × 74.8 × 8.1 mm in size and weighs 189 grams (6.7 oz).

The device is equipped with GSM, HSPA, LTE and 5G connectivity, Wi-Fi 802.11 a/b/g/n/ac dual-band with Bluetooth 5.1, Wi-Fi Direct support and hotspot support with A2DP and LE, GPS with BeiDou, Galileo, GLONASS and QZSS and NFC. It has a USB Type-C 2.0 port. It is dust and water-resistant with IP67 certification.

==== Display ====
The device has a 6.5-inch diagonal Super AMOLED display with Infinity-O-type punch-hole camera, rounded corners, FHD+ resolution of 1080×2400 pixels, with an adaptive refresh rate up to 120 Hz protected by Gorilla Glass 5.

==== Battery ====
Similar to its predecessor, it has a 5000mAh non-removable battery, supporting fast charging at 25 W.

==== Processor ====
The device uses the Samsung Exynos 1280 chipset with an octa-core CPU (2 cores at 2.4 GHz + 6 cores at 2 GHz). It has UFS 2.2 internal memory with 128/256 GB storage and microSD expandable up to 1 TB. RAM options are either 6 or 8 GB.

==== Camera ====
The Galaxy A53's rear camera array features four cameras, also similar to its predecessor, consisting of a 64 MP main camera, a 12 MP ultrawide camera, a 5 MP macro camera, and a 5 MP depth camera. The front camera uses the same 32 MP sensor.

=== Software ===
The phone was shipped with Android 12 and One UI 4.1. The device, alongside the A33, A73 and a selection of other Samsung Galaxy devices, were announced to receive four Android OS upgrades and five years of security updates.

	Pre-installed OS	OS Upgrades history				End of support
	Pre-installed OS	1st	2nd	3rd	4th	End of support
A53 5G	Android 12 (One UI 4.1)	Android 13 (One UI 5.0); November 2022 (One UI 5.1); February 2023	Android 14 (One UI 6.0); November 2023 (One UI 6.1); May 2024	Android 15 (One UI 7.0); May 2025	Android 16 (One UI 8.0); October 2025	Expected within 2027
