= Route 32 (disambiguation) =

Route 32 is a list of highways numbered 32.

Route 32 may also refer to:

- Route 32 (WMATA), a bus route in Washington, D.C.
- Route 32 (MBTA), a bus route in Boston
- London Buses route 32
