= 32nd Division (Yugoslav Partisans) =

Yugoslav Partisan military division formed in 1943

32nd Zagorje Division
- Flag of Democratic Federal Yugoslavia (used by the Partisans)
- Active: 1943–1945
- Country: Democratic Federal Yugoslavia
- Branch: Yugoslav Partisan Army
- Type: Infantry
- Size: 1,764 (upon formation)
- Engagements: World War II in Yugoslavia

Commanders
- Notable commanders: Izidor Štrok

The 32nd Zagorje Division (Serbo-Croatian Latin: Tridesetdruga zagorska divizija) was a Yugoslav Partisan division formed on 12 December 1943 on Kalnik mountain. It was formed from Radić Brothers Brigade and Matija Gubec Brigade which had a total of 1,764 fighters. The division was commanded by Izidor Štrok while its political commissar was Ivan Rabić. The division mostly operated in Croatia proper.
