= List of highways numbered 32A =

The following highways are numbered 32A:

== United States ==
- New England Interstate Route 32A (former)
- Hawaii Route 32A
- Massachusetts Route 32A
- Nevada State Route 32A (former)
- New York State Route 32A
  - County Route 32A (Otsego County, New York)
  - County Route 32A (Suffolk County, New York)
