= Type 032 midget submarine =

Class overview
- Builders: Jiangnan Shipyard
- Operators: People's Liberation Army Navy
- Subclasses: 032, 032-1
- Completed: 1
- Retired: 1

General characteristics
- Type: midget submarine
- Displacement: 32 tonnes (31 long tons; 35 short tons)
- Length: 14 m (45 ft 11 in)
- Height: 4 m (13 ft 1 in)
- Installed power: Batteries
- Propulsion: Electric motor
- Speed: 9 knots (17 km/h; 10 mph)

The Type 032 midget submarine and its experimental version Type 032-1 belongs to a family of midget sub developed by the People's Liberation Army Navy (PLAN) in the late 1950s, and it was one of the first submarine indigenously developed in the People's Republic of China (PRC). However, due to the political turmoil in China at the time, Type 032 series was cancelled after only a single unit was completed.

== Development ==
In the era of Great Leap Forward, PLAN decided to indigenously develop a midget sub for coastal defense, and the midget sub was to adopt the newest hull form, the teardrop hull. Unlike the normal development process where approval is given first before work start, the design begun first and approval was asked and given afterward. Naval Engineer department of the People's Liberation Army Engineering Institute (PLAEI), the predecessor of Harbin Engineering University (HEU) was tasked to design the midget sub. The design team consisted of a team of student led by Professor Yu Hong-Sen (俞鸿森), and the design task was used as the student’s graduation project. Members of the design team would later become Chinese nuclear submarine designers, including Mr. Deng San-Rui (邓三瑞) and Mr. Ji Ke-Qin (季克勤). After all design drawing was completed, Mr. Deng San-Rui, Mr. Ji Ke-Qin would accompany Senior general Chen Geng, the dean of PLAEI to Beijing to ask the then Chief of the General Staff Senior General Huang Kecheng permission to develop the midget sub, which was subsequently given.

The project managerial team of Type 032 series midget sub consisted of the leadership of the Shipbuilding and Repair Department (SRD) of the PLAN Headquarter (海军司令部修造部). The project manager was SRD director Senior colonel Lin Zhen (林真), deputy project manager was SRD political commissar Senior colonel Li Deng-Song (李登嵩), acting project managers were Senior colonel Xue Zong-Hua (薛宗华) and Senior colonel Ren Xiu-Sheng (任秀生). Due to the political upheaval in China at the time, namely, the Great Leap Forward, many other projects were also rushed into development, and most members of project managerial team were also assigned other tasks at the same time, and thus had very little time for Type 032 project. As a result, acting project manager Xue Zong-Hua was actually in charge of the project thorough out the entire development of Type 032. After all initial design drawings were completed, further developmental work was supported by the 702nd Research Institute of China Shipbuilding Industry Corporation (CSIC). Contrary to the ordinary practice of building the production version after the prototype was successfully proven, in the heat of political zealousness at the time, it was decided to develop both the prototype and production version in parallel: subsystems of both would start at the same time, since most of them are same, while the construction of the hull of the production version would start before the completion of the prototype, thus overlapping each other. Such haste would eventually lead to the complete failure of the production version and eventual cancellation of the entire program. The prototype was designated as Type 032-1, while the production version entering service was designated as Type 032.

== Type 032-1 ==
Type 032-1 is the unarmed prototype of the Type 032 series, and eventually, it is also the only one completed among the series. Political upheaval has caused numerous problems in that the subsystems could not be ready because many subsystems delivered was in such poor quality that they were rejected immediately upon inspection. Type 032 is powered by lead batteries used by railway cargo carts. Construction was finally completed in November 1958 at Jiangnan Shipyard, but sea trials had to be conducted at Lushunkou. The reason to select Lushunkou as the test site is because water depth averages only 70 meters in Lushunkou, much shallower than that of Shanghai region, so if accident occurs during sea trials, it would be easier to carry out rescue missions. In addition, Lushunkou is also the only base in China at the time where Chinese submarine fleet is stationed, and the commander of the base at the time, Major general Liu Huaqing provided great support to the program. In order to make the trip, Type 032-1 had to be first loaded on a barge at Jiangnan Shipyard to be shipped to the Shanghai railway station in the north via Huangpu River. The midget sub was then loaded on a flatbed railway cart to be transported to Lushunkou. Crew to conduct sea trials also traveled by the same cargo train, with a temporary hut built on one of the flatbed carts of the same train. After three days travel by railway, the midget sub reached its destination and was transferred to a pier at the base, with sea trials immediate followed.

The testing team of Type 032-1 consisted a crew that included seasoned submariners such as Mr. Han Wen-Yun (韩文运), the captain of the boat, Chen Ji-Lin (陈吉林), the crew chief, Mr. Jing Li-Feng (荆聿封), Mr. Li X-Ju (李锡驹), data recording staff on board the boat. The test manager was originally Professor Wang Xu (王旭) of Tianjin University, but after being hospitalized in early April 1959 due to illness, deputy test manager Mr. Chen Hou-Tai (陈厚泰) assumed the responsibility of test management. Three sea trials were conducted, with the first one revealed the sub was a little unstable when going backward, and based on this discovered, the design was modified to incorporate an additional pair of stabilizing fins to resolve the issue. The second sea trial was to evaluate the batteries, which provide enough power to meet the designed speed at 9 kts. However, it was discovered more batteries were needed to provide greater endurance and range. The third sea trial was submergence test, which was successfully completed. However, because the sub performed much better than expected, testing crew remain submerge much longer than originally planned, causing people on the surface and land to mistakenly believe the sub had sunk due to lack of adequate communication means at the time.

Further sea trials were planned but were abruptly cut short by orders of PLAN, due to an accident of People's Liberation Army Navy Submarine Force. At 1:40 PM on December 1, 1959, Chinese midget submarine National Defense 24 with hull number 418 (ex-Soviet M-class submarine No. M-279) sunk in a naval exercise after colliding with a frigate when surfacing, resulting in 38 out of 39 people on board killed. PLAN investigation and actions taken afterward lead to an audit across the PLAN, including reviews of all programs hastily rushed into development in the political zealousness of Great Leap Forward. Type 032 midget submarine was identified as a potential safety hazard because the design did not include any escape system for the crew, so further sea trials were stopped and the midget sub was returned to Jiangnan Shipyard to be modified. However, due to the political zealousness, the design of the escape system could not be completed because the poor quality and unavailability of the components, so incorporation of additional batteries was to be completed as the first step of modification. Type 032-1 was therefore lengthened an additional 2.7 meter to 16.7 meter to house more batteries to extend the range and endurance. Although the result was satisfactory, further work could not proceed due to the lack of other subsystems, which dragged on until another political turmoil that finally killed the Type 032 series for good, namely, the Cultural Revolution, during which Type 032-1 was finally sold for scrap.

== Type 032 ==
Type 032 is the armed version of the midget submarine series. Unlike the lead battery powered prototype Type 032-1, Type 032 was to be powered by silver-zinc batteries and a water cooled diesel engines. The high performance silver-zinc battery is much more efficient than the lead battery used on the prototype and thus far less numbers of batteries would be needed, and the space saved would be used for two torpedoes and the diesel engine.

However, due to the political turmoil in China at the time, the diesel engine was never completed even after the program was terminated, despite the fact that the development of such engine was already started before the construction of the prototype. The silver-zinc battery suffered even greater in that the poor quality caused a 100% rejection after delivery when inspected by Deng Rui-San and other inspection team members. As result, Type 032 could not proceed as planned, and came to a complete stop. However, the partially started Type 032 did find its greatest use in supporting its prototype Type 032-1, which was suffering from the same quality and unavailability of subsystems problems. To keep the schedule of the prototype Type 032-1, available and qualified subsystems of the stopped production Type 032 were used on the prototype, and further construction of Type 032 and its subsystems were stopped by the order of Senior colonel Yu Xiao-Hong (于笑虹), until qualified parts and resources become available. Although Type 032-1/032 program was cancelled after only a single prototype was built, it did provide PLAN significant know-how on teardrop hull and important program managerial experience, which was used on the development of future Chinese submarines to avoid the same mistakes.
