= A32 =

A32, A 32, A.32 or A-32 may refer to:

== Aircraft ==
- Aero A.32, a Czech ground attack aircraft built before World War II
- Brewster XA-32, an American ground attack aircraft from World War II
- The Saab 32 Lansen's attack variant, known as the A 32A
- Focke-Wulf A 32, a 1930 German small airliner
- Junkers A 32, a 1926 German mailplane
- Aeroprakt A-32 Vixxen, Ukrainian two-seat, high-wing, tricycle gear ultralight aircraft

== Vehicles ==
- A-32 medium tank, a prototype for the T-34
- The Nissan A32 mid-size sedan platform, used by the Nissan Maxima, Cefiro, Infiniti I30 and Renault Samsung SM5

== Roads ==
- A32 road (England), a road in Hampshire connecting Gosport and Alton
- A32 motorway (France), a proposed road to connect the border with Luxembourg and Toul
- A32 road (Isle of Man), a road connecting Port Erin and Ballasalla road
- Autostrada A32 (Italy), a road connecting Turin and Bardonecchia
- A32 motorway (Netherlands), a road connecting Meppel and Leeuwarden
- A32 motorway (Spain), a road connecting Jaén and Albacete
- A32 road (Sri Lanka), a road connecting Navankuli-Mannar
- Barrier Highway (numbered A32), a highway in New South Wales and South Australia, Australia
- Great Western Highway, part of which is numbered A32, a highway in New South Wales, Australia

== Other ==
- Samsung Galaxy A32, an Android smartphone by Samsung
- A32, German A class torpedo boat, later served as "ENS Sulev (torpedo boat)" in the Estonian Navy and as "Amethyst" in the Soviet Navy
- English Opening, in the Encyclopaedia of Chess Openings
- Butte Valley Airport (FAA location identification code A32)
- HLA-A32, a human serotype
