= 30 Seconds =

30 Seconds or Thirty Seconds may refer to:

- 30 Seconds (game), a general-knowledge board game
- 30 Seconds (TV series), an Australian comedy series
- "30 Seconds" (Alias), a television episode
- "30 Seconds", a song by Tracy Bonham from The Burdens of Being Upright

== See also ==
- Thirty Seconds Over Tokyo, 1944 American war film
- Thirty Seconds Over Winterland, 1972 album by the American psychedelic rock band Jefferson Airplane
- Thirty Seconds of Love, 1936 Italian romantic comedy film
- Thirty Seconds to Mars, American rock band
