= List of highways numbered 32B =

The following highways are numbered 32B:

== United States ==
- Hawaii Route 32B
- County Road 32B (Levy County, Florida)
- New York State Route 32B (former)
  - County Route 32B (Suffolk County, New York)
