= 32nd Brigade Royal Field Artillery =

XXXII Brigade, Royal Field Artillery was a brigade (Note: The basic organic unit of the Royal Artillery was, and is, the Battery. When grouped together they formed brigades, in the same way that infantry battalions or cavalry regiments were grouped together in brigades. At the outbreak of World War I, a field artillery brigade of headquarters (4 officers, 37 other ranks), three batteries (5 and 193 each), and a brigade ammunition column (4 and 154) had a total strength just under 800 so was broadly comparable to an infantry battalion (just over 1,000) or a cavalry regiment (about 550). Like an infantry battalion, an artillery brigade was usually commanded by a Lieutenant-Colonel. Artillery brigades were redesignated as regiments in 1938.) of the Royal Field Artillery which served in the First World War.

It was originally formed with 27th, 134th and 135th Batteries, and attached to 4th Infantry Division. In August 1914 it mobilised and was sent to the Continent with the British Expeditionary Force, where it saw service with 2nd Division throughout the war. A howitzer battery was formed in May 1916, from a section of each of 86th (Howitzer) and 128th (Howitzer) Batteries, and designated D Battery; it was disbanded in January 1917, and replaced by 86th (Howitzer) Battery. The 86th and 135th batteries deployed to North Russia from 1918 to 1919.
