= Samsung Galaxy A33 5G =

2022 Android smartphone by Samsung

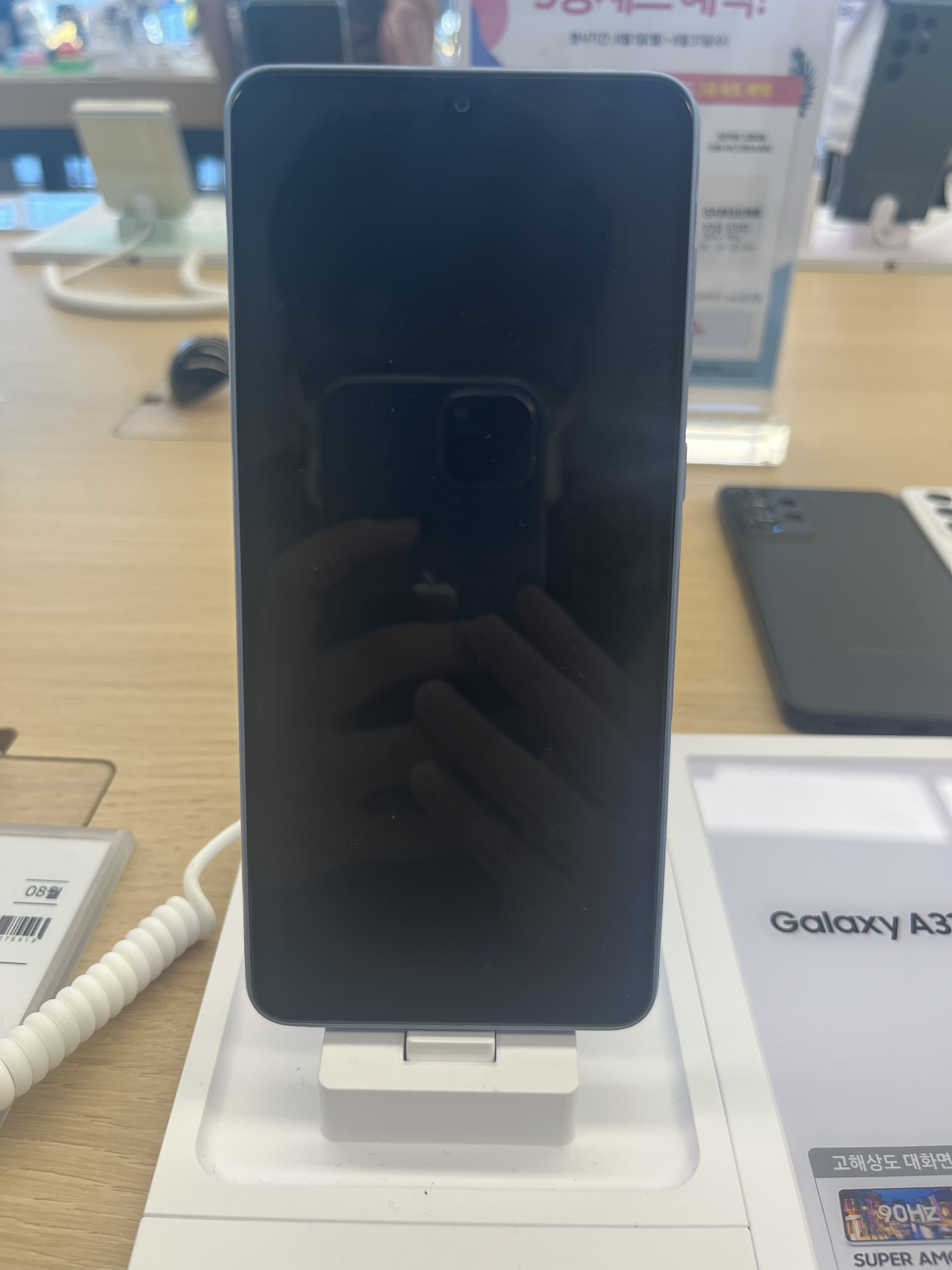
- Front of Samsung Galaxy A33 5G
- Brand: Samsung
- Manufacturer: Samsung Electronics
- Type: Smartphone
- Series: Galaxy A series
- First released: March 17, 2022; 4 years ago
- Predecessor: Samsung Galaxy A32
- Successor: Samsung Galaxy A34 5G
- Related: Samsung Galaxy A13; Samsung Galaxy A23; Samsung Galaxy A53 5G; Samsung Galaxy A73 5G
- Compatible networks: GSM / HSPA / LTE / 5G
- Form factor: Slate
- Colors: Awesome Black, Awesome White, Awesome Blue, Awesome Peach
- Dimensions: 159.7 mm (6.29 in) H 74 mm (2.9 in) W 8.1 mm (0.32 in) D
- Weight: 186 g (6.6 oz)
- Operating system: Original: Android 12 with One UI 4.1; Current: Android 16 with One UI 8
- System-on-chip: Exynos 1280 (Samsung 5 nm)
- CPU: Octa-core (2x2.4 GHz Cortex-A78 & 6x2.0 GHz Cortex-A55)
- GPU: Mali-G68 MP4
- Memory: 6 GB, 8 GB RAM LPDDR4X
- Storage: 128 GB, 256 GB
- Removable storage: microSDXC
- SIM: Single SIM (Nano-SIM) or Hybrid Dual SIM (Nano-SIM, dual stand-by)
- Battery: 5000 mAh
- Charging: Fast charging 25W
- Rear camera: Quad-Camera Setup; Primary: Sony IMX 582; 48 MP, f/1.8, 25mm, FoV 81.4°, 1/2.0", 0.8µm, PDAF, OIS; Ultrawide: Sony IMX 355; 8 MP, f/2.2, 13mm, FoV 116.3°, 1/4.0", 1.12µm, FF; Macro: GalaxyCore GC5035; 5 MP, f/2.4, 25mm, 1/5.0", 1.12μm, FF; Depth: GalaxyCore GC02M1B; 2 MP, f/2.4, 1/5.0", 1.75μm; Camera features: LED flash, panorama, HDR; Video recording: 4K@30fps, 1080p@30/60fps, 720p@30fps
- Front camera: Sony IMX 258; 13 MP, f/2.2, 25mm (wide), FoV 80.9°, 1/3.06", 1.12µm, FF; Video recording: 4K@30fps, 1080p@30fps, 720p@30fps
- Display: 6.4 in (160 mm), Infinity-U Display; 1080 x 2400 pixels, 20:9 ratio (~411 ppi density); Super AMOLED, 90Hz refresh rate Corning Gorilla Glass 5
- Sound: Stereo speakers
- Connectivity: Wi-Fi 802.11 a/b/g/n/ac, dual-band, Wi-Fi Direct, hotspot Bluetooth 5.1, A2DP, LE; A-GPS, GLONASS, GALILEO, BDS
- Data inputs: Multi-touch screen USB Type-C 2.0; Sensors: Fingerprint scanner (side-mounted); Accelerometer; Gyroscope; Compass
- Water resistance: IP67 dust/water resistant (up to 1m for 30 mins)
- Model: SM-A336

The Samsung Galaxy A33 5G is a mid-range Android-based smartphone developed and manufactured by Samsung Electronics as a part of its Galaxy A series. The phone was announced on 17 March 2022 at the Galaxy Unpacked event alongside the Galaxy A53 5G and Galaxy A73 5G. It is the first Galaxy A3x device to not include a headphone jack and to be released with 5G connectivity only.

== Specifications ==
=== Design ===
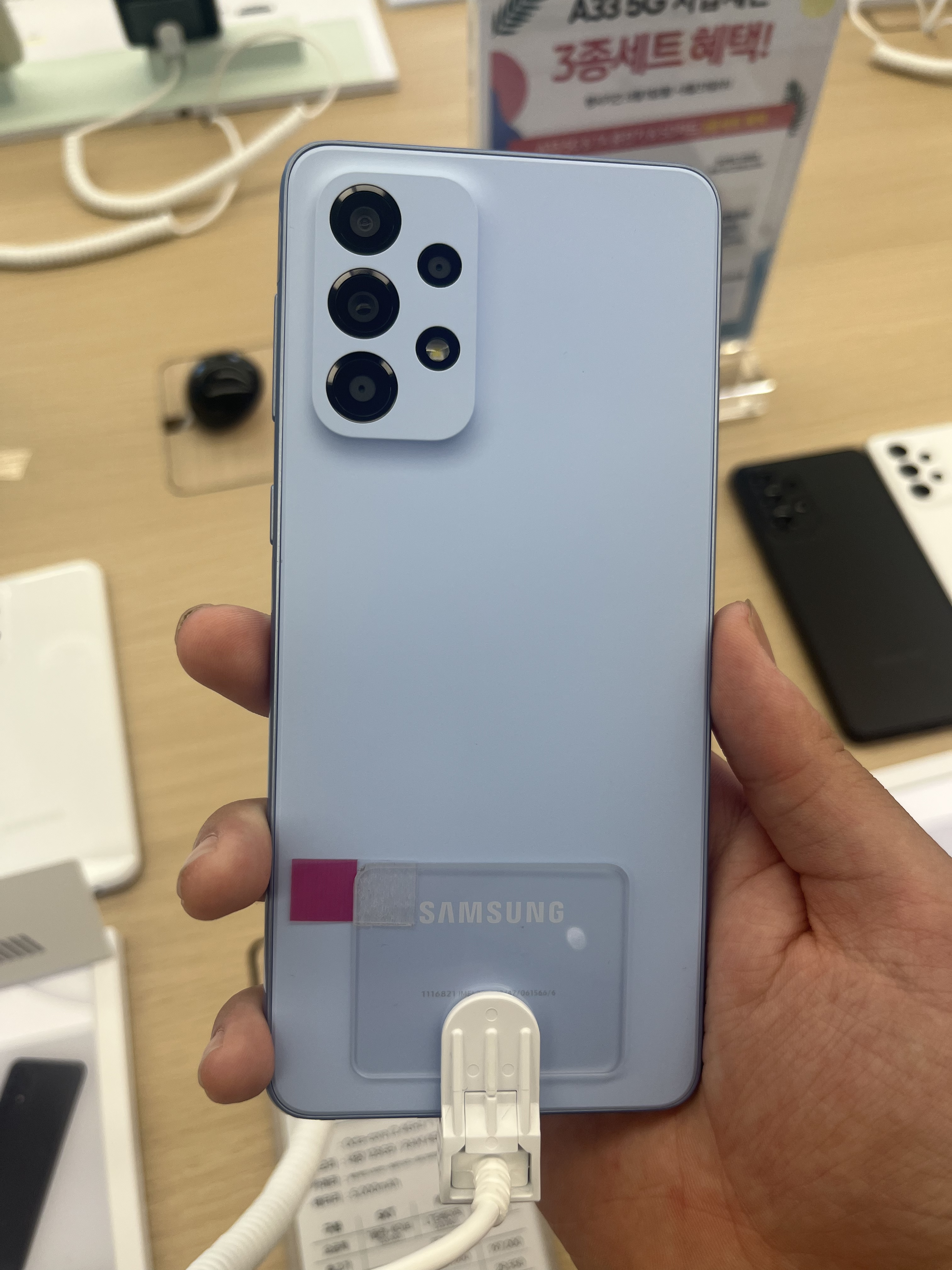
Back of the Samsung Galaxy A33 5G

The screen is made of Corning Gorilla Glass 5. The back panel and sides are made of matte plastic, similar to the Galaxy A53 5G and Galaxy A73 5G. The Galaxy A33, unlike the Galaxy A32, does not have a 3.5mm audio jack. Also, the Galaxy A33 has protection against moisture and dust according to the IP67 standard.

On the bottom are the USB-C connector, speaker and microphone. The second microphone is located on the top and, depending on the version, a slot for 1 SIM card and a microSD memory card up to 1 TB or a hybrid slot for 2 SIM cards. On the right side are the volume buttons and the power button.

Galaxy A33 5G
- Awesome Black
- Awesome White
- Awesome Blue
- Awesome Peach

=== Hardware ===
The Galaxy A33 5G is a smartphone with a slate-type factor form, which is 159.7 × 74 × 8.1 mm in size and weighs 186 grams.

The device is equipped with GSM, HSPA, LTE and 5G connectivity, Wi-Fi 802.A/b/g/n/ac dual-band with Bluetooth 5 Wi-Fi Direct support and hotspot support.1 with A2DP and LE, GPS with BeiDou, Galileo, GLONASS and QZSS and NFC. It has a USB-C 2.0 port. It lacks a 3.5mm headphone jack, a first for the mid-range Galaxy A series.

==== Display ====
It has a 6.4 inch Super AMOLED with Infinity-U "waterdrop" notch, rounded corners and FHD+ resolution of 1080 × 2400 pixels and 90hz refresh rate. As a protection, it uses Gorilla Glass 5.

==== Battery ====
Similar to the Galaxy A53, it has a 5000 mAh lithium-polymer battery and supports fast charging at 25W.

==== Processor ====
The chipset is a Samsung Exynos 1280 with an octa-core CPU (2 ARM Cortex-A78 cores at 2.4 GHz and 6 Cortex-A55 cores at 2 GHz), also used on the Galaxy A53 5G. The internal storage is 128/256 GB (both use UFS 2.2) and is expandable with a microSD card, while the RAM is 6 or 8 GB.

==== Camera ====
The Galaxy A33's rear camera array features four cameras, also similar to its predecessor, consisting of a 48 MP main camera, a 8 MP ultrawide camera, a 5 MP macro camera, and a 5 MP depth camera.

The main camera is equipped with a PDAF, OIS and HDR mode, capable of recording up to 4K 30fps videos, while the front camera is a single 13 MP sensor.

=== Software ===
The original operating system is Android 12 with One UI 4.1. In April 2022, Samsung announced that the Galaxy A33 5G along with a selection of other Samsung Galaxy devices, would be supported for four generations of Android software updates, and 5 years of security updates, unlike their predecessors.

	Pre-installed OS	OS Upgrades history				End of support
	Pre-installed OS	1st	2nd	3rd	4th	End of support
A33 5G	Android 12 (One UI 4.1)	Android 13 (One UI 5.0); November 2022 (One UI 5.1); February 2023	Android 14 (One UI 6.0); December 2023 (One UI 6.1); May 2024	Android 15 (One UI 7.0); May 2025	Android 16 (One UI 8.0); October 2025	Expected within 2027
