= Channel 32 TV stations in Canada =

The following television stations broadcast on digital or analog channel 32 in Canada:

- CFSO-TV in Cardston, Alberta
- CHBC-DT-1 in Penticton, British Columbia
- CHCH-TV-6 in North Bay, Ontario
- CICO-DT-32 in Windsor, Ontario
- CIVK-DT-1 in Gascons, Quebec
- CIVT-DT in Vancouver, British Columbia
- CKCS-DT in Calgary, Alberta
