= 32nd Division =

In military terms, 32nd Division may refer to:

== Infantry divisions ==
- 32nd Infantry Division (France)
- 32nd Division (German Empire)
- 32nd Infantry Division (Wehrmacht), Germany
- 32nd SS Volunteer Grenadier Division, Germany
- 32nd Infantry Division "Marche", Kingdom of Italy
- 32nd Motorized Division "Trento", Italy
- 32nd Division (Imperial Japanese Army)
- 32nd Infantry Division (Russian Empire)
- 32nd Guards Mechanized Division, Soviet Union
- 32nd Guards Motor Rifle Division, Soviet Union
- 32nd Motor Rifle Division, Soviet Union
- 32nd Rifle Division, Soviet Union
- 32nd Division (Spain)
- 32nd Division (United Kingdom)
- 32nd Infantry Division (United States)
- 32nd Division (Yugoslav Partisans)
- 32nd Infantry Division Triglavski, Yugoslavia

== Cavalry divisions ==
- 32nd Cavalry Division, Soviet Union

== Armoured divisions ==
- 32nd Indian Armoured Division
- 32nd Guards Tank Division, Soviet Union
- 32nd Tank Division (Soviet Union)

== Aviation divisions ==
- 32nd Air Division, United States
- 32nd Aviation Division, Yugoslavia

== See also ==
- 32nd Division Memorial Highway
- List of military divisions by number
- 32nd Army (disambiguation)
- XXXII Corps (disambiguation)
- 32nd Brigade (disambiguation)
- 32nd Regiment (disambiguation)
- 32nd Battalion (disambiguation)
- 32nd Squadron (disambiguation)
