= 32nd Cavalry (Pakistan) =

Armoured regiment of the Pakistan Army

- Badge of 32nd Cavalry
- Active: 1964 - present
- Country: Pakistan
- Branch: Pakistan Army
- Type: Armoured Regiment
- Nicknames: Conquerers; Raiders Of The Dawn

32 Cavalry "Raiders Of The Dawn" is an armoured regiment of the Pakistani Army. It became known when the two protagonist of the famous drama serial Alpha Bravo Charlie joined 32 cavalry after passing out from Pakistan Military Academy.
