= Channel 32 TV stations in Mexico =

The following television stations broadcast on digital or analog channel 32 in Mexico:

- XEW-TDT in Mexico City
- XEWT-TDT in Tijuana, Baja California
- XHACN-TDT in Acaponeta y Tecuala, Nayarit
- XHAGU-TDT in Aguascalientes, Aguascalientes
- XHANT-TDT in Autlán de Navarro, Jalisco
- XHAP-TDT in Acapulco, Guerrero
- XHAUC-TDT in Chihuahua, Chihuahua
- XHAZL-TDT in Cerro Azul, Veracruz
- XHBO-TDT in Oaxaca, Oaxaca
- XHBUR-TDT in Morelia, Michoacán de Ocampo
- XHCUA-TDT in Culiacán, Sinaloa
- XHDRG-TDT in Durango, Durango
- XHHUC-TDT in Huixtla (El Triunfo), Chiapas
- XHI-TDT in Ciudad Obregón, Sonora
- XHIJ-TDT in Ciudad Juárez, Chihuahua
- XHLRT-TDT in San Luis Rio Colorado, Sonora
- XHMOY-TDT in Monterrey, Nuevo León
- XHNAT-TDT in Nuevo Laredo, Tamaulipas
- XHOCC-TDT in Ocosingo, Chiapas
- XHOPCC-TDT in Campeche, Campeche
- XHPNG-TDT in Piedras Negras, Coahuila
- XHPNO-TDT in Santiago Pinotepa Nacional, Oaxaca
- XHSTE-TDT in Santiago Tuxtla, Veracruz
- XHSZT-TDT in Soto La Marina, Tamaulipas
- XHTMPT-TDT in Puebla, Puebla
- XHTMQR-TDT in Cancún, Quintana Roo
- XHVIZ-TDT in Villahermosa, Tabasco
- XHVST-TDT in Ciudad Valles, San Luis Potosí
- XHVTT-TDT in Valladolid and Tizimín, Yucatán
- XHWVT-TDT in Arriaga and Tonalá, Chiapas
- XHZ-TDT in Querétaro, Querétaro
