= New York State Route 33B =

New York State Route 33B may refer to:

- New York State Route 33B (1931–1940s) in Monroe and Wayne Counties
- New York State Route 33B (1962–1965) in Monroe County
- New York State Route 33B (1965–1974) in Erie County
