= List of highways numbered 33A =

The following highways are numbered 33A:

== United States ==
- Florida State Road 33A (former)
- Missouri Route 33A (former)
- Nevada State Route 33A (former)
- New York State Route 33A
  - County Route 33A (Rockland County, New York)
  - County Route 33A (Suffolk County, New York)
