= South Carolina Highway 32 =

South Carolina Highway 32 may refer to:

- South Carolina Highway 32 (1920s), a former state highway from near Henderson to near Jacksonboro
- South Carolina Highway 32 (1920s–1950s), a former state highway from Gardens Corner to Jacksonboro
