= 32nd Brigade =

32nd Brigade or 32nd Infantry Brigade may refer to:

== Australia ==
- 32nd Brigade (Australia), an infantry brigade in the Second World War

== Canada ==
- 32 Canadian Brigade Group, a unit of the Canadian Army

== Greece ==
- 32nd Marines Brigade, a unit of the Greek Army

== India ==
- 32nd (Imperial Service) Brigade of the British Indian Army in the First World War
- 32nd Indian Infantry Brigade of the British Indian Army in the Second World War

== Italy ==
- 32nd Armored Brigade "Mameli"

== Libya ==
- 32nd Reinforced Brigade of the Armed People, an elite, special-forces unit of the Libyan military, often referred to as the "Khamis Brigade", after its commander, Khamis Gaddafi.

== Ukraine ==
- 32nd Artillery Brigade (Ukraine)
- 32nd Mechanized Brigade

== United Kingdom ==
- 32nd (Midland) Anti-Aircraft Brigade
- 32nd Infantry Brigade (United Kingdom)
- 32nd Army Tank Brigade
- 32nd Brigade Royal Field Artillery
- 32nd Divisional Trench Mortar Brigade

== United States ==
- 32nd Antiaircraft Artillery Brigade
- 32nd Infantry Brigade Combat Team
- 32nd Medical Brigade

== See also ==
- 32nd Division (disambiguation)
- 32nd Regiment (disambiguation)
- 32nd Battalion (disambiguation)
- 32nd Squadron (disambiguation)
