= 32 Squadron =

32 Squadron or 32nd Squadron may refer to:

- No. 32 Squadron RAAF, a unit of the Royal Australian Air Force
- No. 32 Squadron (Finland), a unit of the Finnish Air Force
- No. 32 (The Royal) Squadron RAF, a unit of the United Kingdom Royal Air Force
- VFA-32 (Strike Fighter Squadron 32), a unit of the United States Navy

== See also ==
- 32nd Division (disambiguation)
- 32nd Brigade (disambiguation)
- 32nd Regiment (disambiguation)
- 32nd Battalion (disambiguation)
