= 32nd Battalion =

32nd Battalion, 32 Battalion or 32nd Infantry Battalion may refer to:

- 32nd Battalion (Australia), a unit of the Australian Army
- 2/32nd Battalion (Australia), a unit of the Australian Army that served during World War II
- 32 Battalion (South Africa), a unit of the South African Army
  - 32 Battalion (book), a 2004 book written by Piet Nortje
- 32nd Battalion, CEF, a Canadian unit raised for service in World War I
- 32nd Virginia Cavalry Battalion, a unit of the Confederate States Army
- 32nd Signal Battalion (United States), a unit of the United States Army
- 32nd (Reserve) Battalion, Royal Northumberland Fusiliers, a British unit raised for service during World War I

== See also ==
- 32nd Division (disambiguation)
- 32nd Brigade (disambiguation)
- 32nd Regiment (disambiguation)
- 32nd Squadron (disambiguation)
