= 32nd Regiment =

32nd Regiment or 32nd Infantry Regiment may refer to:

== Infantry regiments ==
- 32nd (Cornwall) Regiment of Foot, a unit of the United Kingdom Army
- 32nd Infantry Regiment (United States), a unit of the United States Army
- 32nd Infantry Regiment (Greece)

== Armour regiments ==
- 32nd Armor Regiment (United States), a unit of the United States Army

== Artillery regiments ==
- 32nd Regiment Royal Artillery, a unit of the United Kingdom Army
- Post Office Rifles (32nd Searchlight Regiment), a unit of the United Kingdom Army
- 32nd Field Artillery Regiment, a unit of the United States Army

== Engineer regiments ==
- 32 Combat Engineer Regiment, a unit of the Canadian Army
- 32nd Alpine Engineer Regiment, a unit of the Italian Army
- 32 Engineer Regiment (United Kingdom), a unit of the British Army's Royal Engineers

== Signal regiments ==
- 32 (Scottish) Signal Regiment, a unit of the British Army

== American Civil War Regiments ==
- 32nd Regiment Alabama Infantry
- 32nd Illinois Volunteer Infantry Regiment
- 32nd Regiment Indiana Infantry
- 32nd Iowa Volunteer Infantry Regiment
- 32nd Regiment Kentucky Volunteer Infantry
- 32nd Maine Infantry
- 32nd Regiment of New York Volunteers
- 32nd Wisconsin Volunteer Infantry Regiment

== See also ==
- 32nd Division (disambiguation)
- 32nd Brigade (disambiguation)
- 32nd Battalion (disambiguation)
- 32nd Squadron (disambiguation)
