= Comparison of Samsung Galaxy S smartphones =

Comparison between smartphones in the Samsung Galaxy S Series

The following is a comparative list of smartphones belonging to smartphones in the Samsung Galaxy S series line of devices, using the Android operating system. This table is primarily intended to show the differences between the model families of phones in the Galaxy S series. The list only covers unlocked and international devices.

== Galaxy S ==
	Samsung Galaxy S					
	i9000 (Note: Samsung I9000 Galaxy S, GSMArena.com) (original model)	Plus i9001 (Note: Samsung I9001 Galaxy S Plus, GSMArena.com)	Advance i9070 (Note: Samsung I9070 Galaxy S Advance, GSMArena.com)	Duos S7562 (Note: Samsung S7562 Galaxy S Duos, GSMArena.com)	Duos 2 S7582 (Note: Samsung S7582 Galaxy S Duos 2, GSMArena.com)	Duos 3 G316 (Note: Samsung G316 Galaxy S Duos 3, GSMArena.com)
Release date	June 2010	July 2011	April 2012	September 2012	December 2013	June 2014
Dimensions (H×W×D) [mm]	122.4 × 64.2 × 9.9		123.2 × 63.0 × 9.7	121.5 × 63.1 × 10.6		
Weight [g]	119		120	118		
Android	2.1 → 2.3	2.3	2.3.6 → 4.1.2	4.0	4.2.2	4.4.2
Display diagonal [in]	4.0					
Display resolution [px×px]	WVGA (480×800)					
Display density [px/in]	233					
Display type	Super AMOLED			TFT		
SoC	Samsung Exynos 3110 (Hummingbird)	Qualcomm Snapdragon S2 MSM8255T	ST-Ericsson NovaThor U8500	Qualcomm Snapdragon S1 MSM7227A	Broadcom BCM21664	Broadcom BCM21663
CPU	1.0 GHz single-core ARM Cortex-A8	1.4 GHz single-core Qualcomm Scorpion	1.0 GHz dual-core ARM Cortex-A9	1.0 GHz single-core ARM Cortex-A5	1.2 GHz dual-core ARM Cortex-A9	
GPU	IT PowerVR SGX540 (200 MHz)	Qualcomm Adreno 205	ARM Mali-400MP1	Qualcomm Adreno 200	Broadcom VideoCore IV	Broadcom VideoCore IV HW
RAM	512 MB		768 MB			512 MB
Storage	8 or 16 GB			4 GB		
Expandable Storage	microSD (max 32 GB)				microSD (max 64 GB)	
2G GSM/GPRS/EDGE	850/900/1800/1900 MHz					
3G WCDMA/HSPA	900/1900/2100 MHz					
4G LTE	Optional	No				
WiFi	802.11b/g/n, Hotspot				802.11a/b/g/n, Hotspot	
Bluetooth	Bluetooth 3.0				Bluetooth 3.0+HS	
NFC	No					
USB port	microUSB 2.0					
Rear Camera	5 MP					
Rear Video	720p@30fps			VGA@30fps	720p@30fps	
Front Camera	VGA (0.3 MP)		1.3 MP	VGA (0.3 MP)		
Wireless charging (Qi)	No					
Battery	1,500 mAh user-replaceable	1,650 mAh user-replaceable	1,500 mAh user-replaceable			
Sensors	Accelerometer, front-facing proximity, digital compass					
	i9000 (original model)	Plus i9001	Advance i9070	Duos S7562	Duos 2 S7582	Duos 3 G316
Samsung Galaxy S

== Galaxy S2 ==
	Samsung Galaxy S II				
	i9100 (Note: Samsung I9100 Galaxy S II, GSMArena.com)	i9100G (Note: Samsung I9100G Galaxy S II, GSMArena.com)	i9210 HD LTE (Note: Samsung I9210 Galaxy S II HD LTE, GSMArena.com)	S II Plus i9105 (Note: Samsung I9105 Galaxy SII Plus, GSMArena.com)	S II TV S7273T (Note: Samsung Galaxy S II TV, GSMArena.com)
Release date	April 2011	October 2011	December 2011	February 2013	August 2013
Dimensions (H×W×D) [mm]	125.3 × 66.1 × 8.5		129.8 × 68.8 × 9.5	129.8 × 68.8 × 9.5	121.2 x 62.7 × 9.8
Weight [g]	116		130.5	116	115
Android	2.3 → 4.1.2			4.1.2 → 4.2.2	4.2
Display diagonal [in]	4.3		4.65	4.3	4.0
Display resolution [px×px]	WVGA (480×800)		HD (720x1280)	WVGA (480×800)	
Display density [px/in]	217		316	217	233
Display type	Super AMOLED Plus				TFT
SoC	Samsung Exynos 4210	TI-OMAP 4430	Qualcomm Snapdragon S3 MSM8660	Broadcom BC28155	Broadcom BCM21654
CPU	1.2 GHz dual-core ARM Cortex-A9		1.5 GHz dual-core ARM Cortex-A9	1.2 GHz dual-core ARM Cortex-A9	1.0 GHz single-core ARM Cortex-A5
GPU	ARM Mali-400MP4 (266 MHz)	IT PowerVR SGX540 (308 MHz)	Qualcomm Adreno 220	Broadcom VideoCore IV	Broadcom BCM21654
RAM [GB]	1 GB				
Storage	16 or 32 GB		16 GB	8 GB	4 GB
Expandable Storage	microSD (max 32 GB)			microSDXC (max 64 GB)	microSD
2G GSM/GPRS/EDGE	850/900/1800/1900 MHz				
3G WCDMA/HSPA	850/900/1900/2100 MHz; 1,700 MHz (T-Mobile USA only)				850/900/1800/1900 MHz
4G LTE	No		Yes	No	
WiFi	802.11a/b/g/n, Hotspot				802.11 b/g/n,Hotspot
Bluetooth	Bluetooth 3.0+HS				Bluetooth 3.0
NFC	No				
USB port	microUSB 2.0				
Rear Camera	8 MP				5 MP
Rear Video	1080p@30fps				720p@30fps
Front Camera	2 MP				VGA (0.3 MP)
Wireless charging (Qi)	No				
Battery	1,650 mAh user-replaceable		1,850 mAh user-replaceable	1,650 mAh user-replaceable	1,500 mAh user-replaceable
Sensors	Accelerometer, Gyroscope, front-facing proximity, digital compass				Accelerometer, light sensor, proximity, digital compass
	i9100	i9100G	i9210 HD LTE	S II Plus i9105	S II TV S7273T
Samsung Galaxy S II

== Galaxy S3 ==
	Samsung Galaxy S III						
	Mini i8190 (Note: Samsung I8190 Galaxy S III mini, GSMArena.com)	Mini VE i8200 (Note: Samsung I8200 Galaxy S III Mini VE, GSMArena.com)	Slim G3812B (Note: Samsung G3812B Galaxy S3 Slim, GSMArena.com)	i9300 (Note: Samsung I9300 Galaxy S III, GSMArena.com)	i9305 (Note: Samsung I9305 Galaxy S III, GSMArena.com)	Neo I9300I (Note: Samsung I9300I Galaxy S3 Neo, GSMArena.com)	Neo I9301I (Note: Samsung I9301I Galaxy S3 Neo, GSMArena.com)
Release date	November 2012	March 2014		May 2012	September 2012	April 2014	June 2014
Dimensions (H×W×D) [mm]	121.6 × 63.0 × 9.9		133.0 × 66.0 × 9.7	136.6 × 70.6 × 8.6			
Weight [g]	111	112	139	133		132	
Android	4.1.2	4.2.2		4.0 → 4.3	4.1 → 4.4.4	4.3 → 4.4.4	4.4.2
Display diagonal [in]	4.0		4.5	4.8			
Display resolution [px×px]	WVGA (480×800)		qHD (540×960)	HD (720×1280)			
Display density [px/in]	233		244	306			
Display type	Super AMOLED		TFT	Super AMOLED			
SoC	ST-Ericsson NovaThor U8420	Marvell PXA986	Marvell PXA1088	Samsung Exynos 4412 Quad		Qualcomm Snapdragon 400 MSM8226	Qualcomm Snapdragon 400 MSM8228
CPU	1.0 GHz dual-core ARM Cortex-A9	1.2 GHz dual-core ARM Cortex-A9	1.2 GHz quad-core ARM Cortex-A7	1.4 GHz quad-core ARM Cortex-A9		1.2 GHz quad-core ARM Cortex-A7	1.4 GHz quad-core ARM Cortex-A7
GPU	ARM Mali-400MP1	Vivante GC1000		ARM Mali-400MP4 (400 MHz)		Qualcomm Adreno 305	
RAM [GB]	1 GB				2 GB	1.5 GB	
Storage	8 or 16 GB		8 GB	16, 32 or 64 GB		16 GB	
Expandable Storage	microSD (max 32 GB)			microSDXC (max 64 GB)			
2G GSM/GPRS/EDGE	850/900/1800/1900 MHz						
3G WCDMA/HSPA	850/900/1900/2100 MHz						
4G LTE	No				Yes	No	
WiFi	802.11a/b/g/n, Hotspot, Wi-Fi Direct						
Bluetooth	Bluetooth 4.0+LE						
NFC	Optional		No	Yes			
USB port	microUSB 2.0						
Rear Camera	5 MP			8 MP			
Rear Video	720p@30fps			1080p@30fps			
Still photo during video (rear camera)				6 MP (3264×1836)			
Front Camera	VGA (0.3 MP)			1.9 MP (with 720p@30fps video recording)			
Wireless charging (Qi)	No			Retrofittable using back cover		No	
Battery	1,500 mAh user-replaceable		2,100 mAh user-replaceable				
Sensors	Accelerometer, gyroscope, front-facing proximity, compass, barometer, brightness sensor						
	Mini i8190	Mini VE i8200	Slim G3812B	i9300	i9305	Neo I9300I	Neo I9301I
Samsung Galaxy S III

== Galaxy S4 ==
	Samsung Galaxy S4				
	Zoom SM-C101 (Note: Samsung SM-C101 Galaxy S4 Zoom, GSMArena.com)	Mini i9190 (Note: Samsung I9190 Galaxy S4 mini, GSMArena.com)	Active i9295 (Note: Samsung I9295 Galaxy S4 Active, GSMArena.com)	i9505 (Note: Samsung I9505 Galaxy S4, GSMArena.com)	i9500 (Note: Samsung I9500 Galaxy S4, GSMArena.com)
Release date	July 2013		June 2013	April 2013	
Dimensions (H×W×D) [mm]	125.5 × 63.5 × 15.4	124.6 × 61.3 × 8.9	139.7 × 71.3 × 9.1	136.6 × 69.8 × 7.9	
Weight [g]	208	107	153	130	
Android	4.2.2 → 4.4.2		4.2.2 → 5.0.1		
Display diagonal [in]	4.3		5.0		
Display resolution [px×px]	qHD (540×960)		Full-HD (1080×1920)		
Display density [px/in]	256		441		
Display type	Super AMOLED		TFT	Super AMOLED	
SoC	Samsung Exynos 4212 Dual	Qualcomm Snapdragon 400 MSM8930	Qualcomm Snapdragon 600 APQ8064T		Samsung Exynos 5410 Octa
CPU	1.5 GHz dual-core ARM Cortex-A9	1.7 GHz dual-core Krait 300	1.9 GHz quad-core Krait 300		1.6 GHz quad-core ARM Cortex-A15 & 1.2 GHz quad-core ARM Cortex-A7
GPU	ARM Mali-400MP4 (400 MHz)	Qualcomm Adreno 305	Qualcomm Adreno 320		IT PowerVR SGX544MP3 (533 MHz)
RAM [GB]	1.5 GB		2 GB		
Storage	8 GB		16 GB	16, 32 or 64 GB	
Expandable Storage	microSDXC (max 64 GB)				
2G GSM/GPRS/EDGE	850/900/1800/1900 MHz				
3G WCDMA/HSPA	850/900/1900/2100 MHz				
4G LTE	Optional		Yes		No
WiFi	802.11a/b/g/n, Hotspot, Wi-Fi Direct			802.11a/b/g/n/ac, Hotspot, Dualband, Wi-Fi Direct	
Bluetooth	Bluetooth 4.0+LE				
NFC	Yes				
USB port	microUSB 2.0				
Rear Camera	8 MP			13 MP	
Rear Video	1080p@30fps				
Still photo during video (rear camera)	6 MP (3264×1836)		9.6 MP (4128×2322)		
Front Camera	1.9 MP (with 720p@30fps video recording)		2 MP (with 1080p@30fps video recording)		
Wireless charging (Qi)	No			Retrofittable using back cover	
Battery	2,330 mAh user-replaceable	1,900 mAh user-replaceable	2,600 mAh user-replaceable		
Sensors	Accelerometer, gyroscope, front-facing proximity, digital magnetic compass, brightness sensor, barometer, thermometer, hygrometer, gesture sensor, Hall-effect sensor, Self-capacitive touch (used for Air View)				
	Zoom SM-C101	Mini i9190	Active i9295	i9505	i9500
Samsung Galaxy S4

== Galaxy S5 ==
	Samsung Galaxy S5					
	Mini SM–G800F (Note: Samsung SM-G800F Galaxy S5 Mini, pdadb.net)	Active SM–G870A (Note: Samsung SM-G870A Galaxy S5 Active, pdadb.net)	LTE-A SM-G906S (Note: Samsung SM-G906S Galaxy S5 LTE-A, pdadb.net)	SM–G900F (Note: Samsung SM-G900F Galaxy S5, pdadb.net)	SM–G900H (Note: Samsung SM-G900H Galaxy S5, pdadb.net)	SM-C115
Release date	July 2014	June 2014		April 2014		
Dimensions (H×W×D) [mm]	131.1 × 64.8 × 9.1	145.3 × 73.5 × 8.9	142.0 × 72.5 × 8.1			137.5 x 70.8 x 16.6
Weight [g]	120	170	145			200
Android	4.4.2 → 6.0.1					
Display diagonal [in]	4.5	5.1				4.8
Display resolution [px×px]	HD (720×1280)	Full-HD (1080×1920)	Quad-HD (1440×2560)	Full-HD (1080×1920)		HD (1280x720)
Display density [px/in]	326	432	576	432		306
Display type	Super AMOLED					
SoC	Samsung Exynos 3470 Quad	Qualcomm Snapdragon 801 MSM8974AC	Qualcomm Snapdragon 805 APQ8084	Qualcomm Snapdragon 801 MSM8974AC	Samsung Exynos 5422 Octa	Samsung Exynos 5260 Hexa
CPU	1.4 GHz quad-core ARM Cortex-A7	2.5 GHz quad-core Krait 400			1.9 GHz quad-core ARM Cortex-A15 & 1.3 GHz quad-core ARM Cortex-A7	1.7 GHz dual-core ARM Cortex-A15 & 1.3 GHz quad-core ARM Cortex-A7
GPU	ARM Mali-400MP4 (450 MHz)	Qualcomm Adreno 330	Qualcomm Adreno 420	Qualcomm Adreno 330	ARM Mali-T628MP6	ARM Mali-T624
RAM [GB]	1.5 GB	2 GB	3 GB	2 GB		
Storage	16 GB	16, 32 GB	32 GB	16, 32 GB		8 or 16 GB
Expandable Storage	microSDXC (max 64 GB)					
2G GSM/GPRS/EDGE	850/900/1800/1900 MHz					
3G WCDMA/HSPA	850/900/1900/2100 MHz					
4G LTE	Yes				No	Yes
WiFi	802.11a/b/g/n/ac, Hotspot, Dualband, Wi-Fi Direct					
Bluetooth	Bluetooth 4.0+LE					
NFC	Yes					
USB port	microUSB 2.0					
Rear Camera	8 MP	16 MP				20.7 MP
Rear Video	2160p@30fps, 1080p@60fps, 720p@120fps (no audio)					1080p@60fps
Still photo during video (rear camera)						3.2 MP
Front Camera	2 MP (with 1080p video recording)					2 MP
Wireless charging (Qi)	No	Yes (with charging cover)				No
Battery	2,100 mAh user-replaceable	2,800 mAh user-replaceable				2,430 mAh non-replaceable
Sensors	Accelerometer, gyro, proximity, compass, Self-capacitive touch layer (for Air View)					
	Mini SM–G800F	Active SM–G870A	LTE-A SM-G906S	SM–G900F	SM–G900H	SM-C115
Samsung Galaxy S5

== Galaxy S6 ==
	Samsung Galaxy S6			
	SM–G920F (Note: Samsung SM-G920F Galaxy S6, pdadb.net)	Edge SM–G925F (Note: Samsung SM-G925F Galaxy S6 Edge, pdadb.net)	Active SM–G890A (Note: Samsung SM-G890A Galaxy S6 Active, pdadb.net)	Edge+ SM-G928F (Note: Samsung SM-G928F Galaxy S6 Edge+, pdadb.net)
Release date	April 2015		July 2015	August 2015
Dimensions (H×W×D) [mm]	143.4 x 70.5 x 6.8	142.1 x 70.1 x 7	146.9 x 73.4 x 8.8	154.4 x 75.8 x 6.9
Weight [g]	138	132	150	153
Android	5.0.2 → 7.0			5.1.1 → 7.0
Display diagonal [in]	5.1			5.7
Display resolution [px×px]	Quad-HD (1440×2560)			
Display density [px/in]	577			518
Display type	Super AMOLED			
SoC	Exynos 7420 Octa			
CPU	2.1 GHz quad-core ARM Cortex-A57 & 1.5 GHz quad-core ARM Cortex-A53			
GPU	ARM Mali-T760			
RAM [GB]	3 GB			4 GB
Storage	32, 64 or 128 GB		32 GB	32 or 64 GB
Expandable Storage	No			
2G GSM/GPRS/EDGE	850/900/1800/1900 MHz			
3G WCDMA/HSPA	850/900/1900/2100 MHz			
4G LTE	Yes			
WiFi	802.11a/b/g/n/ac, Hotspot, Dualband, Wi-Fi Direct			
Bluetooth	Bluetooth 4.1			Bluetooth 4.2
NFC	Yes			
USB port	microUSB 2.0			
Rear Camera	16 MP			
Rear Video	2160p@30fps, 1080p@60fps, 720p@120fps (with audio)			
Front Camera	5 MP (with 1440p video recording)			
Wireless charging (Qi)	Yes (native)			Yes (native; fast charge supported)
Battery	2,550 mAh non-replaceable	2,600 mAh non-replaceable	3,500 mAh non-replaceable	3,000 mAh non-replaceable
Charging speed	15 Watts via (Qualcomm Quick Charge 2.0			
Common sensors	Accelerometer, Gyroscope, Digital compass, Barometer, Front-facing proximity sensor, Brightness sensor, Heart rate sensor, SpO2			
Additional sensors				
	SM–G920F	Edge SM–G925F	Active SM–G890A	Edge+ SM-G928F
Samsung Galaxy S6

== Galaxy S7 ==
	Samsung Galaxy S7		
	SM-G930F (Note: Samsung SM-G930F Galaxy S7, pdadb.net)	Edge SM-G935F (Note: Samsung SM-G935F Galaxy S7 Edge, pdadb.net)	Active SM-G891A
Release date	March 2016		June 2016
Dimensions (H×W×D) [mm]	142.4 x 69.6 x 7.9	150.9 x 72.6 x 7.7	148.8 x 74.9 x 9.9
Weight [g]	152	157	185
Android	6.0.1 → 8.0.0		6.0.1 → 7.0
Display diagonal [in]	5.1	5.5	5.1
Display resolution [px×px]	Quad-HD (1440×2560)		
Display density [px/in]	577	534	576
Display type	Super AMOLED		
SoC	Qualcomm Snapdragon 820 (U.S. & China only); Exynos 8890 Octa		Qualcomm Snapdragon 820
CPU	Snapdragon: Dual-core 2.15 GHz Kryo & Dual-core 1.44 GHz Kryo; Exynos: 2.3 GHz quad-core Samsung Exynos M1 & 1.6 GHz quad-core ARM Cortex-A53		Dual-core 2.15 GHz Kryo & Dual-core 1.44 GHz Kryo
GPU	Snapdragon: Adreno 530 (U.S. & China only); Exynos: ARM Mali-T880		Adreno 530
RAM [GB]	4 GB		
Storage	64 GB	32, 64 or 128 GB	
Expandable Storage	microSDXC (max 256 GB)		
2G GSM/GPRS/EDGE	850/900/1800/1900 MHz		
3G WCDMA/HSPA	850/900/1900/2100 MHz		
4G LTE	Yes		
WiFi	802.11a/b/g/n/ac, Hotspot, Dualband, Wi-Fi Direct		
Bluetooth	Bluetooth 4.2		
NFC	Yes		
USB port	microUSB 2.0		
Rear Camera	12 MP		
Rear Video	2160p@30fps, 1080p@60fps, 720p@240fps (with audio)		
Front Camera	5 MP (with 1440p video recording)		
Wireless charging (Qi)	Yes (native; fast charge supported)		
Battery	3,000 mAh non-replaceable	3,600 mAh non-replaceable	4,000 mAh non-replaceable
Charging speed	15 Watts via Qualcomm Quick Charge 2.0		
Common sensors	Accelerometer, Gyroscope, Digital compass, Barometer, Front-facing proximity sensor, Brightness sensor, Heart rate sensor, SpO2		
Additional sensors			
	SM-G930F	Edge SM-G935F	Active SM-G891A
Samsung Galaxy S7

== Galaxy S8 ==
	Samsung Galaxy S8		
	SM-G950F (Note: Samsung SM-G950F Galaxy S8, pdadb.net)	Plus SM-G955F (Note: Samsung SM-G955F Galaxy S8+, pdadb.net)	Active SM-G892A/U
Release date	April 2017		August 2017
Dimensions (H×W×D) [mm]	148.9 x 68.1 x 8	159.5 x 73.4 x 8.1	151.9 × 74.9 × 9.9
Weight [g]	155	173	208
Android	7.0 → 9.0		
Display diagonal [in]	5.8	6.2	5.8
Display resolution [px×px]	Quad-HD+ (1440×2960)		
Display density [px/in]	570	529	568
Display type	Super AMOLED		
SoC	Qualcomm Snapdragon 835 (U.S. & China only); Samsung Exynos 8895 Octa		Qualcomm Snapdragon 835
CPU	Snapdragon: Octa-core (4×2.35 GHz & 4×1.9 GHz Kryo 280); Exynos: Octa-core (4×2.3 GHz Exynos M2 & 4×1.7 GHz ARM Cortex-A53)		Octa-core (4×2.35 GHz & 4×1.9 GHz Kryo 280)
GPU	Snapdragon: Adreno 540; Exynos: Mali-G71 MP20		Adreno 540
RAM [GB]	4 GB	6 GB	4 GB
Storage	64 GB		
Expandable Storage	microSDXC (max 512 GB)		
2G GSM/GPRS/EDGE	850/900/1800/1900 MHz		
3G WCDMA/HSPA	850/900/1900/2100 MHz		
4G LTE	Yes		
WiFi	802.11a/b/g/n/ac, Hotspot, Dualband, Wi-Fi Direct		
Bluetooth	Bluetooth 5.0		
NFC	Yes		
USB port	USB-C 3.1		
Rear Camera	12 MP		
Rear Video	2160p@30fps, 1080p@60fps, 720p@240fps (with audio)		
Front Camera	8 MP (with 1440p video recording)		
Wireless charging (Qi)	Yes (native; fast charge supported)		
Battery	3,000 mAh	3,500 mAh non-replaceable	4,000 mAh non-replaceable
Charging speed	15 Watts via Qualcomm Quick Charge 2.0		
Common sensors	Accelerometer, Gyroscope, Digital compass, Barometer, Front-facing proximity sensor, Brightness sensor, Heart rate sensor, SpO2		
Additional sensors	Iris recognition		
	SM-G950F	Plus SM-G955F	Active SM-G892A/U
Samsung Galaxy S8

== Galaxy S9 ==
	Samsung Galaxy S9	
	SM-G960x	Plus SM-G965x
Release date	March 2018	
Dimensions (H×W×D) [mm]	147.7 x 68.7 x 8.5	158.1 x 78.8 x 8.5
Weight [g]	163	189
Android	8.0.0 → 10.0	
Display diagonal [in]	5.8	6.2
Display resolution [px×px]	Quad-HD+ (1440×2960)	
Display density [px/in]	570	529
Display type	Super AMOLED	
SoC	Qualcomm Snapdragon 845 (USA, Canada, China, HK, Japan, and Latin America only); Samsung Exynos 9810 Octa	
CPU	Snapdragon: Octa-core (4×2.8 GHz & 4×1.7 GHz) Kryo 385; Exynos: Octa-core (4×2.7 GHz & 4×1.7 GHz)	
GPU	Snapdragon: Adreno 630; Exynos: Mali-G72 MP18	
RAM [GB]	4 GB	6 GB
Storage	64, 128 or 256 GB	
Expandable Storage	microSDXC (max 512 GB)	
2G GSM/GPRS/EDGE	850/900/1800/1900 MHz	
3G WCDMA/HSPA	850/900/1900/2100 MHz	
4G LTE	Yes	
WiFi	802.11a/b/g/n/ac, Hotspot, Dualband, Wi-Fi Direct	
Bluetooth	Bluetooth 5.0	
NFC	Yes	
USB port	USB-C 3.1	
Rear Camera	12 MP	2× 12 MP
Rear Video	4K@60fps, 1080p@120fps, 720p@240fps (with audio)	
Front Camera	8 MP (with 1440p video recording)	
Wireless charging (Qi)	Yes (native; fast charge supported)	
Battery	3,000 mAh non-replaceable	3,500 mAh non-replaceable
Charging speed	15 Watts via Qualcomm Quick Charge 2.0	
Common sensors	Accelerometer, Gyroscope, Digital compass, Barometer, Front-facing proximity sensor, Brightness sensor, Heart rate sensor, SpO2	
Additional sensors	Iris recognition	
	SM-G960x	Plus SM-G965x
Samsung Galaxy S9

== Galaxy S10 ==
	Samsung Galaxy S10				
	e SM-G970F	SM-G973F	Plus SM-G975F	5G SM-G977B	Lite SM-G770F
Release date	March 2019			April 2019	February 2020
Dimensions (H×W×D) [mm]	142.2 × 69.9 × 7.9	149.9 × 70.4 × 7.8	157.6 × 74.1 × 7.8	162.6 × 77.1 × 7.9	162.5 x 75.6 x 8.1
Weight [g]	150	157	175 or 198 (ceramic)	198	186
Android	9.0 → 12.0				10.0 → 13.0
Display diagonal [in]	5.8	6.1	6.4	6.7	
Display resolution [px×px]	Full-HD (1080×2280)	Quad-HD+ (1440×3040)			Full-HD+ (1080×2400)
Display density [px/in]	438	550	522	502	394
Display type	Dynamic AMOLED				Super AMOLED Plus
SoC	Qualcomm Snapdragon 855 (USA, China and Latin America only); Samsung Exynos 9820 Octa			Qualcomm Snapdragon 855 (USA only); Samsung Exynos 9820 Octa	Qualcomm Snapdragon 855
CPU	Exynos: Octa-core (2×2.7 GHz & 2×2.3 GHz & 4×1.95 GHz); Snapdragon: Octa-core (1×2.8 GHz & 3×2.4 GHz & 4×1.8 GHz) Kryo 485				Octa-core (1×2.8 GHz & 3×2.4 GHz & 4×1.8 GHz) Kryo 485
GPU	Exynos: Mali-G76 MP12; Snapdragon: Adreno 640				Adreno 640
RAM [GB]	6 or 8 GB	8 GB	8 or 12 GB	8 GB	6 or 8 GB
Storage	128 or 256 GB	128 or 512 GB	128 or 512 GB, 1 TB	256 or 512 GB	128 GB
Expandable Storage	microSDXC (max 512 GB)			No	microSDXC (max 512 GB)
2G GSM/GPRS/EDGE	850/900/1800/1900 MHz				
3G WCDMA/HSPA	850/900/1900/2100 MHz				
4G LTE	Yes				
5G	No			Yes	No
WiFi	802.11a/b/g/n/ac/ax, Hotspot, Dualband, Wi-Fi Direct				
Bluetooth	Bluetooth 5.0				
NFC	Yes				
USB port	USB-C 3.1				
Rear Camera	12 MP + 16 MP	2× 12 MP + 16 MP		2× 12 MP + 16 MP + ToF 3D	48 MP + 12 MP + 5 MP
Rear Video	2160p				
Front Camera	10 MP (with 4K video recording)		10 MP + 8 MP (with 4K video recording)	10 MP + ToF 3D (with 4K video recording)	32 MP (with 1080p video recording)
Wireless charging (Qi)	Yes (native; fast charge supported)				No
Battery	3,100 mAh non-replaceable	3,400 mAh non-replaceable	4,100 mAh non-replaceable	4,500 mAh non-replaceable	
Charging speeds	15 W			25 W	45 W
Common sensors	Accelerometer, Gyroscope, Digital compass, Barometer, Front-facing proximity sensor, Brightness sensor				
	e SM-G970F	SM-G973F	Plus SM-G975F	5G SM-G977B	Lite SM-G770F
Samsung Galaxy S10

== Galaxy S20 ==
Model		S20 FE SM-G781x	S20 FE 2022 SM-G781NK	S20 SM-G980x	S20+ SM-G985x	S20 Ultra SM-G988x
Dates	Announced	23 September 2020	1 April 2022	11 February 2020		
Dates	Released	2 October 2020	1 April 2022	6 March 2020		15 March 2020 (4G); 6 March 2020 (5G)
Dimensions mm (in)	Height	159.8 (6.29)		151.7 (5.97)	161.9 (6.37)	166.9 (6.57)
Dimensions mm (in)	Width	74.5 (2.93)		69.1 (2.72)	73.7 (2.90)	76.0 (2.99)
Dimensions mm (in)	Depth	8.4 (0.33)		7.9 (0.31)	7.8 (0.31)	8.8 (0.35)
Weight g (lb)		190 (0.42)		163 (0.359)	186 (0.410)	220 (0.49)
OS	Initial	One UI 2.1; Android 10	One UI 4.1; Android 12	One UI 2.1; Android 10		
OS	Latest	One UI 5.1; Android 13				
Display	Size	6.5 in (170 mm)		6.2 in (160 mm)	6.7 in (170 mm)	6.9 in (180 mm)
Display	Resolution	1080×2400		1440×3200		
Display	PPI	407		563	525	511
Display	Type	Super AMOLED		Dynamic AMOLED 2X		
SoC	Name	Samsung; Exynos 990 Octa (4G) Qualcomm; Snapdragon 865 (5G)	Qualcomm; Snapdragon 865	Samsung; Exynos 990 Octa Qualcomm; Snapdragon 865 (USA, Taiwan, China and Korea only)		
SoC	CPU	Exynos: 8-core 2 × 2.73 GHz; 2 × 2.5 GHz; 4 × 2.0 GHz Snapdragon: 8-core 1 × 2.8 GHz; 3 × 2.4 GHz; 4 × 1.8 GHz	8-core 1 × 2.8 GHz; 3 × 2.4 GHz; 4 × 1.8 GHz	Exynos: 8-core 2 × 2.73 GHz; 2 × 2.5 GHz; 4 × 2.0 GHz Snapdragon: 8-core 1 × 2.8 GHz; 3 × 2.4 GHz; 4 × 1.8 GHz		
SoC	GPU	Exynos: Mali-G77 MP11; Snapdragon: Adreno 650	Adreno 650	Exynos: Mali-G77 MP11; Snapdragon: Adreno 650		
RAM		6 or 8 GB	6 GB	8 or 12 GB		12 or 16 GB
Storage	Capacity	128 or 256 GB	128 GB		128, 256 or 512 GB	
Storage	Expandable	microSDXC (max 1.5 TB)				
Connectivity	2G GSM/GPRS/EDGE	850, 900, 1800, 1900 MHz				
Connectivity	3G WCDMA/HSPA	850, 900, 1900, 2100 MHz				
Connectivity	4G LTE	1, 2, 3, 4, 5, 7, 8, 12, 13, 17, 18, 19, 20, 25, 26, 28, 32, 38, 39, 40, 41, 66				
Connectivity	5G	1, 3, 5, 7, 8, 28, 40, 77, 78 SA/NSA/Sub6				
Connectivity	WiFi	802.11a/b/g/n/ac/ax, Hotspot, Dualband, Wi-Fi Direct				
Connectivity	Bluetooth	Bluetooth 5.0				
Connectivity	NFC	Yes				
USB port		USB-C 3.2				
Rear Camera	Wide	12 MP				108 MP
Rear Camera	Telephoto	8 MP		64 MP		—N/a
Rear Camera	Ultrawide	12 MP				
Rear Camera	Periscope	—N/a				48 MP
Rear Camera	Video	4K@30/60fps		8K@24fps		
Front Camera	Camera	32 MP		10 MP		40 MP
Front Camera	Video	4K@30/60fps, 1080p@30fps				
Colors		Cloud Lavender; Cloud Mint; Cloud Navy; Cloud White; Cloud Red; Cloud Orange	Cloud Lavender; Cloud Navy; Cloud White	Cosmic Grey; Cloud Blue; Cloud Pink; Cloud White; Aura Red	Cosmic Black; Cosmic Grey; Cloud Blue; Cloud White; Aura Red; Aura Blue	Cosmic Black; Cosmic Grey; Cloud White
Wireless charging (Qi)		Yes (native; fast charge supported)				
Battery	Capacity (mAh)	4500		4000	4500	5000
Battery	Replaceable	No				
Battery	Charging speeds	25 W			45 W	
Common sensors		Accelerometer, Gyroscope, Digital compass, Barometer, Front-facing proximity sensor, Brightness sensor				

== Galaxy S21 ==
Model		S21 FE SM-G990x	S21 SM-G991x	S21+ SM-G996x	S21 Ultra SM-G998x
Dates	Announced	4 January 2022	14 January 2021		
Dates	Released	7 January 2022	29 January 2021		
Dimensions mm (in)	Height	155.7 (6.13)	151.7 (5.97)	161.5 (6.36)	165.1 (6.50)
Dimensions mm (in)	Width	71.2 (2.80)	71.2 (2.80)	75.6 (2.98)	75.6 (2.98)
Dimensions mm (in)	Depth	7.9 (0.31)	7.9 (0.31)	7.8 (0.31)	8.9 (0.35)
Weight g (lb)		177 (0.390)	169 (0.373)	200 (0.44)	227 (0.500)
OS	Initial	One UI 4.1; Android 12	One UI 3.1; Android 11		
OS	Latest	One UI 6.1; Android 14			
Display	Size	6.4 in (160 mm)	6.2 in (160 mm)	6.7 in (170 mm)	6.8 in (170 mm)
Display	Resolution	1080×2400			1440×3200
Display	PPI	411	421	394	515
Display	Type	Dynamic AMOLED 2X			
SoC	Name	Samsung; Exynos 2100 Qualcomm; Snapdragon 888 (USA, China, Taiwan and Korea only)			
SoC	CPU	Exynos: 8-core 1 × 2.9 GHz; 3×2.8 GHz; 4×2.2 GHz Snapdragon: 8-core 1 × 2.84 GHz; 3×2.42 GHz; 4×1.8 GHz			
SoC	GPU	Exynos: Mali-G78 MP14; Snapdragon: Adreno 660			
RAM		6 or 8 GB	8 GB		12 or 16 GB
Storage	Capacity	128 or 256 GB			128, 256 or 512 GB
Storage	Expandable	No			
Connectivity	2G GSM/GPRS/EDGE	850, 900, 1800, 1900 MHz			
Connectivity	3G WCDMA/HSPA	850, 900, 1900, 2100 MHz			
Connectivity	4G LTE	1, 2, 3, 4, 5, 7, 8, 12, 13, 17, 18, 19, 20, 25, 26, 28, 32, 38, 39, 40, 41, 66			
Connectivity	5G	1, 3, 5, 7, 8, 20, 28, 38, 40, 41, 66, 77, 78 SA/NSA/Sub6			
Connectivity	WiFi	802.11a/b/g/n/ac/6, Hotspot, Dualband, Wi-Fi Direct			802.11a/b/g/n/ac/6e, Hotspot, Dualband, Wi-Fi Direct
Connectivity	Bluetooth	Bluetooth 5.0			Bluetooth 5.2
Connectivity	NFC	Yes			
USB port		USB-C 3.2			
Rear Camera	Wide	12 MP			108 MP
Rear Camera	Telephoto	8 MP	64 MP		10 MP
Rear Camera	Ultrawide	12 MP			
Rear Camera	Periscope	—N/a			10 MP
Rear Camera	Video	8K@24fps			
Front Camera	Camera	32 MP	12 MP		40 MP
Front Camera	Video	4K@30/60fps, 1080p@30fps			
Colors		White; Graphite; Lavender; Olive	Phantom White; Phantom Gray; Phantom Violet; Phantom Pink	Phantom Silver; Phantom Black; Phantom Violet; Phantom Gold; Phantom Red	Phantom White; Phantom Gray; Phantom Titanium; Phantom Navy; Phantom Brown
Wireless charging (Qi)		Yes (native; fast charge supported)			
Battery	Capacity (mAh)	4000	4800	5000	4500
Battery	Replaceable	No			
Battery	Charging speeds	25 W			
Common sensors		Accelerometer, Gyroscope, Digital compass, Barometer, Front-facing proximity sensor, Brightness sensor			

== Galaxy S22 ==
Model		S22 SM-S901x	S22+ SM-S906x	S22 Ultra SM-S908x
Dates	Announced	9 February 2022		
Dates	Released	25 February 2022		
Dimensions mm (in)	Height	146.0 (5.75)	157.4 (6.20)	163.3 (6.43)
Dimensions mm (in)	Width	70.6 (2.78)	75.8 (2.98)	77.9 (3.07)
Dimensions mm (in)	Depth	7.6 (0.30)	7.6 (0.30)	8.9 (0.35)
Weight g (lb)		167 (0.368)	195 (0.430)	228 (0.503)
OS	Initial	One UI 4.1; Android 12		
OS	Latest	One UI 8.5; Android 16		
Display	Size	6.1 in (150 mm)	6.6 in (170 mm)	6.8 in (170 mm)
Display	Resolution	1080×2340		1440×3088
Display	PPI	422	390	500
Display	Type	Dynamic AMOLED 2X		
SoC	SoC	Samsung; Exynos 2200 Qualcomm; Snapdragon 8 Gen 1 (USA, Canada, China and Korea only)		
SoC	CPU	Exynos: 8-core 1 × 2.8 GHz; 3 × 2.5 GHz; 4 × 1.7 GHz Snapdragon: 8-core 1 × 3.0 GHz; 3 × 2.5 GHz; 4 × 1.8 GHz		
SoC	GPU	Exynos: Xclipse 920; Snapdragon: Adreno 730		
RAM		8 GB		8 or 12 GB
Storage	Capacity	128 or 256 GB		128, 256, 512 or 1024 GB
Storage	Expandable	No		
Connectivity	2G GSM/GPRS/EDGE	850, 900, 1800, 1900 MHz		
Connectivity	3G WCDMA/HSPA	850, 900, 1900, 2100 MHz		
Connectivity	4G LTE	1, 2, 3, 4, 5, 7, 8, 12, 13, 17, 18, 19, 20, 25, 26, 28, 32, 38, 39, 40, 41, 66		
Connectivity	5G	1, 2, 3, 5, 7, 8, 12, 20, 25, 28, 38, 40, 41, 66, 75, 77, 78 SA/NSA/Sub6		
Connectivity	WiFi	802.11a/b/g/n/ac/6, Hotspot, Dualband, Wi-Fi Direct		
Connectivity	Bluetooth	Bluetooth 5.2		
Connectivity	NFC	Yes		
USB port		USB-C 3.2		
Rear Camera	Wide	50 MP		108 MP
Rear Camera	Telephoto	10 MP		
Rear Camera	Ultrawide	12 MP		
Rear Camera	Periscope	—N/a		10 MP
Rear Camera	Video	8K@24fps, 4K@30/60fps, 1080p@30/60/120/240fps		
Front Camera	Camera	10 MP		40 MP
Front Camera	Video	4K@30/60fps, 1080p@30fps		
Colors		Phantom White; Phantom Black; Green; Pink Gold; Graphite; Sky Blue; Cream; Violet		Phantom White; Phantom Black; Green; Burgundy; Graphite; Sky Blue; Red
Wireless charging (Qi)		Yes (native; fast charge supported)		
Battery	Capacity (mAh)	3700	4500	5000
Battery	Replaceable	No		
Battery	Charging speeds	25 W	45 W	
Common sensors		Accelerometer, Gyroscope, Digital compass, Barometer, Front-facing proximity sensor, Brightness sensor		

== Galaxy S23 ==
Model		S23 FE SM-S711x	S23 SM-S911x	S23+ SM-S916x	S23 Ultra SM-S918x
Dates	Announced	4 October 2023	1 February 2023		
Dates	Released	5 October 2023	17 February 2023		
Dimensions mm (in)	Height	158 (6.2)	146.3 (5.76)	157.8 (6.21)	163.4 (6.43)
Dimensions mm (in)	Width	76.5 (3.01)	70.9 (2.79)	76.2 (3.00)	78.1 (3.07)
Dimensions mm (in)	Depth	8.2 (0.32)	7.6 (0.30)	7.6 (0.30)	8.9 (0.35)
Weight g (lb)		209 (0.461)	168 (0.370)	196 (0.432)	234 (0.516)
OS	Initial	One UI 5.1; Android 13			
OS	Latest	One UI 9.0; Android 17			
Display	Size	6.4 in (160 mm)	6.1 in (150 mm)	6.6 in (170 mm)	6.8 in (170 mm)
Display	Resolution	1080×2340			1440×3120
Display	PPI	403	422	390	500
Display	Type	Dynamic AMOLED 2X			
SoC	Name	Samsung; Exynos 2200 Qualcomm; Snapdragon 8 Gen 2 for Galaxy (USA, Canada, China and Korea only)	Qualcomm; Snapdragon 8 Gen 2 for Galaxy		
SoC	CPU	Exynos: 8-core 1 × 2.8 GHz; 3 × 2.5 GHz; 4 × 1.8 GHz Snapdragon: 8-core 1 × 3 GHz; 3 × 2.5 GHz; 4 × 1.8 GHz	8-core 1 × 3.36 GHz; 4 × 2.8 GHz; 3 × 2.0 GHz		
SoC	GPU	Exynos: Xclipse 920; Snapdragon: Adreno 730	Adreno 740		
RAM		8 GB			8 or 12 GB
Storage	Capacity	128 or 256 GB	128, 256, or 512 GB	256 or 512 GB	256, 512 or 1024 GB
Storage	Expandable	No			
Connectivity	2G GSM/GPRS/EDGE	850, 900, 1800, 1900 MHz			
Connectivity	3G WCDMA/HSPA	850, 900, 1900, 2100 MHz			
Connectivity	4G LTE	1, 2, 3, 4, 5, 7, 8, 12, 13, 17, 20, 26, 28, 38, 40, 41, 66	1, 2, 3, 4, 5, 7, 8, 12, 13, 17, 18, 19, 20, 25, 26, 28, 32, 38, 39, 40, 41, 66		
Connectivity	5G	1, 2, 3, 5, 7, 8, 20, 28, 38, 40, 41, 66, 77, 78 SA/NSA/Sub6	1, 2, 3, 5, 7, 8, 12, 20, 25, 28, 38, 40, 41, 66, 75, 77, 78 SA/NSA/Sub6		
Connectivity	WiFi	802.11a/b/g/n/ac/6e, Hotspot, Dualband, Wi-Fi Direct			
Connectivity	Bluetooth	Bluetooth 5.3			
Connectivity	NFC	Yes			
USB port		USB-C	USB-C 3.2		
Rear Camera	Wide	50 MP			200 MP
Rear Camera	Telephoto	8 MP	10 MP		
Rear Camera	Ultrawide	12 MP			
Rear Camera	Periscope	—N/a			10 MP
Rear Camera	Video	8K@24fps, 4K@30/60fps, 1080p@30/60/120/240fps			
Front Camera	Camera	10 MP	12 MP		
Front Camera	Video	4K@30/60fps, 1080p@30/60fps			
Colors		Graphite; Cream; Purple; Mint; Indigo; Tangerine	Phantom Black; Cream; Green; Lavender; Graphite; Lime		Phantom Black; Cream; Green; Lavender; Graphite; Lime; Sky Blue; Red; BMW M Edition
Wireless charging (Qi)		Yes (native; fast charge supported)			
Battery	Capacity (mAh)	4500	3900	4700	5000
Battery	Replaceable	No			
Battery	Charging speeds	25 W		45 W	
Common sensors		Accelerometer, Gyroscope, Digital compass, Barometer, Front-facing proximity sensor, Brightness sensor			

== Galaxy S24 ==
Model		S24 FE SM-S721x	S24 SM-S921x	S24+ SM-S926x	S24 Ultra SM-S928x
Dates	Announced	26 September 2024	17 January 2024		
Dates	Released	3 October 2024	31 January 2024		
Dimensions mm (in)	Height	162 (6.4)	147 (5.8)	158.5 (6.24)	162.3 (6.39)
Dimensions mm (in)	Width	77.3 (3.04)	70.6 (2.78)	75.9 (2.99)	79 (3.1)
Dimensions mm (in)	Depth	8 (0.31)	7.6 (0.30)	7.7 (0.30)	8.6 (0.34)
Weight g (lb)		213 (0.470)	167 (0.368)	196 (0.432)	232 (0.511)
OS	Initial	One UI 6.1; Android 14			
OS	Latest	One UI 9.0; Android 17			
Display	Size	6.7 in (170 mm)	6.2 in (160 mm)	6.7 in (170 mm)	6.8 in (170 mm)
Display	Resolution	1080×2340		1440×3120	
Display	PPI	385	416	513	505
Display	Type	Dynamic AMOLED 2X			
SoC	Name	Samsung; Exynos 2400e	Samsung; Exynos 2400 Qualcomm; Snapdragon 8 Gen 3 for Galaxy (USA, Canada, China and Korea only)		Qualcomm; Snapdragon 8 Gen 3 for Galaxy
SoC	CPU	10-core 1 × 3.1 GHz; 2 × 2.9 GHz; 3 × 2.6 GHz; 4 × 1.95 GHz	Exynos: 10-core 1 × 3.2 GHz; 2 × 2.9 GHz; 3 × 2.6 GHz; 4 × 2.0 GHz Snapdragon: 8-core 1 × 3.4 GHz; 3 × 3.1 GHz; 2 × 2.9 GHz; 2 × 2.2 GHz		8-core 1 × 3.4 GHz; 3 × 3.1 GHz; 2 × 2.9 GHz; 2 × 2.2 GHz
SoC	GPU	Xclipse 940	Exynos: Xclipse 940; Snapdragon: Adreno 750		Adreno 750
RAM		8 GB		12 GB	
Storage	Capacity	128, 256, or 512 GB		256 or 512 GB	256, 512 or 1024 GB
Storage	Expandable	No			
Connectivity	2G GSM/GPRS/EDGE	850, 900, 1800, 1900 MHz			
Connectivity	3G WCDMA/HSPA	850, 900, 1900, 2100 MHz			
Connectivity	4G LTE	1, 2, 3, 4, 5, 7, 8, 12, 17, 18, 19, 20, 25, 26, 28, 32, 38, 40, 41, 66			
Connectivity	5G	1, 2, 3, 5, 7, 8, 12, 20, 25, 26, 28, 38, 40, 41, 66, 75, 77, 78 SA/NSA/Sub6			
Connectivity	WiFi	802.11a/b/g/n/ac/6e/7, Hotspot, Dualband, Wi-Fi Direct			
Connectivity	Bluetooth	Bluetooth 5.3			
Connectivity	NFC	Yes			
USB port		USB-C 3.2			
Rear Camera	Wide	50 MP			200 MP
Rear Camera	Telephoto	8 MP	10 MP		
Rear Camera	Ultrawide	12 MP			
Rear Camera	Periscope	—N/a			50 MP
Rear Camera	Video	8K@24/30fps, 4K@30/60fps, 1080p@30/60/120/240fps			
Front Camera	Camera	10 MP	12 MP		
Front Camera	Video	4K@30/60fps, 1080p@30/60fps			
Colors		Graphite; Grey; Yellow; Blue; Mint	Onyx Black; Marble Grey; Amber Yellow; Cobalt Violet; Jade Green; Sapphire Blue; Sandstone Orange		Titanium Black; Titanium Grey; Titanium Yellow; Titanium Violet; Titanium Green; Titanium Blue; Titanium Orange
Wireless charging (Qi)		Yes (native; fast charge supported)			
Battery	Capacity (mAh)	4700	4000	4900	5000
Battery	Replaceable	No			
Battery	Charging speeds	25 W		45 W	
Common sensors		Accelerometer, Gyroscope, Digital compass, Barometer, Front-facing proximity sensor, Brightness sensor			

== Galaxy S25 ==
Model		S25 FE SM-S731x	S25 SM-S931x	S25+ SM-S936x	S25 Edge SM-S937x	S25 Ultra SM-S938x
Dates	Announced	4 September 2025	22 January 2025		13 May 2025	22 January 2025
Dates	Released	19 September 2025	7 February 2025		30 May 2025	7 February 2025
Dimensions mm (in)	Height	161.3 (6.35)	146.9 (5.78)	158.4 (6.24)	158.2 (6.23)	162.8 (6.41)
Dimensions mm (in)	Width	76.6 (3.02)	70.5 (2.78)	75.8 (2.98)	75.6 (2.98)	77.6 (3.06)
Dimensions mm (in)	Depth	7.4 (0.29)	7.2 (0.28)	7.3 (0.29)	5.8 (0.23)	8.2 (0.32)
Weight g (lb)		190 (0.42)	162 (0.357)	190 (0.42)	163 (0.359)	218 (0.481)
OS	Initial	One UI 8 Android 16	One UI 7 Android 15			
OS	Latest	One UI 9.0; Android 17				
Display	Size	6.7 in (170 mm)	6.2 in (160 mm)	6.7 in (170 mm)		6.9 in (180 mm)
Display	Resolution	1080×2340		1440×3120		
Display	PPI	385	416	513		498
Display	Type	Dynamic AMOLED 2X				
SoC	Name	Exynos 2400	Qualcomm Snapdragon 8 Elite for Galaxy			
SoC	CPU	10-core 1x3.27 GHz; 2x2.9 GHz; 3x2.6 GHz; 4x1.95 GHz	8-core 2 × 4.47 GHz; 6 × 3.53 GHz			
SoC	GPU	Xclipse 940	Adreno 830			
RAM		8 GB	12 GB			12 or 16 GB
Storage	Capacity	128, 256, or 512 GB		256 or 512 GB		256, 512 or 1024 GB
Storage	Expandable	No				
Connectivity	2G GSM/GPRS/EDGE	850, 900, 1800, 1900 MHz				
Connectivity	3G WCDMA/HSPA	850, 900, 1900, 2100 MHz				
Connectivity	4G LTE	1, 2, 3, 4, 5, 7, 8, 12, 17, 18, 19, 20, 25, 26, 28, 32, 38, 40, 41, 66				
Connectivity	5G	1, 2, 3, 5, 7, 8, 12, 20, 25, 26, 28, 38, 40, 41, 66, 75, 77, 78 SA/NSA/Sub6				
Connectivity	WiFi	802.11a/b/g/n/ac/6e/7, Hotspot, Dualband, Wi-Fi Direct				
Connectivity	Bluetooth	Bluetooth 5.4				
Connectivity	NFC	Yes				
USB port		USB-C 3.2				
Rear Camera	Wide	50 MP			200 MP	
Rear Camera	Telephoto	8 MP	10 MP		—N/a	10 MP
Rear Camera	Ultrawide	12 MP				50 MP
Rear Camera	Periscope	—N/a				50 MP
Rear Camera	Video	8K@24/30fps, 4K@30/60/120fps, 1080p@30/60/120/240fps				
Front Camera	Camera	12 MP				
Front Camera	Video	4K@30/60fps, 1080p@30/60fps				
Colors		Icyblue; Jetblack; White	Icyblue; Mint; Navy; Silver Shadow; Pinkgold; Coralred; Blueblack		Titanium Icyblue; Titanium Silver; Titanium Jetblack	Titanium Silverblue; Titanium Black; Titanium Grey; Titanium Whitesilver; Titanium Jadegreen; Titanium Jetblack; Titanium Pinkgold
Wireless charging (Qi)		Yes (native; fast charge supported)				
Battery	Capacity (mAh)	4900	4000	4900	3900	5000
Battery	Replaceable	No				
Battery	Charging speeds	45 W	25 W	45 W	25 W	45 W
Common sensors		Accelerometer, Gyroscope, Digital compass, Barometer, Front-facing proximity sensor, Brightness sensor				

== Galaxy S26 ==
Model		S26 SM-S942x	S26+ SM-S947x	S26 Ultra SM-S948x
Dates	Announced	25 February 2026		
Dates	Released	6 March 2026		
Dimensions mm (in)	Height	149.6 (5.89)	158.4 (6.24)	162.8 (6.41)
Dimensions mm (in)	Width	71.7 (2.82)	75.8 (2.98)	78.1 (3.07)
Dimensions mm (in)	Depth	7.2 (0.28)	7.3 (0.29)	7.9 (0.31)
Weight g (lb)		167 (0.368)	190 (0.42)	214 (0.472)
OS	Initial	One UI 8.5; Android 16		
OS	Latest	One UI 9.0; Android 17		
Display	Size	6.3 in (160 mm)	6.7 in (170 mm)	6.9 in (180 mm)
Display	Resolution	1080×2340	1440×3120	
Display	PPI	411	513	498
Display	Type	Dynamic AMOLED 2X		
SoC	Name	Samsung; Exynos 2600 Qualcomm; Snapdragon 8 Elite Gen 5 (USA, Canada, China and Japan only)		Qualcomm Snapdragon 8 Elite Gen 5
SoC	CPU	Exynos: 10-core 1 × 3.8 GHz; 3 × 3.25 GHz; 6 × 2.75 GHz Snapdragon: 8-core 2 × 4.74 GHz; 6 × 3.62 GHz		8-core 2 × 4.74 GHz; 6 × 3.62 GHz
SoC	GPU	Exynos: Xclipse 960; Snapdragon: Adreno 840		Adreno 840
RAM		12 GB		12 or 16 GB
Storage	Capacity	256 or 512 GB		256, 512 or 1024 GB
Storage	Expandable	No		
Connectivity	2G GSM/GPRS/EDGE	850, 900, 1800, 1900 MHz		
Connectivity	3G WCDMA/HSPA	850, 900, 1900, 2100 MHz		
Connectivity	4G LTE	1, 2, 3, 4, 5, 7, 8, 12, 13, 17, 18, 19, 20, 25, 26, 28, 32, 38, 40, 41, 66		
Connectivity	5G	1, 2, 3, 5, 7, 8, 12, 20, 25, 26, 28, 38, 40, 41, 66, 75, 77, 78 SA/NSA/Sub6		
Connectivity	WiFi	802.11a/b/g/n/ac/6e/7, Hotspot, Dualband, Wi-Fi Direct		
Connectivity	Bluetooth	Bluetooth 5.4	Bluetooth 6.0	
Connectivity	NFC	Yes		
USB port		USB-C 3.2		
Rear Camera	Wide	50 MP		200 MP
Rear Camera	Telephoto	10 MP		
Rear Camera	Ultrawide	12 MP		50 MP
Rear Camera	Periscope	—N/a		50 MP
Rear Camera	Video	8K@24/30fps, 4K@30/60/120fps, 1080p@30/60/120/240fps		
Front Camera	Camera	12 MP		
Front Camera	Video	4K@30/60fps, 1080p@30/60fps		
Colors		Silver Shadow; Pink Gold; Cobalt Violet; Sky Blue; Black; White		
Wireless charging (Qi)		Yes (native; fast charge supported)		
Battery	Capacity (mAh)	4300	4900	5000
Battery	Replaceable	No		
Battery	Charging speeds	25 W	45 W	60 W
Common sensors		Accelerometer, Gyroscope, Digital compass, Barometer, Front-facing proximity sensor, Brightness sensor		

== See also ==
- Comparison of Samsung Galaxy Note smartphones
