= Samsung Galaxy S Duos =

Android smartphone by Samsung

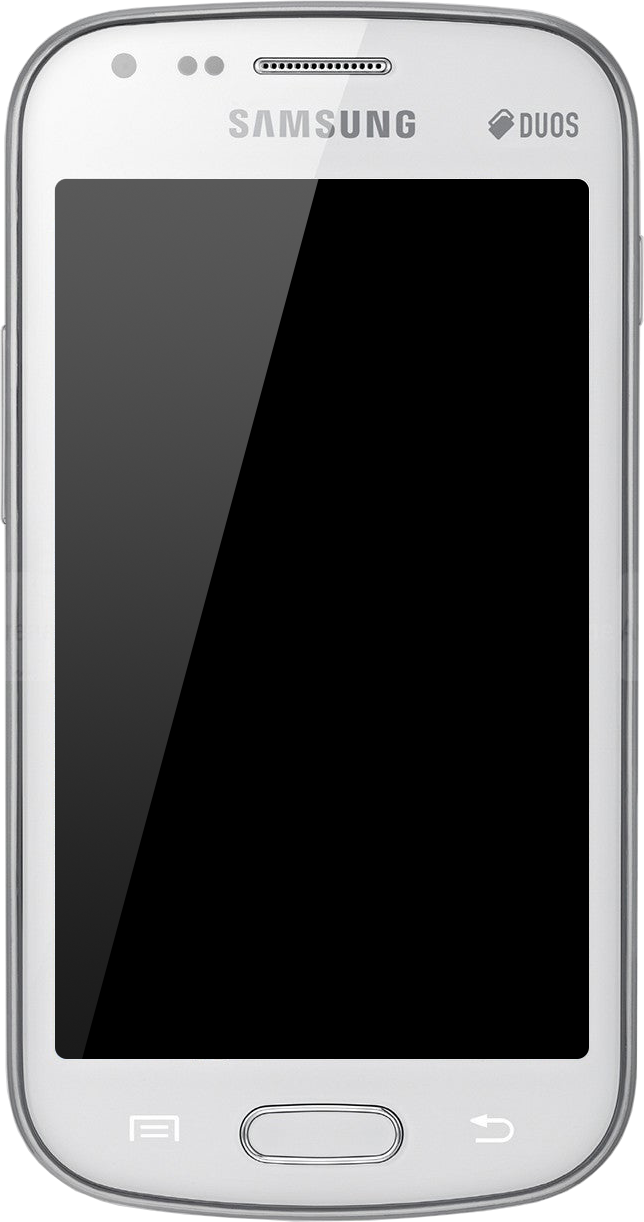
- Samsung Galaxy S Duos in White
- Manufacturer: Samsung
- Series: Galaxy S
- First released: September 2012; 14 years ago
- Availability by region: September 2012
- Successor: Samsung Galaxy S Duos 2
- Compatible networks: GSM/GPRS/EDGE; 850/900/1800/1900 MHz; UMTS/HSDPA (3.5G); 850/900/1900/2100 MHz up to 7.2 Mbps
- Form factor: Slate
- Dimensions: H: 121.5 mm (4.78 in); W: 63.1 mm (2.48 in); D: 10.5 mm (0.41 in)
- Weight: 120 g (4.2 oz)
- Operating system: Android 4.0.4 "Ice Cream Sandwich" With TouchWiz
- CPU: MSM7227 Cortex-A5 1 GHz
- GPU: Adreno 200
- Memory: 768 MB RAM
- Storage: 4 GB (1.8 GB usable)
- Removable storage: microSD up to 32 GB
- Battery: 1,500 mAh Lithium-Ion battery
- Rear camera: 5 Megapixels autofocus with LED flash
- Front camera: VGA
- Display: 480×800 pixels, 4 inches (~233 ppi pixel density) 16M color
- Connectivity: Wi-Fi 802.11 b/g/n Bluetooth 3.0 with A2DP; A-GPS; Micro USB 2.0; 3.5 mm TRRS audio jack FM radio with RDS support
- Data inputs: Capacitive touchscreen Push-buttons; Accelerometer; Digital compass
- SAR: Head: 0.18 W/kg 1 g Body: 0.45 W/kg 1 g Hotspot: 0.45 W/kg 1 g

Samsung Galaxy S Duos also known as GT-S7562 is a smartphone with dual SIM support designed and marketed by Samsung Electronics. In contrast with other dual sim Samsung models, this phone is a part of the high-end "S" series, this is why it is marketed as a part of the "''Galaxy S'' family.

The phone also comes with Android 4.0.4 Ice Cream Sandwich, along with Samsung's proprietary Touchwiz interface.

Unlike entry-level dual SIM models from Samsung, the Galaxy S Duos is active on both SIMs all the time so it is ready to receive calls on either SIM when a call is not already in progress. Optionally, it can receive two calls simultaneously, but this requires divert-on-busy to be set up on each number and is subject to availability from the carrier and may incur additional charges. A limitation of the Galaxy S Duos is that only one SIM can be active on UMTS (and therefore data) at a time and so it may be unsuitable for certain combinations of networks.

== Variants ==
=== China ===
China Unicom offers the Galaxy S Duos as the GT-S7562i, which is essentially the same phone as the international version, and a variant called the GT-S7562C which omits the proximity sensor.

Galaxy S Duos successors: S Duos 2 and S Duos 3

The S Duos 2 was released in December 2013 (announced the month before). It features an upgraded chipsets Broadcom BCM28145 an upgraded Android version 4.2 and upgraded video camera of 720p resolution at 30 frames per second. The S Duos 3 featured a better chipset, a newer Android version 4.4 (KitKat), and Bluetooth newer version with NFC

== Features ==
- HSDPA 7.2 (900/2100 MHz).
- Quad-band (850/900/1800/1900 MHz)
- Android 4.0.4 Ice Cream Sandwich.
- 100.8mm (4.0") WVGA TFT LCD.
- 5MP AF with Flash + VGA.
- 1 GHz One Processor
- Smart lock for safety.
- 3.5mm jack headphones.
- TouchWiz for Android
- GPS/GEO-tagging

== See also ==
- Comparison of Samsung Galaxy S smartphones
