= Samsung Galaxy S Duos 3 =

2014 dual SIM smartphone by Samsung Electronics

Samsung Galaxy S Duos 3 Samsung Galaxy S Duos 3 Value Edition
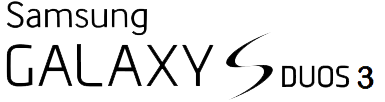

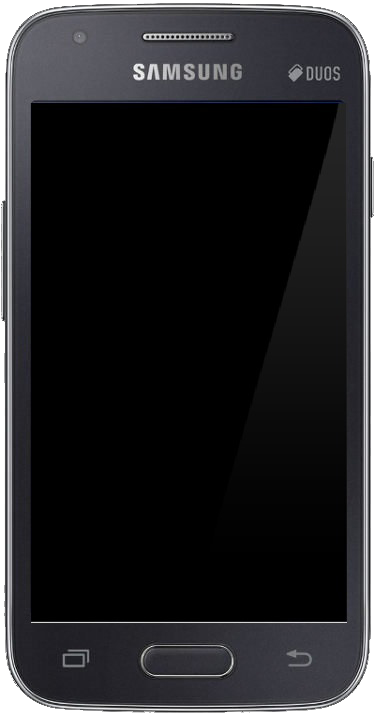
- Samsung Galaxy S Duos 3 In Black
- Brand: Samsung
- Manufacturer: Samsung Electronics
- Type: Touchscreen smartphone
- Series: Galaxy S
- Family: Samsung Galaxy
- First released: S Duos 3: August 5, 2014; 12 years ago S Duos 3 VE: February 2015; 11 years ago
- Predecessor: Samsung Galaxy S Duos 2
- Related: Samsung Galaxy Ace 4
- Compatible networks: GSM/GPRS/EDGE; 850/900/1800/1900 MHz; UMTS/HSPA (3.5G); 850/900/1900/2100 MHz up to 21/5.76 Mbps
- Form factor: Slate
- Dimensions: H: 121.5 mm (4.78 in); W: 63.1 mm (2.48 in); D: 10.6 mm (0.42 in)
- Weight: 118 g (4.2 oz)
- Operating system: Android 4.4.2 KitKat with TouchWiz Essence UX
- System-on-chip: Broadcom BCM21663
- CPU: 1.2 GHz dual core Cortex-A9
- GPU: Broadcom VideoCore IV HW
- Memory: 512 MB RAM
- Storage: 4 GB flash memory
- Removable storage: microSD up to 64 GB
- Battery: 1,500 mAh Lithium-Ion battery
- Rear camera: 5 Megapixel AF, LED flash, 720p video recording
- Front camera: 0.3 Megapixel
- Display: 4.0 in (10 cm) TFT LCD; 233 PPI 16M color
- Connectivity: Wi-Fi 802.11 b/g/n Bluetooth 4.0 with A2DP; A-GPS; Micro USB 2.0; 3.5 mm TRRS audio jack FM radio with RDS support
- Data inputs: Capacitive touchscreen Push-buttons; Accelerometer; Digital compass
- Development status: discontinued
- SAR: 0.27 W/kg (head); 0.65 W/kg (body)

Samsung Galaxy S Duos 3 is an Android-based smartphone with dual SIM support manufactured, produced and marketed by Samsung Electronics, which serves as an immediate successor to the Galaxy S Duos 2 of 2013, as part of the Galaxy S series. It was announced in August 2014 and was made available on the same month, while its Value Edition model was announced in February 2015.

In contrast with other dual SIM Samsung models, this phone is a part of the high-end "S" series, this is why it is marketed as a part of the "Galaxy S" family. Despite being called as a direct successor to the original S Duos 2 phone, external and physical design of the model is identical to the original model, except for the menu button which is now replaced by the recent apps button and also placing emphasis on internal upgrades such as upgraded processor and an updated Android operating system. It remains available in many Asian countries.

== Specifications ==
=== Design ===
The design of the S Duos 3 is the same as the design of the S Duos and the S Duos 2. It has a bit less rounded shape with chrome finish edges, the same polycarbonate chassis, faux metal trim and a removable rear cover, with a premium texture finish. The S Duos 3 is available in Black, and White frost color finishes.

=== Hardware ===
The S Duos 3 has a 1.0 GHz dual-core processor alongside the 512 MB RAM and 4 GB internal storage (only 2.1 GB is user accessible). It has a 5 megapixel rear camera assisted with LED flash and a 0.3 megapixel (VGA) front-facing camera. The rear camera has 7 shooting modes and can record video in 720p.

The S Duos 3 has a 4.0-inch (100.8 mm) WVGA TFT LCD with 480x800 pixels resolution and 233 ppi pixel density, which is the same as that of the S Duos 2, but does not allow for automatic brightness and gamut adjustments due to lacking an ambient sensor unlike its predecessor. It lacks a proximity sensor.

The S Duos 3 also contains a 1500 mAh Li-Ion removable battery. It lasts 4–5 hours of heavy usage and just over 3 hours of gaming.

Unlike entry-level dual SIM models from Samsung, the S Duos 3 is active on both SIMs all the time similar to the S Duos 2; so it is ready to receive calls on either SIM when a call is not already in progress. Optionally, it can receive two calls simultaneously, but this requires divert-on-not-reachable to be set up on each number and is subject to availability from the carrier and may incur additional charges. A limitation of the phone is that only one SIM can be active on UMTS (and therefore data) at a time and so it may be unsuitable for certain combinations of networks.

=== Software ===
The S Duos 3 ships with Android 4.4.2 KitKat and Samsung's updated TouchWiz Essence UX user interface. The S Duos 3 adds some of the features of the Galaxy S4 such as Samsung proprietary widgets used by models bearing the same version of the OS. Custom ROMs such as AOSP 5.1 and CyanogenMod 12.1 by itigr, are available for updating to Android 5.1.1 Lollipop.

== See also ==
- Samsung Electronics
- Samsung Galaxy
- Samsung Galaxy S series
- Comparison of Samsung Galaxy S smartphones

Preceded by Samsung Galaxy S Duos 2	Samsung Galaxy S Duos 3; 2014	Succeeded by
