= Samsung Galaxy S series =

Flagship & high-end series of smartphones

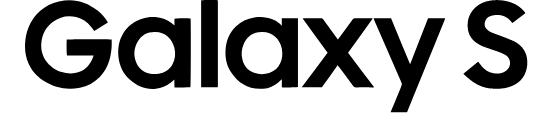
- Galaxy S logo since 2015, without the Samsung word

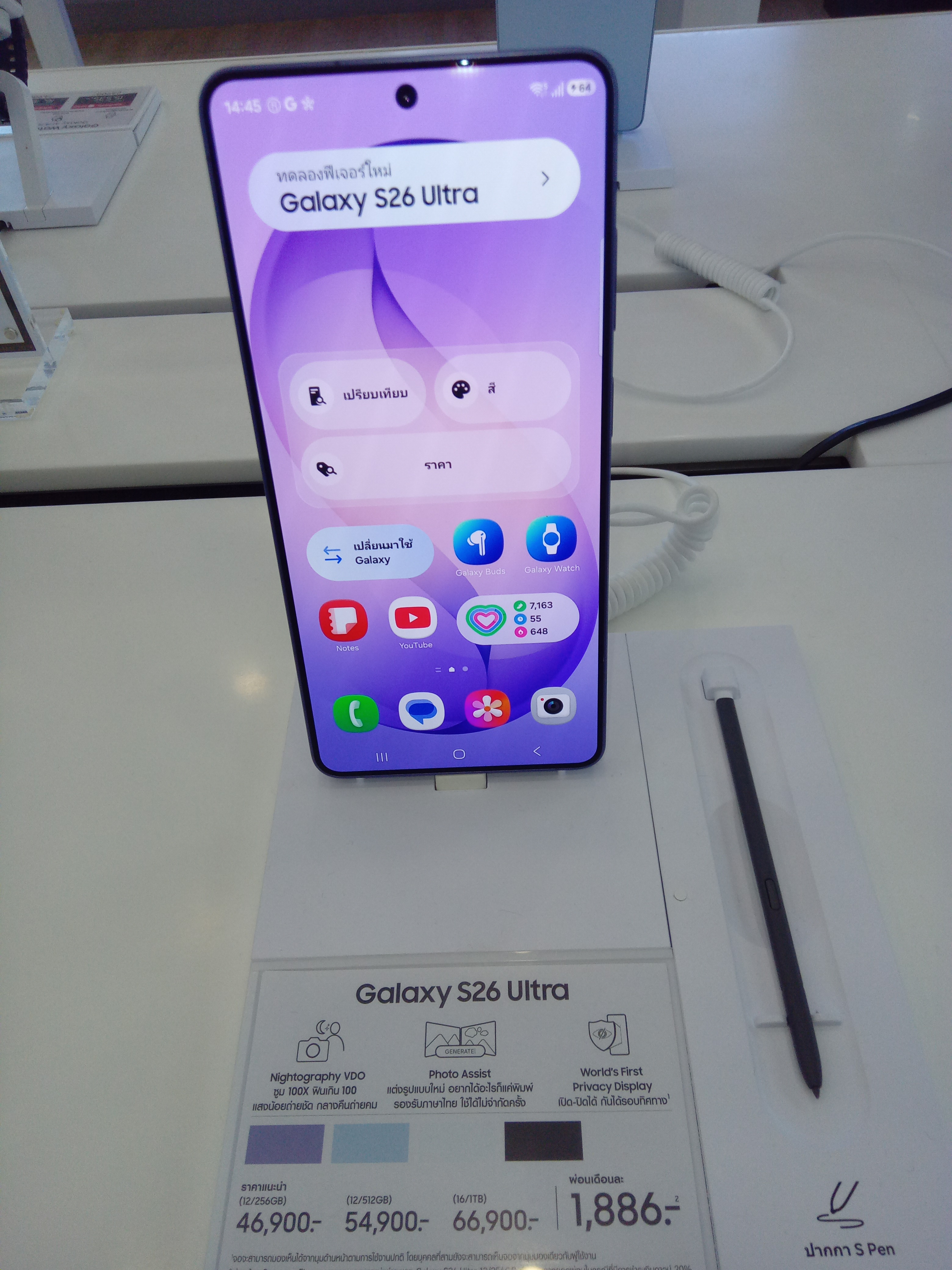
- Samsung Galaxy S26 Ultra, the most recent flagship model
- Developer: Samsung Electronics
- Product family: Samsung Galaxy
- Type: Smartphones
- Released: June 4, 2010; 16 years ago
- Operating system: Android
- System on a chip: Global: Samsung Exynos (2010−present); North America and East Asia: Qualcomm Snapdragon (2011−present)
- Input: Touchscreen; Stylus ("Ultra" models only since Galaxy S22)
- Predecessor: Samsung Ultra Edition (2006–2009); Samsung Galaxy Note (2011–2020)
- Related: Samsung Galaxy Tab; Samsung Galaxy Note; Samsung Galaxy Tab S series Samsung Galaxy A series Samsung Galaxy Z series Samsung Galaxy Watch series

The Samsung Galaxy S series is a flagship line of Android-based smartphones manufactured, developed, produced and marketed by Samsung Electronics. It serves as Samsung's high-end line of its wider Galaxy family of Android devices, and, in conjunction with the Galaxy Z series, it also serves as its flagship smartphone and tablet lineup (for the Galaxy Tab S series), positioned and slotted above the entry-level & mid-range Galaxy A series since 2019, and below the historical Galaxy Note series until 2020.

Initially only a base model at its launch in 2010, Samsung began introducing the S Pen and its dedicated slot only for its "Ultra" models in the Galaxy S line of series in 2022 (since the Galaxy S22). Since the release of the Galaxy S24 series in early 2024, software support for all Galaxy S series phones now matches those of the Google Pixel lineup.

Galaxy S series release timeline
2010	Samsung Galaxy S
2010	Samsung Galaxy S Hoppin
2011	Samsung Galaxy SL
2011	Samsung Galaxy S II
2011	Samsung Galaxy S Plus
2011	Samsung Galaxy S Blaze 4G
2012	Samsung Galaxy S III
2012	Samsung Galaxy S Duos
2012	Samsung Galaxy S Relay 4G
2012	Samsung Galaxy S III Mini
2013	Samsung Galaxy S II Plus
2013	Samsung Galaxy S4
2013	Samsung Galaxy S4 Mini
2013	Samsung Galaxy S4 Active
2013	Samsung Galaxy S4 Zoom
2013	Samsung Galaxy S Duos 2
2014	Samsung Galaxy S4 Value Edition
2014	Samsung Galaxy S5
2014	Samsung Galaxy S III Neo
2014	Samsung Galaxy K Zoom
2014	Samsung Galaxy S5 Active
2014	Samsung Galaxy S5 Sport
2014	Samsung Galaxy S5 Mini
2014	Samsung Galaxy S5 Plus
2014	Samsung Galaxy S III Mini Value Edition
2014	Samsung Galaxy S Duos 3
2015	Samsung Galaxy S Duos 3 Value Edition
2015	Samsung Galaxy S6 / S6 Edge
2015	Samsung Galaxy S6 Active
2015	Samsung Galaxy S4 Mini Value Edition
2015	Samsung Galaxy S5 Neo
2015	Samsung Galaxy S6 Edge+
2016	Samsung Galaxy S7 / S7 Edge
2016	Samsung Galaxy S7 Active
2017	Samsung Galaxy S8 / S8+
2017	Samsung Galaxy S8 Active
2018	Samsung Galaxy S9 / S9+
2018	Samsung Galaxy S9 Tactical Edition
2018	Samsung Galaxy S Light Luxury
2019	Samsung Galaxy S10e / S10 / S10+ / S10 5G
2020	Samsung Galaxy S10 Lite
2020	Samsung Galaxy S20 / S20+ / S20 Ultra
2020	Samsung Galaxy S20 5G UW
2020	Samsung Galaxy S20 Tactical Edition
2020	Samsung Galaxy S20 FE
2021	Samsung Galaxy S21 / S21+ / S21 Ultra
2022	Samsung Galaxy S21 FE
2022	Samsung Galaxy S22 / S22+ / S22 Ultra
2022	Samsung Galaxy S20 FE 2022
2023	Samsung Galaxy S23 / S23+ / S23 Ultra
2023	Samsung Galaxy S23 Tactical Edition
2023	Samsung Galaxy S23 FE
2024	Samsung Galaxy S24 / S24+ / S24 Ultra
2024	Samsung Galaxy S24 FE
2025	Samsung Galaxy S25 / S25+ / S25 Ultra
2025	Samsung Galaxy S25 Edge
2025	Samsung Galaxy S25 FE
2026	Samsung Galaxy S26 / S26+ / S26 Ultra
2026	Samsung Galaxy S26 FE
2027	Samsung Galaxy S27 / S27+ / S27 Pro / S27 Ultra

== Timeline ==
Galaxy S logo in 2019

Legend:	Unsupported	Supported	Current and supported	Upcoming

Model	Announced	Released		Discontinued	Supported		Lifespan
Model	Announced	Date	With OS	Discontinued	Ended	Final OS	Lifespan
Galaxy S	23 March 2010	4 June 2010	2.1 Eclair	6 March 2012	10 January 2012	2.3.6 Gingerbread	1 year, 7 months
Galaxy S II	13 February 2011	2 May 2011	2.3.4 Gingerbread		9 April 2013	4.1.2 Jelly Bean	1 year, 11 months
Galaxy S III	3 May 2012; 4 September 2012 (LTE)	29 May 2012; 3 October 2012 (LTE)	4.0.4 Ice Cream Sandwich; 4.1.1 Jelly Bean (LTE); 4.3 Jelly Bean (Neo)		15 March 2014; 9 December 2014 (LTE)	4.3 Jelly Bean; 4.4.4 KitKat (LTE & Neo)	1 year, 10 months 2 years, 2 months (LTE)
Galaxy S4	14 March 2013	27 April 2013	4.2.2 Jelly Bean		11 April 2017	5.0.1 Lollipop	3 years, 11 months
Galaxy S5	24 February 2014	11 April 2014	4.4.2 KitKat; 5.1.1 Lollipop (S5 Neo)		9 April 2019	6.0.1 Marshmallow; 7.0 Nougat (S5 Neo)	4 years, 11 months
Galaxy S6	1 March 2015	10 April 2015	5.0.2 Lollipop; 5.1.1 Lollipop (S6 Edge+)	11 February 2016	12 February 2019	7.0 Nougat	3 years, 10 months
Galaxy S7	11 February 2016	11 March 2016	6.0.1 Marshmallow	21 April 2017	14 April 2020	8.0 Oreo	4 years, 1 month
Galaxy S8	29 March 2017	21 April 2017	7.0 Nougat	11 March 2018	11 May 2021	9.0 Pie	4 years
Galaxy S9	25 February 2018	11 March 2018	8.0 Oreo	20 February 2019	12 April 2022	10	4 years, 1 month
Galaxy S10	20 February 2019	4 March 2019	9.0 Pie; 10 (Lite)	6 March 2020	12 March 2024	12; 13 (Lite)	5 years
Galaxy S20	11 February 2020	6 March 2020	10; 12 (FE 2022)	29 January 2021	8 April 2025; 11 November 2025 (FE)	13	5 years
Galaxy S21	14 January 2021	29 January 2021	11; 12 (FE)	25 February 2022	4 February 2026; Expected Q1 2027 (FE)	15; 16 (FE)	Expected 5 years
Galaxy S22	9 February 2022	25 February 2022	12	17 February 2023	Expected Q2 2027	16	Expected 5 years
Galaxy S23	1 February 2023	17 February 2023	13	31 January 2024	Expected Q4 2028	17	Expected 5 years
Galaxy S24	17 January 2024	31 January 2024	14	7 February 2025	Expected Q4 2031	TBA	Expected 7 years
Galaxy S25	22 January 2025	7 February 2025	15; 16 (FE)	11 March 2026	Expected Q4 2032	TBA	Expected 7 years
Galaxy S26	25 February 2026	11 March 2026	16; 17 (FE)	TBA	Expected Q4 2033	TBA	Expected 7 years

== Lineup ==
=== Samsung Galaxy S ===
Original Galaxy S logo

The Samsung Galaxy S from 2010

The original Galaxy S smartphone was announced in March 2010 and released on 4 June 2010.

		Galaxy S
Display		4.0" Super AMOLED (480x800px)
Processor		Samsung Exynos 3110 (S5PC110)
Storage		8–16 GB (expandable up to 32 GB using microSD card)
RAM		512 MB
Battery		1500 mAh (user-replaceable)
Camera	Rear	5 megapixels, 720p (HD) video
Camera	Front	0.3 megapixels
Others		Touch sensors for navigation keys; no dedicated camera shutter button

=== Samsung Galaxy S II ===
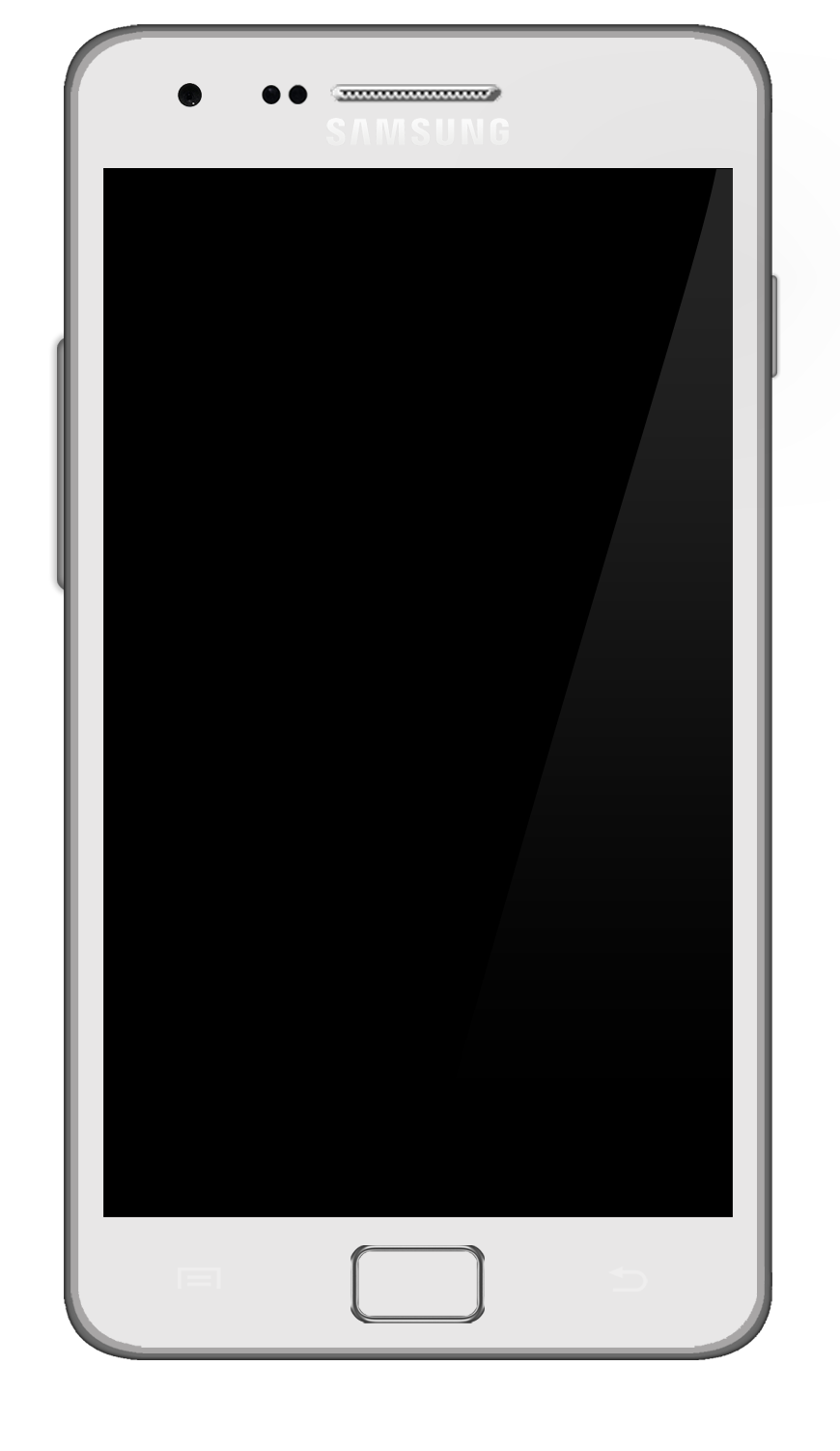
The Samsung Galaxy S2 from 2011

The company announced the Samsung Galaxy S II on 13 February 2011. In 2013, a "Plus" variant was released with only 8 GB of internal storage and slightly different chipset. It also features the TouchWiz "Nature UX" user interface, and the brushed dark blue colour variant ("Pebble Blue"), both known from the Galaxy S III.

		Galaxy S II
Display		4.3" or 4.5" Super AMOLED (480x800px)
Processor		Samsung Exynos 4 Dual; Texas Instruments OMAP4430; Qualcomm Snapdragon S3 APQ8060
Storage		16/32 GB (expandable up to 32 GB using microSD card)
RAM		1 GB
Battery		1650 or 1800 mAh (user-replaceable)
Camera	Rear	8 Megapixels, 1080p (Full HD) video
Camera	Front	2 megapixels
Others		USB On-The-Go (OTG), Mobile High-definition Link (MHL) to HDMI

=== Samsung Galaxy S III ===
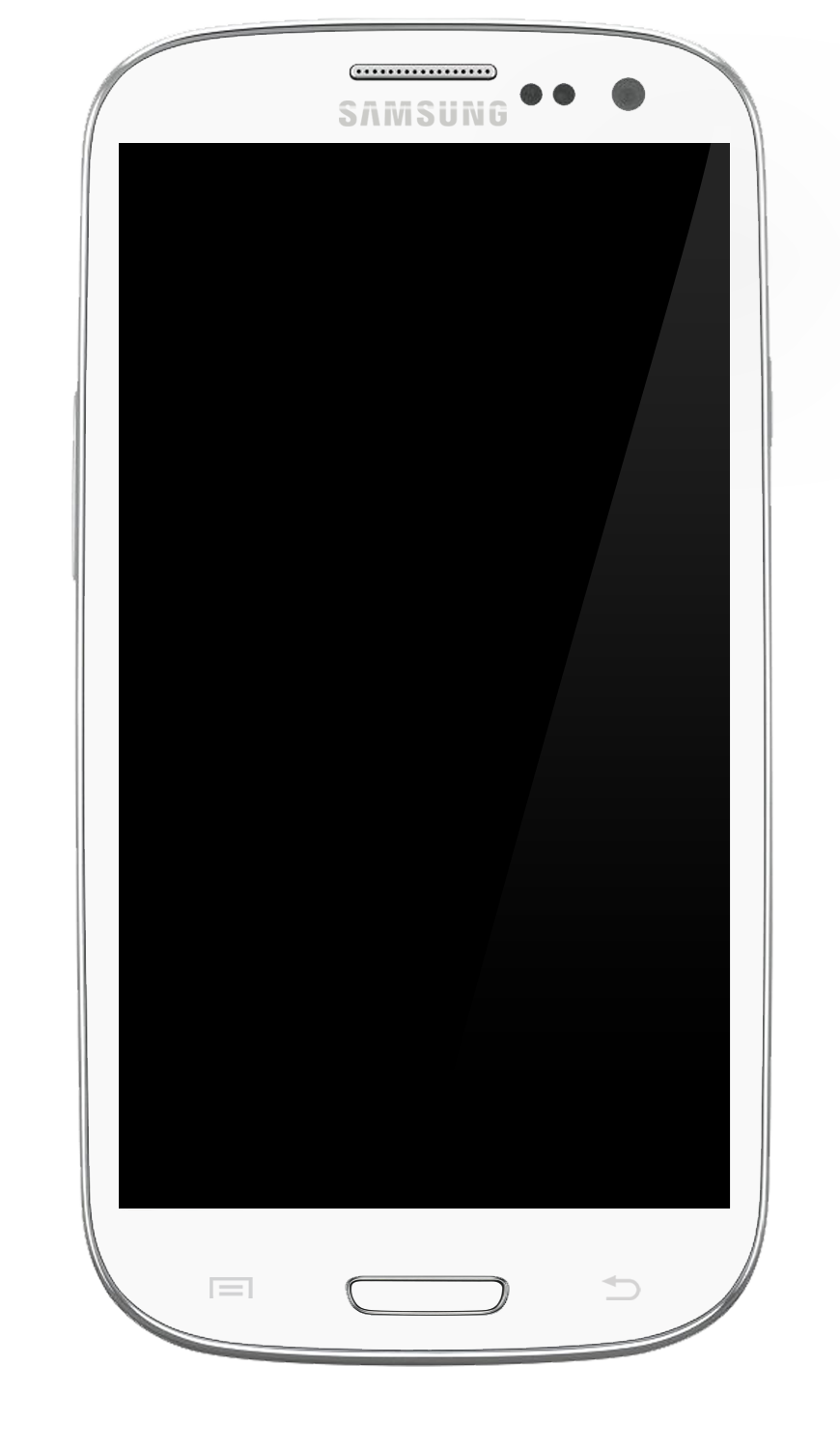
The Samsung Galaxy S III from 2012

The Samsung Galaxy S III was announced on 3 May 2012, and also became one of the most sold S series phone. Key features introduced on the device include split-screen multitasking, video player with pop-up window, "Ambient Light" setting that adjusts screen brightness, and a "Smart Stay" feature that keeps the screen on when looking at the phone. It was also the first Samsung phone with wireless charging support that can be enabled using a special back cover that connects to dedicated pins under the rear cover.

		Galaxy S III
Display		4.8" Super AMOLED (720x1280px)
Processor		Samsung Exynos 4 Quad; Qualcomm Snapdragon S4 MSM8960; Qualcomm Snapdragon 400 MSM8228
Storage		16/32/64 GB (expandable using microSD card)
RAM		1 GB (S3 GT-I9300); 1.5 GB (S3 Neo GT-I9301); 2 GB (S3 LTE GT-I9305)
Battery		2100 mAh (user-replaceable)
Camera	Rear	8 megapixels, 1080p (Full HD) video at 30 fps
Camera	Front	1.9 megapixels 720p (HD) video at 30 fps
Others		FM radio receiver (GT-I9300 only)

=== Samsung Galaxy S4 ===
The Samsung Galaxy S4 from 2013

The Samsung Galaxy S4 was announced by Samsung on 14 March 2013. More than 80 million units of the Galaxy S4 were sold, making it one of the best selling S series phones. Some of the highlighted features mostly include the Air Gestures (using the device's proximity and light sensors) and an IR blaster. The Galaxy S4 is one of only two Samsung mobile phones to be equipped with thermometer and hygrometer sensors (the other being the Galaxy Note 3). Some praised the innovation inherent in all of the Galaxy S4's new features, while others criticized it as feature creep.

Other variants of the device are the rugged and water-resistant S4 Active, the lower-priced mid-class S4 Mini, as well as the hybrid S4 Zoom, which is equipped with an optical zoom lens with 10× magnification, more powerful Xenon flash, tripod mount, and rotary knob lens ring, combining a mobile phone with a dedicated digital camera.

		Galaxy S4
Display		5" Super AMOLED (1920x1080px)
Processor		Samsung Exynos 5 Octa 5410; Qualcomm Snapdragon 600
Storage		16/32/64 GB (expandable using microSD card)
RAM		2 GB
Battery		2100 mAh (user-replaceable)
Camera	Rear	13 megapixels, 3840x2160p (4K UHD) video at 30 fps
Camera	Front	2.1 megapixels, 1080p (Full HD) video at 30 fps

=== Samsung Galaxy S5 ===
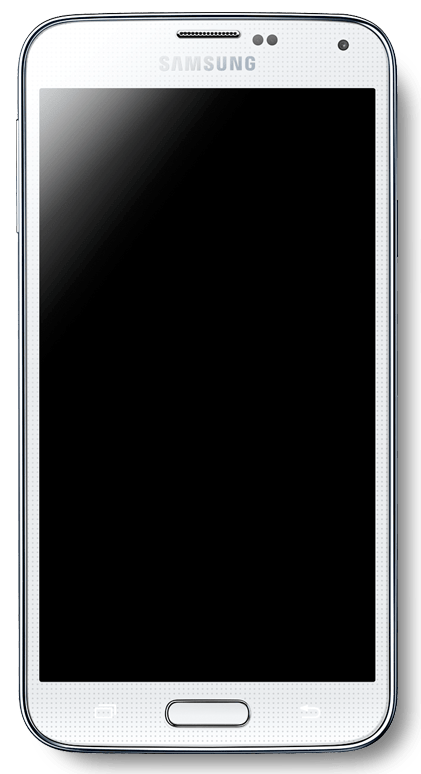
The Samsung Galaxy S5 from 2014

The Samsung Galaxy S5 was announced on 24 February 2014, offering improvements over its predecessor including a heart rate monitor, IP67 water resistance, a fingerprint scanner, 4K video recording, phase-detection autofocus plus enhanced low-light photography, a "Download Booster" feature, and USB 3.0. It lacks the thermometer (temperature) sensor, hygrometer (humidity) sensor, and "Story Album" features from the preceding Galaxy S4, but largely inherited Air View and gesture-related functionality. "Quick glance" was replaced with "Air wake-up", which allows waking up the smartphone from stand-by mode by hovering over the proximity sensor.

The Galaxy S5 is the first Samsung mobile phone where the touch key on the left side of the home button is a task key instead of an option key. It also the last mobile phone in the Galaxy S series with a micro-SIM card (later phones use a nano-SIM card) and a user-replaceable battery.

Since the Galaxy S5, the model number (e.g. SM-G900F) is no longer displayed on the boot screen.

		Galaxy S5
Display		5.1" Super AMOLED (1920x1080px)
Processor		Samsung Exynos 5 Octa 5422; Qualcomm Snapdragon 801; Qualcomm Snapdragon 805
Storage		16/32 GB (expandable using microSD card)
RAM		2 / 3 GB
Battery		2800 mAh (user-replaceable)
Camera	Rear	16 megapixels, 3840x2160p (4K UHD) video at 30 fps
Camera	Front	2 megapixels, 1080p (Full HD) at 30 fps

=== Samsung Galaxy S6 ===
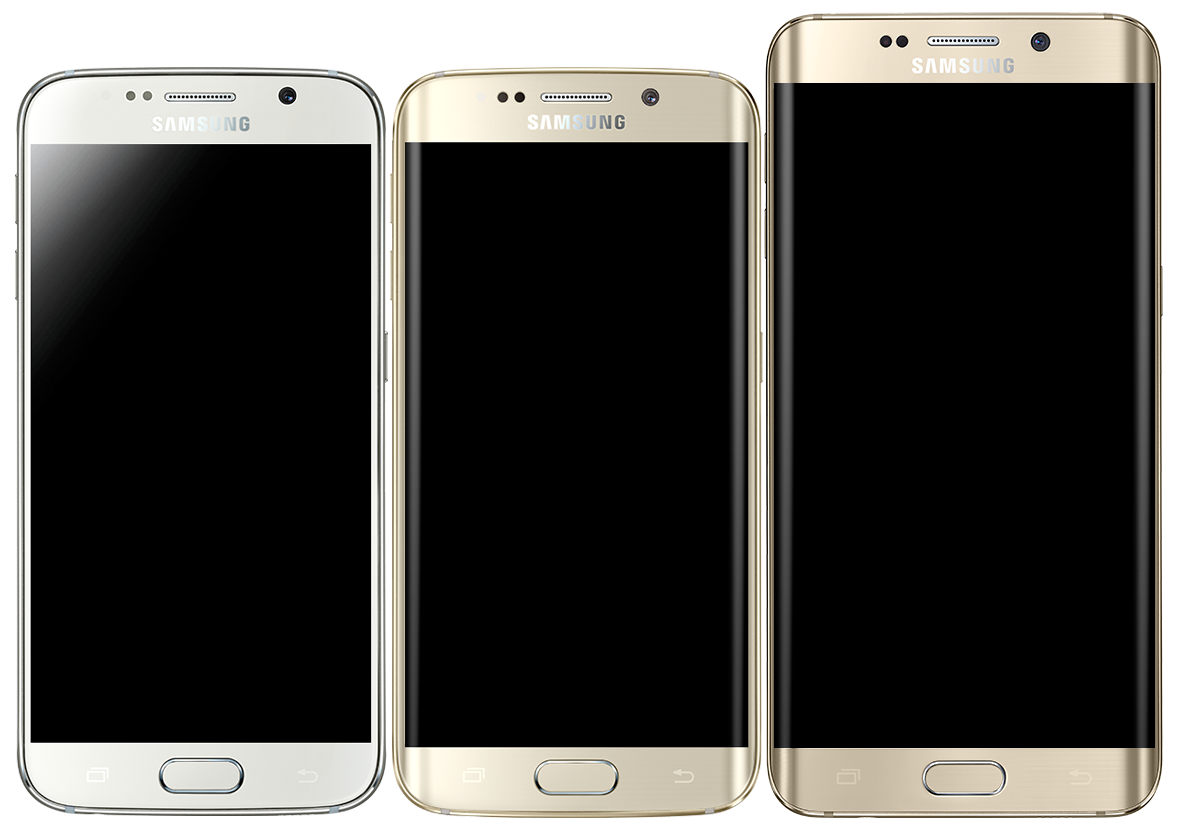
The Samsung Galaxy S6 series from 2015

The Samsung Galaxy S6 series was first announced on 1 March 2015 with the release of the Galaxy S6 and S6 edge. It marks a counter-utilitarian and fashion-oriented course in the Galaxy S series as it debuted with a new metal and glass build. The Galaxy S6 series improves upon its predecessors by adding the ability to quickly charge the phone with up to 15W using Qualcomm's Quick Charge 2.0, virtual reality (compatible with the Galaxy Gear VR), a "Smart Manager" feature, and the ability to customize the interface with themes. There were also other variants that were released under the S6 series, which includes the Galaxy S6 Active (first released on 12 June 2015), and the Galaxy S6 edge+ (first released on 13 August 2015, along with the Galaxy Note5).

The phone marked its several firsts within the series. It introduced features such as OIS, quick launch to open Camera, and a Slow Motion Video Mode. But it is also the first device to remove the microSD card slot, Mobile High-Definition Link (MHL) support, water protection, Air Gestures, and USB 3.0 support. In addition, the batteries in the Galaxy S6 and Galaxy S6 edge are smaller than the battery in the Galaxy S5, and are not replaceable by end users.

Justin Denison, then vice president of product strategy at Samsung, stated on stage at the Unpacked 2015 Episode 1 keynote event that they had opted for a built-in battery now that "consumers could feel confident in charging their phones". The previous year, a Samsung commercial for the Galaxy S5 had mocked the iPhones' non-replaceable batteries, referring to iPhone users as "wall huggers", citing their incessant dependence on wall charging.

		Galaxy S6	Galaxy S6 edge	Galaxy S6 edge+
Display		5.1" Super AMOLED (1440x2560px)		5.7" Super AMOLED (1440x2560px)
Processor		Samsung Exynos 7 Octa 7420		
Storage		32/64/128 GB (non-expandable)		32/64 GB (non-expandable)
RAM		3 GB		4 GB
Battery		2550 mAh	2600 mAh	3500 mAh
Camera	Rear	16 megapixels, 3840x2160p (4K UHD) video at 30 fps		
Camera	Front	5 megapixels, 1440p (QHD) at 30 fps		
Others		nano-SIM card slot		

=== Samsung Galaxy S7 ===
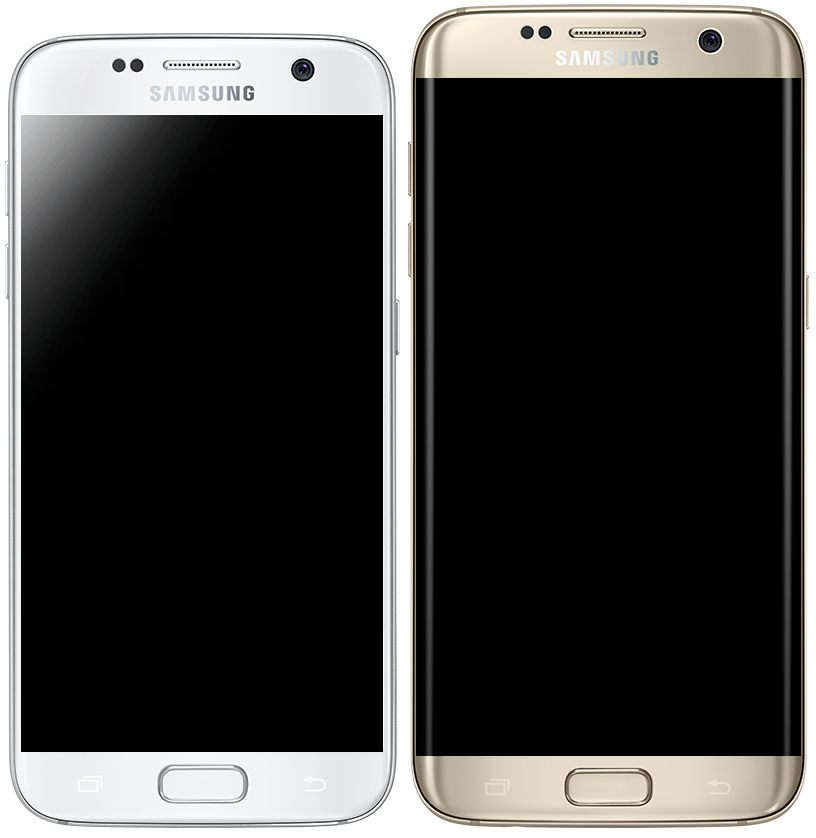
The Samsung Galaxy S7 and S7 Edge from 2016

The Samsung Galaxy S7 series was first announced on 21 February 2016, with the release of the Galaxy S7 and Galaxy S7 edge. It introduced new features such as adding an always-on display feature, "Dual Pixel" camera feature for faster autofocus, and improved low-light photography. Water resistance (IP68) and a microSD card reader were returned, both of which had been present on the Galaxy S5, but neither present on the Galaxy S6. However, the IR blaster was removed from the Galaxy S7. Another variant under this lineup, the Galaxy S7 active, was released on 6 June 2016.

		Galaxy S7	Galaxy S7 edge
Display		5.1" Super AMOLED (1440x2560px)	5.5" Super AMOLED (1440x2560px)
Processor		Samsung Exynos 8890; Qualcomm Snapdragon 820	
Storage		32/64/128 GB (expandable)	
RAM		4 GB	
Battery		3000 mAh	3600 mAh
Camera	Rear	12 megapixels, 3840x2160p (4K UHD) video at 30 fps 1080p (Full HD) at 30/60 fps Slow-motion 720p (HD) at 240 fps	
Camera	Front	5 megapixels, 1440p (QHD) at 30 fps	

=== Samsung Galaxy S8 ===
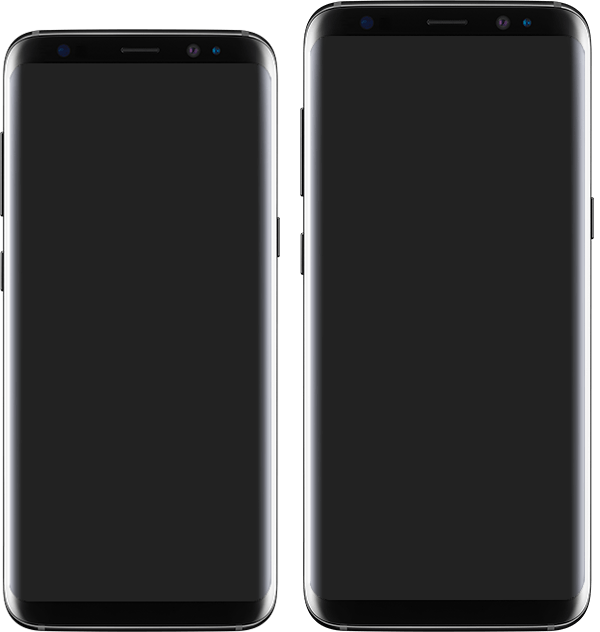
The Samsung Galaxy S8 and S8+ from 2017

Samsung announced the Samsung Galaxy S8 series smartphones on 27 March 2017. They feature an iris scanner, which would be the first of the two S series devices to feature this. S Voice has also been replaced by Bixby. In addition, the microUSB port has been replaced by a USB-C 3.0 port, and the physical home button and capacitive buttons have been replaced by on-screen keys. All previous Galaxy S series smartphones featured a 16:9 aspect ratio which was replaced on the Galaxy S8 (18.5:9) for the first time. A new feature called Samsung DeX was added, allowing the phone to get a desktop user interface when plugged in a monitor. Another variant under this line-up, the Galaxy S8 active, was released on 7 November 2017.

		Galaxy S8	Galaxy S8+
Display		5.8" Super AMOLED (1440x2960px)	6.2" Super AMOLED (1440x2960px)
Processor		Samsung Exynos 8895; Qualcomm Snapdragon 835	
Storage		64 GB (expandable)	64/128 GB (expandable)
RAM		4 GB	4/6 GB
Battery		3000 mAh	3500 mAh
Camera	Rear	12 megapixels, 3840x2160p (4K UHD) video at 30 fps 1080p (Full HD) at 30/60 fps Slow-motion 720p (HD) at 240 fps	
Camera	Front	8 megapixels, 1440p (QHD) at 30 fps	

=== Samsung Galaxy S9 ===
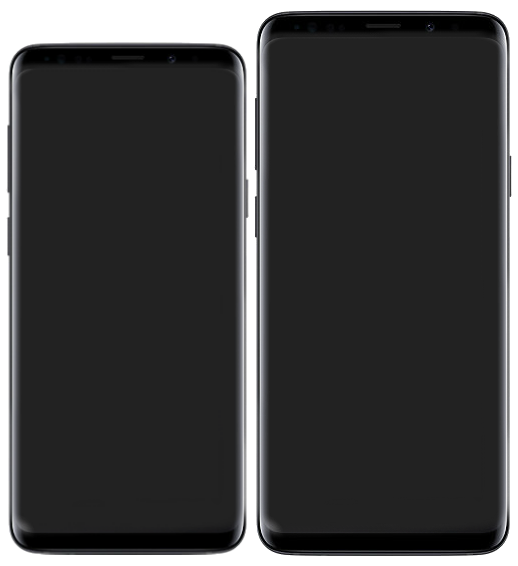
The Samsung Galaxy S9 and S9+ from 2018

The Samsung Galaxy S9 series were unveiled on 25 February 2018 at the Mobile World Congress, with an improved camera, redesigned back panel and improved internals. The fingerprint scanner on the back is relocated to below the rear-facing camera, and the earpiece becomes an additional speaker for stereo sound. It is the first flagship phone by Samsung to support recording 2160p (4K) at 60 frames per second (twice as much as the preceding Galaxy S5 to S8), 1080p@240 frames per second (four times as much as the S5 to S8) and super slow motion at 960 frames per second for a limited duration. The first two frame rates are the first increase in the series since the 2014 Samsung Galaxy S5.

Its camera has a variable aperture which can switch between f/1.5 and f/2.4, making it the first mobile phone since the 2009 Nokia N86 with a variable aperture camera (excluding hybrid camera phones such as the Samsung Galaxy S4 Zoom and K Zoom). A subsequent software update retrofitted the feature of warning the user about flaws in photographs such as blinking eyes and blur, which was first implemented on the Galaxy Note 9.

		Galaxy S9	Galaxy S9+
Display		5.8" Super AMOLED (1440x2960px)	6.2" Super AMOLED (1440x2960px)
Processor		Samsung Exynos 9810; Qualcomm Snapdragon 845	
Storage		64/128/256 GB (expandable)	64/128/256 GB (expandable)
RAM		4 GB	6 GB
Battery		3000 mAh	3500 mAh
Camera	Rear	12 megapixels, 3840×2160p (4K UHD) video at 30/60 fps 1080p (FHD) at 30/60 fps Slow-motion: 1080p@204 fps or 720p@240 fps	Main: 12 megapixels Telephoto: 12 megapixels Video: 3840×2160p (4K UHD) video at 30 fps 1080p (Full HD) at 30/60 fps Slow-motion 720p (HD) at 240 fps
Camera	Front	8 megapixels, 1440p (QHD) at 30 fps	8 megapixels, 1440p (QHD) at 30 fps

=== Samsung Galaxy S10 ===
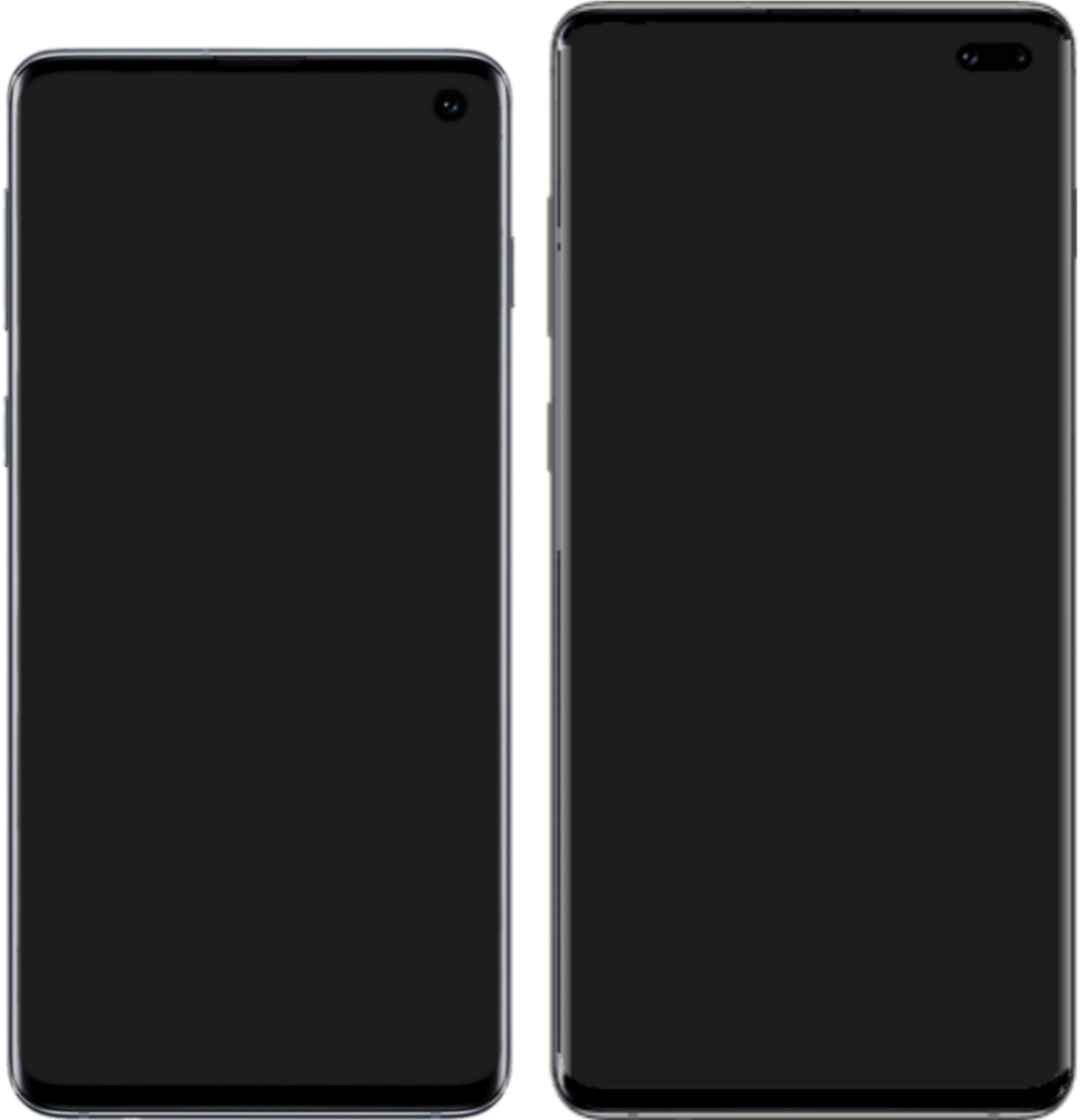
The Samsung Galaxy S10 and S10+ from 2019

Samsung announced the Galaxy S10 series on 20 February 2019 to commemorate the 10th Anniversary of the S Series line-up. It introduced many new features such as an ultrasonic in-display fingerprint scanner, ultra wide lens, reverse wireless charging, 5G and Samsung's first hole-punch front camera design. The main rear camera features a dual aperture lens. Samsung added HDR video recording in the HDR10 Plus format.

The Galaxy S10 series debuted the One UI software for the first time with Android 9 Pie. The aspect ratio was changed again on the Galaxy S10 series from the Galaxy S8 series, which now features a 19:9 display. For the first time since the Galaxy S5, the series reverts back to using plastic for the back panel which would also later be seen on the A series and the base Galaxy Note that same year. The only exceptions are the Plus models and the S10 5G which still have a glass back panel. The charging rates above 15W supported by the S10 5G and S10 Lite are the first increase on Samsung flagship smartphones since the 2014 Samsung Galaxy Note 4.

In January 2020, the Galaxy S10 Lite was released, a mid-range variant of the S10 containing the same cameras and performance but with lower features, taller display and a redesigned rear camera setup which ditches the center positioning used since the Galaxy S II in 2011.

			Galaxy S10e	Galaxy S10	Galaxy S10+	Galaxy S10 5G	Galaxy S10 Lite 5G
Display			5.8" Dynamic AMOLED (2280x1080px)	6.1" Dynamic AMOLED (3040x1440px)	6.4" Dynamic AMOLED (3040x1440px)	6.7" Dynamic AMOLED (3040x1440px)	6.7" Super AMOLED (2400x1080px)
Processor			Samsung Exynos 9820; Qualcomm Snapdragon 855				Qualcomm Snapdragon 855
Storage			128/256 GB (expandable)	128/512 GB (expandable)	128 / 512 GB / 1 TB (expandable)	256 / 512 GB (non-expandable)	128 GB (expandable)
RAM			6/8 GB	8 GB	8/12 GB	8 GB	6/8 GB
Battery			3100 mAh	3400 mAh	4100 mAh	4500 mAh	4500 mAh
Camera	Rear	Main	12 megapixels				48 megapixels
Camera	Rear	Ultrawide	16 megapixels				12 megapixels
Camera	Rear	Telephoto	—N/a	12 megapixels			—N/a
Camera	Rear	Macro	—N/a				5 megapixels
Camera	Rear	Video	3840x2160p (4K UHD) video at 30/60 fps 1080p (Full HD) at 30/60 fps Slow-motion at 1080p@240fps or 720p@960 fps				3840x2160p (4K UHD) video at 30/60 fps, 1080p (Full HD) at 30/60 fps or slow-motion 1080p@240 fps
Camera	Front		10 megapixels 3840x2160p (4K UHD) at 30/60 fps 1080p (Full HD) at 30 fps		10 megapixels, 8 megapixels 3840x2160p (4K UHD) at 30/60 fps 1080p (Full HD) at 30 fps	10 megapixels, 8 megapixels, ToF (time-of-flight); 3840x2160p (4K UHD) at 30/60 fps 1080p (Full HD) at 30 fps	32 megapixels 1080p (Full HD) at 30 fps
Others			Side-mounted Fingerprint Sensor; Reverse Wireless Charging (Qi-certified); WiFi 6	Ultrasonic (In-Display) Fingerprint Sensor; Reverse Wireless Charging (Qi-certified); WiFi 6		ToF sensor Ultrasonic (In-Display) Fingerprint Sensor; Reverse Wireless Charging (Qi-certified); WiFi 6	Optical (In-Display) Fingerprint Sensor; WiFi 6

=== Samsung Galaxy S20 ===
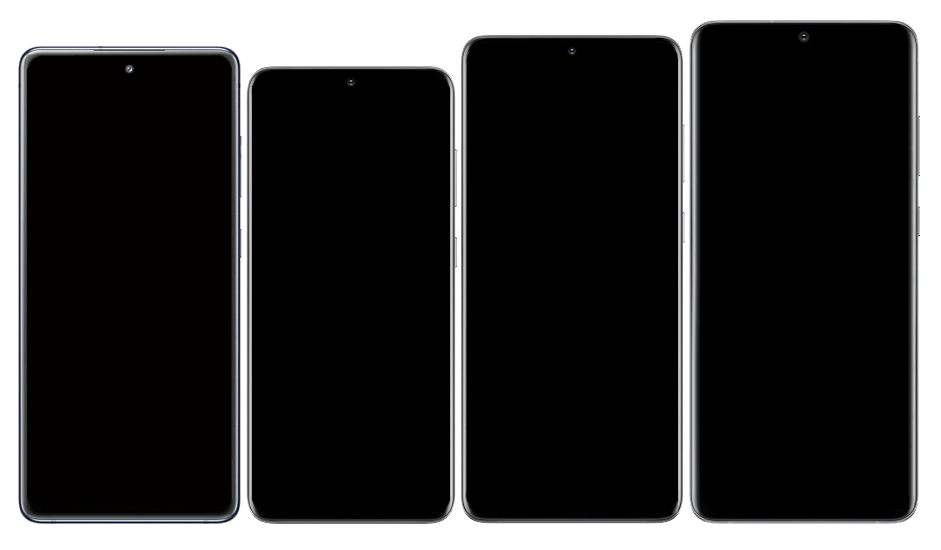
The Samsung Galaxy S20 series from 2020

Samsung announced the Galaxy S20 series on 11 February 2020. On 23 September 2020, the Galaxy S20 FE was released, a mid-range variant of the S20 containing similar cameras and performance but with less functionality. Another variant is the Galaxy S20 Tactical Edition, intended for military use. The Galaxy S20 series featured 120 Hz refresh rate displays with 20:9 aspect ratio.

The S20 series are the first Samsung mobile phones with 8K video recording (7680×4320p), excluding the S20 FE. Samsung abandoned the variable aperture lens on the rear camera after two generations. For the first time on the series, all models are not equipped with a 3.5mm audio connector (colloquially "headphone jack"). Its predecessor, the Galaxy S10 series, removed the headphone jack on the 5G and Lite variants, but kept it on the S10e, base S10 and S10+. On an earlier keynote, Samsung mocked the lack thereof of the Apple iPhone 7 on stage. This is also the first S series to use plastic on all models, unlike its predecessor which kept the glass back panel for the Plus and 5G models.

			Galaxy S20	Galaxy S20+	Galaxy S20 Ultra	Galaxy S20 FE
Display			6.2" Dynamic AMOLED 2X 120 Hz (3200x1440px)	6.7" Dynamic AMOLED 2X 120 Hz (3200x1440px)	6.9" Dynamic AMOLED 2X 120 Hz (3200x1440px)	6.5" Super AMOLED 120 Hz (2400x1080px)
Processor			Samsung Exynos 990; Qualcomm Snapdragon 865			
Storage			128 GB (expandable)	128/256/512 GB (expandable)		128/256 GB (expandable)
RAM			8/12 GB		12/16 GB	6/8 GB
Battery			4000 mAh	4500 mAh	5000 mAh	4500 mAh
Camera	Rear	Main	12 megapixels		108 megapixels	12 megapixels
Camera	Rear	Ultrawide	12 megapixels			
Camera	Rear	Telephoto	64 megapixels		48 megapixels	8 megapixels
Camera	Rear	Video	7680x4320 (8K) at 24 fps 3840x2160p (4K UHD) video at 30/60 fps 1080p (Full HD) at 30/60 fps Slow-motion at 1080p@240fps or 720p@960 fps			3840x2160p (4K UHD) video at 30/60 fps 1080p (Full HD) at 30/60 fps Slow-motion at 1080p@240fps or 720p@960 fps
Camera	Front		10 megapixels 3840x2160p (4K UHD) at 30/60 fps 1080p (Full HD) at 30 fps		40 megapixels 3840x2160p (4K UHD) at 30/60 fps 1080p (Full HD) at 30 fps	32 megapixels 3840x2160p (4K UHD) at 30/60 fps 1080p (Full HD) at 30 fps
Others			Ultrasonic (In-Display) Fingerprint Sensor; Reverse Wireless Charging (Qi-certified); USB 3.2; 25W Super Fast Charging	ToF sensor Ultrasonic (In-Display) Fingerprint Sensor; Reverse Wireless Charging (Qi-certified); USB 3.2; 25W Super Fast Charging	ToF sensor Ultrasonic (In-Display) Fingerprint Sensor; Reverse Wireless Charging (Qi-certified); USB 3.2; 45W Super Fast Charging	Optical (In-Display) Fingerprint Sensor; Reverse Wireless Charging (Qi-certified); USB 3.2; 25W Super Fast Charging

=== Samsung Galaxy S21 ===
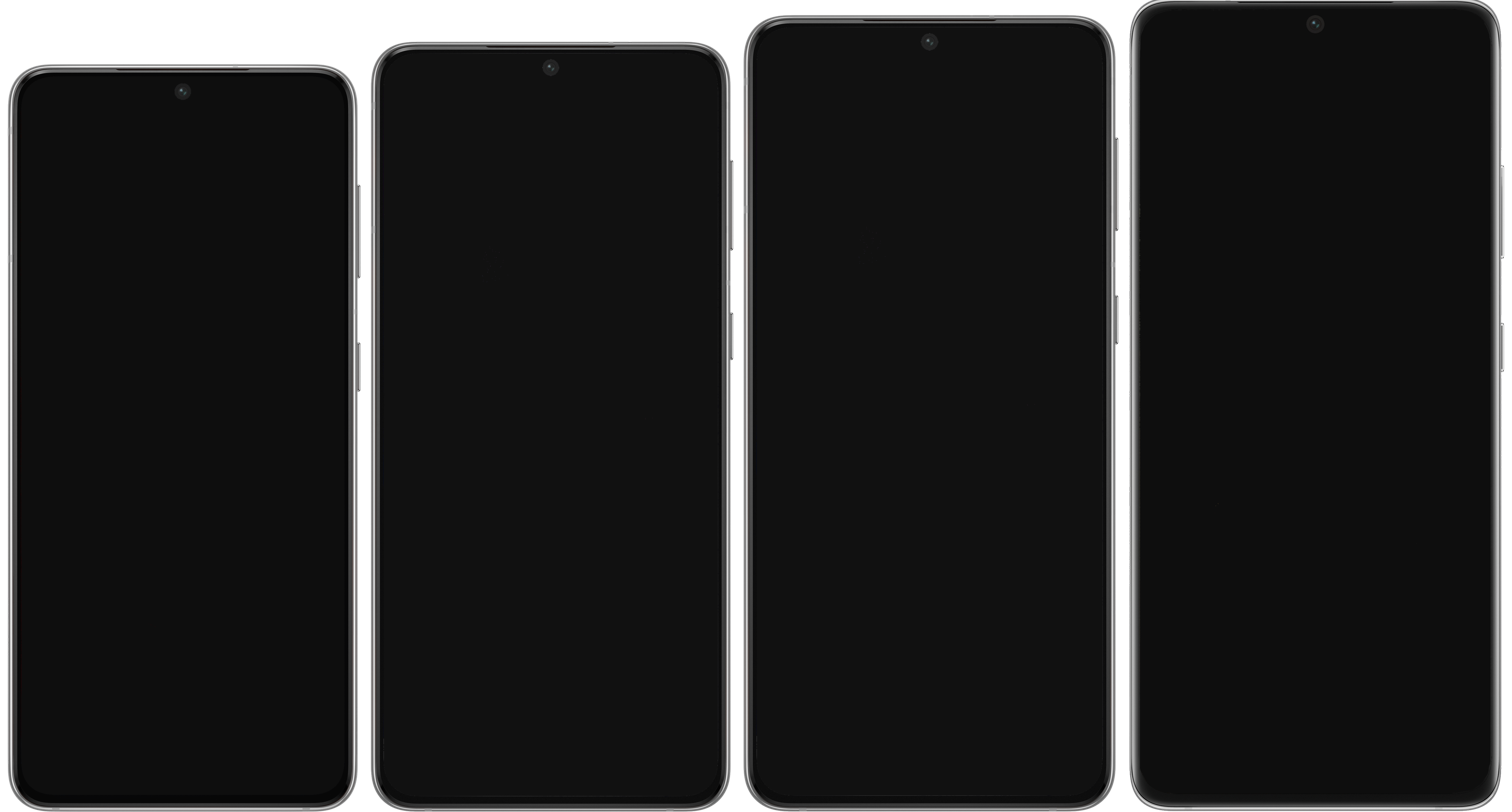
The Samsung Galaxy S21 series from 2021

Samsung announced the Galaxy S21 series on 14 January 2021. They are the first S series lineup to feature 5G models only during launch. On 4 January 2022, the Galaxy S21 FE was released, a mid-range variant of the S21 containing similar cameras and performance but with lower features.

These smartphones lack the microSD expandable storage previously included on nearly every Galaxy S series except the Galaxy S6 series, the Galaxy S10 5G, and the Galaxy S20 5G UW. As with their predecessor, the Galaxy S21 series also lacks a headphone jack.

This was the first S-series phone to get support for the "S-Pen" stylus on the S21 Ultra, which was an exclusive feature for the Note series, though the S21 Ultra lacks the Note's compartment to house the stylus inside the unit. The series also feature an adaptive refresh rate that could go from 10–120 Hz. The S21 series also drops MST technology previously used for Samsung Pay which gave Galaxy phones the ability to pay without needing NFC.

			Galaxy S21	Galaxy S21+	Galaxy S21 Ultra	Galaxy S21 FE
Display			6.2" Dynamic AMOLED 2X 48-120hz (adaptive) (2400x1080px)	6.7" Dynamic AMOLED 2X 48-120hz (adaptive) (2400x1080px)	6.8" Dynamic AMOLED 2X 10-120hz (adaptive) (3200x1440px)	6.4" Dynamic AMOLED 2X 60/120 Hz (2340x1080px)
Processor			Samsung Exynos 2100; Qualcomm Snapdragon 888			
Storage			128/256 GB (non-expandable)		128/256/512 GB (non-expandable)	128/256 GB (non-expandable)
RAM			8 GB		12/16 GB	6/8 GB
Battery			4000 mAh	4800 mAh	5000 mAh	4500 mAh
Camera	Rear	Main	12 megapixels		108 megapixels	12 megapixels
Camera	Rear	Ultrawide	12 megapixels			
Camera	Rear	Telephoto	64 megapixels		3x: 10 megapixels 10x: 10 megapixels	8 megapixels
Camera	Rear	Video	7680x4320 (8K) at 24 fps 3840x2160p (4K UHD) video at 30/60 fps 1080p (Full HD) at 30/60 fps Slow-motion at 1080p@240fps or 720p@960 fps			3840x2160p (4K UHD) video at 30/60 fps 1080p (Full HD) at 30/60 fps Slow-motion at 1080p@240fps or 720p@960 fps
Camera	Front		10 megapixels 3840x2160p (4K UHD) at 30/60 fps 1080p (Full HD) at 30 fps		40 megapixels 3840x2160p (4K UHD) at 30/60 fps 1080p (Full HD) at 30 fps	32 megapixels 3840x2160p (4K UHD) at 30/60 fps 1080p (Full HD) at 30 fps
Others			Ultrasonic (In-Display) Fingerprint Sensor; Reverse Wireless Charging (Qi-certified); USB 3.2; 25W Super Fast Charging		Laser AutoFocus; Ultrasonic (In-Display) Fingerprint Sensor; Reverse Wireless Charging (Qi-certified); USB 3.2; 25W Super Fast Charging	Optical (In-Display) Fingerprint Sensor; Reverse Wireless Charging (Qi-certified); USB 3.2; 25W Super Fast Charging

=== Samsung Galaxy S22 ===
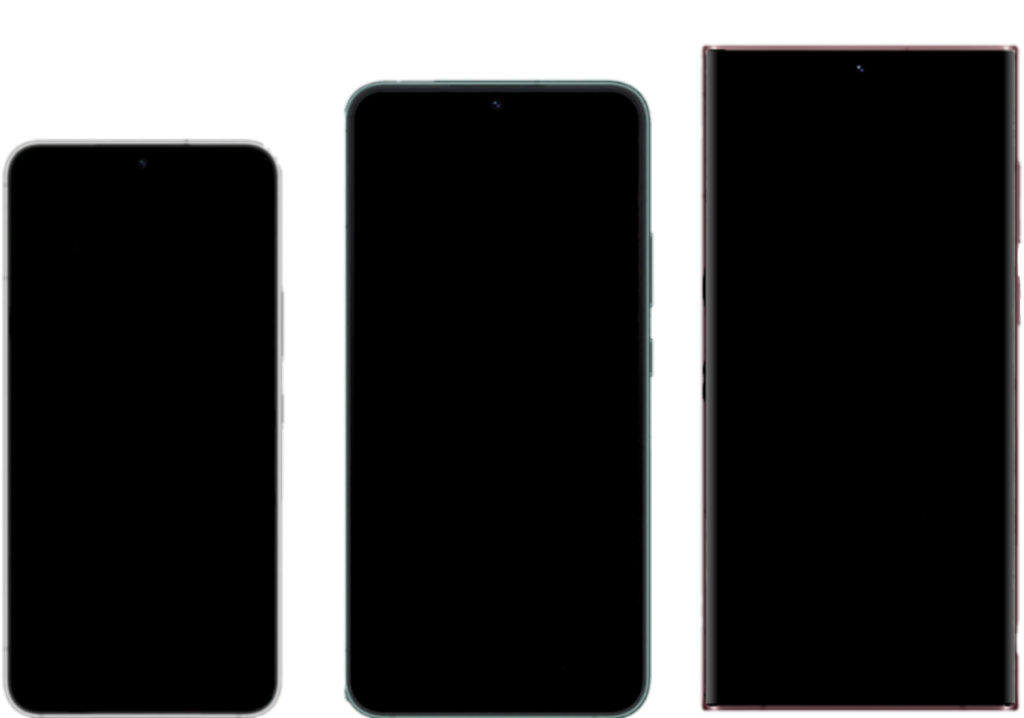
The Samsung Galaxy S22 series from 2022

Samsung announced the Galaxy S22 series on 9 February 2022. This is the only Galaxy S series lineup (from S20 onwards) to not have a FE version, while its successors have an FE variant (albeit released later than the main devices).

The Galaxy S22 series changed the aspect ratio once again to 19.5:9. The series added glass backs which was lacking on the S10-S21 series, the frames were also flattened similar to the iPhone 12 series. The Galaxy S22 Ultra had a huge design change which gave it a more similar look to the Galaxy Note20 Ultra rather than the Galaxy S21 Ultra and it saw the introduction of the built in S Pen which was not present on the Galaxy S21 Ultra. The S22 Ultra also upgraded the adaptiveness of the refresh rate from 10–120 Hz to 1–120 Hz.

Both the S22+ and S22 Ultra got upgrades in the charging speed from 25W to 45W. The S22+ and S22 Ultra also got improvements on the display brightness to 1750 nits. Armor Aluminum and Gorilla Glass Victus+ also saw an introduction to the S22 series.

			Galaxy S22	Galaxy S22+	Galaxy S22 Ultra
Display			6.1" Dynamic AMOLED 2X 48-120hz (adaptive) (2340×1080px)	6.6" Dynamic AMOLED 2X 48-120hz (adaptive) (2340×1080px)	6.8" Dynamic AMOLED 2X 1-120hz (adaptive) (3088×1440px)
Processor			Samsung Exynos 2200; Qualcomm Snapdragon 8 Gen 1		
Storage			128/256 GB (non-expandable)		128/256/512 GB/1 TB (non-expandable)
RAM			8 GB		8/12 GB
Battery			3700 mAh	4500 mAh	5000 mAh
Camera	Rear	Main	50 megapixels		108 megapixels
Camera	Rear	Ultrawide	12 megapixels		
Camera	Rear	Telephoto	10 megapixels		3x: 10 megapixels 10x: 10 megapixels
Camera	Rear	Video	7680x4320 (8K) at 24 fps 3840x2160p (4K UHD) video at 30/60 fps 1080p (Full HD) at 30/60 fps Slow-motion at 1080p@240fps or 720p@960 fps		
Camera	Front		10 megapixels 3840x2160p (4K UHD) at 30/60 fps 1080p (Full HD) at 30 fps		40 megapixels 3840x2160p (4K UHD) at 30/60 fps 1080p (Full HD) at 30 fps
Others			Ultrasonic (In-Display) Fingerprint Sensor; Reverse Wireless Charging (Qi-certified); USB 3.2; 25W Super Fast Charging	Ultrasonic (In-Display) Fingerprint Sensor; Reverse Wireless Charging (Qi-certified); USB 3.2; 45W Super Fast Charging	Laser AutoFocus; Ultrasonic (In-Display) Fingerprint Sensor; Reverse Wireless Charging (Qi-certified); USB 3.2; 45W Super Fast Charging

=== Samsung Galaxy S23 ===
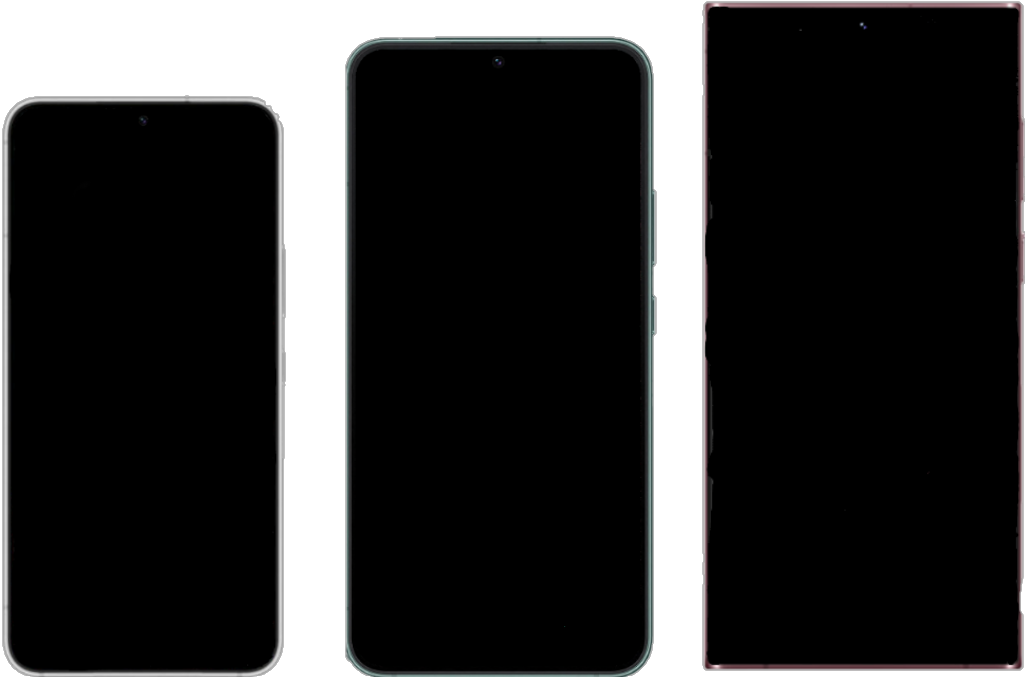
The Samsung Galaxy S23 series from 2023

Samsung announced the Galaxy S23 series on 1 February 2023. In 4 October 2023, the Galaxy S23 FE was released, a mid-range variant of the S23 containing similar cameras and performance but with less functionality. The first three devices would only be equipped with a Qualcomm Snapdragon chipset (on all variants sold globally), a first for the series (all of its predecessors would either have a Samsung Exynos chipset or a Qualcomm Snapdragon chipset, which varies by country).

Like its predecessor, the Galaxy S23 series share the same lineup and screen sizes. The new Galaxy S23 models are equipped with a Dynamic AMOLED 2X display featuring HDR10+ support, dynamic tone mapping technology, and a peak brightness of 1750 nits. The S23 supports USB-C wired charging at up to 25W using USB Power Delivery, while the S23+ and S23 Ultra offer faster 45W charging. All three models feature Qi inductive charging up to 15W and Wireless PowerShare, which enables the phones to charge other Qi-compatible devices from their own batteries at up to 4.5W. The phones are launched with Android 13 and Samsung's One UI 5.1 software.

			Galaxy S23	Galaxy S23+	Galaxy S23 Ultra	Galaxy S23 FE
Display			6.1" Dynamic AMOLED 2X 48-120hz (adaptive) (2340x1080px)	6.6" Dynamic AMOLED 2X 48-120hz (adaptive) (2340x1080px)	6.8" Dynamic AMOLED 2X 1-120hz (adaptive) (3088×1440px)	6.4" Dynamic AMOLED 2X 60-120hz (adaptive) (3088×1440px)
Processor			Qualcomm Snapdragon 8 Gen 2			Samsung Exynos 2200; Qualcomm Snapdragon 8 Gen 1
Storage			128/256/512 GB (non-expandable)		256/512 GB/1 TB (non-expandable)	128/256 GB (non-expandable)
RAM			8 GB		8/12 GB	8 GB
Battery			3900 mAh	4700 mAh	5000 mAh	4500 mAh
Camera	Rear	Main	50 megapixels		200 megapixels	50 megapixels
Camera	Rear	Ultrawide	12 megapixels			
Camera	Rear	Telephoto	10 megapixels		3x: 10 megapixels 10x Periscope: 10 megapixels	8 megapixels
Camera	Rear	Video	7680x4320 (8K) at 24 fps 3840x2160p (4K UHD) video at 30/60 fps 1080p (Full HD) at 30/60 fps Slow-motion at 1080p@240fps or 720p@960 fps			
Camera	Front		12 megapixels 3840x2160p (4K UHD) at 30/60 fps 1080p (Full HD) at 30 fps			10 megapixels 3840x2160p (4K UHD) at 30/60 fps 1080p (Full HD) at 30 fps
Others			Ultrasonic (In-Display) Fingerprint Sensor; Reverse Wireless Charging (Qi-certified); USB 3.2; 25W Super Fast Charging	Ultrasonic (In-Display) Fingerprint Sensor; Reverse Wireless Charging (Qi-certified); USB 3.2; 45W Super Fast Charging		Optical (In-Display) Fingerprint Sensor; Reverse Wireless Charging (Qi-certified); USB 3.2; 25W Super Fast Charging

=== Samsung Galaxy S24 ===
Samsung announced the Galaxy S24 series on 17 January 2024. The Samsung Galaxy S24 FE was announced on 26 September 2024.

The Galaxy S24 series are the first Samsung devices alongside the Galaxy Z6 series, Galaxy Tab S10 and Galaxy Tab A11 series in which it will get up to 7 years of OS and security updates. This would mean software updates would end within 2031.

Starting with the Galaxy S24 series, 32-bit ARMv7 applications are no longer supported due to restrictions in the processor. This applies to both Exynos and Snapdragon versions.

			Galaxy S24	Galaxy S24+	Galaxy S24 Ultra	Galaxy S24 FE
Display			6.2" Dynamic AMOLED 2X 1–120 Hz (adaptive) (2340×1080px)	6.7" Dynamic AMOLED 2X 1-120hz (adaptive) (3120×1440px)	6.8" Dynamic AMOLED 2X 1-120hz (adaptive) (3120×1440px)	6.7" Dynamic AMOLED 2X 60-120hz (adaptive) (2340×1080px)
Processor			Samsung Exynos 2400; Qualcomm Snapdragon 8 Gen 3		Qualcomm Snapdragon 8 Gen 3	Samsung Exynos 2400e
Storage			128/256/512 GB (non-expandable)	256/512 GB (non-expandable)	256/512 GB/1 TB (non-expandable)	128/256/512 GB (non-expandable)
RAM			8/12 GB	12 GB		8 GB
Battery			4000 mAh	4900 mAh	5000 mAh	4700 mAh
Camera	Rear	Main	50 megapixels		200 megapixels	50 megapixels
Camera	Rear	Ultrawide	12 megapixels			
Camera	Rear	Telephoto	10 megapixels		3x: 10 megapixels 10x Periscope: 50 megapixels 10x: 10 megapixels	8 megapixels
Camera	Rear	Video	7680x4320 (8K) at 24/30 fps 3840x2160p (4K UHD) video at 30/60 fps 1080p (Full HD) at 30/60 fps Slow-motion at 1080p@240fps or 720p@960 fps			
Camera	Front		12 megapixels 3840x2160p (4K UHD) at 30/60 fps 1080p (Full HD) at 30 fps			10 megapixels 3840x2160p (4K UHD) at 30/60 fps 1080p (Full HD) at 30 fps
Others			Ultrasonic (In-Display) Fingerprint Sensor; Reverse Wireless Charging (Qi-certified); USB 3.2; 25W Super Fast Charging	Ultrasonic (In-Display) Fingerprint Sensor; Reverse Wireless Charging (Qi-certified); USB 3.2; 45W Super Fast Charging		Optical (In-Display) Fingerprint Sensor; Reverse Wireless Charging (Qi-certified); USB 3.2; 25W Super Fast Charging

=== Samsung Galaxy S25 ===
Samsung announced the Galaxy S25 series on 22 January 2025. Other variants of the device include the Galaxy S25 Edge (announced on 13 May 2025), and the Galaxy S25 FE (announced on 4 September 2025).

			Galaxy S25	Galaxy S25+	Galaxy S25 Ultra	Galaxy S25 Edge	Galaxy S25 FE
Display			6.2" Dynamic LTPO AMOLED 2X 1–120 Hz (adaptive) (2340×1080px)	6.7" Dynamic LTPO AMOLED 2X 1–120 Hz (adaptive) (3120×1440px)	6.9" Dynamic LTPO AMOLED 2X 1–120 Hz (adaptive) (3120×1440px)	6.7" Dynamic LTPO AMOLED 2X 1–120 Hz (adaptive) (3120×1440px)	6.7" Dynamic AMOLED 2X 60–120 Hz (adaptive) (2340×1080px)
Processor			Qualcomm Snapdragon 8 Elite				Samsung Exynos 2400
Storage			128/256/512 GB (non-expandable)	256/512 GB (non-expandable)	256/512 GB/1 TB (non-expandable)	256/512 GB (non-expandable)	128/256/512 GB (non-expandable)
RAM			12 GB		12/16 GB	12 GB	8 GB
Battery			4000 mAh	4900 mAh	5000 mAh	3900 mAh	4900 mAh
Camera	Rear	Main	50 megapixels		200 megapixels		50 megapixels
Camera	Rear	Ultrawide	12 megapixels				
Camera	Rear	Telephoto	10 megapixels		3x: 10 megapixels 10x Periscope: 50 megapixels		8 megapixels
Camera	Rear	Video	7680x4320 (8K) at 24/30 fps 3840x2160p (4K UHD) video at 30/60 fps 1080p (Full HD) at 30/60 fps Slow-motion at 1080p@240fps or 720p@960 fps				
Camera	Front		12 megapixels 3840x2160p (4K UHD) at 30/60 fps 1080p (Full HD) at 30 fps				
Others			Ultrasonic (In-Display) Fingerprint Sensor; Reverse Wireless Charging (Qi-certified); USB 3.2; 25W Super Fast Charging	Ultrasonic (In-Display) Fingerprint Sensor; Reverse Wireless Charging (Qi-certified); USB 3.2; 45W Super Fast Charging		Ultrasonic (In-Display) Fingerprint Sensor; Reverse Wireless Charging (Qi-certified); USB 3.2; 25W Super Fast Charging	Ultrasonic (In-Display) Fingerprint Sensor; Reverse Wireless Charging (Qi-certified); USB 3.2; 45W Super Fast Charging

== See also ==
- Samsung Electronics
- Samsung Galaxy
- Comparison of Samsung Galaxy S smartphones
- Samsung Ativ S
- Samsung Galaxy Note
- Samsung Galaxy A series
- Samsung Galaxy Tab
- Samsung Galaxy Tab S series
- Samsung Galaxy Z series
- Samsung Galaxy Book
