= Samsung Galaxy S Duos 2 =

Android-based smartphone by Samsung Electronics

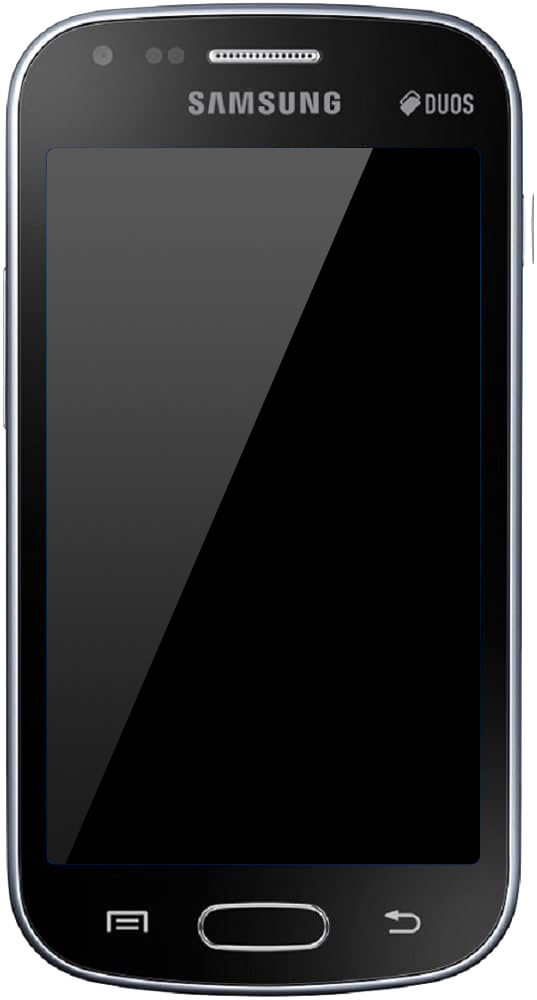
- Samsung Galaxy S Duos 2 in Black
- Manufacturer: Samsung
- Type: Touchscreen smartphone
- Series: Galaxy S
- First released: 5 December 2013; 12 years ago
- Predecessor: Samsung Galaxy S Duos
- Successor: Samsung Galaxy S Duos 3
- Related: Samsung Galaxy Trend Plus
- Compatible networks: GSM/GPRS/EDGE; 850/900/1800/1900 MHz; UMTS/HSPA (3.5G); 850/900/1900/2100 MHz up to 21/5.76 Mbps
- Form factor: Slate
- Dimensions: H: 121.5 mm (4.78 in); W: 63.1 mm (2.48 in); D: 10.6 mm (0.42 in)
- Weight: 118 g (4.2 oz)
- Operating system: Android 4.2.2 Jelly Bean (can be upgraded to unofficial LineageOS 14.1 and AOSP 7.1.2 and Ressurrection Remix 5.8.0 build by Ishant Vivek and Sandpox.)(Android Oreo ROM still under development.)
- System-on-chip: Broadcom BCM21664T
- CPU: 1.2 GHz dual core Cortex-A9
- GPU: Broadcom VideoCore IV
- Memory: 768 MB RAM
- Storage: 4 GB flash memory
- Removable storage: microSD up to 64 GB
- Battery: 1,500 mAh Lithium-Ion battery
- Rear camera: 5.0 Megapixel AF, LED flash, Geo-tagging
- Front camera: 0.3 Megapixel
- Display: 4.0 in (10 cm) TFT LCD; 233 PPI 16M color Corning Gorilla Glass 2
- Media: Audio: MP3, AAC, AAC+, eAAC+, Ogg Vorbis; Video: MP4, H.264, H.263
- Connectivity: Wi-Fi 802.11b/g/n Bluetooth 4.0 with A2DP; GPS, A-GPS, GLONASS; Micro USB 2.0; 3.5 mm TRRS audio jack FM radio with RDS support
- Data inputs: Capacitive touchscreen Push-buttons; Accelerometer; Digital compass Proximity sensor
- Development status: available
- SAR: 0.27 W/kg (head); 0.65 W/kg (body)

The Samsung Galaxy S Duos 2 is an Android-based smartphone with dual SIM support produced, released and marketed by Samsung Electronics, which serves as an immediate successor to the original Galaxy S Duos. It is the dual SIM version of the Samsung Galaxy Trend Plus.

Unveiled on 30 November 2013 at some Asian markets, it was initially released on December 5, 2013 in several countries. In contrast with other Dual SIM Samsung models, this phone is a part of the high-end "S" series. The external and physical design of the model is identical to the original model, placing emphasis on internal upgrades such as upgraded processor and updated operating system software.

== Specifications ==
=== Hardware and design ===
The design of the S Duos 2 is the same as that of the S Duos. It features a rounded, polycarbonate chassis, faux metal trim and a removable rear cover, typical of most Samsung smartphones since the Galaxy S III. The S Duos 2 is available in Black, and White frost color finishes. The S Duos 2's screen is a 4.0-inch (102 mm) 233p TFT LCD panel, which is the same as that of the S Duos.

== Camera ==
The Galaxy S Duos 2 has a 5-megapixel camera with LED flash and 0.3-megapixel front-facing camera. The rear camera has 7 shooting modes. This rear camera can record video in 720p, 480p and 240p.

Unlike entry-level dual SIM models from Samsung, the S Duos 2 is active on both SIMs all the time so it is ready to receive calls on either SIM when a call is not already in progress. Optionally it can receive two calls simultaneously, but this requires divert-on-not-reachable to be set up on each number and is subject to availability from the carrier and may incur additional charges. A limitation of the phone is that only one SIM can be active on UMTS (and therefore data) at a time and so it may be unsuitable for certain combinations of networks.

The S Duos 2 also contains a 1500 mAh removable battery. It lasts somewhere in 4–5 hours in heavy usage and just over 3 hours in gaming.

=== Software ===
The S Duos 2 ships with Android 4.2.2 "Jelly Bean" and Samsung's TouchWiz software. The S Duos 2 adds some of the Galaxy S4's features such as the widgets which were upgraded to the Samsung proprietary widgets used by models bearing the version of the OS.

Current support is brought unofficially through custom ROMs.

== See also ==
- Comparison of Samsung Galaxy S smartphones
- Samsung Galaxy
- Samsung Galaxy S series

Preceded by Samsung Galaxy S Duos	Samsung Galaxy S Duos 2; 2013	Succeeded by Samsung Galaxy S Duos 3
