= Samsung Galaxy S Advance =

Smartphone

Samsung i9070 Galaxy S Advance
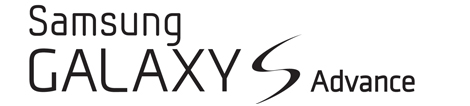

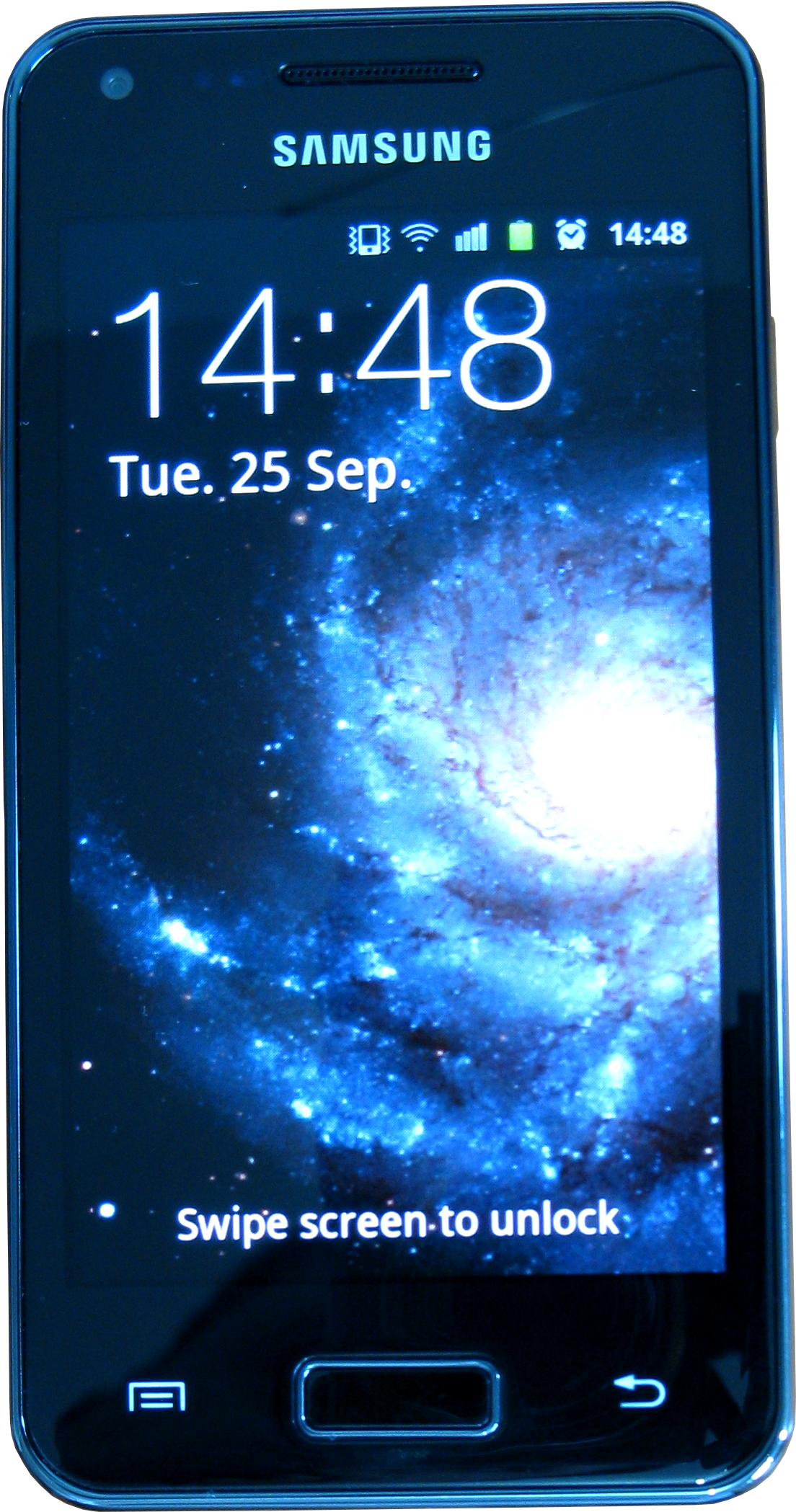
- Samsung Galaxy S Advance i9070
- Manufacturer: Samsung Electronics
- Series: Galaxy
- First released: April 2012; 14 years ago
- Availability by region: International
- Predecessor: Samsung Galaxy S Samsung Galaxy S Plus; Samsung Galaxy SL
- Successor: Samsung Galaxy S II
- Compatible networks: 2G: GSM 850 / 900 / 1800 / 1900; 3G: HSDPA 850 / 900 / 1900 / 2100
- Dimensions: 123.2×63×9.69 mm (4.850×2.480×0.381 in)
- Weight: 120 g (4 oz)
- Operating system: Original: Android 2.3.6 "Gingerbread"; Current: Android 4.1.2 "Jelly Bean"
- System-on-chip: STE NovaThor U8500
- CPU: 1 GHz Dual-core ARM Cortex-A9
- GPU: ARM Mali-400MP
- Memory: 768 MB RAM (555 MB available for user processes: Gingerbread) (625 MB available for user processes: Jellybean)
- Storage: 8 GB or 16 GB
- Removable storage: microSD up to 32 GB
- Battery: 1500 mAh removable battery
- Rear camera: 5 Mpx Back-illuminated sensor with auto focus and 720p video recording at 30fps
- Front camera: 1.3 Mpx
- Display: 4 in (100 mm) Super AMOLED 800x480 resolution (~233 ppi)
- Connectivity: HSPA, Bluetooth 3.0, Wi-Fi, DLNA, Kies Air, NFC (optional), USB
- Data inputs: Multi-touch capacitive touchscreen, headset controls, Proximity sensor, Ambient light sensor, 3-axis Gyroscope, Magnetometer, Accelerometer, aGPS
- Codename: Janice
- SAR: Head: 0.36 W/kg 1 g Body: 0.96 W/kg 1 g Hotspot: 0.96 W/kg 1 g
- Website: Official Website

The Samsung GT-I9070 Galaxy S Advance (also known as the Samsung Galaxy S II Lite) is an Android-based smartphone manufactured by Samsung Electronics. It was announced on 30 January 2012 and released in April 2012 as an "advanced" variant to the original Galaxy S.

== Specifications ==
=== Design ===
The design of the Galaxy S Advanced is an evolution of the design of the Galaxy S. The device has a plastic build. It has a 4-inch display at the front; the display has a curvature from bottom to top. There is a Home button and two capacitive buttons (menu and back buttons) on the lower bezel of the display while there is a "Samsung" logo, a front facing camera, an earpiece and sensors on the upper bezel of the display. On the side frame; there is a volume rocker at the left side, there is a power button at the right side and there is a microUSB port and a 3.5 mm headphone jack at the bottom; the top part of the side frame is unoccupied. It measures 123.2 x 63 x 9.69 mm and weighs 120 grams.

=== Hardware ===
Galaxy S Advance has a 4-inch Super AMOLED display with a resolution of 480 x 800 pixels and -233 ppi pixel density. It is powered by ST-Ericsson Nova Thor U8500 SoC with dual-core ARM Cortex-A9 CPU running at 1 GHz and ARM Mali-400 MP GPU along with the 768 MB RAM. It has 8 or 16 GB internal storage expandable by using a microSD card, a 5 MP rear camera with autofocus and 720p video recording and a 1.3 MP fixed focus front-facing camera for video calls or self-portrait photography. It doesn't have 4G connectivity.

=== Software ===
Galaxy S Advance is running Android 2.3.6 "Gingerbread" with Samsung's TouchWiz user interface out of the box. The device comes with ChatON, Find My Mobile and Samsung Hub preinstalled.

Galaxy S Advance can be officially updated to Android 4.1.2 (Jelly Bean). The Jellybean 4.1.2 update for the Samsung Galaxy S Advance was released beginning with the Russian firmware on 7 January 2013 and was then released in other markets. This new firmware update now includes Samsung's TouchWiz Nature UX and almost all of Jellybean's rich features. Users can update their existing Gingerbread firmware via KIES or over-the-air updates once the update is made available to their country or region.

==== Aftermarket firmware support ====
Official Samsung OTA update for Samsung Galaxy S Advance stopped at the last update of Android 4.1.2 Development of Galaxy S Advance.

== Reception ==
The phone received generally positive reviews from critics. Natasha Lomas from CNET reviewed the Samsung I9070 Galaxy S Advance and she gave it 8.3 points out of 10. She praised the design but criticized the plastic rear cover and the outdated Android operating system version. She considered the phone as "a solid addition to the Galaxy line-up".

Luke Johnson from TechRadar reviewed the Samsung I9070 Galaxy S Advance and he gave it 3.5 stars out of 5. He praised the design and the dual core CPU, and considered the device as a very balanced phone as a whole. However, he criticized the web browser. He concluded that the device "sets itself apart on a hardware front more than on the software side of things".

GSMArena reviewed the Samsung I9070 Galaxy S Advance. Although they were mostly positive about the device, they considered the lack of 1080p video recording, the PenTile matrix of the AMOLED display, the lack of camera shutter key and the outdated Android operating system version as the main disadvantages of the device.

Niall Magennis from Trusted Reviews reviewed the Samsung I9070 Galaxy S Advance, giving it 3.5 stars out of 5. The device was considered as "a good, all round package" but was criticized for its price. The AMOLED display, the dual-core processor and good camera performance was considered as the pros while the outdated Android operating system version was considered as the cons of the device.

== See also ==
- Comparison of Samsung Galaxy S smartphones
- Samsung Galaxy S series
