= Samsung Galaxy S II WiMAX =

Smartphone by Samsung Electronics

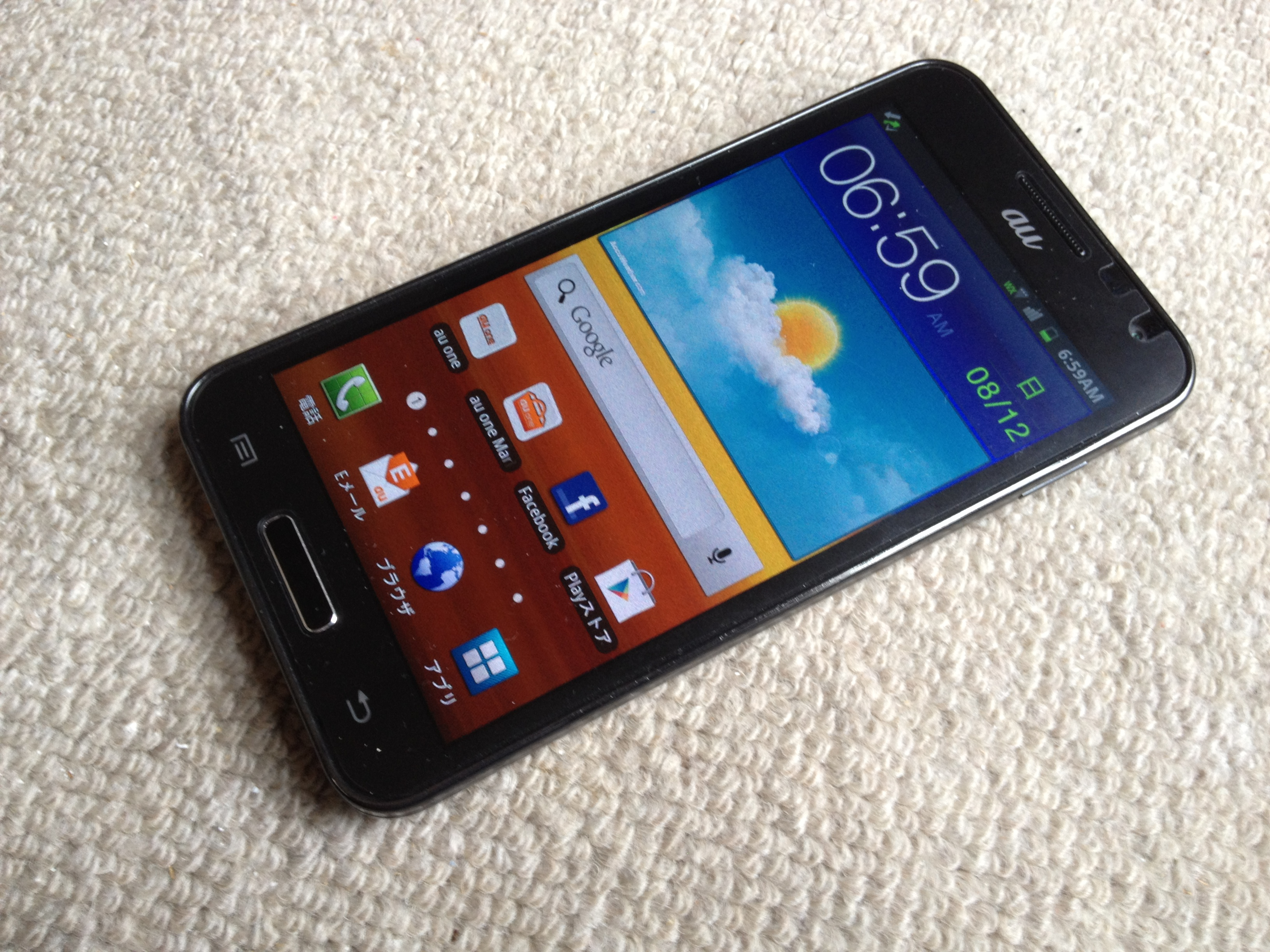
- Brand: Samsung
- Manufacturer: Samsung Electronics
- First released: January 20, 2012; 14 years ago (Noble Black); March 24, 2012; 14 years ago (Ceramic White); July 20, 2012; 14 years ago (Shiny Magenta)
- Operating system: Android 2.3.6 → 4.0.4
- CPU: Exynos 4210 Dual-core 1.4GHz
- Memory: 1 GB RAM
- Storage: 16 GB
- Battery: 1,850 mAh

The Samsung Galaxy S II WiMAX ISW11SC is an Android-based smartphone developed by Samsung Electronics, and sold by au in Japan.

It is the first phone in the Galaxy series, and is the final model to be compliant with the WiMAX Standard. It supports Wi-Fi tethering. It is one of a series of smartphones compatible with CDMA 1X WIN. Its production model number is SCI 11. The manufacturer's model number is SCH-J001.

== Characteristics ==
It is the first model of Galaxy series to feature near-field communication (NFC). However, it is not compatible with Osaifu-Keitai.

The Ver.001 IC card can be used for regular communication, but if it is used for authentication of NFC function, it needs to be replaced with the ver.002 - a card with brown and white stripes. Normal cards that are the size of ver.002 are supported by adding a terminal.

The user interface adopts Samsung's original TouchWiz 4.0 UX.

The logo (cursive style design) uses a new typeface stamped sequentially from models of 2012 spring model and later including this model. The logo appears immediately after startup and displays the text "au".

This phone is neither IP67 and IP68 certified which means it is neither water nor dust-proof.

The "KDDI E-mail application" pre-installed in this model is different from the "KDDI E-mail application" installed in the Fall / Winter 2011 model · Xperia acro (IS 11 S) · HTC EVO WiMAX (ISW 11 HT). A ringtone can be set to something other than preset.

== History ==
- January 16, 2012 (Heisei 24) - Official announcement from KDDI and Samsung Telecommunications Japan.
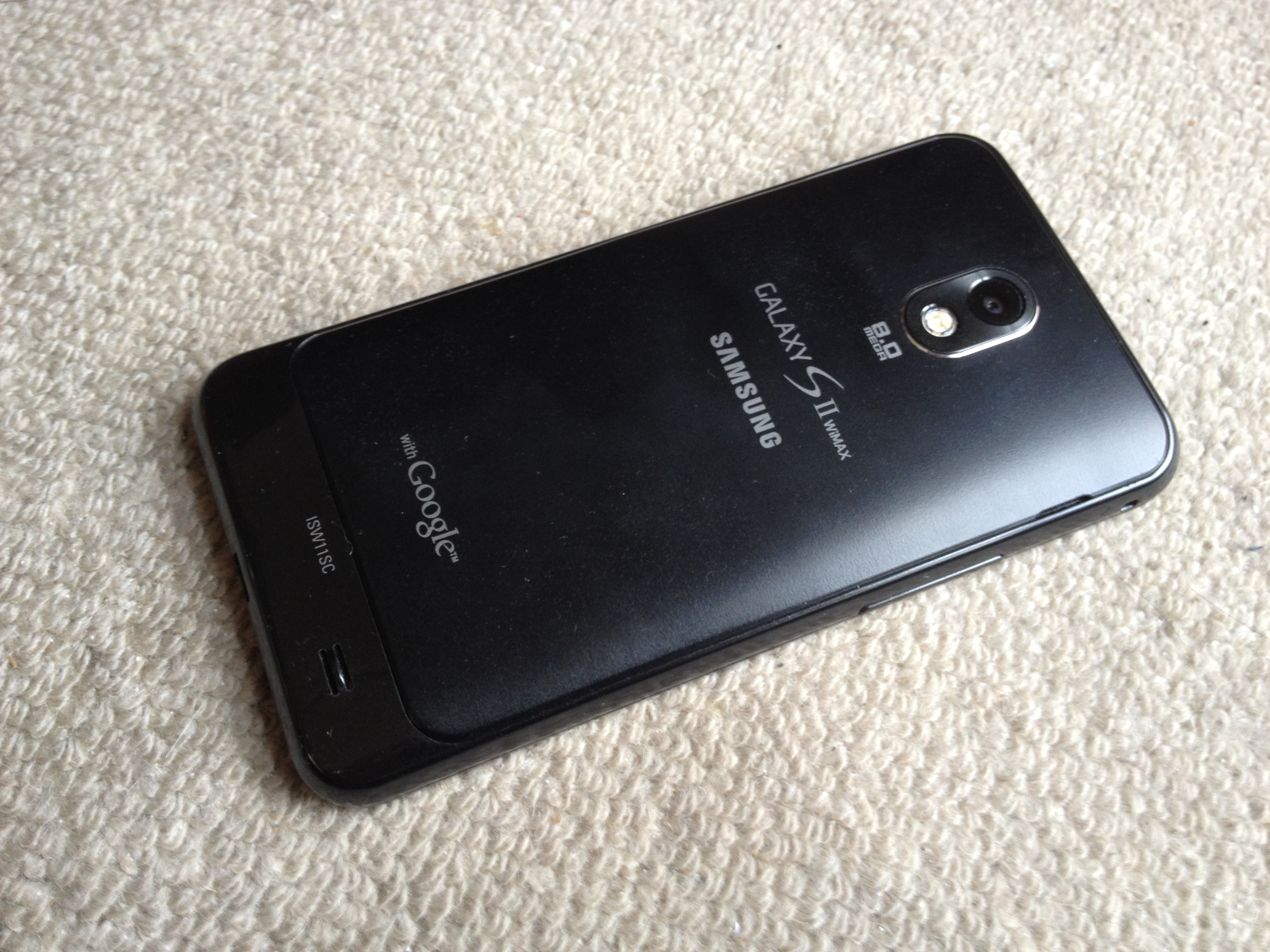
  ISW11SC BACK
- January 20, 2012 - Noble black is released all over the country.
- February 16, 2012 - 1st Software Update Start.
- March 24, 2012 - Ceramic White is additionally released in the Chubu area.
- March 25, 2012 - Ceramic white is additionally released in the Kanto area.
- March 28, 2012 - Ceramic white is additionally released in Chūgoku, Kyushu, Okinawa area.
- March 30, 2012 - Ceramic white is additionally released in the remaining districts other than the above.
- May 15, 2012 - Shiny Magenta announced additional.
- May 22, 2012 - 2nd Software Update Start. 2012
- July 20 - Shiny Magenta is additionally released at Chubu, Hokuriku, Shikoku and Kyushu areas.
- July 21, 2012 - Shiny Magenta is additionally released in Hokkaido, Tohoku, Kanto, Kansai and Chūgoku.
- July 25, 2012 - Shiny Magenta is additionally released in the Okinawa area.
- August 16, 2012 - 3rd Software Update started.
- September 13, 2012 - 4th Software Update (Version upgrade to Android 4.0.4 begins.)
- September 15, 2012 - Because some defects were confirmed in software, we temporarily suspended updates to Android 4.0.4.
- October 2, 2012 - 5th software update (Resume updating to Android 4.0.4.)
- February 14, 2013 - 6th software update started.

== Main functions / services ==
* A PC web browser is equipped as standard and Flash contents can be displayed fully. The mobile site (EZWeb) cannot be viewed like any other smartphone or PC.

Main functions · Supported services
Web browser	LISMO! for Android Media Player LISMO WAVE	Mobile wallet NFC	~~1seg~~
One mail PC Mail; Gmail; EZweb Mail	Decome	Skype	PC document
Smart; Sports; Run & Walk; Karada; Manager; Golf (web version) Fitness, pedometer	GPS Azimuth meter	Navi walk Passenger's seat navi	News EX GREE
Jibun bank	Earthquake Early Warning	Bluetooth	Wireless; LAN function (Wifi); Tethering (Wi-Fi · USB) + WiMAX (Mobile WiMAX)
~~Infrared~~ ~~communication~~	~~WIN HIGH SPEED~~	Global Passport (CDMA)	Femtocell
microSD microSDHC	Motion sensor (6 axes)	Waterproof Dustproof	Answer; Phone; Incoming call rejection setting

- Safe security pack is full compliant

== Update ==
- A February 16, 2012 mobile update fixed problems with turning the phone on.
- On May 22, 2012, another update increased the phone's range, while.
- On August 16, 2012, a display problem when SMS (C Mail) is received was remedied.
- On February 14, 2013, a problem with microSD card initialization was fixed.
- On April 25, 2013, a problem that prevented sending and receiving e-mail was fixed.
- The upgrade to Android 4.0.4 began on September 13, 2012, but it was stopped temporarily on 15 September 2012 to correct a problem. The upgrade was resumed on October 2, 2012. The Bluetooth version changed from 3.0 + HS to 3.0 + EDR. The au widget was added. It was security pack compatible. International calling + code calling function was added. Configuration change of setting menu Items of the setting menu are changed. Items such as "data use" and "development" increased. The data usage of each application can be viewed. The option menu, music player and video application menu changed. Restart was added to the OFF menu. The email application was improved.

== See also ==
- Samsung Electronics
- Samsung Galaxy
- Samsung Galaxy S II
