= Open Handset Alliance =

Consortium of firms that develops open standards for mobile devices

- Abbreviation: OHA
- Formation: November 5, 2007; 19 years ago
- Type: Open mobile platform (Android) development organization
- Headquarters: Mountain View, California, U.S.
- Region served: Worldwide
- Website: Official website

The Open Handset Alliance (OHA) is a consortium led by Google that developed the Android mobile operating system. Its member firms included HTC, Sony, Dell, Intel, Motorola, Qualcomm, Texas Instruments, Samsung Electronics, LG Electronics (formerly), T-Mobile, Nvidia, and Wind River Systems.

== History ==
The OHA was established on November 5, 2007, with 34 members, including mobile handset makers, application developers, some mobile network operators and chip makers. As part of its efforts to promote a unified Android platform, OHA members are contractually forbidden from producing devices that are based on competing forks of Android.

By 2011, Ars Technica said it served "little purpose besides a stamp of approval for OHA members".

A similar consortium was created in January 2014, the Open Automotive Alliance, to bring the Android platform to vehicles.

== Products ==
At the same time as the announcement of the formation of the Open Handset Alliance on November 5, 2007, the OHA also unveiled the Android Open Source Project, an open-source mobile phone platform based on the Linux kernel. An early look at the Android SDK was released to developers on November 12, 2007.

The first commercially available phone running Android was the HTC Dream (also known as the T-Mobile G1). It was approved by the Federal Communications Commission (FCC) on August 18, 2008, and became available on October 22 of that year.

== Members ==
The members of the Open Handset Alliance are:

Joining date	Network operators	Software developers	Component manufacturers	Device manufacturers	Other
November 2007	KDDI Corporation; NTT DoCoMo; Sprint Nextel; T-Mobile; China Mobile; Telecom Italia; Telefónica	Ascender Corporation; eBay; Google; LivingImage; Myriad; Nuance Communications; PacketVideo; SkyPop; SONiVOX; Wind River Systems	Audience; Broadcom Corporation; CSR Plc.; Intel Corporation; Marvell Technology Group; NVIDIA Corporation; Qualcomm; Synaptics; Texas Instruments	HTC; LG; Sony (joined as Sony Ericsson); Motorola Mobility (joined as Motorola); Samsung Electronics	Flex Comix; Nexus Telecom; The Astonishing Tribe
December 2008	Vodafone; Softbank	OMRON	AKM Semiconductor; ARM; Atheros Communications; ST-Ericsson (joined as Ericsson Mobile Platforms)	Asus; Garmin; Huawei Technologies (banned May 2019); Sony Mobile (joined as Sony Ericsson); Toshiba	Borqs; Teleca
May–June 2009	China Unicom	SVOX		Acer	
September 2009				MIPS Technologies	
January 2010	Bouygues Telecom			ZTE Corporation	Sasken Communication Technologies Limited
May 2010		NXP Software			
July 2010		Access		MediaTek	
November 2010		VisualOn			
June 2011		Intrinsyc			
July 2011		Andago			
Date unknown, before 2015	China Telecommunications Corporation; Telus	Cooliris; Motoya Co., Ltd.	Cypress Semiconductor Corporation; Freescale Semiconductor; Gemalto; Renesas Electronics Corporation; Via Technologies	Alcatel Mobile Phones; Compal Communications; Dell; Foxconn; Haier; Kyocera; Lenovo; NEC; Sharp Corporation; Saygus; Honor	Accenture; L&T Infotech; SQL Star International Inc.; Wipro Technologies

== See also ==
- Symbian Foundation
- Tizen Association
- Open Mobile Alliance
- Automotive Grade Linux
- List of open-source mobile phones
