= Samsung Galaxy S (1st generation) =

2010 Android smartphone by Samsung

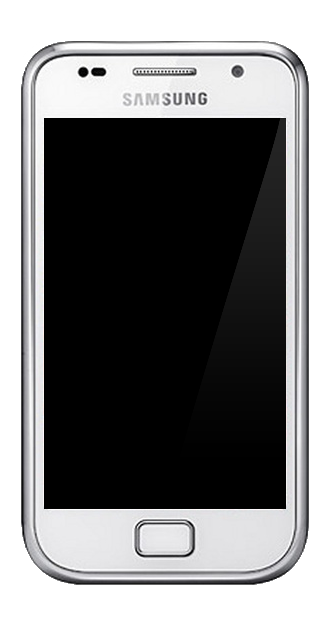
- Samsung Galaxy S
- Developer: Samsung Electronics
- Manufacturer: Samsung Electronics
- Type: Smartphone
- Series: Samsung Galaxy S
- First released: 4 June 2010; 16 years ago
- Discontinued: 6 March 2012; 14 years ago
- Units sold: 24 million (as of 14 January 2013)
- Predecessor: Samsung Galaxy; Samsung S8300 UltraTouch
- Successor: Samsung Galaxy S II; Samsung Galaxy S Plus
- Related: Samsung Galaxy Player; Nexus S Samsung Omnia 7 Samsung Focus
- Compatible networks: Dual band CDMA2000/EV-DO Rev. A 800 and 1,900 MHz; WiMAX 2.5 to 2.7 GHz; 802.16e 2.5G (GSM/GPRS/EDGE): 850, 900, 1,700, 1,800, 1,900, and 2,100 MHz; 3G (HSDPA 7.2 Mbit/s, HSUPA 5.76 Mbit/s): 900, 1,900, and 2,100 MHz; TD-SCDMA (China Mobile Only)
- Form factor: Smartphone (most versions); Slider (Sprint version)
- Dimensions: 122.4 mm (4.82 in) H 64.2 mm (2.53 in) W 9.9–14 mm (0.39–0.55 in) D
- Weight: 119 g (4.20 oz)
- Operating system: Android 2.1 (Eclair), upgradable to 2.3 (Gingerbread), TouchWiz UI 3
- System-on-chip: Samsung Exynos 3110 (previously known as Hummingbird S5PC110)
- CPU: 1.0 GHz ARM Cortex A8
- GPU: PowerVR SGX 540
- Memory: 512 MB RAM
- Storage: 8 GB / 16 GB
- Removable storage: microSDHC (up to 32 GB)
- SIM: miniSIM
- Battery: Removable Li-Ion 1,500 mAh Battery
- Rear camera: 5 MP with auto focus; 720p HD video 29.45 FPS (12 Mb/s); auto-focus; self-shot, action, panorama, smile shot; face detection; anti-shake; add me
- Front camera: 0.3 Megapixel (VGA)
- Display: 4.0 in (100 mm) Super AMOLED with RGBG-Matrix (Pentile); 480x800 px WVGA (233 ppi)
- External display: TV out via headphone jack and mDNIe via WiFi (HD)
- Sound: SoundAlive, 16 kHz 64 kbit/s mono in HD video recording
- Connectivity: 3.5 mm TRRS; Wi-Fi 802.11b/g/n; DLNA; Bluetooth 3.0; micro-USB 2.0; FM radio with RDS with recording
- Data inputs: Multi-touch capacitive touchscreen display, Ambient light sensor, microphone, 3-axis Magnetometer (Compass), aGPS, 3-axis accelerometer, stereo FM radio with RDS and Swype, physical QWERTY keyboard (on Sprint version only)
- Model: GT-I9000
- Codename: Galaxy
- SAR: Head: 0.325 W/kg 1 g Body: 0.422 W/kg 1 g Hotspot: -
- Other: TV out, integrated messaging Social Hub, Google Play, GALAXY Apps, A-GPS, Augmented reality with Layar Reality Browser, video messaging, Exchange ActiveSync (offline and no SIM Mode), voice command, RSS reader, Widgets, Smart security

The Samsung Galaxy S (retrospectively referred to unofficially as the Samsung Galaxy S1, Galaxy SI or simply S1) is a touchscreen-enabled, slate-format Android-based smartphone developed and marketed by Samsung Electronics. It is the first smartphone of the Samsung Galaxy S series. It is the first device of the third Android smartphone series produced by Samsung and is the first Samsung Galaxy smartphone to also be released for Asian and North American phone carriers. It was announced on March 23, 2010 during Samsung's Galaxy Unpacked event in Las Vegas, and was released on June 4, 2010. After the release of Android 2.2 "Froyo" for the Samsung Galaxy S, Samsung released a successor to the device called S LCD or SL and ceased production of the original I9000 model due to shortage of Super AMOLED displays.

The Samsung Galaxy S merged formerly separate Galaxy and Ultra Edition products and is produced in over two dozen variations. The international 'GT-I9000' reference version features a 1 GHz ARM "Hummingbird" processor, a PowerVR SGX540 graphics processor, 2 or 4 GB of internal flash memory, a 4 in (10 cm) 480×800 pixel Super AMOLED capacitive touchscreen display, Wi-Fi connectivity, DLNA support, a 5-megapixel primary camera and a 0.3-megapixel secondary front-facing camera. Derivative models may include localized cellular radios or changes to button layouts, keyboards, screens, cameras or the Android OS.

At the time of its release, the Galaxy S included the fastest graphical processing of any smartphone, was the thinnest smartphone at 9.9 mm and was the first Android phone to be certified for DivX HD.

As of 2013, over 25 million Galaxy S units have been sold. The Galaxy S name continued on with the semi-related Snapdragon-based Galaxy S Plus and NovaThor-based Galaxy S Advance smartphones. The next major release of the series was the Samsung Galaxy S II, which was introduced in May 2011.

== Launch ==
The phone was initially launched in Singapore on June 4, 2010. Before the end of its first weekend on sale in Singapore, Samsung tweeted that Singtel, the exclusive carrier to sell the device in Singapore, was sold out of devices. On Friday, June 25, 2010, the phone was launched in Malaysia and South Korea. Overall the launch schedule comprised launches on 110 carriers in 100 countries at the same time. U.S. Variants named as Epic, Vibrant, Fascinate, Captivate, and Mesmerize were released from June through September 2010.

== Reception ==
CNET Asia gave the Galaxy S a favorable review with a score of 8.4/10. The Galaxy S was compared to current high-end Android-based phones such as the HTC Desire, Xperia X10, Nexus One, and smartphones using different operating systems like the iPhone 4, which runs iOS, and HTC HD2, which runs Windows Mobile in CNET Asia.

GSMArena.com described the Galaxy S as having "perfect audio quality," claiming the phone's superior all-round performance made it a "new leader of the Android pack."

TIME listed the Galaxy S as #2 device in "Top 10 Gadgets" of 2010, praising its Super AMOLED display.

The phone was criticized by some reviewers for sub-par GPS performance. Anandtech, reviewing the Epic 4G variant, said, "the phone will take an inordinate amount of time to determine your actual location, and/or it won’t pinpoint your location very accurately." Engadget described the GPS in the Vibrant and Captivate variants as "utterly broken and non-functional … this is a problem for which there's no reasonable explanation why it made it all the way to retail devices." Samsung released an application for the Captivate and Vibrant variants only that resets the phone's GPS settings to factory defaults. TechRadar acknowledged GPS faults in the Galaxy S and stated that these have been fixed in the Google Nexus S. There is, however, a solution to the problem and it includes opening it and welding the antenna contacts with the motherboard.

== Hardware ==
=== Processor ===
The Samsung Galaxy S used the Samsung S5PC110 processor. This processor combined a 45 nm 1 GHz ARM Cortex-A8 based CPU core with a PowerVR SGX 540 GPU made by Imagination Technologies which supported OpenGL ES 1.1/2.0 and is capable of up to 90 million triangles per second. The CPU core, code-named "Hummingbird", was co-developed by Samsung and Intrinsity. This processor was subsequently renamed to the Samsung Exynos 3110 in October 2011.

=== Memory ===
The Samsung Galaxy S has 512 MB of LPDDR1 RAM (Mobile DDR). Some variants also come with either 8 GB or 16 GB of OneNAND memory combined in a package-on-package stack with the processor. An external microSD card slot supports up to 32 GB of additional storage memory.

=== Screen ===
The Samsung Galaxy S uses a 101.6-millimetre (4.00 in) Super AMOLED touch screen covered by Gorilla Glass, a special crack and scratch resistant material. The screen is a WVGA PenTile display manufactured by Samsung.

=== Audio ===
The phone uses Wolfson's WM8994 DAC as its audio hub.

=== Camera ===
Samsung Galaxy S has a 5 megapixel back camera with no optical but digital zoom. It has sensor type 1/3.6" (rectangle 4×3 mm), which is a bit smaller in size than usual sensor in digital compact cameras, which have 1/2.33"-1/2.5" type sensor. It also has a 0.3 megapixel VGA front camera.

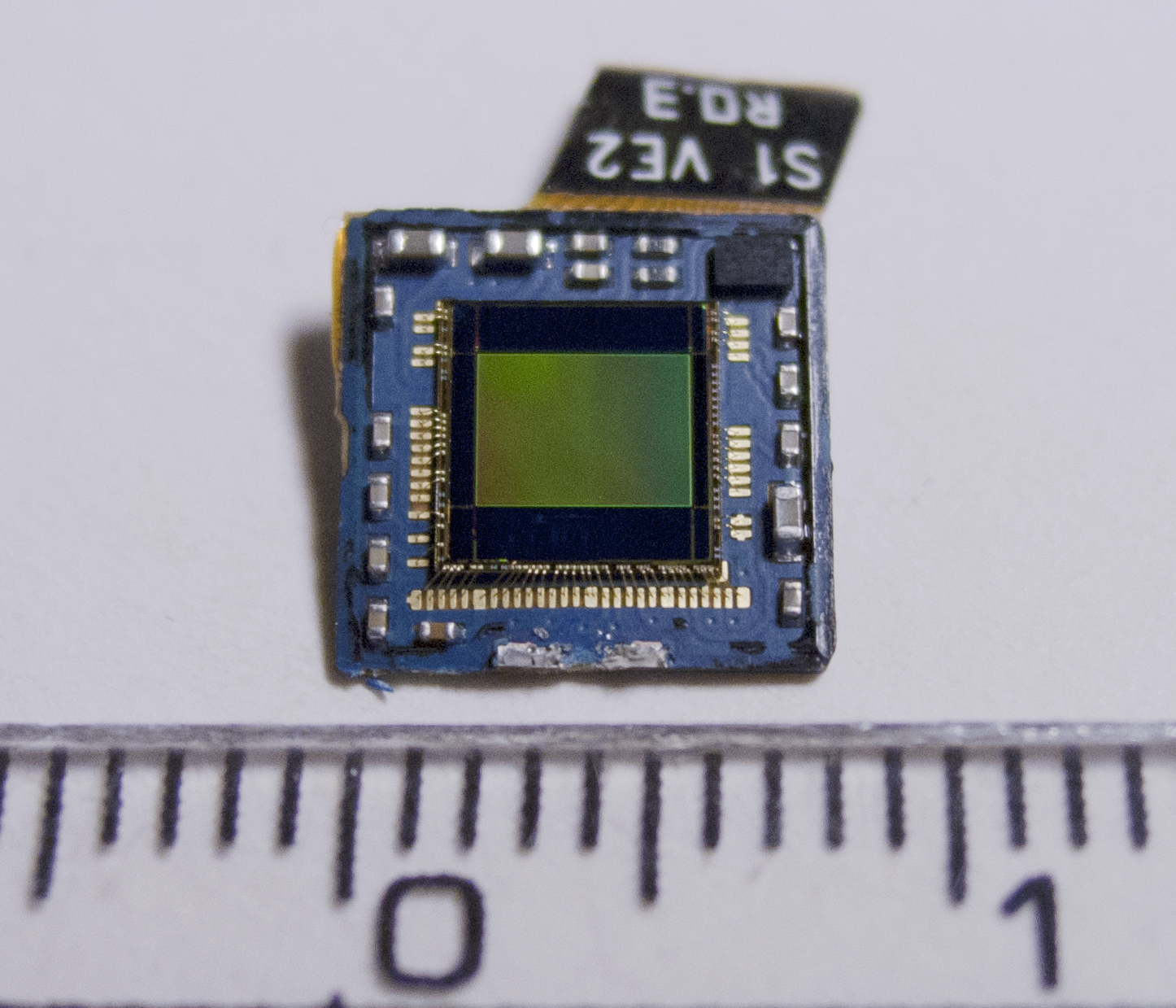
Samsung Galaxy S (i9000) camera with 1/3.6" type sensor (4 mm × 3 mm)

=== GPS ===
The Samsung Galaxy 'S' was well known for the poor performance of the GPS module. This was due to poor electrical connectivity caused by the use of 'conductive rubber'. Modification of the i9000 to improve GPS performance was a popular hardware modification within the handset hacker community.

== Software ==
=== User interface ===
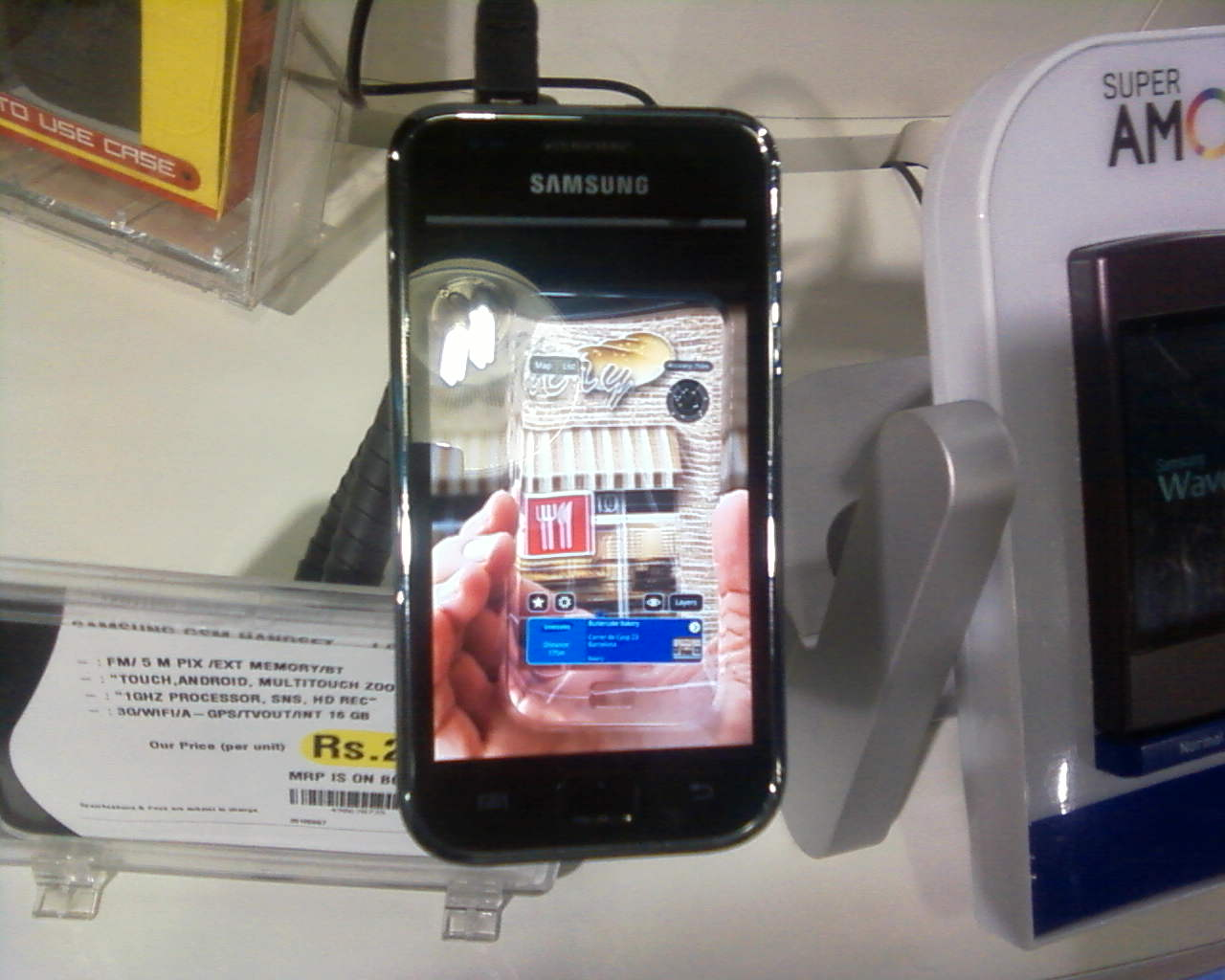
Samsung Galaxy S on display at a mobile phone showroom in India

The phone employs the proprietary Samsung TouchWiz 3.0 user interface. Unlike TouchWiz 3.0 on the Samsung Wave, it allows up to seven homescreens. However, different from other Android user interfaces, TouchWiz 3.0 allows users to add, delete and rearrange homescreens. The program launcher is also different from other Android user interfaces in that it has an iOS-like program menu which allows customization of shortcuts. In addition, three of the four shortcuts at the bottom of the screen can also be customized.

The Epic 4G features a specialized version of TouchWiz based on TouchWiz 3.0. Because of the Epic 4G's QWERTY slide-out keyboard, the homescreen needed to be able to rotate into landscape mode. The other Galaxy S TouchWiz 3.0 devices do not support this feature.

The most important aspect of all three generations of TouchWiz is the widget interface. The most prominent widgets that come with the Galaxy S are the Daily Briefing, weather clock and the Buddies Now widget. In addition to Samsung widgets, standard Android widgets can be added and removed from the homescreens.

=== Bundled applications ===
Other provided software includes the Layar Reality Browser, a program that visualizes GPS direction, and Aldiko, an ebook reader. The phone also comes with various upgraded versions of software that came with Samsung's previous generation of smartphones (such as i8910HD and i8000 Omnia II).

=== Media support ===
The Galaxy S comes with support for many multimedia file formats, including audio codecs (FLAC, WAV, Vorbis, MP3, AAC, AAC+, eAAC+, WMA, AMR-NB, AMR-WB, MID, AC3, XMF), video codecs (mpeg4, H.264, H.263, Sorenson codec, DivX HD/ XviD, VC-1) and video formats (3GP (MPEG-4), WMV (Advanced Systems Format), AVI (divx), MKV, FLV).

=== Updates ===
==== Android 2.2 upgrade ====
At the time of launch, the Galaxy S had Android 2.1 ("Eclair") installed. An official upgrade to Android 2.2 ("Froyo") began rolling out worldwide in November 2010.

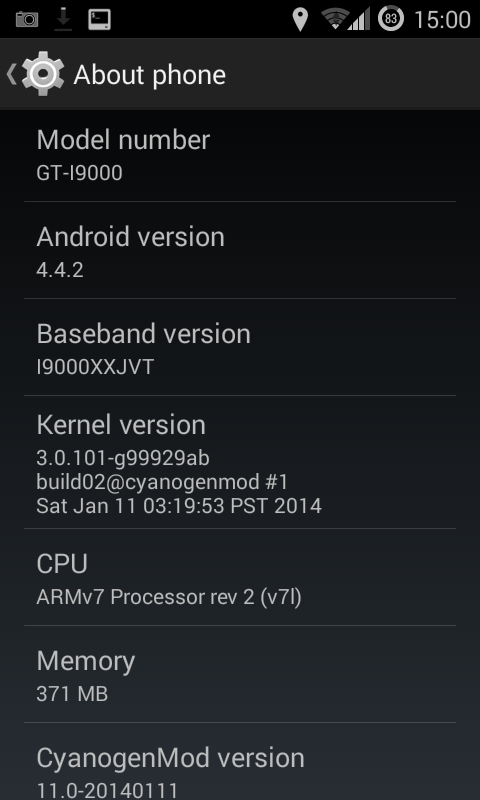
Android 4.4.2, CyanogenMod 11 installed on Samsung Galaxy S I9000

Canada received the 2.2 upgrade for select carriers on December 10, 2010.

According to Samsung, the 2.2 upgrade has come to the United States in 2011 for most versions of the handset (AT&T Captivate, Verizon Fascinate, T-mobile Vibrant, Sprint Epic). The 2.2 upgrade was released for T-Mobile on January 20, 2011. It enabled stock Android features that had previously been disabled such as Wi-Fi calling and mobile AP.

Verizon's Fascinate was upgraded to Android 2.2 in April 2011. Verizon's Continuum variant was upgraded to 2.2 in February 2012.

==== Android 2.3 upgrade ====
An Android 2.3 ("Gingerbread") update became available for Nordic countries, The Netherlands and Germany on April 16, 2011. The update reached UK, India and Hong Kong by the start of Nov, 2011. Singapore received the update in June. Australia received the update in August. The Samsung Epic for Sprint started receiving the Gingerbread update on November 9, 2011, and the update was released for the Samsung Galaxy S 4G on November 15. As of December 1, 2011, the Samsung Fascinate on Verizon has been updated to Gingerbread 2.3 (Droid-Life).

T-Mobile in the United States made the 2.3 upgrade available on November 15, 2011. Currently, this update is only available on T-Mobile's 4G model (SGH-T959V). T-Mobile USA never produced a 2.3 update for its original Samsung Galaxy S (SGH-T959). The SGH-T959V update is available at their website. On January 10, 2012, AT&T provided an update to Gingerbread (2.3.5) to the owners of the Captivate (SGH-I897). The update was possible through a manual update using Kies Mini.

==== Android 4.0 and later ====
An official update to Android 4.0 was never released, as Samsung felt that the Galaxy S did not have enough memory (RAM) to run the TouchWiz interface on top of Android 4.0. In lieu of Android 4.0, Samsung released a "Value Pack" update for the Galaxy S in March 2012 in South Korea, which maintains the 2.3 (Gingerbread) -based operating system, but includes new features from Android 4.0 such as Face Unlock, improvements to the launcher, the ability to take still photographs while recording video, and a redesigned photo editor.

However, unaffiliated developers associated with CyanogenMod produced unofficial updates based on Android 4.0, 4.1, 4.2, 4.3 and 4.4 for the Galaxy S and its variants. These updates are developed from Android Open Source Project (AOSP) code. LineageOS 14.1, based on Android 7.1, has also been ported to the device.

=== Unofficial ===
The device was popular with the software modification community due to the popularity of the handset and supported by CyanogenMod until the demise of the project in 2016. The Galaxy S is currently supported by the Replicant Operating System, which, at the moment of writing gives Android 4.2.2 capability. In 2017, LineageOS v14.1 (which is CyanogenMod's successor) based on Android 7.1.2 Nougat, was unofficially ported to the phone, and uploaded to XDA.

== Variants ==
=== International ===
Galaxy S unbranded models
Model	GT-I9003	GT-I9000	GT-I9000B	GT-I9000M	GT-I9000T	GT-I9000/M8
Name	Galaxy SL	Galaxy S		Galaxy S Vibrant	Galaxy S	
Countries	World		Brazil	Canada	Americas	World
2G	850, 900, 1800, 1900 MHz; GSM / GPRS / EDGE					
3G	900, 1900, 2100 MHz; UMTS / HSPA		850, 1900, 2100 MHz; UMTS / HSPA			850, 900, 1900, 2100 MHz; UMTS / HSPA
Broadcast receiver	FM Tuner		FM Tuner, ISDB-T 1seg	FM Tuner		
Dimensions	123.7 × 64.2 × 10.6 mm (4.87 × 2.53 × 0.42 in)	122.4 × 64.2 × 9.9 mm (4.82 × 2.53 × 0.39 in)				
Weight	131 g (4.62 oz)	119 g (4.20 oz)				124 g (4.37 oz)
Screen	SC-LCD 4.0 in	Super AMOLED 4.0 in				
Secondary camera	0.3 MP / F2.8				–	0.3 MP / F2.8
Release date	Feb 2011	Jun 2010		Aug 2010		

International versions of the Galaxy S closely resemble the 'GT-I9000' reference version.

==== GT-I9000B ====
The Brazilian "GT-I9000B" includes an ISDB-T 1seg digital television tuner with program guide, closed caption and recording support. The units are manufactured locally by Samsung to take advantage of tax cuts associated with local production.

==== GT-I9000M ====
The Canadian "GT-I9000M" drops UMTS band VIII support for UMTS band V support. Bell, Virgin Mobile and SaskTel offer the model.

==== GT-I9000T ====
The "GT-I9000T" changes UMTS band VIII support for UMTS band V support. It is offered by Telcel in Mexico, Telstra in Australia and numerous other carriers throughout Latin America and the Caribbean.

==== GT-I9000/M8 ====
The "GT-I9000/M8" is the only model to include a quad-band 3G UMTS radio. It is offered primarily in Australia and New Zealand.

==== GT-I9003 ====
The "GT-I9003" is a late-model, reduced-cost version of the Galaxy S. It substitutes the 4-inch Super AMOLED screen with a cheaper 4-inch SuperClear-LCD screen. It also swaps the Hummingbird SoC with a Texas Instruments OMAP 3630 SoC, which includes the slower PowerVR SGX530 graphics processor and TWL5030 DAC. To compensate for the increased power draw of the SC-LCD screen, battery capacity is increased from 1,500 to 1,650 mAh.

=== North America ===
Galaxy S branded models (North America)
Model	SGH-I997	SGH-I897 SGH-I896	SGH-T959	SGH-T959V/W	SCH-I500	SCH-S950C	SPH-D700	SCH-I405	SCH-I405U	SCH-R930	SCH-S720C	SCH-R910	SCH-R915
Name	Infuse	Captivate; Galaxy S Captivate	Vibrant	Galaxy Vibrant 4G	Fascinate; Mesmerize; Showcase	Galaxy S Showcase	Epic 4G	Stratosphere	Metrix	Stealth; Galaxy S Aviator	Galaxy Proclaim	Indulge	
Countries	Canada; United States		United States	Canada; United States	United States								
Carriers	AT&T; Rogers		T-Mobile	T-Mobile; Wind Mobile	Verizon; US Cellular; C Spire	Straight Talk/NET10	Sprint	Verizon	US Cellular		Straight Talk/NET10	MetroPCS	Cricket
2G	850, 900, 1800, 1900 MHz; GSM / GPRS / EDGE				800, 1900 MHz; CDMA IS-2000								800, 1700, 1900 MHz; CDMA IS-2000
3G	850, 1900, 2100 MHz; UMTS / HSPA+	850, 1900, 2100 MHz; UMTS / HSPA	1700, 2100 MHz; UMTS / HSPA	1700, 2100 MHz; UMTS / HSPA+	800, 1900 MHz; CDMA 1xEV-DO								800, 1700, 1900 MHz; CDMA 1xEV-DO
4G	–						2500 MHz; WiMax	700 MHz; LTE	700, 850, 1700, 1900 MHz; LTE		-	1700, 2100 MHz; LTE	–
Dimensions	132 × 71 × 8.9 mm (5.2 × 2.8 × 0.35 in)	122 × 64 × 9.9 mm (4.82 × 2.53 × 0.39 in)			124 × 65 × 15 mm (4.90 × 2.54 × 0.60 in)	125 × 64 × 9.9 mm (4.92 × 2.52 × 0.39 in)	125 × 64 × 10.5 mm (4.92 × 2.52 × 0.41 in)	126 × 65 × 14 mm (4.96 × 2.56 × 0.55 in)		130 × 68 × 11.7 mm (5.12 × 2.68 × 0.46 in)	114.3 × 59.7 × 11.7 mm (4.50 × 2.35 × 0.45 in)	117 × 61 × 15 mm (4.6 × 2.4 × 0.6 in)	
Weight	113 g (4.0 oz)	118 g (4.2 oz)			155 g (5.46 oz)	118 g (4.16 oz)	116 g (4.1 oz)	164 g (5.78 oz)		144 g (5.1 oz)	115 g (4.05 oz)	150 g (5.3 oz)	
CPU	Cortex-A8 1.2 GHz	Cortex-A8 1.0 GHz											
Screen	Super AMOLED+ 4.5 in	Super AMOLED 4.0 in								Super AMOLED+ 4.5 in	TFT 3.5 in		
Form factor	Touchscreen Slate						QWERTY Slider			Touchscreen Slate		QWERTY Slider	
Primary camera	8.0 MP	5.0 MP / F2.6								8.0 MP	3.0 MP		
Secondary camera	1.3 MP / F2.8	–		1.3 MP / F2.8	–			1.3 MP / F2.8			–		
Release date	May 2011	July 2010		Feb 2011	Sep 2010		Aug 2010	Oct 2011		Apr 2011		Feb 2011	

North American versions of the Galaxy S moderately differ from the "GT-I9000" reference version. Most use a 4-button layout, drop the FM tuner and front camera, and include UMTS band V support. A number of models also include 4G support and a physical QWERTY keyboard.

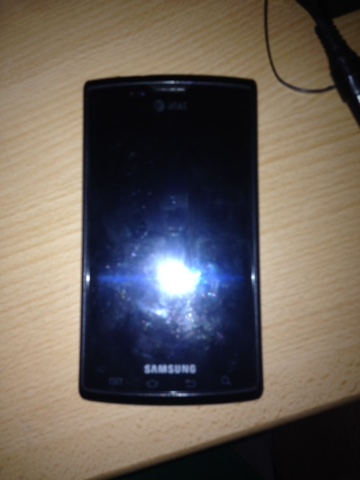
A Samsung Galaxy S Captivate i897

==== Captivate ====
AT&T released this variant (SGH-I897) and a slider version of the Captivate called the Captivate Glide for the United States on July 18, 2010, while Rogers released its own variant (SGH-I896) for Canada. Both variants include 16 GB of internal flash memory, but without the front camera, FM radio and LED camera flash present on other Galaxy S variants. Android 2.3 "Gingerbread" is available for this model. The Rogers version includes minor GPS functionality differences and the ability to use HSUPA.

==== Vibrant ====
T-Mobile released this variant (SGH-T959) for the United States on July 15, 2010, as a successor to the Behold II. It is the third Android 2.x phone officially supported by T-Mobile (after the Nexus One and MyTouch 3G Slide). Like the Captivate, it includes 16 GB of internal flash memory, but omits the front camera and FM radio, and lacks an LED camera flash. The SGH-T959 was only updated through Android 2.2.1.

T-Mobile and Wind Mobile also released the closely named Vibrant 4G (SGH-T959V/W) in February 2011. It adds HSPA+ support and a 1.3-megapixel front-facing camera. Android 2.3 "Gingerbread" is the last version available for this model.

==== Fascinate ====
Verizon released this variant (SCH-I500) for the United States on September 9, 2010. It omits the front camera and FM radio of the base model, but adds a LED flash. Android 2.3 "Gingerbread" is available. Its release was accompanied by some controversy over Verizon's decision to replace Google Search with Bing as the primary search engine. With the Gingerbread update, the Bing Search widget was removed and Google Search was restored as the primary search engine. The final version of Android officially released for the Fascinate was 2.3 Gingerbread.

The SCH-I500 is also known as the Mesmerize for US Cellular and the Showcase for C Spire and Ntelos.

==== Galaxy S Showcase ====
Available on Straight Talk/NET10. Similar to the Verizon Fascinate (SCH-I500) but is thinner and lighter.

==== Epic 4G ====
Sprint released this variant (SPH-D700) for the United States on August 31, 2010. It lacks an FM radio, but it includes a LED flash, a message indication LED, a full slide-out QWERTY keyboard and 4G WiMax support. The included edition of TouchWiz in Android 2.1 had to be reworked to support landscape mode when using the QWERTY keyboard.

Android 2.3 "Gingerbread" is available as an official carrier upgrade, while as of July 2014 it is possible to upgrade to Android 4.4 ("KitKat") with CyanogenMod.

==== Stratosphere ====
The Verizon Stratosphere (SCH-I405) is similar to the Epic 4G. Main differences are an upgraded 1.3 MP front camera, 4G LTE support and no message LED. The US Cellular Metrix (SCH-I405U) adds several bands to the LTE support. All models were released with Android 2.3.

==== Indulge ====
The MetroPCS variant (SCH-R910) was released on February 21, 2011, for the United States. It was the first LTE smartphone at the time of its release. The Indulge shrinks the screen size from 4 inches to 3.5 inches, removes the front-facing camera, reduces the camera to 3.2 megapixels, removes the flash, lowers the screen resolution 480×320 pixels, and adds a full QWERTY keyboard. The Cricket model (SCH-R915) lacks LTE support, but adds CDMA 1xEV-DO support over AWS Band IV.

==== Galaxy Proclaim ====
Available on Straight Talk/NET10. Similar to the Cricket Indulge (SCH-R915) but lacks the QWERTY keyboard.

==== Infuse ====
AT&T released this variant (SGH-I997) for the United States on May 15, 2011, while Rogers released it for Canada on July 26, 2011. It includes a faster 1.2 GHz version of the Exynos "Hummingbird" SoC, 16 GB of internal flash memory, 8 MP primary camera, 1.3 MP secondary front-facing camera, HSPA+ support and an improved 4.5-inch Super AMOLED+ screen. AT&T has released an Android 2.3.6 update while Rogers has released 2.3.3.

==== Aviator ====
The US Cellular Aviator (SCH-R930) resembles the Infuse 4G, but uses the original 1.0 GHz Hummingbird SoC. It offers a dual-band CDMA and quad-band LTE radio.

=== Asia ===
Galaxy S unbranded models (Asia)
Model	SC-02B	SHW-M110S	SHW-M130K	SHW-M130L	SCH-I909	GT-I9008	GT-I9088
Name	Galaxy S		Galaxy K	Galaxy U	Galaxy S		
Country	Japan	South Korea			China		
2G	850, 900, 1800, 1900 MHz; GSM / GPRS / EDGE			800, 1900 MHz; CDMA IS-2000	800, 1900 CDMA; 850, 900, 1800, 1900 GSM	850, 900, 1800, 1900 MHz; GSM / GPRS / EDGE	
3G	800, 2100 MHz; UTMS / HSPA	900, 2100 MHz; UMTS / HSPA	900, 1900, 2100 MHz; UMTS / HSPA	800, 1900; CDMA 1xEV-DO		2000 MHz; TD-SCDMA	2100 MHz; UTMS-FDD
Broadcast receiver	–	T-DMB			FM Tuner	CMMB	–
Dimensions	122 × 64 × 10 mm		119 × 59 × 12.4 mm				122 × 64 × 10 mm
Weight	118 g	121 g	131 g		120 g		
CPU	Cortex-A8 1.0 GHz		Cortex-A8 1.2 GHz	Cortex-A8 1.0 GHz			
Screen	Super AMOLED 4.0 in		Super AMOLED 3.7 in		Super AMOLED 4.0 in		
OS	Android					OPhone	Android
Release date	Q3 2010	Q2 2010	Q3 2010				

==== SC-02B ====
In Japan, NTT Docomo carries the Galaxy S (SC-02B). It is similar to the GT-I9000, but omits the front-facing camera.

==== SHW-M110S ====
The Galaxy S (SHW-M110S) is an exclusive phone for SK Telecom subscribers. It differs from the GT-I9000 in that it includes a T-DMB tuner. It is sold under the "Anycall" branding.

==== SHW-M130K ====
KT offers this variant (SHW-M130K) for South Korea as the Galaxy K. It includes a tri-band UMTS radio, a faster 1.2 GHz Hummingbird SoC, a T-DMB tuner and a smaller 3.5-inch Super AMOLED screen. It is sold under the "Anycall" branding.

==== SHW-M130L ====
LG U+ offers this variant (SHW-M130L) for South Korea as the Galaxy U. It is similar to the Galaxy K, but instead offers a stock 1.0 GHz Hummingbird SoC and a CDMA 1xEV-DO radio.

==== SCH-I909 ====
China Telecom offers the SCH-I909 variant which supports both GSM and CDMA 2G standards and CDMA 3G.

==== SCH-I919 ====
China Telecom later offers this more advanced variant, sporting a design almost identical to the AT&T Infuse 4G, a Qualcomm S2 SoC, while retaining support for CDMA 3G.

==== GT-I9008 ====
China Mobile offers the GT-I9008 variant which supports GSM 2G and TD-SCDMA 3G standards. It includes a CMMB digital television tuner. It also uses the OPhone 2.0 platform as opposed to Android.

==== GT-I9088 ====
China Unicom offers the GT-I9088 variant which supports GSM 2G and UMTS-FDD 3G standards.

=== Nexus S ===
Model number	Model variation
GT-I9020 or GT-I9020T	900 / 1700 / 2100 MHz UMTS, Super AMOLED
GT-I9020A	850 / 1900 / 2100 MHz UMTS, Super AMOLED
GT-I9023	900 / 1700 / 2100 MHz UMTS, SC-LCD
SPH-D720	CDMA2000, 4G WiMAX, Super AMOLED
SHW-M200	900 / 1700 / 2100 MHz UMTS, Super AMOLED

The Nexus S is a Galaxy S-derived smartphone co-developed by Google and Samsung in 2010. The Nexus S differs from the Galaxy S in that it runs a stock version of Android provided by Google as opposed to the TouchWiz edition provided by Samsung and the mobile carriers. In addition, the Nexus S drops the microSD slot in favor of a NFC transmitter. The Nexus S has a small curvature Google refers to as "Contour Display"

Models for the United States, United Kingdom and Canada use a 4-inch Super AMOLED screen similar to the reference Galaxy S. Models for other markets use a 4-inch SuperClear-LCD (SC-LCD) screen.

The Nexus S originally shipped with Android 2.3 "Gingerbread". It can be upgraded to Android 4.1.2 "Jelly Bean".

== Legal ==
In a lawsuit filed on April 15, 2011, Apple accused Samsung of committing patent and trademark infringement with the touchscreen on Samsung Galaxy line of mobile products. This includes the Galaxy S smartphone and the Galaxy Tab 7.0 tablet.

== See also ==
- Comparison of Samsung Galaxy S smartphones
- Samsung Galaxy S series

Preceded by Samsung Galaxy	Samsung Galaxy S 2010	Succeeded by Samsung Galaxy S II
