= Sasken Technologies =

Indian multinational technology company

Sasken Technologies Ltd

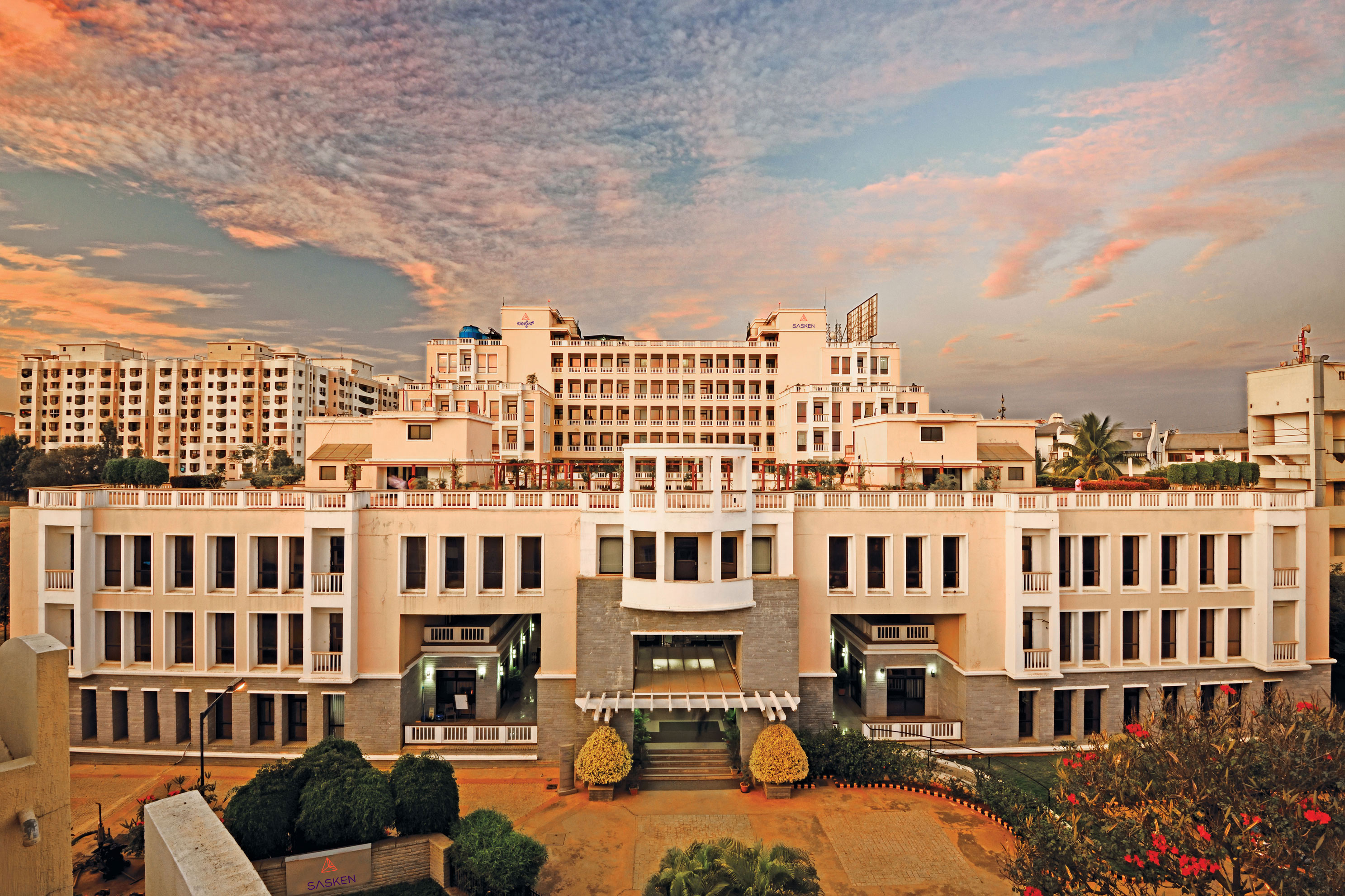
- Sasken's headquarters at Bangalore, India
- Formerly: Sasken Communication Technologies Limited
- Type: Public
- Traded as: BSE: 532663; NSE: SASKEN
- ISIN: INE231F01020
- Industry: Technology
- Founded: 1989; 37 years ago
- Headquarters: 139/25, Ring Road, Domlur, Bangalore, Karnataka, India
- Area served: Worldwide
- Key people: Rajiv C Mody (Chairman, MD and CEO); Priyaranjan (CFO)
- Services: Product engineering; Digital engineering; Embedded software; Semiconductor engineering; ODM
- Revenue: ▲₹ 504.31 crores (FY 18–19)
- Net income: ▲₹ 90.42 crores (FY 18–19)
- Number of employees: 2,000 (March 2019)
- Website: www.sasken.com

Sasken Technologies is an Indian multinational product engineering and embedded software company with its headquarters in Bengaluru, India.

== Origin ==
Sasken was founded by Rajiv C Mody, its chairman & MD, and three other co-founders: Krishna Jhaveri, Suresh Dholakia, and Badruddin Agarwala. Sasken came into being as Silicon Automation Systems in 1989 in a small warehouse in Fremont, California. Later, the company changed its name to Sasken Communication Technologies Limited. The name 'Sasken' is a portmanteau of its original name (SAS) and 'ken', the Scottish word for knowledge.

Sasken acquired the operations of Blue Broadband Technologies in 2005, creating Sasken Network Engineering Limited (SNEL). Sasken acquired iSoftTech Private Limited, Chennai in June 2006. In September 2006, Sasken acquired the Finnish company Botnia Hightech Oy, now known as Sasken Finland Oy.

On 24 January 2007, Sasken entered into a joint venture with Tata Autocomp, known as TACO Sasken Automotive Electronics Pvt Ltd (TSAE).

In February 2017, Sasken Communication Technologies Limited announced that it had changed its name to Sasken Technologies Limited. In January 2018, Sasken unveiled a new logo.

In July 2022, Sasken announced that Abhijit Kabra was appointed as the CEO. In June 2024, Sasken's board designated Rajiv C. Mody as CEO in addition to his existing position of chairman and managing director.

In April 2025, Sasken acquired Borqs, an embedded software and products company.
