= Samsung Galaxy S Plus =

2011 Android smartphone by Samsung

Samsung i9001 Galaxy S Plus

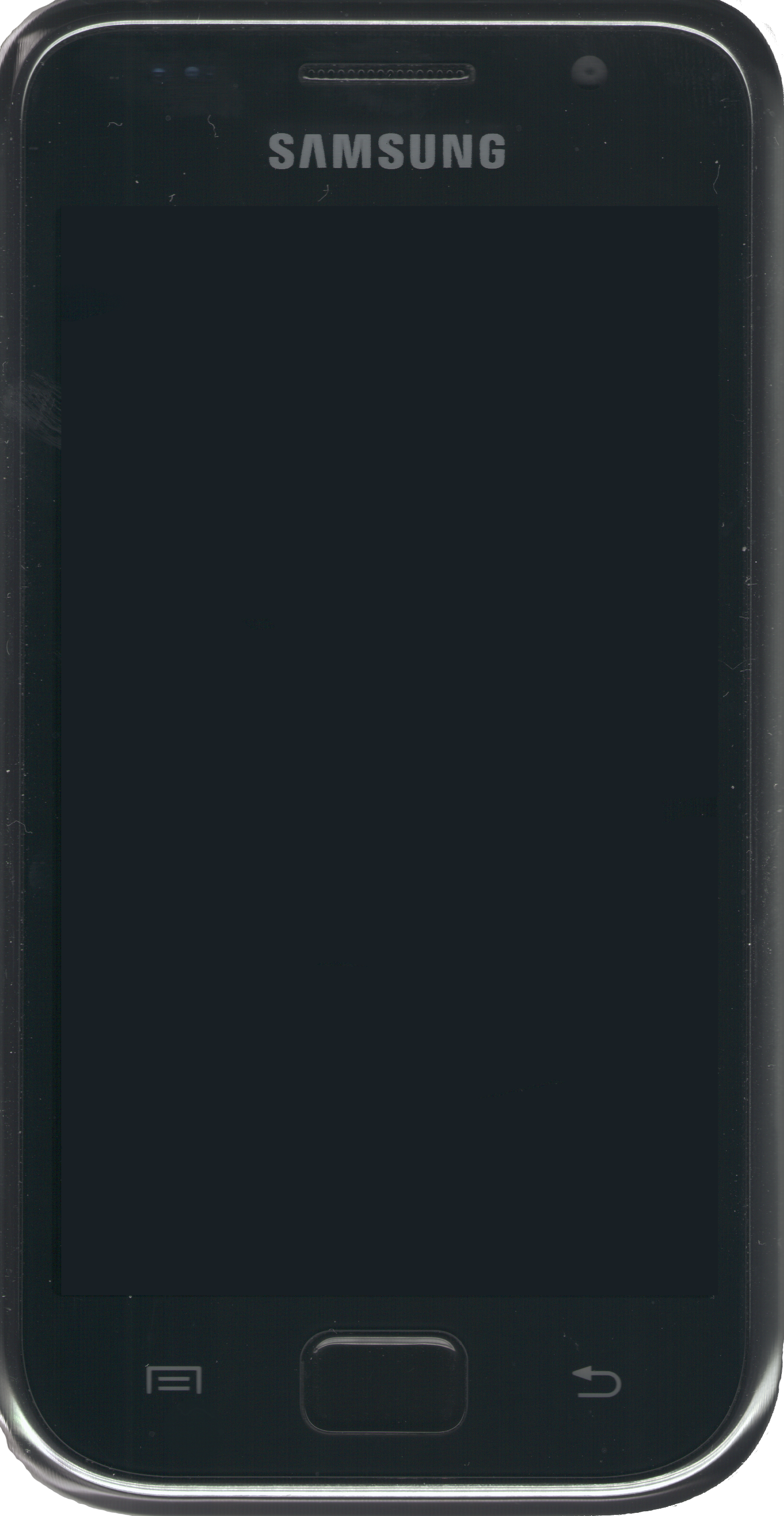
- Black Galaxy S Plus
- Manufacturer: Samsung Electronics
- Type: Touchscreen smartphone (Android)
- Series: Galaxy
- First released: July 2011
- Predecessor: Samsung Galaxy S
- Successor: Samsung Galaxy S III
- Related: Samsung Galaxy S II
- Compatible networks: Dual band CDMA2000/EV-DO Rev. A 800 and 1,900 MHz; WiMAX 2.5 to 2.7 GHz; 802.16e 2.5G (GSM/GPRS/EDGE): 850, 900, 1,700, 1,800, 1,900, and 2,100 MHz; 3G (HSDPA 14.4 Mbit/s, HSUPA 5.76 Mbit/s): 900, 1,900, and 2,100 MHz;
- Form factor: Slate
- Dimensions: 122.4 mm (4.82 in) H 64.2 mm (2.53 in) W 9.9–14 mm (0.39–0.55 in) D.
- Weight: 119 g (4.2 oz)
- Operating system: Android 2.3.6 Gingerbread with TouchWiz UI: Multi-touch capacitive touchscreen display; Ambient light sensors; Microphone; 3-axis Magnetometer (Compass); aGPS; 3-axis accelerometer; Stereo FM Radio With RDS and Swype
- System-on-chip: Qualcomm Snapdragon MSM8255T
- CPU: 1.4 GHz (1 core)
- GPU: Qualcomm Adreno 205
- Memory: 512 MB RAM
- Storage: 8 or 16 GB (flash nand memory)
- Removable storage: micro-SD up to 32 GB
- Battery: Li-ion 1650 mAh
- Rear camera: 5 MP with auto focus; 720p HD video (12 Mbps); self-, action, panorama, and smile shot; stop motion; add me Front-facing VGA camera
- Display: 4.0 in (10 cm) Super AMOLED with RGBG-Matrix (Pentile); 800×480 px WVGA
- Connectivity: Bluetooth 3.0; micro-USB 2.0; Wi-Fi 802.11b/g/n; DLNA; FM radio with RDS

The Samsung GT-I9001 Galaxy S Plus or Samsung Galaxy S 2011 Edition or Samsung Galaxy S+ is an Android-based smartphone, introduced July 2011.

The Galaxy S Plus features the Qualcomm Snapdragon S2 MSM8255T chipset with a 1.4 GHz Qualcomm Scorpion processor, which is faster than the original Samsung Galaxy S's 1.0 GHz single-core processor. It is accompanied by the Adreno 205 (enhanced) GPU which is slightly slower than the PowerVR SGX540.

It originally came with Android 2.3.3, but it can be upgraded officially to Android 2.3.6. The device also unofficially supports CyanogenMod versions up to 12.1 (Android 5.1). The device's processor can be also overclocked up to 1.8 GHz with a custom kernel.

== See also ==
- Comparison of Samsung Galaxy S smartphones
- Samsung Galaxy S series
