= OPhone =

Mobile operating system

- Developer: OPhone Software Developers Network
- Working state: No longer supported
- Source model: Open source
- Initial release: 2 August 2009; 17 years ago
- Final release: OPhone 2.5 / 22 April 2011; 15 years ago
- Supported platforms: ARM, MIPS, Power ISA, x86
- Kernel type: Monolithic (Linux)
- License: Apache 2.0 and GPLv2
- Official website: web.archive.org/web/20130524223043/http://www.ophonesdn.com/

OPhone (also known as OPhone OS, and sometimes called OMS, short for Open Mobile System) was a mobile operating system running on the Linux kernel and based on early versions of Android. The operating system was developed for China Mobile by software firm Borqs.

== History ==
OPhone was a smartphone software platform developed by China Mobile and based on the Linux kernel and Android operating system. OPhone was based on open source software and mobile internet technologies. Android was modified for local Chinese markets by China Mobile's OPhone Software Developers Network.

The system provided a limited mobile internet experience using China Mobile's proprietary TD-SCDMA (3G) network and its GSM (2G) network.

== Devices ==
The OPhone operating system has only appeared on China Mobile phones, and a modified version of OMS appeared on other carriers as Android+, also developed and maintained by Borqs.

The first publicly released device to feature the operating system was Lenovo O1, a collaboration between China Mobile and Lenovo.

== Software development ==
In 2009 Q1, the 1.0 version was released, corresponding to Android 1.0.

In 2009 Q4, the 1.5 version was released, corresponding to Android 1.5 (Cupcake).

In 2010 Q2, the 2.0 version was released, corresponding to Android 2.1 (Eclair). According to a Sina Tech release, this iteration would include support for the Windows Mobile API framework. By April 2010, around 600 apps were developed specifically for OPhones.

In 2011 Q1, the 2.5 version was released, corresponding to Android 2.2 (Froyo). This was the last confirmed release of the operating system, which has not received updates since then.
