= Samsung Galaxy SL =

2011 Android smartphone by Samsung

Samsung Galaxy SL I9003

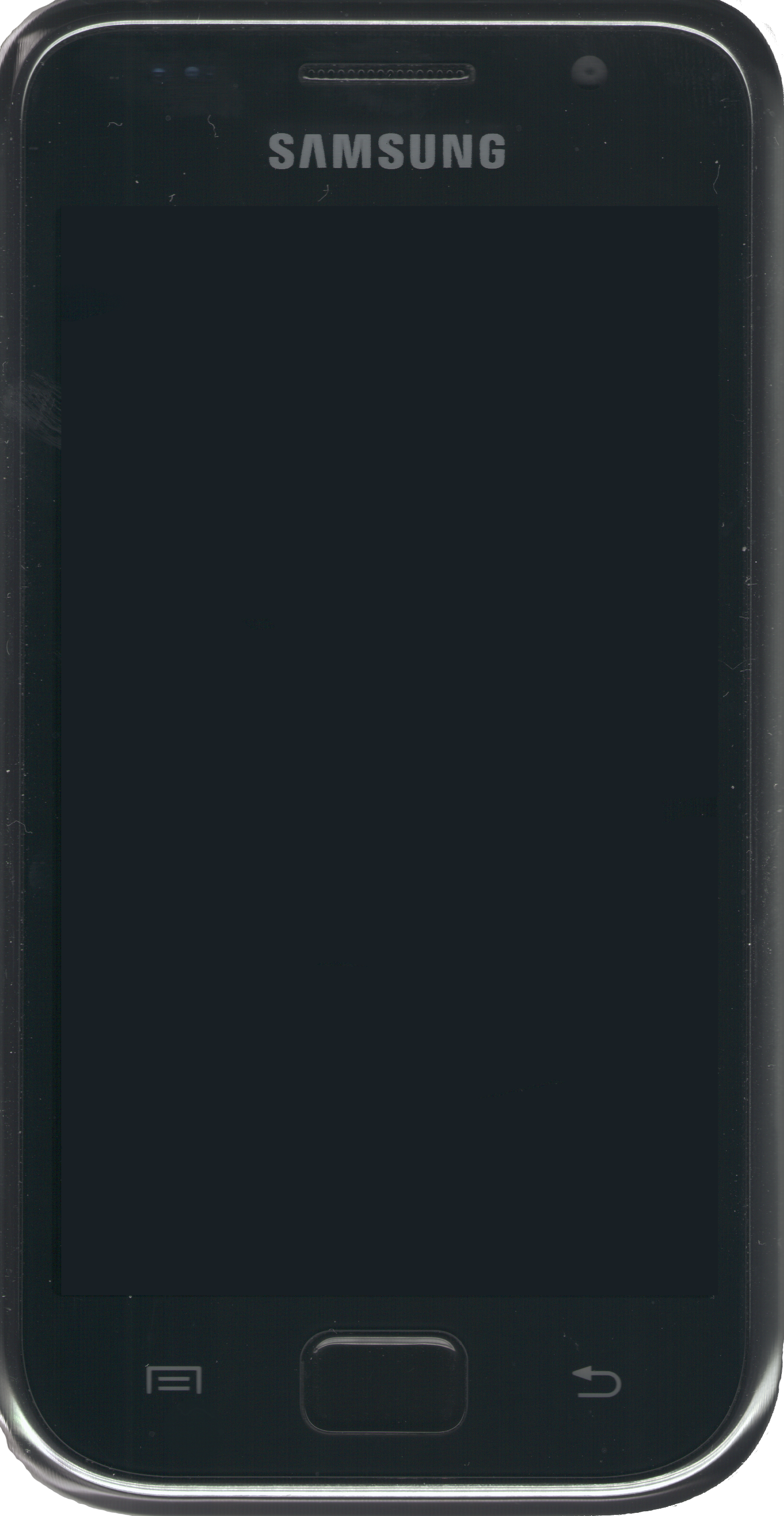
- Samsung Galaxy SL GT-i9003
- Brand: Samsung
- Manufacturer: Samsung Electronics
- Type: Smartphone
- Series: Galaxy S
- First released: February 2011
- Related: Samsung Galaxy S
- Compatible networks: GSM/GPRS/EDGE Quad-band (850, 900, 1,800, and 1,900 MHz); HSPA Tri-band (900, 1,700, and 2,100 MHz); HSDPA 7.2 Mbit/s; HSUPA 5.76 Mbit/s
- Form factor: Slate
- Dimensions: 123.7 mm (4.87 in) H 64.2 mm (2.53 in) W 10.6 mm (0.42 in) D
- Weight: 129 g (4.6 oz)
- Operating system: Original: Android 2.2.1 "Froyo" with TouchWiz UI 3.0; Current: Android 2.3.6 "Gingerbread" with TouchWiz UI 4.0
- System-on-chip: Texas Instruments OMAP 3630
- CPU: Single core 1GHz ARM Cortex-A8 Processor
- GPU: PowerVR SGX530 @ 200MHz
- Memory: 512MB, 486MB user-accessible RAM
- Storage: 4 GB (1.87 GB Internal phone storage) + (1.52 Internal SD storage); 16 GB (1.87 GB Internal phone storage) + (11.73 GB Internal SD storage)
- Removable storage: microSD
- Battery: 1,650 mAh; Rechargeable Li-ion; User replaceable
- Rear camera: 5.0 MP with autofocus, (2,560 x 1,920 resolution); Autofocus; 720p HD video recording @ 30 fps
- Front camera: 0.3 megapixels VGA (480 x 640)
- Display: SuperClear LCD, 4.0 in (100 mm) diagonal 480�800 px WVGA (233 ppi), 16M colors
- Connectivity: 3.5 mm TRRS; Bluetooth 3.0 with A2DP; GPS; DLNA; FM stereo receiver; microUSB 2.0; Wi-Fi 802.11b/g/n; Wi-Fi hotspot
- Data inputs: Multi-touch capacitive touchscreen A-GPS; Accelerometer; Ambient light sensor Magnetometer; Proximity sensor
- Other: Multi-touch capacitive touchscreen display; Ambient light sensor; Microphone; 3-axis magnetometer (Compass); A-GPS; 3-axis accelerometer; Stereo FM Radio with RDS; Swype

The Samsung Galaxy S LCD or Samsung Galaxy SL (GT-I9003) is an Android-based smartphone designed and manufactured by Samsung Electronics that was released in February 2011 due to shortage of Super AMOLED displays. It features a 1 GHz ARM Cortex-A8 processor, 4 GB of internal flash memory, a 4-inch (10 centimeters) 480x800 pixel WVGA Super Clear LCD capacitive touchscreen display, Wi-Fi connectivity, a 5-megapixel camera with a resolution of 2560x1920, and a front-facing 0.3 MP (640x480) VGA camera.

== Hardware ==
=== Screen ===
The Samsung Galaxy SL has a 10.16-centimetre (4.00 in) SuperClear LCD touch screen, protected by Gorilla Glass. The SC-LCD is cheaper than the AMOLED display used in Samsung Galaxy S. Furthermore, the display consumes more power compared to SuperAMOLED displays, although the phone ships with a higher capacity battery than the original Galaxy S to compensate for it. An advantage of the SuperClear LCD over the SuperAMOLED one is that the latter uses a PenTile Matrix layout that some users find less visually appealing, while the former is a true RGB display.

=== Audio ===
The phone uses a different DAC compared to the original Samsung Galaxy S. It uses the Texas Instruments' TWL5030 which is integrated into the OMAP 3630 chipset.

=== Processor ===
The Samsung Galaxy SL uses the Texas Instruments OMAP 3630 SoC, which includes a 45 nm 1 GHz ARM Cortex-A8 based CPU core with 65 nm Imagination Technologies' PowerVR SGX 530 GPU which supports OpenGL ES 1.1/2.0.

== Software ==
The phone was originally shipped with Android 2.2.1 Froyo, with Samsung's own proprietary TouchWiz 3.0 user interface. Samsung started to rolled out updates in October 2011 for upgrading to Android 2.3.6 Gingerbread. Users are required to use Kies PC Suite for upgrading to Gingerbread. Samsung also announced that the upcoming "value pack" update is expected to bring performance improvements to the phone, including TouchWiz 4.0, face unlock, etc. to all of their legacy Galaxy line smartphones. As of mid-June 2012, the value pack has been available in several regions.

Along with default Android apps, a few extra apps are included, like Voice Memo, Mini Diary, ThinkFree Document viewer, and Layar augmented reality browser. Like many other Samsung Galaxy devices, the playback of DivX/Xvid videos is supported. Adobe Flash 11 plugin for Android is also present.

=== Android 4.X support ===
In July 2012, Samsung announced that an official update to Android 4.1.2 ''Jelly Bean'' will not be provided, as they felt that all Galaxy S line did not have enough RAM to run their own proprietary TouchWiz user interface on top of Android 4.1.2. However, developers such as the CyanogenMod team, based on Android Open Source Project source code. Unofficial support for Android 4.4 KitKat has been made available since November 2013.

=== Media support ===
The phone comes with support for many multimedia file formats, including audio codecs (FLAC, WAV, Vorbis, MP3, AAC, AAC+, eAAC+, WMA, AMR-NB, AMR-WB, MID, AC3, XMF), video codecs (MPEG4, H.264, H.263, Sorenson codec, DivX HD/ XviD, VC-1) and video formats (3GP, MPEG-4, WMV, ASF, AVI, DivX, MKV, FLV).

== See also ==
- Samsung Galaxy S series
- Galaxy Nexus
- Android
- List of Android devices
