= ODM =

ODM may refer to:

== Computing ==
- .odm, Overdrive Media file
- IBM Operational Decision Management, IBM's Business Rule Management System (BRMS)
- Object Data Manager, a component of the AIX operating system used to store configuration information
- Object Data Modelling, similar to object–role modeling (ORM)
- Operational Data Model, an XML-based data model to describe and collect clinical trial data
- Ontology Definition MetaModel, an Object Management Group specification
- Oracle Data Mining, an optional extra for Oracle Database
- Oracle Directory Manager, part of Oracle Internet Directory, a tool for administering LDAP servers

== Other uses ==
- Odm., the abbreviation for the orchid genus Odontoglossum
- Office of Defense Mobilization, a United States government agency, active from 1950 to 1958
- Orange Democratic Movement, a Kenyan political party
- Original design manufacturer, a company that produces a product to be sold under another company's brand
