= Borqs =

Developer of IoT products and solutions

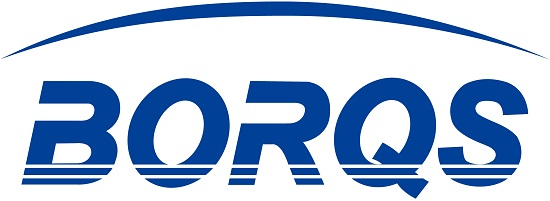
- Type: Public (Stock Quote:BRQS)
- Industry: Internet of Things
- Founded: 2007
- Headquarters: United States
- Key people: Pat Chan- Chief Executive Officer and Founder; Anthony Chan - Executive Vice President, Chief Financial Officer; Hareesh Ramanna - Executive Vice President and General Manager, Product BU; Simon Sun - Executive Vice President, Co-General Manager, Product Business Unit; George Thangadurai - Executive Vice President and President of International Business
- Products: E2E IoT Solutions
- Number of employees: 200-300
- Website: borqs.com

Borqs Technologies Inc. is a publicly traded Internet of Things manufacturer.

== History ==
Borqs has been a member of the Open Handset Alliance since 2008 and is also a member of the Symbian Foundation. Borqs is notable as the developer of the OPhone, or Open Mobile System (OMS), for China Mobile. The OPhone is a Linux-based open-source software platform that has been used in conjunction with China Mobile's proprietary TD-SCDMA 3G network.

Version 2.0 of the Ophone software was launched in late 2009, and gained 50,000 registered developers. China Mobile signed up more than 20 handset vendors to develop phones for the Ophone OS. OPhone accounted for 38% of the TD-SCDMA smartphone market at the end of 2011.

Borqs has brought its OPhone software to the US under the name Android+. Borqs provided software under the Android+ branding for Dell's line-up of smartphones in the US.

== History (Cont.) ==
- 2007–2008 - Established R&D centers in Beijing, China, Bengaluru, and India
- 2007 - Partnered with Google Open Handset Alliance (OHA)
- 2008 - China Mobile, Softbank, Vodafone and Borqs set the formation of Joint Innovation Laboratory (JIL)
- 2011 - Established strategic partnership with Intel
- 2011 - Cooperated with WAC to realize full compatibility with the Web Runtime 1.0 in the Google Android platform
- 2013 - Joined Linux Foundation
- 2013 - Established strategic partnership with Qualcomm
- 2014 - Established joint venture with Positivo in Brazil
- 2010–2014 - Established Android mobile services with China Mobile and SingTel Group
- 2014 - In cooperation with Sonim, Borqs delivered AT&T Push-To-Talk Android phone
- 2015 - Provided Android enhancement and product realization for Sprint's tablet
- 2015 - In cooperation with ElaCarte, Borqs developed ruggedized restaurant ordering tablets
- 2011–2015 - Developed 50+ Android devices, 10M+ commercial shipments in 15+ countries
- 2015–2016 - Supported Vizio for Smart TV remote control
- 2015–2016 - Provided the In-vehicle Infotainment (IVI) s/w and solutions for Geely
- 2016 - Supported Reliance for the world's first 4.75G phone
- 2016 - Launched Anda's Symbol-based Communication Wearable for Children at COMPUTEX 2016
- 2016 - Partnered with Qualcomm in developing the world's first 4G Android wearable device
- 2017 - Marked debut as a public company on The NASDAQ Stock Market under the trading symbol, BRQS.
- 2017 - Exhibited the world's first NB-IoT tracker based on Qualcomm's wear platform during China Mobile Global Partners Conference
- 2018 - Signed letter of intent to acquire electric vehicle control company Shanghai KADI Machinery Technology Co., Ltd
- 2018 - Signed agreement to acquire a major Chinese EMS – Shenzhen Crave Communication
- 2022 - Stock had lost more than 97% of its value

== Investors ==
- GSR Ventures
- Intel Capital
- Keystone Capital
- Norwest Venture Partners
- Qualcomm Ventures
- Pacific Securities Co., Ltd.
- The SBI & TH Venture Capital
- SK Telecom China Fund I L.P.

== See also ==
- OPhone
