= Decome =

Graphical feature in Japanese emails

NTT Docomo I-mode characters
Emojione BW 1F437

Emojione BW 1F004

Emojione BW 1F31A

Emojione BW 1F338

Decome (デコメ, Dekome; short for decoration mail) is an email feature available on Japanese mobile phone services that allows users to use an online rich-text editor so that they can include decorative images (such as emoji), animations, and backgrounds in their email messages, which are encoded as HTML emails. The feature was first created by NTT Docomo as Deco Mail (デコメール, Deco Mēru), later being adopted by other Japanese mobile phone services under different brand names. Decome is a part of Japanese mobile phone culture and was widely used in the 2000s.

== History ==
NTT Docomo first introduced Deco Mail as a feature to send emails on mobile phones with an online rich-text editor, which allowed users to customize and add decorative images, emojis, and backgrounds to their emails. The emails are encoded in and sent as HTML emails. Decome emoji are often used simply as an image or as a replacement for words. Decome emoji are 20 × 20 pixels in size. The emoji can be customized and downloaded from other websites.

The feature was later adopted by other Japanese mobile phone services under different brand names, such as Decoration Mail (Au), Decore Mail (SoftBank), and Decorative Mail (Willcom). To the public, It became colloquially known as "decoration mail," or decome for short. When NTT Docomo introduced their FOMA 906i model, users were able to embed Adobe Flash videos in their messages, known as decome-anime (デコメアニメ; lit. "decoration mail animation).

In a 2010 study, 4.3% of all emails sent by women consisted of decome emoji, while men used it in 2.0% of their emails. In 2012, social media and messaging apps became popular with decome users, particularly Line, which allow users to use stickers and emoji. Since then, decome has largely declined from the widespread adoption of smartphones and messaging apps.
