= Samsung Galaxy S II =

2011 Android smartphone by Samsung

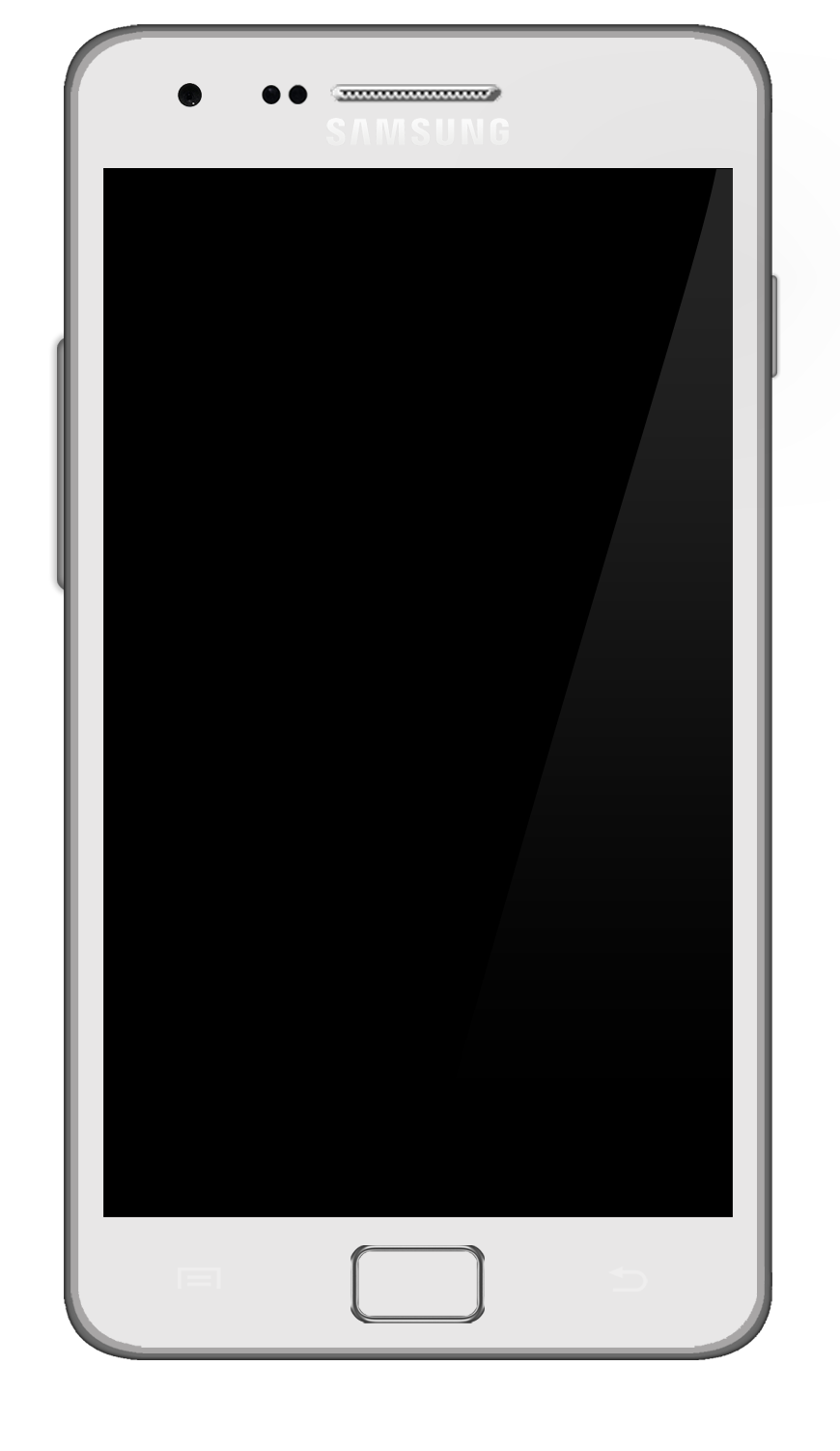
- Galaxy S II in white
- Also known as: Samsung Galaxy S2
- Brand: Samsung
- Manufacturer: Samsung Electronics
- Type: Smartphone
- Series: Galaxy S
- First released: 2 May 2011; 15 years ago
- Units sold: 40.2 million (as of 14 January 2013)
- Predecessor: Samsung Galaxy S
- Successor: Samsung Galaxy S III
- Related: Samsung Galaxy Note; Samsung Galaxy Ace; Galaxy Nexus; Samsung Infuse 4G; Samsung Focus S Samsung Galaxy R Samsung Galaxy W
- Compatible networks: Dual band CDMA2000/EV-DO Rev. A 800 and 1,900 MHz; WiMAX 2.5 to 2.7 GHz; 802.16e 2.5G (GSM/GPRS/EDGE): 850, 900, 1,800, 1,900 MHz; 3G UMTS: 850, 900, 1700 (T-Mobile USA only), 1,900, 2,100 MHz; 3.5G HSPA+: 21/42 Mbit/s; HSUPA: 5.76 Mbit/s; 4G LTE: 700/1,700 MHz (Rogers in Canada, AT&T and SK Telecom); TD-SCDMA (China Mobile)
- Form factor: Slate
- Dimensions: 125.3 mm (4.93 in) H 66.1 mm (2.60 in) W 8.49 mm (0.334 in) D (Standard); 129.8 mm (5.11 in) H 69.6 mm (2.74 in) W 9.7 mm (0.38 in) D (Sprint)
- Weight: 116 g (4.1 oz) (Standard); 130 g (4.6 oz) (Sprint)
- Operating system: All except S II Plus: Original: Android 2.3.4 "Gingerbread" with TouchWiz 4.0; Current: Android 4.1.2 "Jelly Bean" with TouchWiz Nature UX; S II Plus: Original: Android 4.1.2 "Jelly Bean" with TouchWiz Nature UX; Current: Android 4.2.2 "Jelly Bean" with TouchWiz Nature UX 2.0; Unofficial: Android 13 "Tiramisu" via LineageOS 20 by rINanDO
- System-on-chip: Samsung Exynos 4 Dual 45 nm (GT-I9100, GT-I9100T/P/M, SHW-M250S/K/L); Texas Instruments OMAP4430 (GT-I9100G); Qualcomm Snapdragon S3 APQ8060 (GT-I9210, SGH-T989); Broadcom BC28155 (GT-I9105)
- CPU: 1.2 GHz dual-core ARM Cortex-A9 (GT-I9100, GT-I9105, GT-I9100G, SHW-M250S/K/L); 1.5 GHz dual-core Qualcomm Scorpion (GT-I9210, SGH-T989)
- GPU: ARM Mali-400 MP4 (GT-I9100, SHW-M250S/K/L); PowerVR SGX540 (GT-I9100G); Qualcomm Adreno 220 (GT-I9210); VideoCore IV (GT-I9105); Vivante GC1000 Core
- Memory: 1 GB RAM
- Storage: 16 GB or 32 GB flash memory
- Removable storage: microSD (up to 32 GB SDXC)
- SIM: 1 SIM slot
- Battery: 1,650 /1,800mAh Li-ion, 3.7 V User replaceable
- Rear camera: 8 MP List: 8 Megapixel Back-illuminated sensor with auto focus; 1080p 30 fps Full HD video recording; Aperture f/2.7; LED flash
- Front camera: 2 Megapixel
- Display: 4.3 in (110 mm) Super AMOLED Plus (480×800) pixels (217 ppi) and RGB-Matrix (GT-I9100/G, GT-I9105, SHW-M250S/K/L); 4.5 in Super AMOLED Plus (480×800) pixels and RGB-Matrix (GT-I9210)
- Sound: SoundAlive 16 kHz 64 kbit/s Mono in HD Video Recording
- Connectivity: List: 3.5 mm TRRS; Wi-Fi (802.11a/b/g/n 2.4 & 5 GHz); Wi-Fi Direct; Bluetooth 3.0; micro USB 2.0; DLNA; MHL; HDMI; USB OTG Host 2.0; UMA; FM radio/T-DMB (SHW-M250S/K/L)
- Data inputs: Multi-touch capacitive touchscreen, headset controls, Proximity sensor, Ambient light sensor, 3-axis Gyroscope, Magnetometer, Accelerometer, aGPS
- Model: GT-I9100, GT-I9100T, GT-I9100P, GT-I9100M, GT-I9100/M16, GT-I9100G, GT-I9210T, SGH-I757M, SGH-I727R, SGH-I927, GT-I9210, SGH-T989D, GT-I9108, SCH-I929, ISW11SC, SC-02C, SHW-M250K, SHW-M250L, SHW-M250S, SGH-I777, SGH-I727, SPH-D710, SGH-T989, SCH-R760, GT-I9310, SGH-K603
- Codename: Slim
- SAR: Int'l version:Head: 0.16 W/kg 1 g Body: 0.96 W/kg 1 g Hotspot: 1.16 W/kg 1 g; U.S. version: 0.34 W/kg (head)
- Hearing aid compatibility: M3/T3
- Other: List: Wi-Fi hotspot, AllShare, Exchange ActiveSync, damage-resistant Gorilla Glass, oleophobic coating, Polaris Office; Online services Google Play, Samsung Apps (Social Hub, Readers Hub and Game Hub)

The Samsung Galaxy S II (also known as the Samsung Galaxy S2) was a touchscreen-enabled, slate-format Android-based smartphone developed and marketed by Samsung Electronics, as the second smartphone of the Samsung Galaxy S series. It has additional software features, expanded hardware, and a redesigned physique compared to its predecessor, the Samsung Galaxy S. The S II was launched with 2.3.3 "Gingerbread", with updates to Android 4.1.2 "Jelly Bean".

Samsung unveiled the S II on 13 February 2011 at the Mobile World Congress (MWC) in Barcelona. It was one of the slimmest smartphones of the time, mostly 8.5 mm thick, except for two small bulges which take the maximum thickness of the phone to 9.91 mm. The Galaxy S II has a 1.2 GHz dual-core "Exynos" system on a chip (SoC) processor, 1 GB of RAM, a 10.8 cm (4.3 in) WVGA Super AMOLED Plus screen display and an 8-megapixel camera with flash and 1080p full high definition video recording.

It was one of the first devices to offer a Mobile High-definition Link (MHL), which allows up to 1080p uncompressed video output to an MHL enabled TV or to an MHL to HDMI adapter, while charging the device at the same time. Also USB OTG is supported, allowing users to plug an external storage device, such as a USB flash drive or a portable hard disk drive. The user-replaceable battery gives up to ten hours of heavy usage, or two days of lighter usage. According to Samsung, the Galaxy S II is capable of providing 9 hours of talk time on 3G and 18.3 hours on 2G.

The Galaxy S II was popular and a huge success at its time that it both critically and commercially, sold 3 million units within its first 55 days on the market. It was succeeded by the Galaxy S III in May 2012.

The S II currently has the largest (unofficial) number of known Android releases, shipping with Android 2.3.4 [codename GINGERBREAD] and being unofficially upgradable to Android 16.

== Release ==
The Galaxy S II was given worldwide release dates starting from May 2011, by more than 140 vendors in some 120 countries. On 9 May 2011, Samsung announced that they had received pre-orders for 3 million Galaxy S II units globally.

Some time after the device's release, Samsung also released a variation of the phone known as the Galaxy R, which uses a Nvidia Tegra 2 chipset. Another variant of the S II, called the Galaxy S II Touch Epic, was announced in August 2011 and was released on September that same year. The phone was available via Sprint, and has a bigger capacity battery than the original S II. It was heavier than the original S II, at 130g.

Samsung also reportedly donated Galaxy S IIs to several developers of the custom Android distribution CyanogenMod (particularly those who had maintained its ports for the Galaxy S with an intent for them to port CyanogenMod 7 to the device).

== Features ==
=== Software and services ===
The Galaxy S II was launched with Android 2.3 "Gingerbread". American variants began shipments with the slightly updated version 2.3.5[ codename GINGERBREAD] installed. Version 2.3.6 was made globally available on 12 December 2011. On 13 March 2012, Samsung began to roll out upgrades to Android 4.0.3 "Ice Cream Sandwich" through their phone management software KIES to users in South Korea, Hungary, Poland and Sweden. Russian users received the update on 5 July 2012, while the rest of Europe received it on 1 August 2012. In February 2013, Samsung began rolling out an update to Android 4.1.2 "Jelly Bean" for the device.

The S II employs the TouchWiz 4.0 user interface, following the same principle as TouchWiz 3.0 found on the Galaxy S, with new improvements, such as hardware acceleration. It also has an optional gesture-based interaction called "motion" which (among other things) allows users to zoom in and out by placing two fingers on the screen and tilting the device towards and away from themselves to zoom in and out respectively. This gesture function works on both the web browser and the images in gallery used within this device. "Panning" on TouchWiz 4.0 allows the movement of widgets and icons shortcuts between screens, by allowing the device to be held and moved from side to side to scroll through home screens. This gesture-based management of widgets is a new optional method next to the existing method of holding and swiping between home screens. The Android 4.1 update backports the TouchWiz Nature interface and other features from the Galaxy S III, such as Direct Call, Pop-up Play, Smart Stay, and Easy Mode.

Four new Samsung Hub applications were revealed at the 2011 MWC: Social Hub, which integrates popular social networking services into one place rather than in separate applications, Readers Hub, providing the ability to access, read and download online newspapers, ebooks and magazines from a worldwide selection, Music Hub (in partnership with 7digital,) an application store for downloading and purchasing music tracks on the device, and Game Hub (in partnership with Gameloft,) an application store for downloading and purchasing games. Additional applications include Kies 2.0, Kies Air, AllShare (for DLNA), Voice Recognition, Google Voice Translation, Google Maps with Latitude, Places, Navigation and Lost Phone Management, Adobe Flash 16.7, QuickOffice application and 'QuickType' by Swype.

Before launch, it was announced that Samsung had taken steps to incorporate Enterprise software for business users, which included On Device Encryption, Cisco’s AnyConnect VPN, device management, Cisco WebEx, Juniper, and secure remote device management from Sybase.

The Galaxy S II comes with support for many multimedia file formats and codecs. For audio it supports FLAC, WAV, Vorbis, MP3, AAC, AAC+, eAAC+, WMA, AMR-NB, AMR-WB, MID, AC3, XMF. For video formats and codecs it supports MPEG-4, H.264, H.263, DivX HD/XviD, VC-1, 3GP (MPEG-4), WMV (ASF) as well as AVI (DivX)), MKV, FLV and the Sorenson codec. For H.264 playback, the device natively supports 8-bit encodes along with up to 1080p HD video playback.

Unofficially, the Galaxy S II can run Android 16, which is the last version of Android to support the ARMv7 architecture. |-mAh requerided: 800mAh or 800+mAh

=== Hardware and design ===
==== Chipsets ====
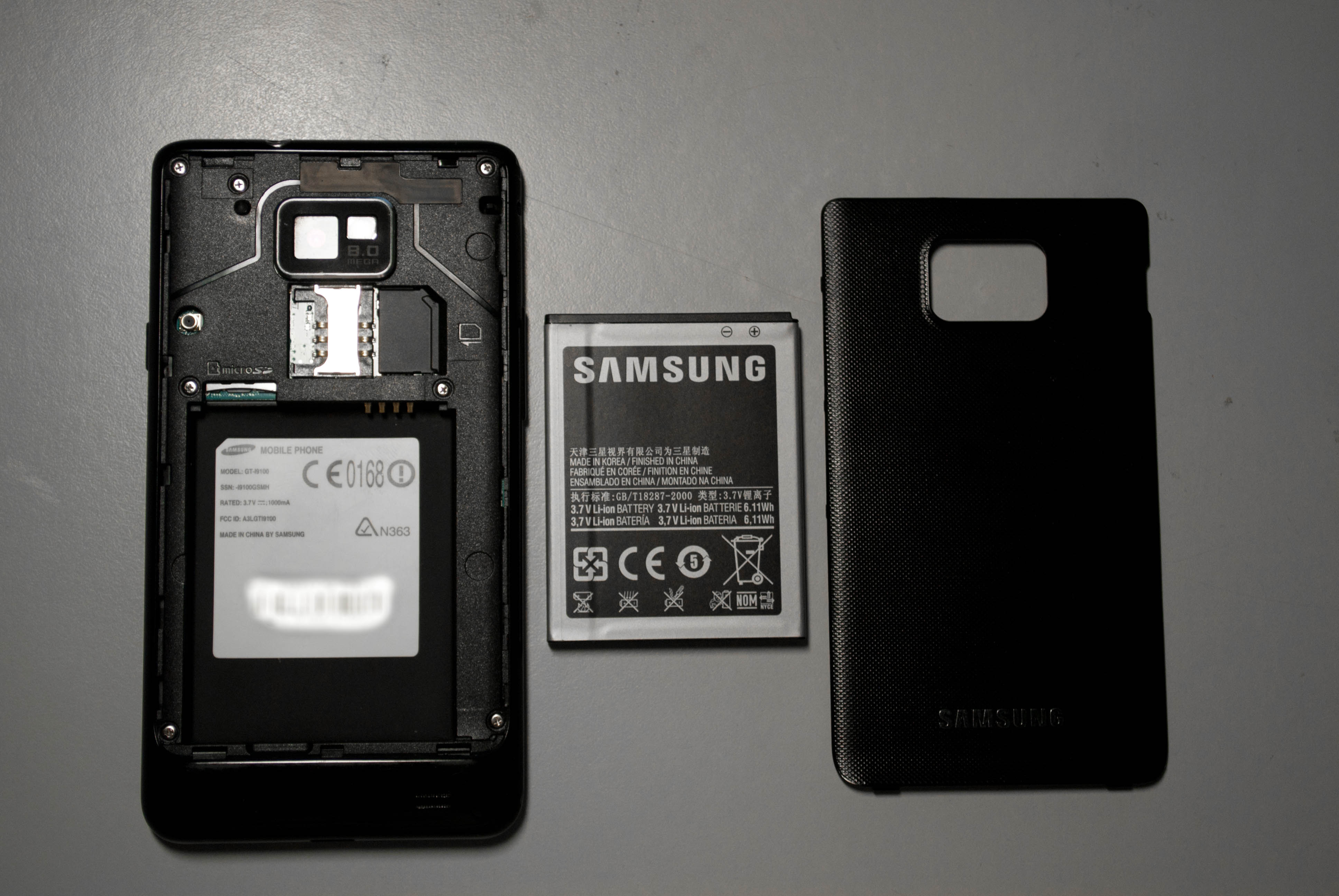
A Galaxy S II in black, from left to right components include the handset, battery and back cover

The Galaxy S II has a 1.2 GHz dual core ARM Cortex-A9 processor that uses Samsung's own 'Exynos 4210' System on a chip (SoC) that was previously code-named "Orion". The Exynos branded SoC was the source of much speculation concerning another branded successor to the previous "Hummingbird" single-core SoC of the Galaxy S. The Exynos 4 Dual 45 nm (previously Exynos 4210) uses ARM's Mali-400 MP GPU. This graphics GPU, supplied by ARM, is a move away from the PowerVR GPU of the Galaxy S.

The Exynos 4210 supports ARM's SIMD engine (also known as Media Processing Engine, or 'NEON' instructions), and may give a significant performance advantage in critical performance situations such as accelerated decoding for many multimedia codecs and formats (e.g., On2's VP6/7/8 or Real formats).

The Mali 400 GPU in the Exynos 4210 SoC is one of the only, if not the only GPU powering Android devices, that does not support GL_RGB Framebuffer Objects (FBOs), only GL_RGBA. A revised Galaxy S II (GT-9100G), based on the PowerVR SGX540, does not exhibit the issue.

At the 2011 Game Developers Conference ARM's representatives demonstrated 60 Hz framerate playback in stereoscopic 3D running on the same Mali-400 MP and Exynos SoC. They said that an increased framerate of 70 Hz would be possible through the use of an HDMI 1.4 port.

The Motorola Atrix advertised in June 2011 that it was "the world's most powerful smartphone"; in August 2011 the UK Advertising Standards Authority ruled that the Atrix was not as powerful as Galaxy S II due to its faster processor.

A newer Galaxy S II variant (GT-I9100G) uses a 1.2 GHz dual core TI OMAP 4430 processor with PowerVR SGX540 graphics.

==== Storage and RAM ====
The Galaxy S II has 1 GB of dedicated RAM and up to 32 GB of internal mass storage in the most expensive model. Within the battery compartment there is an external microSD card slot capable of recognizing and using a 32 GB microSDHC memory card.

==== Display ====
The Galaxy S II uses a 108.5-millimetre (4.27 in) WVGA (800 x 480) Super AMOLED Plus capacitive touchscreen that is covered by Gorilla Glass with an oleophobic fingerprint-resistant coating. The display is an upgrade of its predecessor, and the "Plus" signifies that the display panel has done away with PenTile matrix to regular RGB matrix display which results in a 50% increase in sub-pixels. This translates to grain reduction and sharper images and text. In addition, Samsung has claimed that Super AMOLED Plus displays are 18% more power efficient than the older Super AMOLED displays. Some phones have display issues, with a few users reporting a "yellow tint" on the left bottom edge of the display when a neutral grey background is displayed.

==== Audio ====
The Galaxy S II uses Yamaha audio hardware. The Galaxy S II's predecessor, the original Galaxy S, used Wolfson's WM8994 DAC. User feedback on Internet forums as well as an in-depth review at Clove, have expressed the Yamaha chip's inferior sound quality compared to that of the Wolfson chip featured in the original Galaxy S.

==== Camera ====
On the back of the device is an 8-megapixel Back-illuminated sensor camera with single-LED flash that can record videos in full high-definition 1080p at 30 frames per second.

It is the first mobile phone by Samsung that is able to record videos in full high-definition (FullHD 1080p).

There is also a fixed focus front-facing 2-megapixel camera for video calling, taking photos as well as general video recording, with a maximum resolution of 640x480 (VGA).

==== Near-field communication ====
The Galaxy S II is one of the earliest Android devices to natively support Near-field communication (NFC). This follows on from the Google Nexus S which was the first de facto NFC smartphone device. Reportedly the UK version was supplied without an NFC chip at the beginning of its production run, with an NFC-equipped version released later in 2011.

==== Mobile high-definition link ====
Samsung has also included a new high-definition connection technology called Mobile High-definition Link (MHL). The main specialty of MHL is that it is optimized for mobile devices by allowing the device's battery to be charged while at the same time playing back multimedia content. For the Galaxy S II, the industry standard micro USB Type-B port found on the bottom of the device can be used with an MHL connector for a TV out connection to an external display, such as a high definition television.

==== USB on-the-go ====
The micro USB port on this device also supports USB OTG standard which means the Galaxy S II can act as a 'host' device in the same way as a desktop computer, allowing external USB devices to be plugged in and used. These external USB devices typically include USB flash drives and separately powered external hard drives. A video demonstration on YouTube has shown the OTG function to be readily available with an ordinary micro USB (B-type) OTG adaptor. The same YouTube video goes on to mention a successful test completed on a 2 TB USB external hard drive (requiring own power source) but however reports of failure when trying to connect USB keyboards, tested USB mice and tested USB game pads. Officially the Galaxy S II supports the FAT16 and FAT32 file systems for OTG storage devices.

==== Headphone plug ====
A 3.5 mm TRRS headset jack is available and is located on the top side of the device. The micro USB connection port is located on the bottom side of the device.

==== Connectivity ====
The phone uses the CC3920, 67783, and 3392910 ICs. Phones released to the US market lack the FM receiver. The Broadcom BCM4330 chip supports Wi-Fi Direct that enables devices to communicate directly with one another without having to interact with an access point. Although the BCM4330 chip supports Bluetooth 4.0, the Galaxy S2 is limited to Bluetooth 3.0 using Android 4.1.2. Bluetooth 4.0 support has been introduced in Android 4.3 versions, however the upgrade to an alternative firmware is required.

Additional accessories available include:

- Dock connector for battery charging and audio-visual output
- MHL cable which makes use of the device's micro USB port for HDMI output
- USB OTG adaptor for use with external USB devices such as USB flash drives.
- Stylus pen for use on the device's capacitive screen. Support for a stylus on the Galaxy S II was a precursor to the Galaxy Note.
- A number of case manufacturers have released a variety of cases for the Galaxy S II.
- A Samsung branded Bluetooth headset for making phone calls.
- A pair of portable speakers powered by the phone's USB port.
- A vehicle mounting kit for dashboard placement of the phone, allows GPS navigation using the phone.

== Variants ==
=== Galaxy S II – Model GT-I9100G ===
The GT-9100G was released in late 2011, and is usually sold instead of the original GT-I9100 in certain markets (mostly Asia and some parts of Europe). An overview of the Galaxy S II GT-I9100G can be seen on Samsung's official website. It features a Texas Instruments OMAP4430 SoC instead of the Exynos 4210 in the GT-I9100. It is visually identical to the GT-I9100, as well as having the same 1.2 GHz processor speed and dual-core ARM Cortex A9 processor technology. However, the SoC is of a different design and the Mali-400 GPU has been replaced by a PowerVR SGX 540 GPU. This difference in the SoC makes this variant incompatible with custom ROMs intended for the I9100, but it has been steadily gaining its own aftermarket support (such as from CyanogenMod) due to the relative ease of development and the openness of the TI OMAP platform.

=== Australia ===
==== Telstra and Vodafone Australia – Models GT-I9100T ====
The Galaxy S II (Model GT-I9100T) sold by Telstra, Vodafone Australia and some certain other carriers outside Australia is virtually identical to the I9100 and is functionally equivalent.

==== Telstra and Optus – Model GT-I9210T ====
In Australia the Galaxy S II 4G (Model GT-I9210T) uses a Qualcomm processor and supports Telstra's and Optus' 4G networks. However, analog radio and digital media are not supported.

=== Canada ===
==== Bell Mobility – Models GT-I9100M and SGH-I757M ====
Bell's Galaxy S II is identical to the international version, except that its model number is GT-I9100M. All custom ROMs running on I9100 international versions can be flashed to the I9100M.

Bell's Galaxy S II HD LTE (Model SGH-I757M) is identical to the cancelled AT&T Skyrocket HD hence making the device another variant of the South Korean model of the Galaxy S II HD LTE. One difference between the South Korean model and the Bell Mobility model is the lack of a physical home button, instead, four capacitive buttons are used, one of which directly replaces the physical home button. The specification of the device is identical to the South Korean model. However, different frequencies bands are enabled on this device.

==== Rogers – Models SGH-I727R and SGH-I927 ====
The Rogers Galaxy S II LTE (Model SGH-I727R) is identical to the AT&T Skyrocket, and features a larger screen 4.52", a bigger battery 1,850 mAh, and a different 1.5 GHz Qualcomm processor.

Rogers' Galaxy S Glide (Model SGH-I927) is the same phone with the same specs as the AT&T's Captivate Glide, except the carrier logo is on the back instead of behind the front glass panel.

Rogers launched the Galaxy S II LTE in fall 2011, soon after its LTE launch in Toronto.

Note that the Galaxy S II LTE has a different model number: I9210 and came out later and only in select markets, including Canada and South Korea.

==== Telus Mobility – Model SGH-T989D ====
Telus Mobility's 4G Galaxy S II X (Model SGH-T989D) is identical hardware-wise to the T-Mobile SGH-T989, including the Qualcomm 1.5 GHz dual core processor, larger 4.52 inch screen and 1,850 mAh battery. Although utilizing a different modem firmware, most custom ROMs running on T-Mobile versions can be flashed to the Telus T989D.

The design differs from both the Rogers/International and Bell/AT&T models. There is a chrome band around the edge and the plastic on the back has a leathery feel. Instead of the hardware home button, it has the standard four capacitive buttons. The Qualcomm processor allows for 42 Mbit/s HSPA+ download speeds that the Samsung Exynos processor is not currently capable of. It was released on 28 October 2011. A subsidiary of Telus, Koodo Mobile, also offers the SGH-T989D.

=== China ===
==== China – Model GT-I9108 (China Mobile), GT-I9100G, SCH-I929 ====
The Galaxy S II (Model GT-I9108) was released in late 2011, and it is sold in China by China Mobile. It is identical to the GT-I9100G, featuring the same Texas Instruments OMAP4430 SoC with a 1.2 GHz dual-core ARM Cortex A9 processor and PowerVR SGX 540 graphics processor. However, the GT-I9108 has TD-SCDMA support in place of WCDMA support found in other variants. The GT-I9108 is a regional model and has few available custom ROMs.

The Galaxy S II (Model SCH-I929) was released in late 2011, and it is sold in China by China Telecom. It is based on the design of Galaxy S II LTE (GT-I9210), but supports CDMA2000 1x EVDO for use with the carrier.

=== Europe – Model GT-I9100P ===
The Galaxy S II (Model GT-I9100P) was released in late 2011. It has the same hardware as GT-I9100 plus the NFC chip and battery (the battery is specific because it includes the antenna). To keep NFC enabled it is necessary to update the firmware using a P version. Any I9100 firmware can be used, but doing so will disable the NFC hardware.

=== India ===
==== Model: GT-i9100 ====
GT-I9100 is a SIM-free model released on 2 May 2011. This model supports 2G/3G only, and a microSDHC card with a capacity of up to 32 GB.

=== Japan ===
==== KDDI au – Model: ISW11SC ====
The KDDI au Galaxy S II WiMAX (Model: ISW11SC) was first released on 20 January 2012 in the color Noble Black and was followed by a Ceramics White model on 24 March 2012 and a Shiny Magenta model on 20 July 2012. The ISW11SC currently runs Android 4.0.4 via an OTA update from the original 2.3.6 firmware. The ISW11SC uses the Samsung Exynos 4210 dual-core 1.4 GHz main CPU and a Qualcomm QSC6085 Modem chipset running at 192 MHz. It features 1 GB of RAM and 16 GB of ROM (11 GB available for user data storage) with support for up to 64 GB additional storage via the internal microSD slot. An 1850mAh battery powers the device. The ISW11SC features a Samsung SUPER AMOLED HD 1280x720 screen measuring 4.7 inches. Connectivity includes CDMA 800 MHz/2,100 MHz; 3G EV-DO Rev A; 2.4 GHz / 5 GHz 802.11 a/b/g/n Wi-Fi; Bluetooth 3.0 and an integrated WiMAX modem with speeds up to 40 Mbit/s down and 15.4 Mbit/s up. Like most Japanese domestic model phones the ISW11SC includes many Japan-specific applications. This phone features NFC functionality which is technically compatible with FeliCa RFID (such as with PASMO and SUICA payment systems) however, the software doesn't support the Japanese "Osaifu Keitai" mobile wallet and thus the phone cannot be used to make transactions with NFC in Japan.

==== NTT DoCoMo – Model SC-02C ====
NTT DoCoMo introduced a variant of the Galaxy S II (Model SC-02C) on 23 June 2011 as the successor to the DoCoMo Galaxy S (Model SC-02B). The SC-02C includes 1seg terrestrial television support, as well as i-mode software functions specific to DoCoMo handsets, such as i-channel, BeeTV, MelodyCall and DoCoMo map navigation. The SC-02C is powered by the Samsung Exynos 4210 Orion Dual-core 1.2 GHz (S5PC210) processor. The SC-02C uses the Wnn Japanese input system.

==== NTT DoCoMo – Model SC-03D ====
NTT DoCoMo also announced the SC-03D model on 18 October 2011 and released on 24 November 2011 as a successor to the SC-02C Galaxy II. This also included a 3.9G network system (Xi). It uses the same connectivity features, but uses a dual-core Qualcomm APQ8060 processor clocking at 1.5 GHz. The "Ceramic White" variant also was released on 21 January 2012.

=== South Korea ===
All of variants optimized for use with South Korean wireless carriers have Samsung's Korean input system for feature phones, a Dubeolsik-layout virtual keyboard and a T-DMB tuner in place of an FM radio tuner.

==== KT – Model SHW-M250K ====
The KT variant, the Galaxy S II KT (Model SHW-M250K) uses KT's Wi-Fi CM instead of Android's Wi-Fi CM to connect to Wi-Fi networks. Additional features for KT users are installed by default.

==== LG U+ – Model SHW-M250L ====
Instead of WCDMA and HSPA, LG U+'s variant of the Galaxy S II (Model SHW-M250L) uses EV-DO Rev.B (KPCS 1.8 GHz) to accommodate the network technology deployed by LG U+. The SHW-M250L is slightly thicker (9.4 mm) than SK Telecom and KT variants (8.89 mm). Additional features for LG U+ users are installed by default.

==== SK Telecom – Model SHW-M250S ====
The SK Telecom variant of the Galaxy S II (Model SHW-M250S) uses the SK-MMS system instead of the OMA-MMS system for multimedia messaging. Additional features for SK Telecom users are installed by default.

=== United States ===
==== AT&T – Models SGH-I777, SGH-I727 and SGH-I927 ====
AT&T Mobility began offering its first variant of the Galaxy S II (Model SGH-I777) on 2 October 2011. Prior to its release, AT&T Mobility's first variant of the device was code named "Attain" by Samsung.

The AT&T Mobility variant maintains the 4.3 inch display of the international version, but features four capacitive buttons. It also includes NFC capability.

AT&T Mobility introduced a second variant of the device called the Galaxy S II Skyrocket (Model SGH-I727) on 6 November 2011. Prior to its release, this second variant was code named "Skyrocket" by Samsung. This variant is similar to the international Galaxy S II LTE and is notable for its inclusion of an LTE radio. The inclusion of the LTE radio required changing the device's main processor from the Exynos to the Qualcomm Snapdragon MSM8660 because the Exynos does not support LTE. This version features the same 4.52 inch screen of the Sprint model. This variant supports Near Field Communications (NFC).

AT&T Mobility introduced a third variant called the Captivate Glide (Model SGH-I927) on 20 November 2011. The Captivate Glide differs from the other two AT&T Mobility variants primarily by the inclusion of a slide-out, physical QWERTY keyboard. The Captivate Glide also includes a dual-core, 1 GHz Tegra 2 dual-core processor instead of a 1.2 GHz Exynos processor. The display of this third variant is Super AMOLED instead of Super AMOLED Plus and the display size is reduced to 4 inches.

==== Sprint – Model SPH-D710 ====
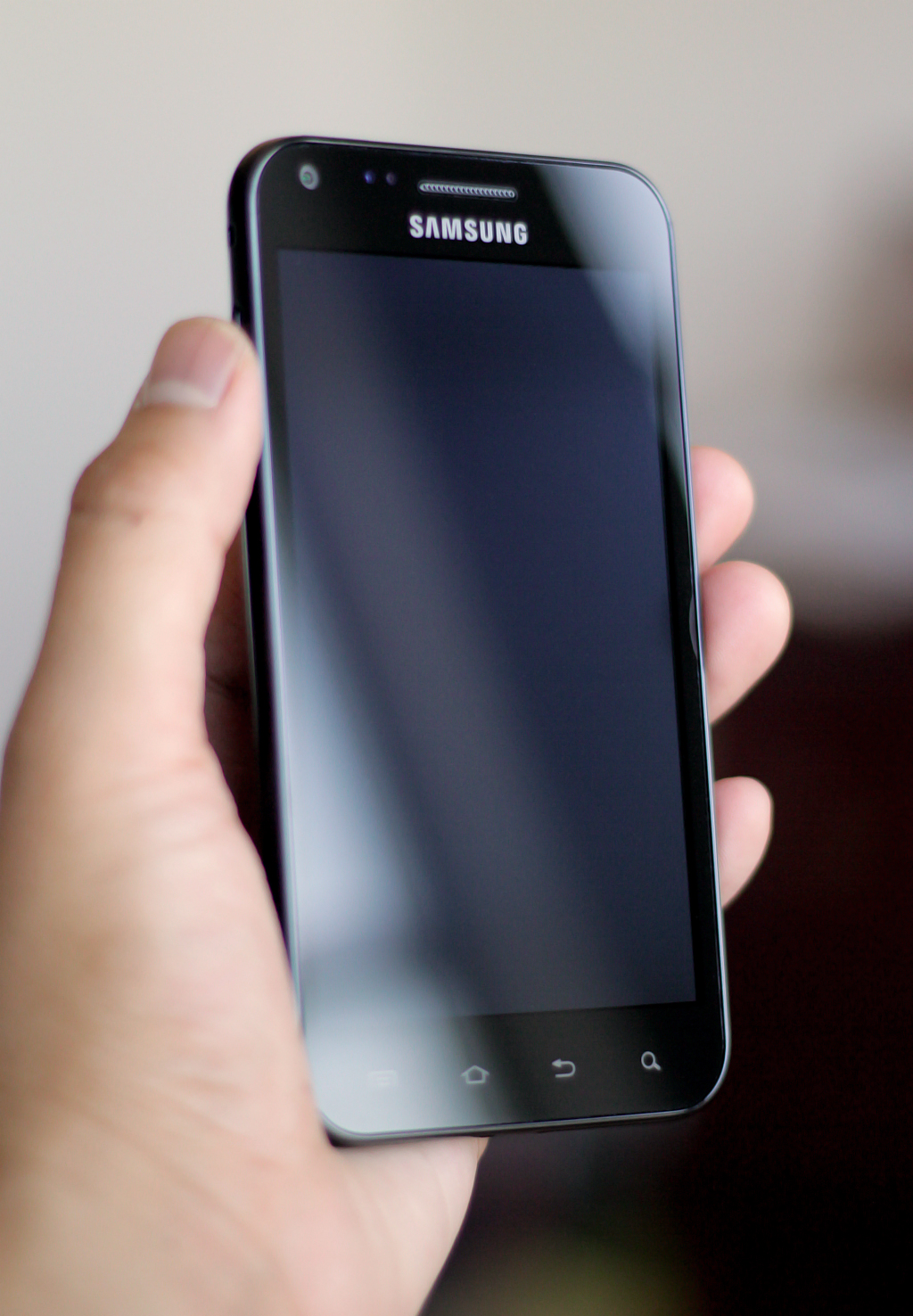
Sprint's Galaxy S II Epic 4G Touch (Model SPH-D710)

The Sprint variant (Model SPH-D710) of the Galaxy S II was initially released as the Galaxy S II Epic 4G Touch and was later renamed to the simpler Galaxy S II 4G. Prior to its release, Sprint's variant was codenamed "Within" by Samsung. The SPH-D710 first became available for Sprint customers on 16 September 2011, making Sprint the first carrier in the United States to offer a variant of the S II. The SPH-D710 is available to Sprint customers in black, titanium grey or white.

The Sprint variant has key differences from the "International" version of the Galaxy S II. The Sprint variant includes a 2500 MHz WiMax radio. The display of the Sprint variant, at 4.52 inches, is larger than that of the international version. The Sprint variant features four touch-capacitive buttons as opposed to the three-button hardware/capacitive combination found on the international version. Other differences include an LED notification light and a larger, 6.66 Wh battery.

The Sprint variant does not come equipped with NFC capability, unlike the variants offered by T-Mobile US and AT&T Mobility.

The Galaxy S II is a touchscreen-only device, unlike the Epic 4G, which includes a physical QWERTY keyboard.

On 28 March 2013, the Android 4.1.2 Jelly Bean (GB27) update was released through the Samsung Kies software As of February 2014, there are no additional confirmed updates for this device.

The device has received 7 updates from Samsung since its original release on 16 September 2011.

Sprint has announced that on 6 November 2015 the Sprint WiMAX network will be decommissioned effectively removing 4G capabilities on the SPH-D710 model. Users had access to mobile broadband using 3G until March 31, 2022 when Sprint's 3G CDMA network was shut down.

===== Boost Mobile and Virgin Mobile USA =====
Sprint subsidiaries Boost Mobile offers a Sprint SPH-D710 variant of the Galaxy S II 4G in both titanium grey or white options. Virgin Mobile offers a variant, model i9210, for their service.

Boost Mobile began the Galaxy S II 4G on 6 September 2012 for $369.99. Virgin Mobile USA began offering the Galaxy S II 4G on 15 November 2012 for $369.99.

In March 2013, the Boost Mobile and Virgin Mobile variants were also updated along with Sprint's to Android 4.1.2 Jelly Bean.

==== T-Mobile – Model SGH-T989 ====
T-Mobile USA began taking pre-orders for its variant (Model SGH-T989) of the Galaxy S II on 11 October 2011 and began selling it in stores on 12 October 2011. Prior to its release, T-Mobile's variant of the device was code named "Hercules" by Samsung.

The T-Mobile variant has important key differences from the "International" version of the Galaxy S II. The T-Mobile variant uses a 1.5 GHz dual-core Qualcomm APQ8060 (S3) Snapdragon processor, as opposed to the 1.2 GHz dual-core Exynos processor of the International version because the Exynos processor is not compatible with T-Mobile's 42 Mbit/s HSPA+ network. The cellular radio of the T-Mobile supports UMTS bands I (2100 MHz), II (1900 MHz), IV (1700 MHz) and V (850 MHz). The display of the T-Mobile variant, at 4.52 inches, is larger than that of the international version. The T-Mobile variant features four touch-capacitive buttons as opposed to the three-button hardware/capacitive combination found on the international version, this variant of the smartphone uses the powerful Adreno-220 series GPU and supports up to version 4.4.4–based ROMs of the Android OS The T-Mobile variant, like the AT&T variant, supports Near Field Communications (NFC) integrated in the battery, which has 6.85Wh capacity.

As of 8 March 2013, the T-Mobile variant can be updated to Android 4.1.2 "Jelly Bean" using Samsung Kies.

==== U.S. Cellular – Model SCH-R760 ====
U.S. Cellular's variant (Model SCH-R760) is equivalent to the Sprint variant, except for one specification; the U.S. Cellular variant does not include a 2500 MHz WiMax radio.

== Galaxy S II Plus ==
The Galaxy S II Plus (model GT-I9105/P) was announced in CES 2013. The phone has a Broadcom BCM28155 SoC with a 1.2 GHz dual-core processor and a VideoCore IV HW GPU instead of the Mali 400MP in the original Galaxy S II. Both the original and the "Plus" have 1 GB of RAM, but the latter only has 8 GB of internal storage, half that of the original, of which the operating system takes a significant cut. It uses a hyperglazed plastic body (the same as the Galaxy S III) and is available in Chic White and Dark Blue. The phone originally ran on Android 4.1.2 "Jelly Bean" with Samsung's TouchWiz Nature UX. An update to Android 4.2.2 was made available. Also released was a I9105P model, which supports NFC.

== Reception ==
Reviews of the Galaxy S II have been universally positive. It was honored by MWC's Global Mobile Awards as "SmartPhone Of The Year 2012" Engadget gave the device a 9/10, calling it "the best Android smartphone yet" and "possibly the best smartphone, period." CNET UK gave the device a favorable review of 4.5/5 and described it as "one of the slimmest, lightest mobiles we've ever had the privilege to hold." TechRadar gave the device 5/5 stars and describes the device as one that "set a new bar for smartphones in 2011." Pocketnow was "impressed" with the speed of the web browser. SlashGear states that the device "sets the benchmark for smartphones in general." GSMArena points out minor drawbacks such as an "all-plastic body" and the handset having "no dedicated camera key," but still calls the handset "absurdly powerful" and concluding "we just cannot see beyond the new Samsung flagship if we're to name the ultimate smartphone."

After slightly over one month since its debut, more than 1 million units of Galaxy S II were activated in South Korea. Worldwide, 3 million units were sold in 55 days. 85 days after its first release, Samsung declared global shipments of over 5 million for the Galaxy S II and 10 million after 5 months. Partially owing to strong sales of Samsung's Galaxy range of smartphones, Samsung overtook Apple in smartphone sales during Q3 2011, with a total market share of 23.8%, compared to Apple's 14.6%. In Q2 2012, Samsung also became the world's largest maker of mobile phones, dethroning Nokia.

== Successor ==
The successor to the Galaxy S II was the Galaxy S III, unveiled in London on 3 May 2012 and commencing sales on 29 May 2012 with 10 million reported pre-orders.

== See also ==
- Comparison of Samsung Galaxy S smartphones
- Samsung Galaxy S series

Preceded by Samsung Galaxy S	Samsung Galaxy S II; 2011	Succeeded by Samsung Galaxy S III
