= Android Beam =

Former Android OS feature

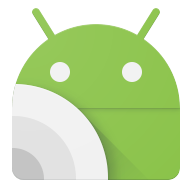

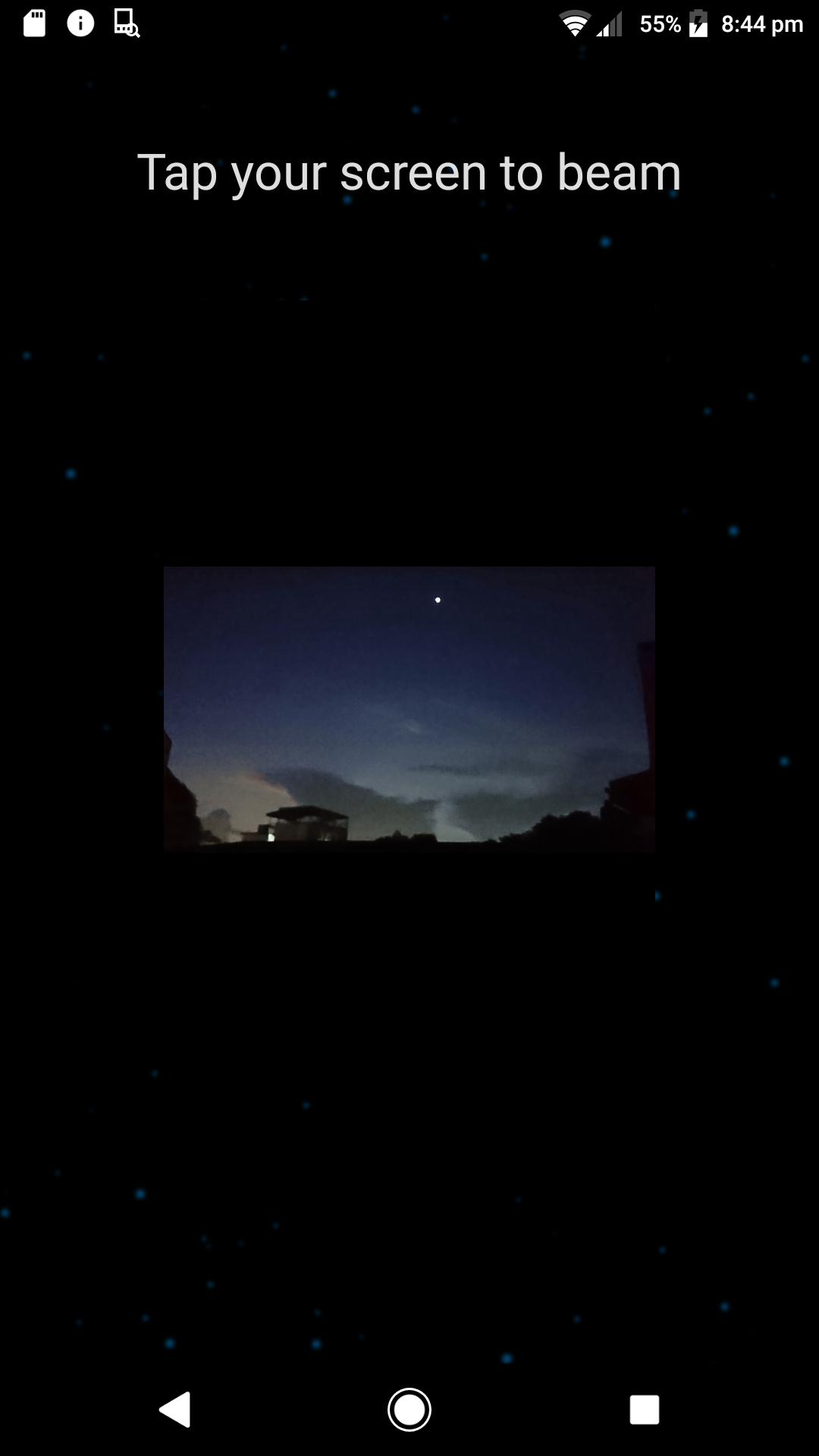
- Screenshot of Android Beam running on Android Oreo
- Developer: Google
- Release: 2011; 15 years ago
- Operating system: Android OS
- Successor: Nearby Share
- Service name: File sharing
- Type: Utility software
- License: Apache License 2.0

Android Beam is a discontinued feature of the Android mobile operating system that allowed data to be transferred via near field communication (NFC). It allowed the rapid short-range exchange of web bookmarks, contact info, directions, YouTube videos, and other data. Android Beam was introduced in 2011 with Android Ice Cream Sandwich. This was improved after Google acquired Bump. By 2017, ComputerWorld included Android Beam in a list of "once-trumpeted features that quietly faded away", observing that "despite the admirable marketing effort, Beam never quite worked particularly well, and numerous other systems for sharing stuff proved to be simpler and more reliable."

Android Beam was deprecated starting with Android 10 in January 2019, and was removed completely in Android 14. Google replaced Android Beam with the introduction of Nearby Share, which is an AirDrop competitor by Google.

== Description ==
=== Usage ===
Android Beam is activated by placing devices back to back with the content to be shared displayed on the screen. If the content is able to be sent, the screen will shrink down and display "Tap to Beam" at the top. Tapping the screen sends the content from one device to the other. A sound will play when devices are near and able to beam. When the data has been sent, a confirmation tone will play or a negative tone will play if failed and the content will shrink off the screen indicating beaming is complete. Sharing is one direction and the device sending content will not get content from the receiving device.

=== Requirements ===
To activate Android Beam, both devices must support NFC (Near field communication) and have it enabled in addition to passing the lock-screen or logging in.

=== 4.1 Jelly Bean update ===
As of Android 4.1 Jelly Bean, devices can use Android Beam to send photos and videos over Bluetooth. Android Beam uses NFC to enable Bluetooth on both devices, instantly pair them, and disable Bluetooth once complete automatically on both devices. This only works between Android devices version 4.1 and above.

=== Application support ===
For beaming of specific content, an app is allowed to control the content being sent when adding Android Beam support. If the app does not specify data, beaming the app will open it on the receiving device. If the receiving device does not have the app, it will open the application page in the Play Store.

== S Beam ==
S Beam refers to an extension of Android Beam by Samsung, first used on their Galaxy S III phones. It uses the near-field communication to establish a Wi-Fi Direct connection between two devices for the data transfer, instead of a Bluetooth connection. This results in faster transfer speeds between devices which feature S Beam. S Beam is limited to select Samsung devices with S Beam support, such as the Samsung Galaxy S III and Samsung Galaxy S4.

== See also ==
- Quick Share
- Nearby Share
- Bump (application)
- AirDrop
