= Samsung Galaxy S III Neo =

Mobile phone model

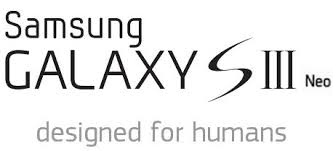

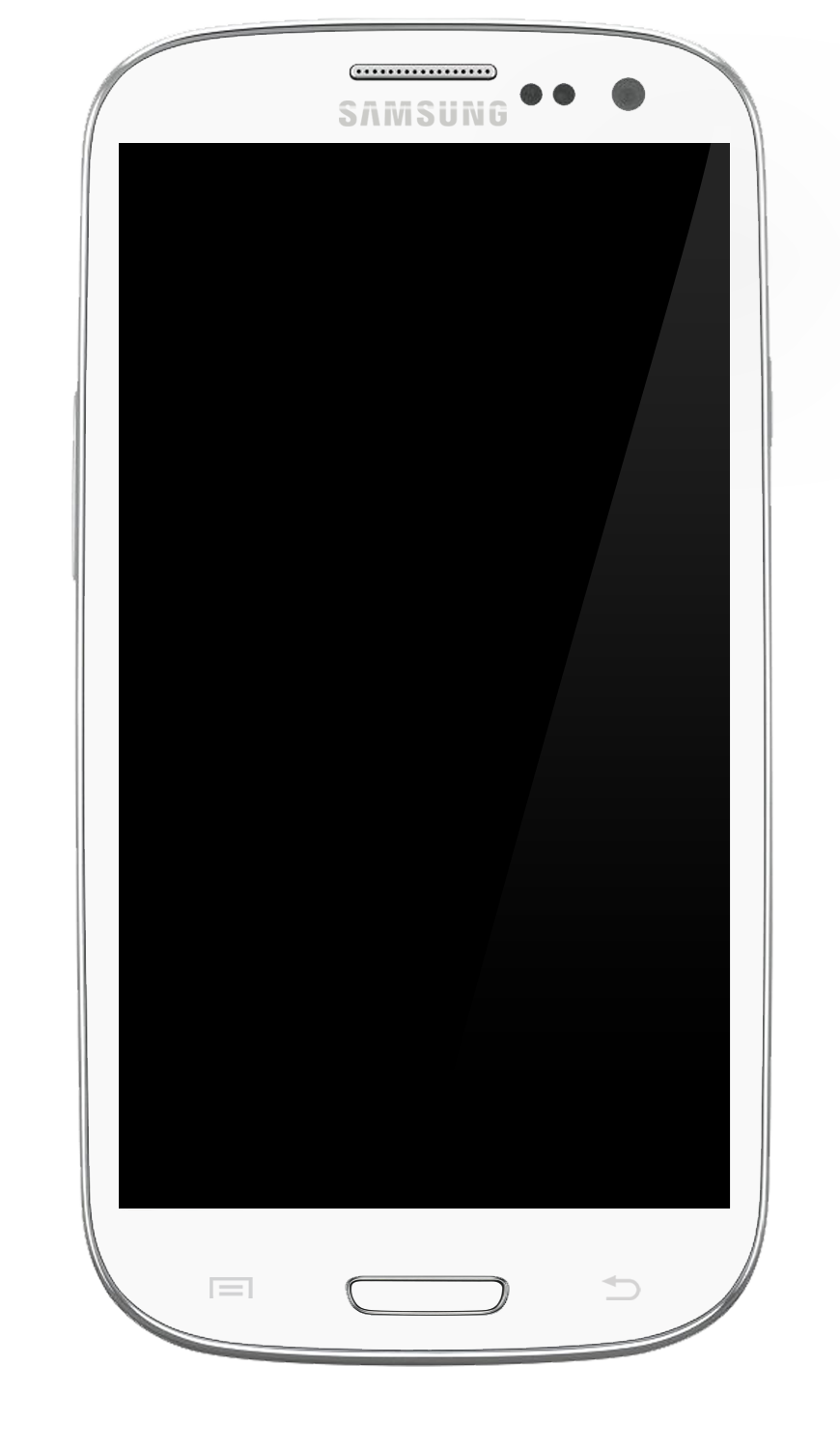
- Galaxy S III Neo in white
- Brand: Samsung
- Manufacturer: Samsung Electronics
- Type: Smartphone
- Series: Galaxy S
- Family: Samsung Galaxy
- First released: April 2014; 12 years ago
- Successor: Samsung Galaxy S5 Neo
- Related: Samsung Galaxy S III; Samsung Galaxy S III Mini; Samsung Galaxy Note II
- Compatible networks: GSM, HSPA
- Form factor: Slate
- Dimensions: 136.6 mm (5.38 in) H 70.7 mm (2.78 in) W 8.6 mm (0.34 in) D
- Weight: 132 g (4.7 oz)
- Operating system: Original: Android 4.3 Jelly Bean; Current: Android 4.4.4 "KitKat"; With TouchWiz
- System-on-chip: Qualcomm Snapdragon 400 MSM8226
- CPU: 1.4 GHz quad-core Cortex A7
- GPU: Adreno 305
- Memory: 1.5 GB RAM
- Storage: 16 GB (11.5 GB user available)
- Removable storage: microSD up to 64 GB
- Battery: Removable 2100 mAh Li-ion battery
- Rear camera: 8 MP Autofocus and LED Flash
- Front camera: 1.9 MP
- Display: 4.8 in (120 mm) HD Super AMOLED (720×1280) Display features list: 4.8 in (120 mm) diagonal with 16:9 aspect ratio widescreen; HD Super AMOLED touchscreen; 720×1280 pixels
- Connectivity: Wi-Fi, Bluetooth 4.0
- Data inputs: Inputs list: Multi-touch capacitive touchscreen; 3 push buttons; aGPS; GLONASS; Gyroscope; Accelerometer; Digital compass
- Model: I9300I or I9301I
- Website: Official website

The Samsung Galaxy S III Neo (also known as the Galaxy S3 Lite) is a lower-cost hardware revision of the Samsung Galaxy S III. It has less features than the original, lacking a scratchproof screen and only 16GB of storage.

Samsung unveiled the Galaxy S III Neo in April 2014, two years after the original Galaxy S III release date.

== Differences between S III and S III Neo ==
The original Galaxy S III does not have the same specifications as the Neo, they differ depending on the topic.

Galaxy S III vs Galaxy S III Neo comparison
Specification	Galaxy S III	Galaxy S III Neo	Difference
Network	GSM / HSPA	GSM / HSPA	Same
Release date	May 2012	April 2014	2 years newer
Weight	133 g (4.69 oz)	132 g (4.66 oz)	Slightly lighter
Inches	4.8 in	4.8 in	Same
SIM	Single SIM	Dual-SIM	Double SIM
Screen protection	Gorilla Glass 2	None	Unprotected
Stock Android	Android 4.0.4	Android 4.3	Newer Android version by default
Upgrade	Android 4.3	Android 4.4.4	Newer Android
SoC	Exynos 4412	Snapdragon 400	Different SoC
CPU	Cortex A9 1.4 GHz	Cortex A7 1.4 GHz	Two options
GPU	Mali-400 MP4	Adreno 305	Different GPU
Internal storage	16/32 GB	Only 16 GB	Only one choice
Rear camera	8 MP autofocus	8 MP autofocus	Same
Front camera	1.9 MP	1.9 MP	Same
Has barometer	Yes	No	No sensor
Battery	2100 mAh	2100 mAh	Same

== See also ==
- Samsung Galaxy S III
- Samsung Galaxy S III Mini
- Samsung Galaxy S series
