= Nearby Share =

Data transfer program by Google

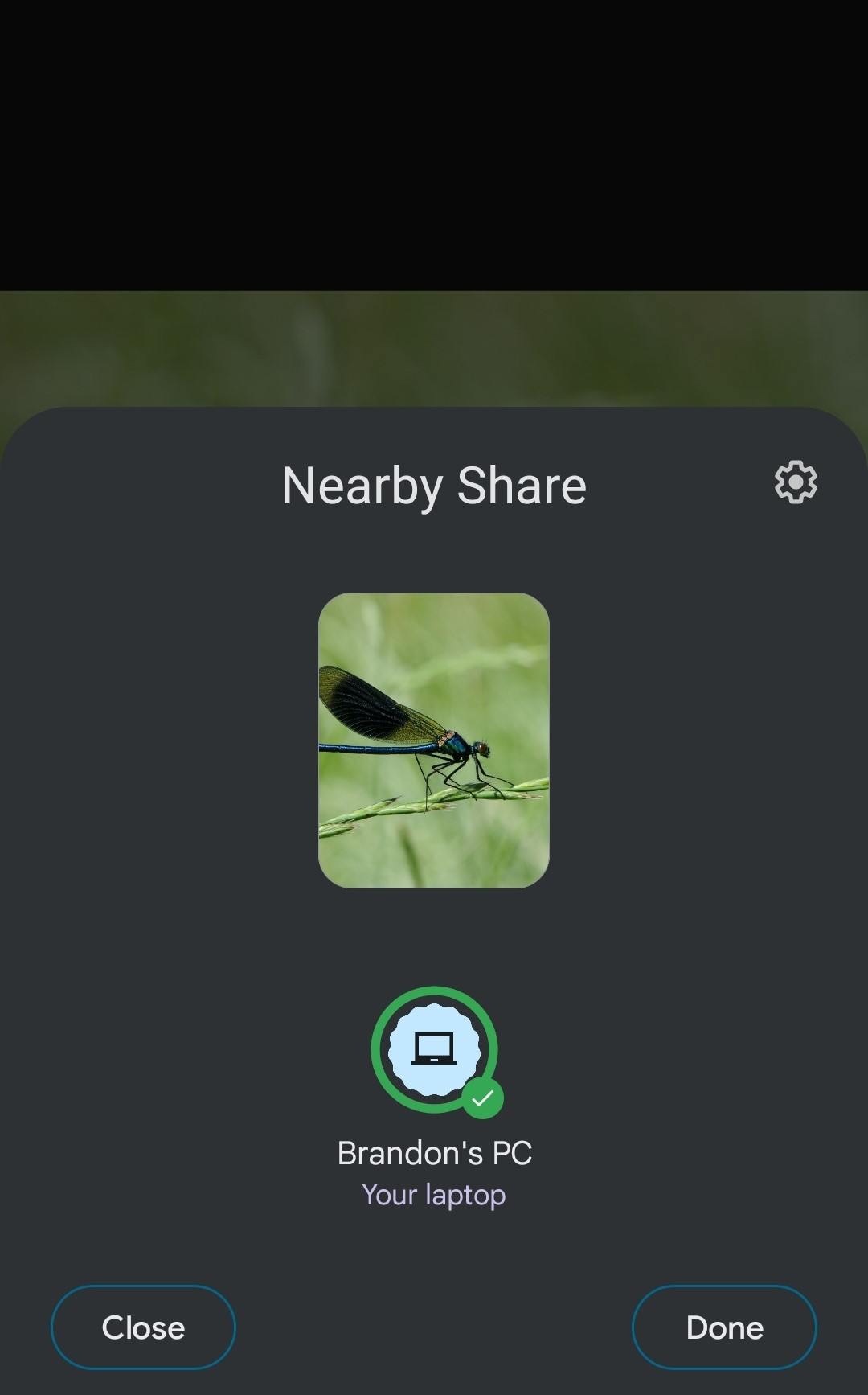
- Nearby Share running on Android after sending an image
- Developer: Google LLC
- Initial release: August 4, 2020; 5 years ago
- Operating system: Android Marshmallow and later; ChromeOS 91 and later; Windows 10 (version 2004) and later (only x86-64 version)
- Predecessor: Android Beam
- Successor: Quick Share
- Type: Utility software
- License: Proprietary

Nearby Share was a functionality developed by Google that allowed data to be transferred between devices via Bluetooth, Wi-Fi Direct or Internet. In 2024, it was merged into Samsung's Quick Share. It was available for Android, ChromeOS and Microsoft's Windows. It was first released on August 4, 2020.

Nearby Share is not to be confused with Microsoft's similarly-named "nearby sharing" feature, which is only available for PCs running Windows 10 or later and uses Microsoft's own proprietary protocol.

== History ==
Before Nearby Share, Google launched Android Beam in 2011. By 2017, ComputerWorld included Android Beam in a list of "once-trumpeted features that quietly faded away", observing that "despite the admirable marketing effort, Beam never quite worked particularly well, and numerous other systems for sharing stuff proved to be simpler and more reliable."

Nearby Share was officially released for devices running Android Marshmallow and later on August 4, 2020. The program worked much like Apple's AirDrop, allowing users to select "Nearby Share" on the share menu and then to wait for a nearby phone to appear.

In June 2021 with the rollout of ChromeOS 91, Nearby Share was released for ChromeOS with the same features and options as the Android version. During CES 2022, Google announced Nearby Share for Windows. On March 31, 2023, the beta version of the Nearby Share App was released for Windows PCs allowing cross-platform file transfers.

In January 2024, Google and Samsung announced that Nearby Share and Quick Share would merge into one unified app, under the name Quick Share.

== Usage ==
On Android and ChromeOS, Nearby Share is enabled by going to Connected Devices > Connection preferences > Nearby Share (or Google > Devices & sharing > Nearby Share) in the settings app and enabling "Use Nearby Share." On Windows, Nearby Share is downloaded from android.com. Once the setup program is done installing Nearby Share, or from the Nearby Share settings menu Android, the user will be able to choose who is able to see their device. The available options are:

- Everyone
- Contacts
- Your devices
- Hidden

When sharing a file via Nearby Share, the user will be presented with a list of available devices to share with. Choosing a device from the list sends a prompt to the recipient that requires them to confirm the transfer. When sharing amongst devices linked to the same Google Account, it is not required to wake the receiving devices or confirm the file transmission.

Nearby Share allows for the sharing of files and links, such as images, videos, text, contact info, directions, YouTube videos, and other data. It uses Bluetooth, Bluetooth Low Energy, WebRTC, and peer-to-peer Wi-Fi to share content. It can be configured to only share content offline, restricting it to Bluetooth only operation.

== Availability ==
Nearby Share is available on Android 6 and later, ChromeOS 91 and later, and Windows 10 and later. On Windows, Nearby Share must be installed manually, as opposed to its implementation on Android and ChromeOS, where it is a part of the operating system and does not need to be installed separately. Windows devices must have both Bluetooth and Wi-Fi to be able to run Nearby Share. Windows on ARM devices are not supported.

== See also ==
- AirDrop, a similar functionality by Apple
- Briar, an independent copyleft app for Android
- SHAREit, a P2P file sharing platform
- Wi-Fi Direct, a similar technology
- Zapya, proprietary file transfer over Wi-Fi app
