= Zapya =

File sharing app of China

- Screenshot of Zapya on iPhone 4S, with "File" tab selected
- Developer: DewMobile Inc.
- Operating system: Android, iOS, macOS, Windows
- Available in: Android: English; iOS: English, Simplified Chinese; Windows: English, Chinese, Persian
- Type: Utility software
- Licence: Freeware
- Website: izapya.com

Zapya and Kuai Ya (Chinese: 快牙) are peer-to-peer file sharing apps that allow users to transfer files between mobile devices without the need of an Internet connection. DewMobile, Inc. initially conceived Kuai Ya in Silicon Valley, California, USA to target the Chinese market in 2012. However, the demand for the app spread to neighboring countries such as Myanmar and Pakistan. When the international user base had grown to a reasonable size, DewMobile created a separate app known as Zapya to publish on Apple App Store and Google Play Store. While Kuai Ya and Zapya are similar to each other, they include different APK and features in order to comply with Google Play policies.

Zapya gained popularity in countries with low Internet penetration and poor Internet architecture, because it allows users to share files without relying on an Internet or cellular data connection. The app is available on multiple platforms, including lower-end phone models, so that it is accessible to everyone. Users can transfer files using a transfer method similar to Bluetooth and AirDrop. Some cellphone stores use Zapya's "Phone Replicate" feature to transfer the data from their customers' old phones to their new ones.

== Impact ==
Zapya has become ingrained in Cuban youth culture due to limited Wi-Fi access in Cuba. The Miami Herald reported on 11 July 2015 on how Cuban tech start-ups use Zapya to overcome the lack of internet penetration and poor Internet architecture in Cuba. They also found that the youth of Cuba use Zapya as a free platform to talk to their friends and share funny videos and photos.

The popularity of Zapya in Cuba has only grown stronger over the years to the point that Cubans have coined the verb "zapyar" as a slang term to refer to sharing files. Cachivache Media deemed Zapya as "the network for the disconnected" in 2016. Travelers and students planning to study abroad in Cuba are recommended to download Zapya before going to the country.

== Controversies ==
=== Temporary removal from Google Play Store ===
For a week in October 2019, Zapya was removed from Google Play Store and labeled as "harming other applications". It was determined that a third party software development kit (SDK) had been deemed harmful by the Google Play Policy team. Any app that used this SDK were also deemed harmful. The SDK was promptly removed. Dewmobile issued a formal apology to users on 5 October 2019 and urged them to update to the new version that complied with Google Play policies.

=== Provisional ban in China ===
Even though Kuai Ya complies with Chinese censorship restrictions, both it and Zapya are banned in the Chinese autonomous region of Xinjiang. In November 2019, the leaked China Cables revealed that the Chinese government's mass surveillance and predictive-policing program Integrated Joint Operation Platform (IJOP) had flagged 1.8 million users with Zapya and Kuai Ya on their phones for investigation as part of the crackdown on Uyghur Muslims. It is not known when the ban came into effect but recently, travelers and residents who are found with either app downloaded to their phones are forced to uninstall them. Apps such as YouTube, Facebook, Instagram are also banned in Xinjiang.

== See also ==
- AirDrop
- Briar (software)
- Nearby Share
- Wi-Fi Direct
