= Samsung Galaxy S4 Mini =

2013 Android-based smartphone by Samsung Electronics

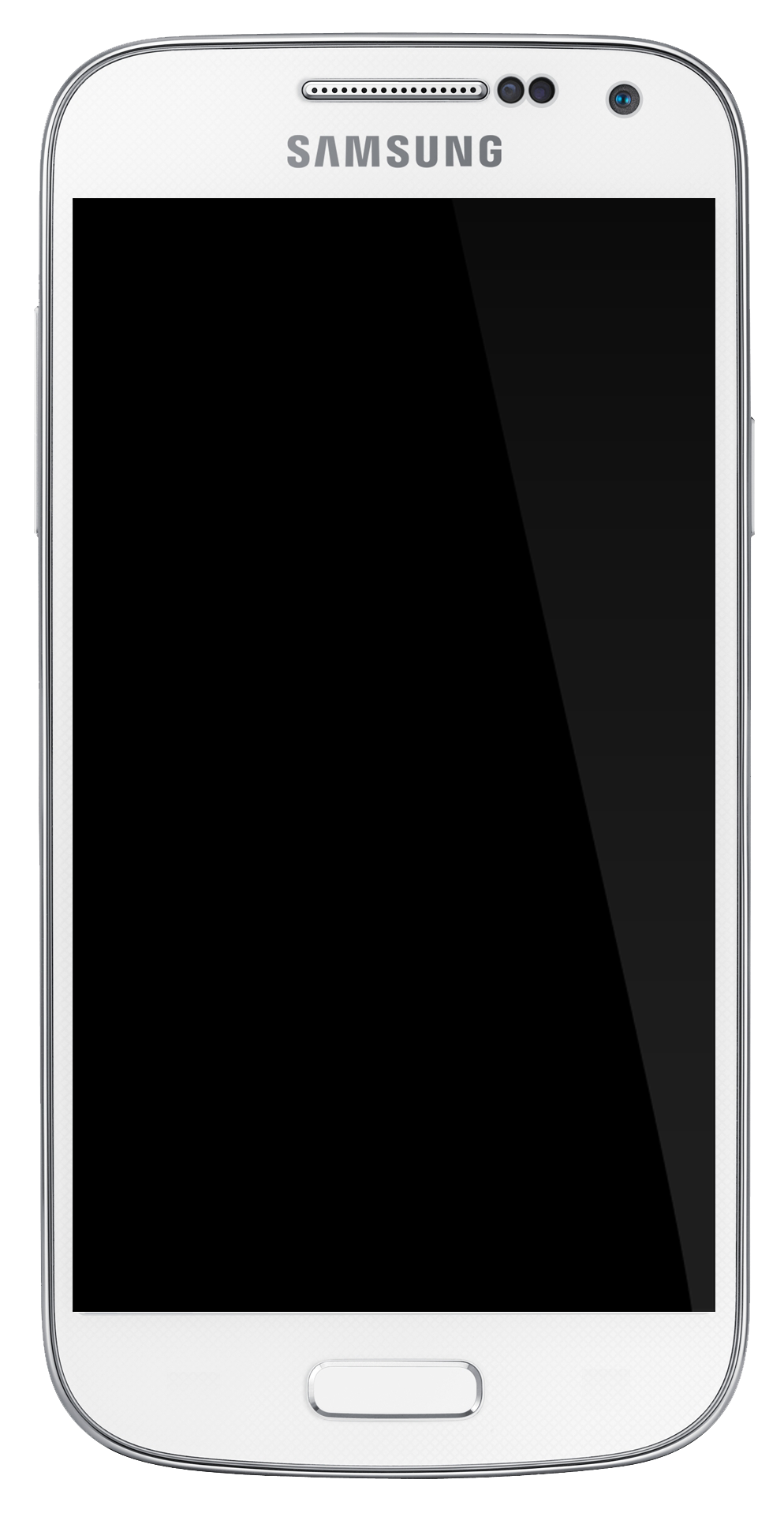
- Galaxy S4 mini in White frost
- Manufacturer: Samsung Electronics
- Type: Touchscreen smartphone
- Series: Galaxy S
- First released: July 2013; 13 years ago
- Predecessor: Samsung Galaxy S III Mini
- Successor: Samsung Galaxy S5 Mini
- Related: Samsung Galaxy S4; Samsung Galaxy S4 Active; Samsung Galaxy S4 Zoom; Samsung Galaxy Note 3
- Compatible networks: 2G GSM/GPRS/EDGE – 850, 900, 1800, 1900 MHz 3G UMTS/HSPA+ – 850, 900, 1900, 2100 MHz; 4G LTE 2100 (1), 1800 (3), 850 (5), 2600 (7), 900 (8), 800 (20) MHz (GT-I9195 model) TD-SCDMA (GT-I9198 model)
- Form factor: Slate
- Dimensions: 124.6 mm (4.91 in) H 61.3 mm (2.41 in) W 8.9 mm (0.35 in) D
- Weight: 107 g (3.8 oz)
- Operating system: Original: Android 4.2.2 with Linux 3.4.x (All models excluding I9192/5I), Android 4.4.4 with Linux 3.10.x (GT-I9192/5I); Current: Android 4.4.2 (All models excluding I9192/5I), Android 4.4.4 (GT-I9192/5I); Unofficial: LineageOS 18.1 (unstable, based on Android 11)
- System-on-chip: Qualcomm Snapdragon 400 (8230AB/8930AB) / Snapdragon 410 (8916)
- CPU: 1.7 GHz dual-core Krait 300; 1.2 GHz Quad-core Cortex-A53 (S4 Mini Plus)
- GPU: Adreno 305
- Memory: 1.5 GB
- Storage: 8 GB (5 GB user available)
- Removable storage: Up to 64 GB microSDXC
- Battery: 1900 mAh (7.22 Wh 3.8 V) Li-ion
- Rear camera: List: 8.0 MP (3264 x 2448 pixels) back-side illuminated sensor; 1080p Full HD Video Recording @ 30fps; Autofocus; LED flash; No image stabilization in video; Digital zoom:10.0 x; Face detection; Exposure compensation; ISO control; White balance presets; Burst mode; Geo tagging; High Dynamic Range mode (HDR); Panorama; Macro mode; Night mode; Scenes; Effects; Self-timer
- Front camera: 1.9 MP, HD video (720p) at 60 fps
- Display: 4.27 in (108 mm) RGB Super AMOLED; 960x540 px, qHD (258 PPI); Corning Gorilla Glass
- Connectivity: 3.5 mm TRRS; Wi-Fi (802.11a/b/g/n 2.4 & 5 GHz); Wi-Fi Direct; Bluetooth 4.0; micro USB 2.0; NFC (GT-I9195); DLNA; UMA
- Data inputs: Multi-touch capacitive touchscreen, headset controls, Proximity sensor, Ambient light sensor, 3-axis Gyroscope, Magnetometer, Accelerometer, IR Blaster, aGPS, GLONASS
- Website: Galaxy S4 Mini website (archived)

The Samsung Galaxy S4 Mini (stylized as Samsung GALAXY S4 mini) is an Android-based smartphone developed by the Korean manufacturer Samsung Electronics. Announced on May 31, 2013 and released in July 2013, the S4 Mini is a mid-range model of its flagship Galaxy S4 smartphone and a successor to the Galaxy S III Mini. It has a similar hardware design and software features to its high-end counterpart.

== Specifications ==
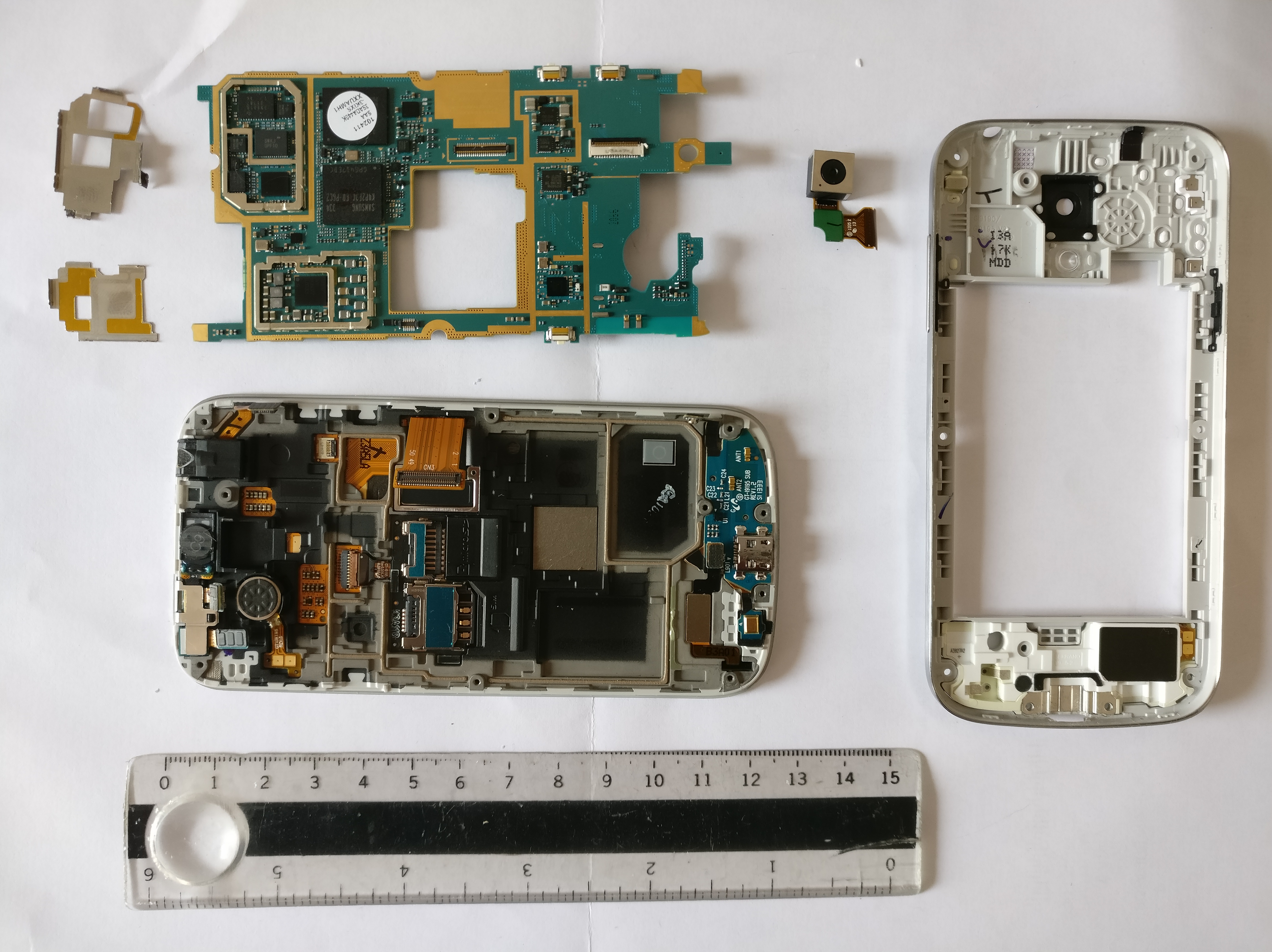
The inside of a Samsung Galaxy S4 mini

The S4 Mini uses an almost identical variant of the Galaxy S4's polycarbonate hardware design. Internally, it features a dual-core 1.7 GHz Snapdragon 400 processor with 1.5 GB of RAM, 8 GB of internal storage that can be expanded using a MicroSD card, and a 4.27 inch qHD (540 x 960 pixel) Super AMOLED screen. The S4 Mini also includes a 1.9-megapixel (MP) front-facing camera, and an improved 8-megapixel rear-facing camera with 1080p video recording at 30 frames per second, compared to the 720p of the Galaxy S3 Mini.

=== Software and updates ===
Similarly to the S4, the S4 Mini comes with Android 4.2.2 Jelly Bean and Samsung's TouchWiz software, although certain features present on the S4 are not available (such as Air Gestures, Air View, Multi-window, Smart Pause, Smart Rotation, and Smart Scroll).

The S4 Mini received the Android 4.4.2 "KitKat" update in June 2014 (though not in all regions), bringing some minor UI changes as seen on the Galaxy S4 and S4 Active.

When asked about whether the Samsung Galaxy S4 Mini would receive the Android 5.0 ''Lollipop'' update on the April 24, 2015, Three UK stated that it would not get the Lollipop update, blaming "memory limitations". However, Three Ireland stated later on the very same day that the S4 Mini would indeed get the Lollipop update and that it would start rolling out in the coming weeks. Though Samsung UK and US carrier Sprint had earlier stated that the S4 Mini would get the Lollipop update, several later retweets from Samsung itself suggest that this was misinformation, stating that it had failed the initial test for the update. The Galaxy S4 Mini ultimately did not receive an official Lollipop update in any region.

=== International variants ===
The S4 Mini version released in most of Europe, Latin America, South Africa and few Asian countries contains NFC connectivity, which came standard on all versions of the Galaxy S4. The Galaxy S4 Mini is made available in:

- GSM & HSDPA (GT-I9190);
- LTE (GT-I9195), with NFC;
  - GT-I9195L, exclusively for Latin America
  - GT-I9195T, exclusively for Australia
- Dual SIM (GT-I9192), with 16 GB of internal storage in some regions;
- LTE (GT-I9197), without NFC;
- TD-SCDMA (GT-I9198)
- Canadian AWS LTE (SGH-I257M)(No AWS Band 4)
- Verizon LTE (SCH-I435)

== Samsung Galaxy S4 Mini Plus ==
On August 3, 2015, Samsung released an updated version of the S4 Mini called the S4 Mini Plus (also known as S4 Mini Value Edition). It features a new 1.2 GHz Quad core processor, an Adreno 306 GPU, and comes with Android 4.4.4 KitKat. The rest of the specs remain the same. The Galaxy S4 Mini Plus is available in two variants:

- LTE (GT-I9195I), with NFC;
- Dual SIM (GT-I9192I).

It is the final phone that uses a model number in the "GT-XXXXX" format, and Samsung's last phone in the Galaxy S "mini" series, before replaced by the Galaxy A series.

== Successor ==
The successor to the Galaxy S4 Mini is the Galaxy S5 Mini. It was announced on May 30, 2014, and was subsequently released in July 2014.

== See also ==
- Comparison of Samsung Galaxy S smartphones
- HTC One Mini
- Samsung Galaxy S series

Preceded by Samsung Galaxy S III Mini	Samsung Galaxy S4 Mini; 2013	Succeeded by Samsung Galaxy S5 Mini
