= Bump (application) =

Discontinued file sharing app

- Original author: Bump Technologies
- Release: March 27, 2009; 17 years ago
- Final release: 3.5.6 (iOS) (February 14, 2013; 13 years ago); 3.4.9 (Android) (February 14, 2013; 13 years ago) [±]
- Operating system: Android 2.2 and later, iOS 4.3 and later
- Size: Android: 7.5 MB iOS: 5.6 MB
- Available in: English, Chinese, French, German, Italian, Japanese, Korean, Spanish
- Type: Utility software
- Website: bu.mp

Bump was an Android and iOS mobile app that enabled smartphone users to transfer contact information, photos and files between devices. By February 2013, it had been downloaded 125 million times. Its developer, Bump Technologies, shut down the service and discontinued the app on January 31, 2014, after being acquired by Google for Google Photos and Android Camera.

== Features ==
Bump sent contact information, photos and files to another device over the internet. Before activating the transfer, each user confirmed what they want to send to the other user. To initiate a transfer, two people physically bumped their phones together. A screen appeared on both users' smartphone displays, allowing them to confirm what they want to send to each other. When two users bumped their phones, software on the phones send a variety of sensor data to an algorithm running on Bump servers, which included the location of the phone, accelerometer readings, IP address, and other sensor readings. The algorithm figured out which two phones felt the same physical bump and then transfers the information between those phones. Bump did not use Near Field Communication.

With the February 2012 release of Bump 3.0 for iOS, the company streamlined the app to focus on its most frequently used features: contact and photo sharing. Bump 3.0 for Android maintained the features eliminated from the iOS version but moved them behind swipeable layers.

In May 2012, a Bump update enabled users to transfer photos from their phone to their computer via a web service. To initiate a transfer, the user goes to the Bump website on their computer and bumps the smartphone on the computer keyboard's space bar. By December 2012, various Bump updates for iOS and Android had added the abilities to share video, audio, and any files. Users swipe to access those features.

In February 2013, an update to the Bump iOS and Android apps enabled users to transfer photos, videos, contacts and other files from a computer to a smartphone and vice versa via a web service. To perform the transfer, users went to the Bump website on their computer and bump the smartphone on the computer keyboard's space bar.

== History ==
The underlying idea of a synchronous gesture like bumping two devices for content transfer or pairing them was first conceived by Ken Hinkley of Microsoft Research in 2003. Similar to this original concept, the idea for Bump app was conceived by David Lieb, a former employee of Texas Instruments, while he was attending the University of Chicago Booth School of Business for his MBA. While going through the orientation and meeting process of business school, he became frustrated by constantly entering contact information into his iPhone and felt that the process could be improved. His fellow Texas Instruments employees Andy Huibers and Jake Mintz, who was also a classmate from the University of Chicago's MBA program, joined Lieb to form Bump Technologies.

Bump Technologies launched in 2008 and was located in Mountain View, CA. Early funding for the project was provided by startup incubator Y Combinator, Sequoia Capital and other angel investors. It gained attention at the CTIA international wireless conference, due to its accessibility and novelty factor. In October 2009, Bump received $3.4m in Series A funding and then in January 2011, a $16m series B financing round led by Andreessen Horowitz. Silicon Valley venture capitalist Marc Andreessen sits on the company's board.

The Bump app debuted in the Apple iOS App Store in March 2009 and was “one of the apps that helped to define the iPhone” (Harry McCracken, Technologizer). It soon became the billionth download on Apple's App Store. An Android version launched in November 2009. By the time Bump 3.0 for iOS was released in February 2012, the app had been installed 77 million times, with users sharing more than 2 million photos daily. As of February 2013, there had been 125 million Bump app downloads.

== Other apps created by Bump Technologies ==
Bump Technologies worked with PayPal in March 2010 to create a PayPal iPhone application. The application, which allows two users to automatically activate an Internet transfer of money between their accounts, found widespread adoption. A similar version was released for Android in August 2010.

The Bump capability in PayPal's apps was removed in March 2012. At that time, Bump Technologies released Bump Pay, an iOS app that lets users transfer money via PayPal by physically bumping two smartphones together. The tool was originally created for the Bump team to use when splitting up restaurant bills. The payment feature was not added to the Bump app because the company “wanted to make it as simple as possible so people understand how this works,” Lieb told ABC News. Bump Pay was the first app from the company's Bump Labs initiative. A goal of Bump Labs is to test new app ideas that may not fit within the main Bump app.

ING Direct added a feature to its iPhone app in 2011 that lets users transfer money to each other using Bump's technology. The feature was later added to its Android app.

In July 2012, Bump Technologies released Flock, an iPhone photo sharing app. An Android version was released in December 2012. Using geolocation data embedded in photos and a user's Facebook connections, Flock finds pictures the user takes while out with friends and family and puts everyone's photos from that event into a single shared album. Users receive a push notification after the event, asking if they want to share their photos with friends who were there in the moment. The app will also scan previous photos in the iPhone camera roll and uncover photos that have yet to be shared. If location services were enabled at the time a photo was taken, Flock allows users to create an album of photos from the past with the friends who were there with them.

== Acquisition by Google ==
On September 16, 2013, Bump Technologies announced that it had been acquired by Google. On December 31, 2013, they broke the news that both Bump and Flock would be discontinued so that the team could focus on new projects at Google. The apps were removed from the App Store and Google Play on January 31, 2014. The company subsequently deleted all user data and shut down their servers, thus rendering existing installations of the apps inoperable.

== See also ==
- Android Beam
