= Samsung Galaxy S III Progre =

2012 Android smartphone by Samsung

- Manufacturer: Samsung Electronics
- First released: November 2, 2012; 14 years ago
- Operating system: Android 4.0.4 → 4.1.2
- CPU: Qualcomm Snapdragon S4 Plus MSM8960 1.5GHz (Dual core)

The Samsung Galaxy S III Progre is an Android-based smartphone developed for the Japanese market by Samsung Electronics of Korea (importer: Samsung Telecommunications Japan), KDDI and Okinawa. It uses au brand CDMA 1X WIN, and 3.9-generation mobile communication system (au 4G LTE) smartphone. The product number is SCH-J021.

== au version ==
In the au version of Galaxy S III, the basic performance is almost the same as SC-06D which was released for NTT Docomo.

However, its appearance is somewhat different, and in the global and Docomo version the glass part of the display, which had been shaped to protrude from the surrounding frame, instead the frame part protrudes above the glass surface. In addition, a strap attachment hole is available. The antenna for Osaifu-Keitai is not built in the rechargeable battery but attached to the battery lid.

Its length is 2 mm longer, and is 2 g heavier.

It does not support NFC/ infrared communication and is not waterproof.

The SAR value of this machine is 0.275 W / kg, which is the lowest as of November 2012 as an existing smartphone for au, including corporate users.

== History ==
- 2012 (Heisei 24) October 17 - KDDI and official announcement from Samsung Telecommunications Japan.
- October 20, 2012 - Pass through the Federal Communications Commission (FCC).
- November 2, 2012 - Release in Hokkaido, Kanto and Okinawa districts.
- November 9, 2012 - Release in the remaining districts.
- November 12, 2013 - Start updating to Android 4.1.

== Update ==
On November 12, 2013 the phone's OS received a version upgrade:

- Smart rotation function
- Page buddy function
- Pop-up play available with One Seg
- Multi-window function
- Facebook added to the information telop displayed on the lock screen
- "Image", "movie", "music", "document" categories in My Files application, and the storage destination is categorized for each data type
- Change the UI of the gallery application
- Block mode function
  - Flick operation becomes available in Roman character input
  - Enhanced camera function
- Continuous shooting in "Best Face Mode": choose the best smile and combine them into one picture
- Panorama mode
