= Samsung Galaxy S III =

2012 Android smartphone developed by Samsung Electronics

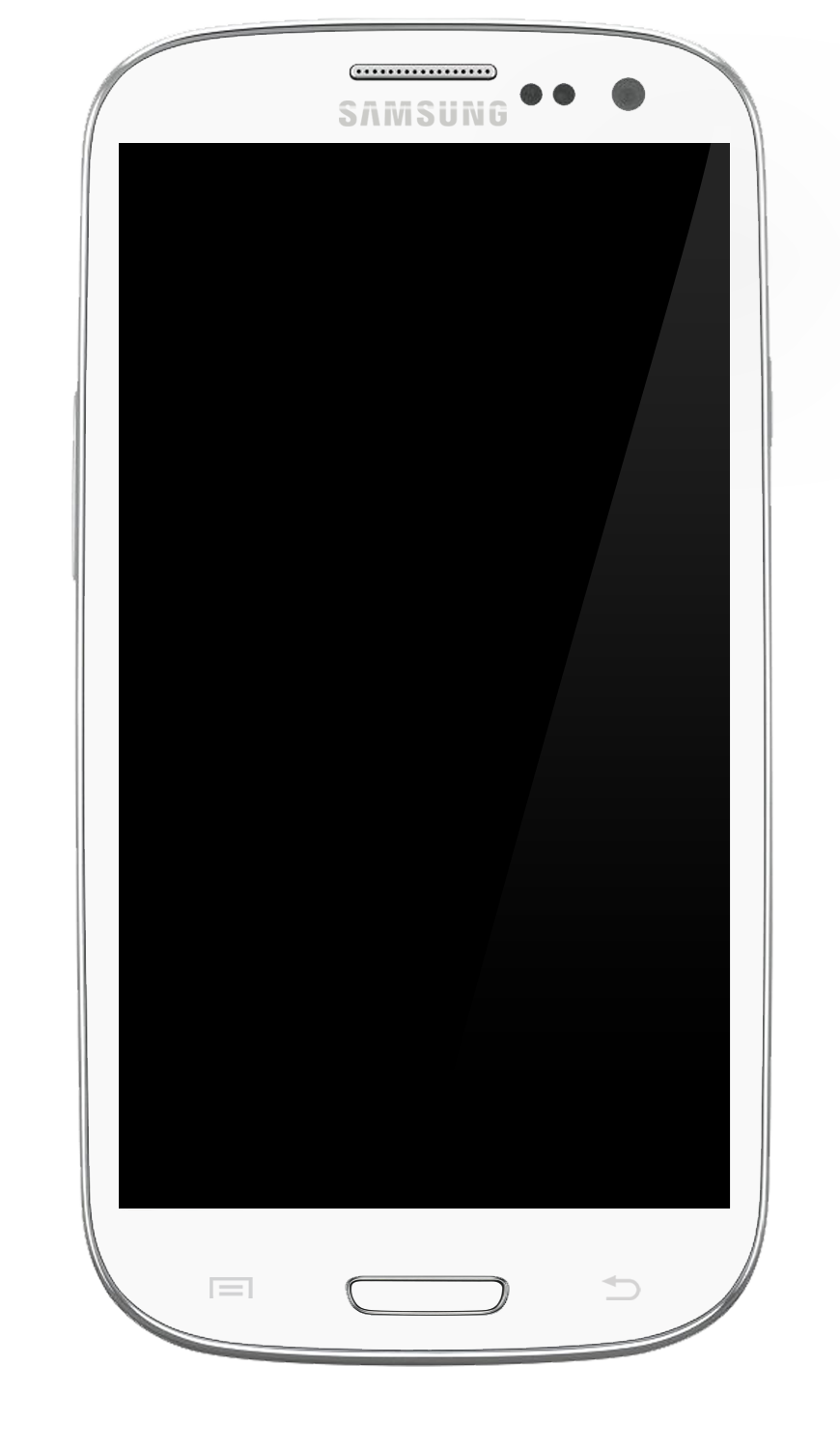
- Galaxy S III in white
- Also known as: Samsung Galaxy S3
- Brand: Samsung
- Manufacturer: Samsung Electronics
- Type: Smartphone
- Series: Galaxy S
- First released: 29 May 2012; 14 years ago
- Availability by region: 145 countries (July 2012)
- Units sold: 9 million orders before release; 70 million total (as of 2017)
- Predecessor: Samsung Galaxy S II
- Successor: Samsung Galaxy S4
- Related: Samsung Galaxy Note II; Samsung Galaxy S III Neo; Samsung Galaxy S III Mini; Samsung Ativ S
- Compatible networks: 2G GSM/GPRS/EDGE: 850, 900, 1800, 1900 MHz 3G UMTS/CDMA2000/HSPA+: 850, 900, 1700, 1800 (Korean Pcs LG U+), 1900, 2100 MHz 4G LTE: 700, 800, 850, 1700, 1800, 1900, 2500, 2600 MHz; TD-SCDMA (China Mobile Variant) and GT-i9305
- Form factor: Slate
- Colors: Pebble blue, Marble white, Amber brown, Garnet red, Sapphire black, Titanium grey
- Dimensions: 136.6 mm (5.38 in) H 70.6 mm (2.78 in) W 8.6 mm (0.34 in) (9.0 mm (0.35 in) on South Korean model) D
- Weight: 133 g (4.69 oz)
- Operating system: Original: Android 4.0.4 "Ice Cream Sandwich"; Current: Android 4.3 "Jelly Bean", Android 4.4.2 "KitKat" (2 GB RAM variants and GT-I9301I Neo only); Unofficial: Android 14 "Upside Down Cake" via LineageOS 21.0 Unofficial for Samsung Galaxy S III GT-I9300 Exynos Variant Android 8.1 "Oreo" via LineageOS 15.1 Unofficial for Samsung Galaxy S III d2 Snapdragon variants
- System-on-chip: Samsung Exynos 4 Quad (GT-I9300); Qualcomm Snapdragon S4 MSM8960 (U.S & Canada & Japan variants); Qualcomm Snapdragon 400 MSM8228 (GT-I9301I Neo)
- CPU: 1.4 GHz quad-core Cortex-A9 (GT-I9300); 1.3 GHz dual-core Krait (U.S. & Canada & Japan variants); 1.2 GHz quad-core ARM Cortex-A7 (GT-I9301I Neo)
- GPU: Mali-400 MP4 (GT-I9300); Adreno 225 (U.S. & Canada & Japan variants); Adreno 305 (GT-I9301I Neo)
- Memory: 1 GB RAM (international version); 2 GB RAM (LTE versions, selected markets); 1.5 GB RAM (GT-I9301I Neo)
- Storage: 16, 32, or 64 GB flash memory
- Removable storage: Up to 64 GB microSDXC
- Battery: 2,100 mAh, 7.98 Wh, 3.8 V Li-ion; User replaceable
- Rear camera: 8 megapixels List: 8.0 megapixels back-side illuminated sensor; LED flash; HD video (1080p) at 30 frames/s; Aperture f/2.6; Autofocus; Zero shutter lag; Simultaneous HD video and image recording; Smile and face detection
- Front camera: 1.9 megapixels Zero shutter lag HD video (720p) at 30 frames/s
- Display: 4.8 in (120 mm) HD Super AMOLED (720×1280) List: 4.8 in (120 mm) diagonal with 16:9 aspect ratio widescreen; HD Super AMOLED touchscreen; 720×1280 pixels (306 ppi) (PenTile RGBG); Contrast ratio: infinite (nominal) / 3.419:1 (sunlight); 16M colors
- Connectivity: List: 3.5 mm TRRS; Bluetooth 4.0; DLNA; Micro-USB On-The-Go Type-B with MHL link; Miracast; NFC; Samsung Kies; Wi-Fi (802.11 a/b/g/n); Wi-Fi Direct
- Data inputs: List: Multi-touch capacitive touchscreen; 3 push buttons; aGPS; GLONASS; Barometer; Gyroscope; Accelerometer; Digital compass
- Development status: Discontinued
- Other: List: Wi-Fi hotspot, AllShare, Damage-resistant Gorilla Glass 2; Online services Google Play, Galaxy Apps

The Samsung Galaxy S III (unofficially known as the Samsung Galaxy S3) is an Android-based smartphone developed and marketed by Samsung Electronics. Launched in 2012, it had sold more than 80 million units overall, making it the most sold phone in the S series. It is the third smartphone in the Samsung Galaxy S series.

It is distinguished from its predecessor by its larger, higher-resolution screen, higher storage options, a larger battery, and a video camera with stereo audio recording for a spatial effect on headphones and external speakers. While the picture and video resolutions of the camera stayed the same, its launching speed and shutter lag improved.

It has additional software features, expanded hardware, and a redesigned physique from its predecessor, the Galaxy S II, released the previous year. The "S III" employs an intelligent personal assistant (S Voice), eye-tracking ability, and increased storage. Although a wireless charging option was announced, it never came to fruition. However, there are third-party kits which add support for Qi wireless charging. Depending on the country, the smartphone comes with different processors and RAM capacity, and 4G LTE support. The device was launched with Android 4.0.4 "Ice Cream Sandwich", was updated to Android 4.3 "Jelly Bean", and can be updated to Android 4.4.2 "KitKat" on variants with 2 GB of RAM. The phone's successor, the Galaxy S4, was announced on 14 March 2013 and was released the following month.

Following an 18-month development phase, Samsung unveiled the S III on 3 May 2012. The device was released in 28 European and Middle Eastern countries on 29 May 2012, before being progressively released in other major markets in June 2012. Before release, 9 million pre-orders were placed by more than 100 carriers globally. The S III was released by approximately 300 carriers in nearly 150 countries at the end of July 2012. More than 20 million units of the S III were sold within the first 100 days of release and more than 50 million until April 2013.

The S III was well-received commercially and critically, with some technology commentators touting it as the "iPhone killer". In September 2012, TechRadar ranked it as the No. 1 handset in its constantly updated list of the 20 best mobile phones, while Stuff magazine likewise ranked it at No. 1 in its list of 10 best smartphones in May 2012. The handset also won the "European Mobile Phone of 2012–13" award from the European Imaging and Sound Association, as well as T3 magazine's "Phone of the Year" award for 2012. It played a major role in boosting Samsung's record operating profit during the second quarter of 2012. As of November 2012, the S III is part of a high-profile lawsuit between Samsung and Apple. In November 2012, research firm Strategy Analytics announced that the S III had overtaken Apple's iPhone 4S to become the world's best-selling smartphone model in Q3 2012. Because of overwhelming demand and a manufacturing problem with the blue variant of the phone, there was an extensive shortage of the S III, especially in the United States.

The Samsung Galaxy S III was succeeded as the series flagship by the Samsung Galaxy S4 in April 2013. In April 2014, following the release of its new flagship, the Galaxy S5, Samsung released a refreshed version called the "Galaxy S III Neo", which has a quad-core Snapdragon 400 processor clocked either at 1.2 or 1.4 GHz. It has two SIM card slots, 1.5 GB of RAM, 16 GB of internal storage, comes with Android 4.3 "Jelly Bean", and lacks the screen protection and barometer.

== History ==
Design work on the S III started in late 2010 under the supervision of Chang Dong-hoon, Samsung's vice president and Head of the Design Group of Samsung Electronics. From the start, the design group concentrated on a trend which Samsung dubs "organic", which suggests that a prospective design should reflect natural elements such as the flow of water and wind. Some of the results of this design were the curved outline of the phone and its home screen's "Water Lux" effect, where taps and slides produce water ripples.

Throughout the eighteen-month design process, Samsung implemented stringent security measures and procedures to maintain secrecy of the eventual design until its launch. Designers worked on three prototypes concurrently while regarding each of them as the final product. Doing so required a constant duplication of effort, as they had to repeat the same process for all three prototypes. The prototypes, of which taking photos was forbidden, were locked in a separate laboratory, accessible only by core designers. They were transported by trusted company employees, instead of third-party couriers. "Because we were only permitted to see the products and others weren't," explained Principal Engineer Lee Byung-Joon, "we couldn't send pictures or drawings. We had to explain the Galaxy S III with all sorts of words." Despite such security measures, specifications of one of the three units were leaked by Vietnamese Web site Tinhte, although it was not the selected design.

Speculation in the general public and media outlets regarding the handset's specifications began gathering momentum several months before its formal unveiling in May 2012. In February 2012, prior to the Mobile World Congress (MWC) in Barcelona, Spain, there were rumors that the handset would incorporate a 1.5 GHz quad-core processor, a display of 1080p (1080×1920 pixels) resolution, a 12-megapixel rear camera and a HD Super AMOLED Plus touchscreen. More accurate rumored specifications included 2 GB of RAM, 64 GB of internal storage, 4G LTE, a 4.8-inch (120 mm) screen, an 8-megapixel rear camera, and a 9-millimetre (0.35 in) thick chassis. Samsung confirmed the existence of the Galaxy S II's successor on 5 March 2012, but it was not until late April 2012 that Samsung's Senior Vice-president Robert Yi confirmed the phone to be called "Samsung Galaxy S III".

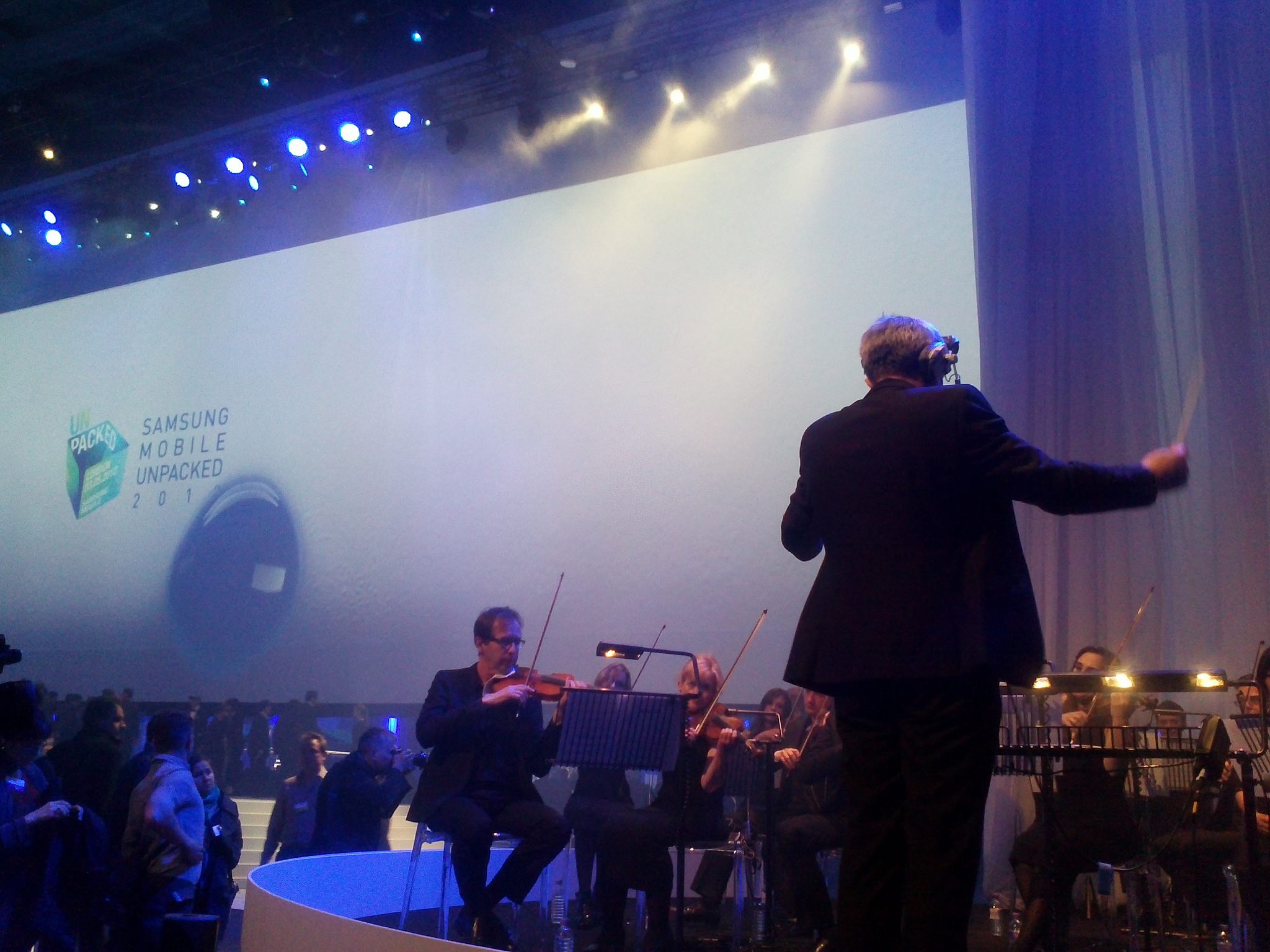
The Galaxy S III's launch at Samsung Mobile Unpacked 2012 (3 May 2012)

After inviting reporters in mid-April, Samsung launched the Galaxy S III during the Samsung Mobile Unpacked 2012 event at Earls Court Exhibition Centre, London, United Kingdom, on 3 May 2012, instead of unveiling their products earlier in the year during either the World Mobile Congress or Consumer Electronics Show (CES). One explanation for this decision is that Samsung wanted to minimize the time between its launch and availability. The keynote address of the hour-long event was delivered by Loesje De Vriese, Marketing Director of Samsung Belgium.

Following the launch of the Galaxy S4 in June 2013, Samsung was reportedly retiring the phone earlier than planned because of low sales numbers and to streamline manufacturing operations.

== Features ==
=== Hardware ===
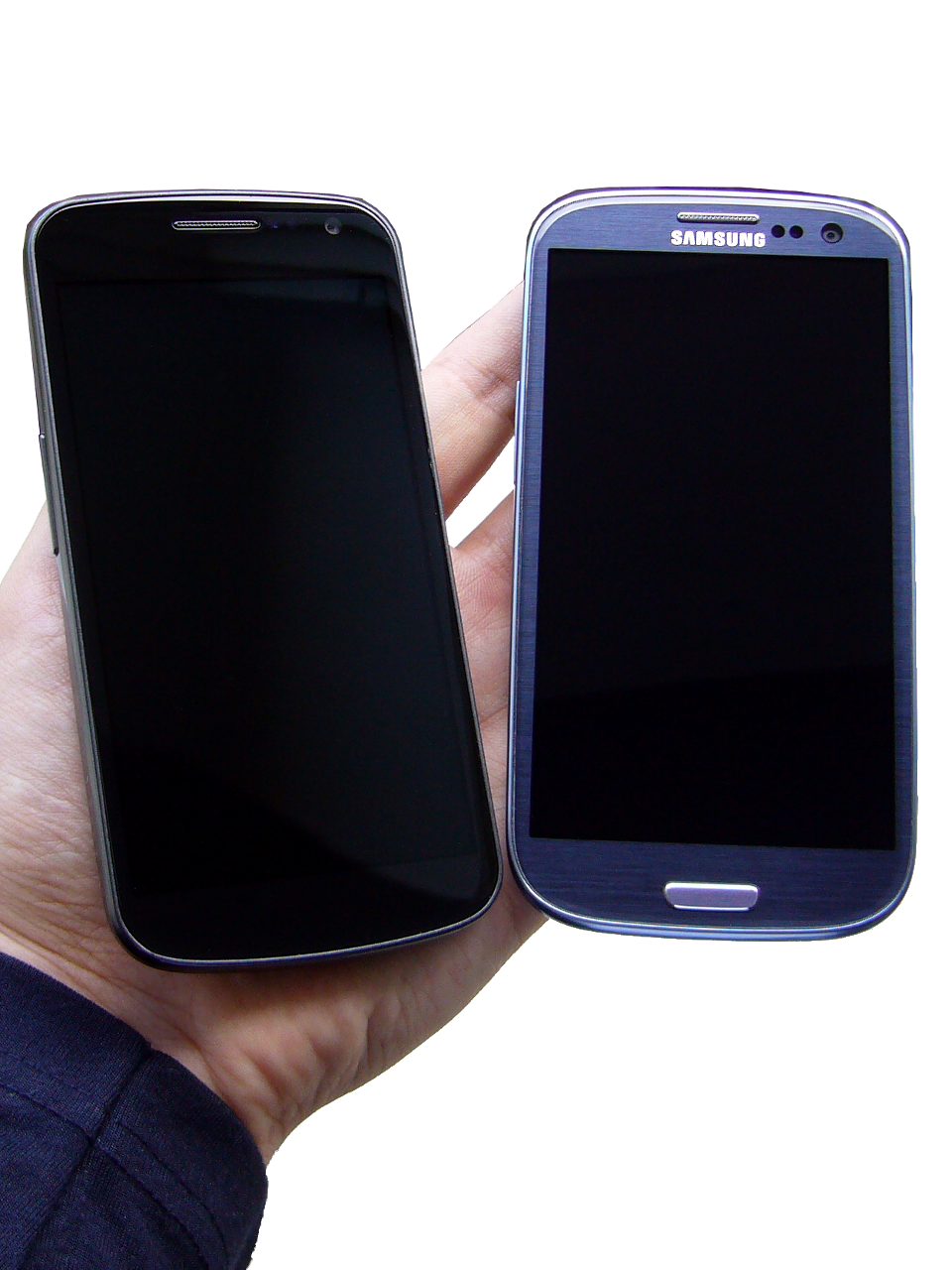
The Galaxy Nexus (left) and the Galaxy S III (right)

==== Design ====
The S III has a plastic chassis measuring 136.6 mm (5.38 in) long, 70.6 mm (2.78 in) wide, and 8.6 mm (0.34 in) thick, with the device weighing 133 grams (4.7 oz). Samsung abandoned the rectangular design of the Galaxy S and Galaxy S II, and instead incorporated round corners and curved edges, reminiscent of the Galaxy Nexus. The device has been available in several colour options: white (marketed as "marble white"), black, gray, brushed dark blue (marketed as "pebble blue"), red (marketed as "garnet red"), and brown. A "Garnet Red" model was made available exclusively to US carrier AT&T on 15 July 2012.

In addition to the 4.8-inch (120 mm) touchscreen, the S III has several physical user inputs, including a home button located below the screen, an option key to the left side of the home button, a back key on the right side of the home button, a volume key on the left edge and a power/lock key on the right. At the top there is a 3.5-millimetre (0.14 in) headphone jack and one of the two microphones on the S III; the other is located below the home button.

==== Chipsets ====
The S III comes in two distinct variations that differ primarily in the internal hardware. The international S III version has Samsung's Exynos 4 Quad system on a chip (SoC) containing a 1.4 GHz quad-core ARM Cortex-A9 central processing unit (CPU) and an ARM Mali-400 MP graphics processing unit (GPU). According to Samsung, the Exynos 4 Quad doubles the performance of the Exynos 4 Dual used on the S II, while using 20 percent less power. Samsung had also released several 4G LTE versions—4G facilitates higher-speed mobile connection compared to 3G—in selected countries to exploit the corresponding communications infrastructures that exist in those markets. Most of these versions use Qualcomm's Snapdragon S4 SoC featuring a dual-core 1.5 GHz Krait CPU and an Adreno 225 GPU. The South Korean and Australian versions are a hybrid of the international and 4G-capable versions.

==== Sensors ====
Like its predecessor, the S3 is equipped with an accelerometer, gyroscope, front-facing proximity sensor, and a digital compass sensor.

However, the Galaxy S3 is the first Samsung flagship phone to be equipped with a barometer sensor.

==== Storage ====
The S III has a maximum of 2 GB of RAM, depending on the model. The phone comes with either 16, 32, or 64 GB storage; additionally, microSDXC storage offers a further 64 GB for a potential total of 128 GB. Moreover, 50 GB of space is offered for two years on Dropbox—a cloud storage service—for purchasers of the device, doubling rival HTC's 25 GB storage for the same duration.

==== Display ====
The S III's HD Super AMOLED display measures 4.8 inches (120 mm) on the diagonal. With a 720×1280-pixel (720p) resolution, its 306 pixels per inch (PPI, a measure of pixel density) is a relatively high, which is accommodated by the removal of one of the three subpixels—red, green and blue—in each pixel to create a PenTile matrix-display; consequently, it does not share the "Plus" suffix found on the S II's Super AMOLED Plus display. The glass used for the display is the damage-resistant corning Gorilla Glass 2, except for S3 Neo variant. The device's software includes a feature known as "Smart Stay", which uses the device's front camera to detect whether the user's eyes are looking at the screen, and prevents the screen from automatically turning off while the user is still looking at it.

Like its predecessor, the Galaxy S3 supports Mobile High-Definition Link (MHL) for connection to HDMI displays. The S3 is newly equipped with Miracast support (also known as Screen Mirroring; also branded "AllShare Cast" by Samsung) that allows wirelessly transmitting the device's display view to a supported television or Blu-ray player with integrated Miracast support.

==== Camera ====
The S III has an 8-megapixel (3264×2448) camera similar to that of the Galaxy S II. It can take 3264×2448-pixel resolution photos and record videos in 1920×1080-pixel (1080p) resolution.

The camera software allows digital zooming up to four times, and displays the video's current file size (in kilobytes) as well as remaining storage capacity (in megabytes) in real-time during video recording.

Samsung improved the camera's software over that of its predecessor to include zero shutter lag, and a Burst shot mode that allows capturing up to 20 full-resolution photos per row in quick succession. Another feature, Best Shot, allows selecting the best photo out of eight frames captured in quick succession. The phone can also take pictures while recording videos. Photos can additionally be captured using voice commands such as "cheese", "shoot", "photo", and "picture". The shortcuts on the left pane are customizable.

The rear-facing camera is complemented by a 1.9-megapixel front-facing camera that can record 720p videos. The phone has LED flash and autofocus.

The Galaxy S3 records videos with stereo audio and is able to capture 6 MP (3264×1836) photos during video recording, which is the full 16:9 aspect ratio section of the 4:3 image sensor.

==== Battery ====
The S III's user-replaceable Li-ion 2,100 mAh battery is said to have a 790-hour standby time or 11 hours of talk time on 3G, compared to 900 hours in standby and 21 hours of talk time on 2G.

==== Connectivity ====
Built into the battery is near field communication (NFC) connectivity, which allows users to share files, map directions and YouTube videos quickly using Wi-Fi Direct (through S Beam or Android Beam), and perform non-touch payments at shops that employ specially equipped NFC cash registers. The battery can be wirelessly charged using a special charging pad (sold separately) that utilizes magnetic resonance to produce a magnetic field through which electricity could be transferred.

The S III is advertised as having an MHL port that can be used both as a micro-USB On-The-Go port and for connecting the phone to HDMI devices. However, a retailer later discovered that Samsung had modified the electronics of the port such that only the adapter made specifically for this model by Samsung could be used.

CNET TV torture-tested an S III by cooling it to −4 °C (25 °F), placing it in a heat-proof box and heating it to 88 °C (190 °F), and submerging it in water—the S III survived all three tests. The phone also did not exhibit any scratches when a key was repeatedly scraped against the display. However, Android Authority later carried out a drop test to compare the S III and the iPhone 5. The screen on the S III shattered on the second drop test, while the iPhone received only minor scuffs and scratches on the metal composite frame after three drop tests.

==== Accessories ====
Accessories for the Galaxy S3 include a wireless charging kit, the Pebble MP3 player, a docking station, a C-Pen, a slimline case, and a car mount.

=== Software and services ===
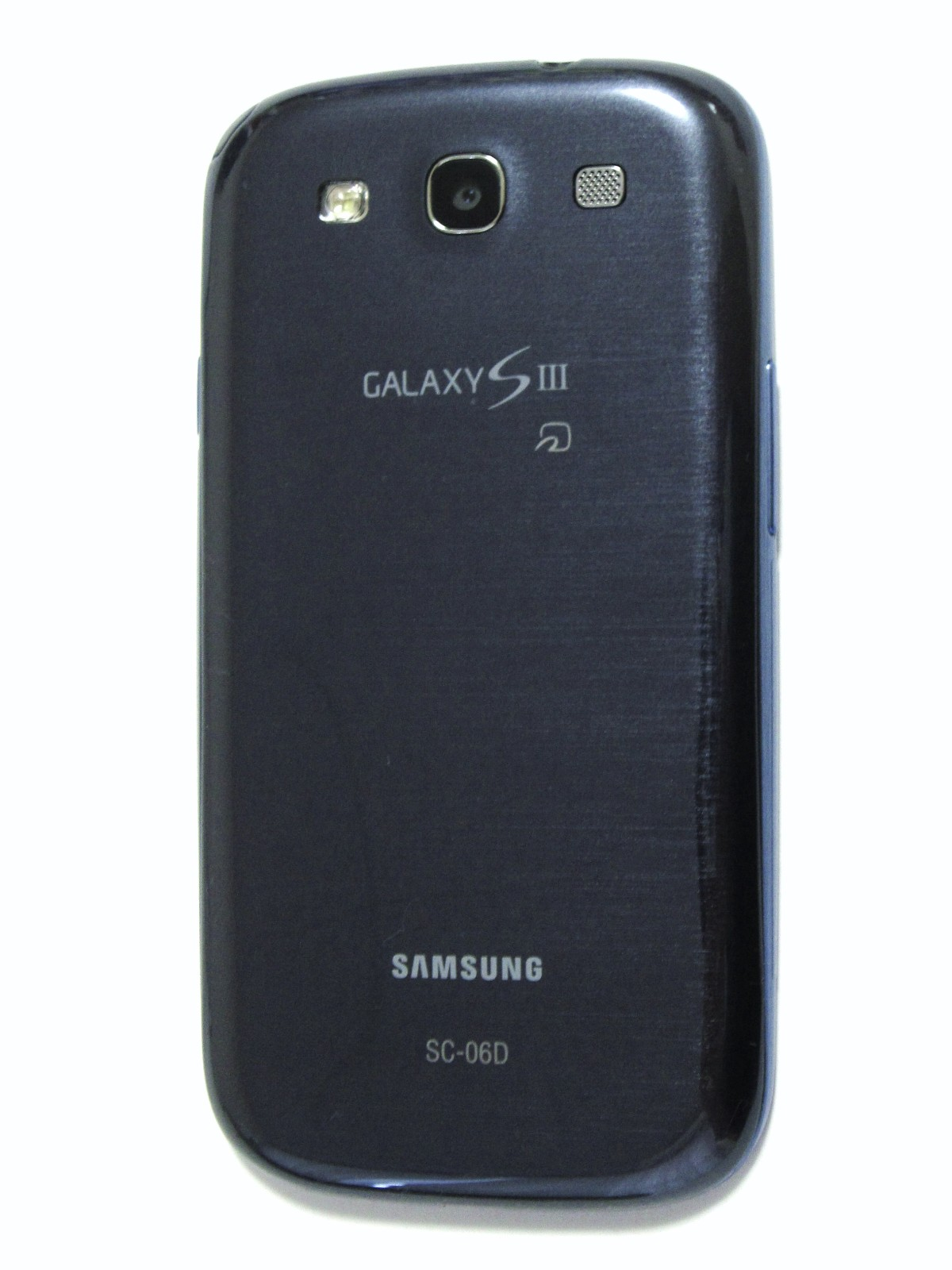
Back view of the Japanese S III model, SC-06D

==== User interface ====
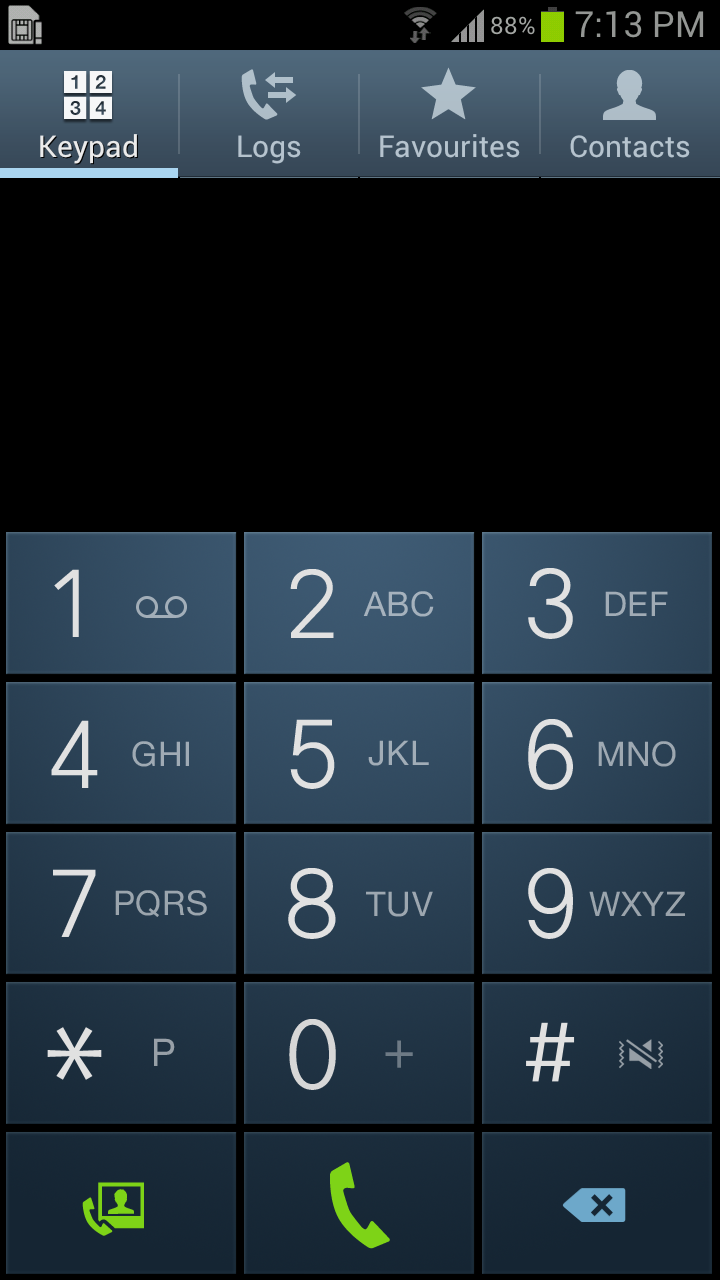
Dial pad of a Galaxy S3

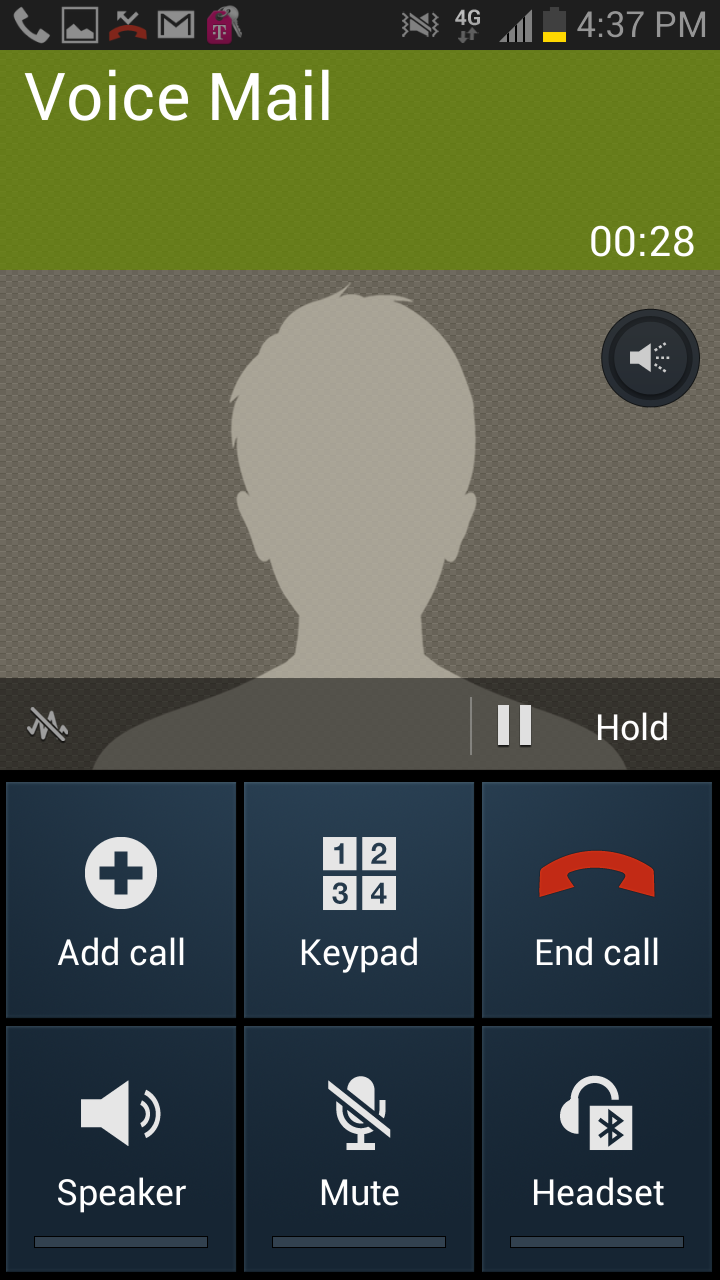
Active phone call on a Galaxy S3

The S III is powered by Android, a Linux-based, open source mobile operating system developed by Google and introduced commercially in 2008. Among other features, the software allows users to maintain customized home screens which can contain shortcuts to applications and widgets for displaying information. Four shortcuts to frequently used applications can be stored on a dock at the bottom of the screen; the button in the center of the dock opens the application drawer, which displays a menu containing all of the apps installed on the device. A tray accessed by dragging from the top of the screen allows users to view notifications received from other apps, and contains toggle switches for commonly used functions. Pre-loaded apps also provide access to Google's various services. The keyboard software is equipped with a clipboard manager.

The S III uses Samsung's proprietary TouchWiz graphical user interface (GUI). The "Nature" version used by the S III has a more "organic" feel than previous versions, and contains more interactive elements such as a water ripple effect on the precluded lock screen, to resemble its appearance in nature. There are a number of pre-installed system fonts: the Default font (Roboto), Choco cooky, Helvetica S, and Rosemary. To complement the TouchWiz interface, and as a competitor o Apple's Siri, the phone introduces S Voice, Samsung's intelligent personal assistant. S Voice can recognize eight languages including English, Korean, Italian and French. Based on Vlingo, S Voice enables the user to verbally control 20 functions such as playing a song, setting the alarm, or activating driving mode; it relies on Wolfram Alpha for online searches. With the Wake-up commands feature, voice commands can be set to launch apps and tasks out of stand-by mode, such as S Voice, camera, music player, voice recorder, missed calls, messages, and schedule. The Auto Haptic feature can complement audio with synchronous haptic feedback.

The precluded telephone application is equipped with additional options for noise cancellation, call holding, volume boosting, and the ability to personalize the call sound.

==== Gallery software ====
The new gallery software of the Galaxy S3 allows sorting photos and videos chronologically, by location, and by group. Photos with tagged faces can also be sorted by person.

The Spiral View feature was added with the Android Jelly Bean 4.1.2 update, which displays the thumbnails in a 3D spiral.

==== Video player ====
The precluded video player software is newly equipped with the ability to play videos in a floating pop-up that can be moved freely around the screen. In addition, the video player application can show motion thumbnails, which means that the preview thumbnails show a moving portion of the video.

==== Software updates ====
The S III initially shipped with Android version 4.0.4, named "Ice Cream Sandwich", which became commercially available in March 2012 with the Nexus S and Galaxy Nexus. Ice Cream Sandwich has a refined user interface, and expanded camera capabilities, security features and connectivity. In mid-June 2012, Google unveiled Android 4.1 "Jelly Bean", which employs Google Now, a voice-assistant similar to S Voice, and incorporates other software changes. Samsung accommodated Jelly Bean in the S III by making last-minute hardware changes to the phone in some markets. Jelly Bean updates began rolling out to S IIIs in selected European countries, and to the T-Mobile in the United States in November 2012. Samsung started pushing Android 4.1.2 Jelly Bean to the international version of the S III in December 2012.

This update shipped the so-called Premium Suite Upgrade which brought additional features to the Galaxy S3, such as split-screen app view as known from the Galaxy Note 2.

In December 2013, Samsung began rolling out Android 4.3 for the S III, adding user interface features backported from the Galaxy S4, and support for the Samsung Galaxy Gear smartwatch. In March 2014, Samsung started the rollout of 4.4.2 KitKat for the 2 GB variant of the S III.

The Galaxy S III is Samsung's first phone not to get new preloaded ringtones from software updates, a custom that is being continued to date.

==== Services ====
The S III comes with a multitude of pre-installed applications, including Google apps like Google Play, YouTube, Google+, Gmail, Google Maps, Voice Search and Calendar, in addition to Samsung-specific apps such as ChatON, Game Hub, Music Hub, Video Hub, Social Hub and Navigation. To address the fact that iPhone users are reluctant to switch to Android because the OS is not compatible with iTunes, from June 2012 Samsung offered customers of its Galaxy series the Easy Phone Sync app to enable the transfer of music, photos, videos, podcasts, and text messages from an iPhone to a Galaxy device. The user can access Google Play, a digital-distribution multimedia-content service exclusive to Android, to download applications, games, music, movies, books, magazines, and TV programs.

==== Interaction ====
Apart from S Voice, Samsung has directed the bulk of the S III's marketing campaign towards the device's "smart" features, which facilitate improved human-device interactivity. These features include: "Direct Call", the handset's ability to recognize when a user wants to talk to somebody instead of messaging them, if they bring the phone to their head; "Social Tag", a function that identifies and tags people in a photo and shares photos with them, "Smart Alert", a haptic feedback (short vibration) when the device detects being picked up after new notifications have arrived; and "Pop Up Play", which allows a video and other applications to occupy the screen at the same time. In addition, the S III can beam its screen to a monitor or be used as a remote controller (AllShare Cast and Play) and share photos with people who are tagged in them (Buddy Photo Share).

==== Multimedia ====
The S III can access and play traditional media formats such as music, movies, TV programs, audiobooks, and podcasts, and can sort its media library alphabetically by song title, artist, album, playlist, folder, and genre. One notable feature of the S III's music player is Music Square, which analyses a song's intensity and ranks the song by mood so that the user can play songs according to their current emotional state. The device also introduced Music Hub, an online music store powered by 7digital with a catalogue of over 19 million songs.

Its "Auto Haptic" feature vibrates synchronously to the audio output for intensification, similarly to the audio-coupled haptic effect, a feature added to stock Android in 2021.

==== Voice over LTE ====
The S III was the first smartphone to support Voice Over LTE with the introduction of HD Voice service in South Korea. The phone enables video calling with its 1.9 MP front-facing camera, and with support for the aptX codec, improves Bluetooth-headset connectivity. Texting on the S III does not embody any new significant features from the S II. Speech-to-text is aided by Vlingo and Google's voice-recognition assistant. Not unlike other Android devices, there is a multitude of third-party typing applications available that could complement the S III's stock keyboard.

==== Enterprise ====
On 18 June 2012, Samsung announced that the S III would have a version with enterprise software under the company's Samsung Approved For Enterprise (SAFE) program, an initiative facilitating the use of its devices for "bring your own device" scenarios in workplace environments. The enterprise S III version would support AES-256 bit encryption, VPN and Mobile Device Management functionality, and Microsoft Exchange ActiveSync. It was scheduled to be released in the United States in July 2012. The enterprise version was expected to penetrate the business market dominated by Research in Motion's BlackBerry, following the release of similar enterprise versions of the Galaxy Note, Galaxy S II and the Galaxy Tab line of tablet computers.

==== Developer edition ====
A separate "Developer Edition" of the S III was made available from Samsung's Developer Portal. It came with an unlockable bootloader to allow the user to modify the phone's software.

== Variants ==
Model	GT-I9300[T]	GT-I9305[N/T]	SHV-E210K/L/S	SGH-T999/L[v]	SGH-I747[m]	SGH-N064 (SC-06D)	SGH-N035 (SC-03E)	SCH-J021 (SCL21)	SCH-R530	SCH-I535	SCH-S960L	SCH-S968C	N/A	GT-I9308	SCH-I939	GT-I9301I (Galaxy S III Neo)
Countries	International		South Korea	Canada, United States		United States	Japan			United States				China	China, Taiwan	International
Carriers	International	International (LTE)	KT, LG U+, SK Telecom	Mobilicity, T-Mobile, MetroPCS, Wind, Videotron	AT&T, Bell, Rogers, Telus, Koodo, SaskTel, Virgin, Fido	AT&T	NTT DoCoMo		au	Cricket Wireless, U.S. Cellular, MetroPCS	Verizon	Sprint, Straight Talk, Net 10,	Straight Talk	China Mobile	China Telecom	International
2G	850, 900, 1800, 1900 MHz; GSM / GPRS / EDGE									850, 1900 MHz; CDMA		800, (Note: The Sprint version of the phone contains support for CDMA over ESMR 800, a band previously used by Sprint for its Nextel iDEN network.) 850, 1900 MHz; CDMA	?	900, 1800, 1900 MHz; GSM / GPRS / EDGE	800, 1900 MHz; CDMA900, 1800, 1,900 MHz; GSM / GPRS / EDGE	850, 900, 1800, 1900 MHz; GSM / GPRS / EDGE
3G	850, 900, 1900, 2100 MHz; UMTS / HSPA+ CDMA/EVDO Rev-A/Rev-B	WCDMA 850, 900, 2100 MHz; UMTS / HSPA+	850, 900, 1800, 1900, 2100 MHz; UMTS / HSPA+ CDMA/EVDO Rev-A/Rev-B	850, AWS (Band IV), 1900, 2100 MHz; UMTS / HSPA+ / DC-HSPA+	850, 1900, 2100 MHz; UMTS / HSPA+	HSDPA 850 / 1900 / 2100	800, 1700 (Band IX), 2100 MHz; UMTS / HSPA+		CDMA2000 1xEV-DO Rev-A; 800 MHz, 2100 MHz	CDMA2000 1xEV-DO Rev-A			850/1900 MHz EVDO	1880, 2010 MHz; TD-SCDMA	CDMA2000 1xEV-DO Rev-A; 2100 MHz; WCDMA	850, 900, 1900, 2100 MHz; UMTS / HSPA+
4G LTE	No	GT-I9305: 800, 1800, 2600 MHz; GT-I9305N: 900, 1800, 2600 MHz; GT-I9305T: 1800, 2600 MHz	SHV-E210K: 900, 1800 MHz; SHV-E210L: 850, 2100 MHz; SHV-E210S: 800 MHz	T999L Model Only: 700 (Band 17); 1700 (Band 4) MHz	700 (Band 17), 1700 (AWS) MHz	Band 4 and Band 17	2100 MHz		1500(Band 11), 800(Band 18)	700 (Band 12), 1700 (AWS) MHz	700 (Band 13) MHz	1900 (Band 25) MHz	No			
Max network speed	21 Mbit/s HSPA+	100 Mbit/s LTE		42 Mbit/s DC-HSPA+ T999L Model Only: 100 Mbit/s LTE	100 Mbit/s LTE	?	75 Mbit/s LTE	100 Mbit/s LTE	75 Mbit/s LTE	100 Mbit/s LTE			N/A	2.8 Mbit/s TD HSDPA	N/A	21 Mbit/s HSPA+
Broadcast receiver	FM radio	No	T-DMB	No			1seg									FM radio
Dimensions	136.6 mm × 70.6 mm × 8.6 mm (5.38 in × 2.78 in × 0.34 in)		136.6 mm × 70.6 mm × 9.0 mm (5.38 in × 2.78 in × 0.35 in)	136.6 mm × 70.7 mm × 8.6 mm (5.38 in × 2.78 in × 0.34 in)		132.6 mm × 69.3 mm × 9.1 mm (5.22 in × 2.73 in × 0.36 in)	137 mm × 71 mm × 9 mm (5.39 in × 2.80 in × 0.35 in)		139 mm × 71 mm × 9.4 mm (5.47 in × 2.80 in × 0.37 in)	136.6 mm × 70.7 mm × 8.6 mm (5.38 in × 2.78 in × 0.34 in)					136.6 mm × 70.6 mm × 8.99 mm (5.38 in × 2.78 in × 0.35 in)	136.6 mm × 70.6 mm × 8.6 mm (5.38 in × 2.78 in × 0.34 in)
Weight	133 g (4.7 oz)		138.5 g (4.89 oz)	133 g (4.7 oz)		136 g (4.8 oz)	139 g (4.9 oz)		141 g (5.0 oz)	133 g (4.7 oz)					141 g (5.0 oz)	133 g (4.7 oz)
Operating system	Android 4.0.4 with TouchWiz "Nature UX" graphical user interface	Android 4.1.1 with TouchWiz "Nature UX" graphical user interface (OTA upgrade to 4.4.4 available)				Android 4.0 (Ice Cream Sandwich), upgradable to 4.1 (Jelly Bean)	Android 4.0.4 with TouchWiz "Nature UX" graphical user interface	Android 4.1.1 with TouchWiz "Nature UX" graphical user interface	Android 4.0.4 (or Android 4.1.2 on Straight Talk), with TouchWiz "Nature UX" graphical user interface (OTA upgrade to 4.3 available, and now shipping with 4.3)					Android 4.0.4 with TouchWiz "Nature UX" graphical user interface		Android 4.4.2 with TouchWiz "Nature UX 2.0" graphical user interface
SoC	Samsung Exynos 4 Quad (Exynos 4412)			Qualcomm Snapdragon S4 MSM8960				Samsung Exynos 4 Quad (Exynos 4412)	Qualcomm Snapdragon S4 MSM8960					Samsung Exynos 4 Quad (Exynos 4412)		Qualcomm Snapdragon 400 MSM8228
CPU	1.4 GHz quad-core ARM Cortex-A9			1.5 GHz dual-core Qualcomm Krait				1.6 GHz quad-core ARM Cortex-A9	1.5 GHz dual-core Qualcomm Krait					1.4 GHz quad-core ARM Cortex-A9		1.4 GHz quad-core ARM Cortex-A7
GPU	ARM Mali-400 MP4			Qualcomm Adreno 225				ARM Mali-400 MP4	Qualcomm Adreno 225					ARM Mali-400 MP4		Qualcomm Adreno 305
RAM	1 GB	2 GB				1 GB	2 GB							1 GB		1.5 GB
Storage	16/32/64 GB	16/32 GB	16/32/64 GB	16/32 GB		8 GB	32 GB			16/32 GB			16 GB			
Mobile High-Definition Link (MHL) support	yes		unknown													no
Miracast (screen mirroring) support	yes		unknown													no

== Issues ==
On 19 September 2012, security researchers demonstrated during Pwn2Own, a computer hacking contest held in Amsterdam, Netherlands, that the S III can be hacked via NFC, allowing attackers to download all data from the phone.

In December 2012, two hardware issues were reported by users of the S III: A vulnerability of the Exynos SoC allowed malicious apps to gain root privileges even on unrooted devices, and a spontaneous bricking of the unit, called the "sudden death vulnerability", that occurs about six months after activation. This issue was caused by the eMMC (type VTU00M) failing due to bugs. Samsung has replaced the mainboards of affected units under warranty. In January 2013, Samsung released a firmware update that corrected both issues.

Affecting both Galaxy S II and III, some units can have high memory use without apparent cause, in itself causing units to be unable to store any more data and making the unit's memory 'full' when apparently not using all of the unit's internal memory available. In October 2012 Samsung noted that this was caused by a mass caching archive running in the background of units' operational tasks. This copied and saved media, tasks, and app information to a background archive which was not accessible to the user without changing and rewriting the phone's operational script. When this has been altered access can be gained and the cache can be deleted and no further caching will occur unless requested. This issue was resolved for the Galaxy S III (and later) model.

As of mid-2013, two S III explosions were reported. The first involved a man from Ireland, while the more recent incident occurred when a Swiss teenager was left with second and third-degree burns on her thigh caused by her phone's explosion.

In October 2013, Samsung acknowledged swelling and overheating issues with the Li-ion batteries in some S III phones, and offered replacement batteries for affected devices.

In 2014, with the rollout of Android 4.4.2 "KitKat", Samsung confirmed the update for the Galaxy S3, however the company eventually stated that due to the 1GB of RAM, the update would not happen. This only affected the GT-I9300 model, as other models got the update, including the Neo variant. It was later found by developers, that Samsung's TouchWiz interface was more "bloated" and was greater in size than the system partitions.

== Reception ==
=== Commercial reception ===
According to an anonymous Samsung official speaking to the Korea Economic Daily, the S III received more than 9 million pre-orders from 100 carriers during the two weeks following its London unveiling, making it the fastest-selling gadget in history. In comparison, the iPhone 4S received 4 million pre-orders prior to its launch, while Samsung's previous flagship phone, the S II, had 10 million handsets shipped within five months. Within a month of the London unveiling, auction and shopping website eBay noted a 119-percent increase in second-hand Android phone sales. According to an eBay spokesperson, this was "the first time anything other than an Apple product has sparked such a selling frenzy."

The S III was released in 28 countries in Europe and the Middle East on 29 May 2012. To showcase its flagship device, Samsung afterwards embarked on a global month-long tour of the S III to nine cities, including Sydney, New Delhi, and cities in China, Japan, South Korea and the United States.

The S III has helped Samsung consolidate its market share in several countries including India, where Samsung expected to capture 60 percent of the country's smartphone market, improving on its previous 46 percent. Within a month of release, Samsung had a 60-percent market share in France, while the company controlled over 50 percent of the German and Italian smartphone markets. Over a similar period the S III helped increase Samsung's market share in the United Kingdom to over 40 percent, while eroding the iPhone 4S's 25 percent to 20 percent in the country. The S III was scheduled to be released in North America on 20 June 2012, but because of high demand, some US and Canadian carriers delayed the release by several days, while some other carriers limited the market at launch. The S III's US launch event took place in New York City, hosted by Twilight actress Ashley Greene and attended by dubstep artist Skrillex, who performed at Skylight Studios.

Samsung estimated that by the end of July 2012, the S III would have been released by 296 carriers in 145 countries, and that more than 10 million handsets would have been sold. Shin Jong-kyun, president of Samsung's mobile communications sector, announced on 22 July that sales had exceeded 10 million. According to an assessment by Swiss financial services company UBS, Samsung had shipped 5–6 million units of the phone in the second quarter of 2012 and would ship 10–12 million handsets per quarter throughout the rest of the year. An even more aggressive prediction by Paris-based banking group BNP Paribas said 15 million units will be shipped in the third quarter of 2012, while Japanese financial consultant company Nomura placed the figure for this quarter as high as 18 million. Sales of the S III were estimated to top 40 million by the end of the year. To meet demand, Samsung had hired 75,000 workers, and its South Korean factory was running at its peak capacity of 5 million smartphone units per month. A manufacturing flaw resulted in a large portion of the new smartphones having irregularities with the "hyper-glazing" process. The mistake caused an undesirable finish on the blue back covers and resulted in the disposal of up to 600,000 plastic casings and a shortage of the blue model. The issue was later resolved; however, Reuters estimated that the shortage had cost Samsung two million S III sales during its first month of release.

On 6 September 2012, Samsung revealed that sales of the S III had reached 20 million in 100 days, making it three and six times faster-selling than the Galaxy S II and the Galaxy S, respectively. Europe accounted for more than 25 percent of this figure with 6 million units, followed by Asia (4.5 million) and the US (4 million); sales in South Korea, the S III's home market, numbered 2.5 million. Around the same time of Samsung's announcement, sales of the S III surpassed that of the iPhone 4S in the US.

In the third quarter of 2012, more than 18 million S III units were shipped, making it the most popular smartphone at the time, ahead of the iPhone 4S's 16.2 million units. Analysts deduced that the slump in iPhone sales was due to customers' anticipation of the iPhone 5.

By May 2014, the S III had sold approximately 60 million units since its 2012 release. In April 2015, the total sales number was reported as 70 million.

On 11 October 2012 Samsung unveiled the Galaxy S III Mini, a 4-inch (100 mm) smartphone with lower specifications compared to the S III.

=== Critical reception ===
The reception of the S III has been particularly positive. Critics noted the phone's blend of features, such as its S Voice application, display, processing speed, and dimensions as having an edge over its competition, the Apple iPhone 4S and HTC One X. Vlad Savov of The Verge declared it a "technological triumph", while Natasha Lomas of CNET UK lauded the phone's "impossibly slim and light casing and a quad-core engine", calling it the "Ferrari of Android phones", a sentiment affirmed ("a prince among Android phones") by Dave Oliver of Wired UK and ("king of Android") Esat Dedezade of Stuff magazine. Gareth Beavis of TechRadar described the S III as "all about faster, smarter and being more minimal than ever before while keeping the spec list at the bleeding edge of technology." Matt Warman of The Daily Telegraph said, "On spending just a short time with the S3, I'm confident in saying that it's a worthy successor to the globally popular S2".

Upon release, a number of critics and publications have made references to the S III, Samsung's 2012 flagship phone, as an "iPhone killer", responding perhaps to Apple's favourable customer perception. The label owes itself to the S III's use of the Android OS—the chief rival of Apple's iOS—as well as its design and features that rival the iPhone 4S such as Smart Stay, a large display, a quad-core processor, Android customizability, and a multitude of connectivity options.

The S III was the first Android phone to have a higher launch price than the iPhone 4S when the Apple product was released in 2011. With the S III, Tim Weber, business editor of the BBC, observed, "With the new Galaxy S3 they [Samsung] have clearly managed to move to the front of the smartphone field, ahead of mighty Apple itself."

Conversely, reviewers have opined on the design and feel of phone, calling its polycarbonate shell "cheap" and having a "slippery feel". The S Voice was described as "not optimised" and "more rigid than Siri" with its poor voice-recognition accuracy, with instances when it would not respond at all. Another usage problem was a microphone malfunction that resulted in difficulty communicating during a call. Reviewers have noted the somewhat abrupt auto-adjustment of display brightness, which tends to under-illuminate the screen; (Note: Samsung has since released an over-the-air update that includes a brightness slider.) however, it has twice the battery life compared to the HTC handset, achieved partly through the dim display. (Note: The test was performed with the quad-core versions of the two phones performing continuous video playback until battery is depleted.) Others say the numerous pre-installed apps make the S III feel "bloated". (Note: Others were more positive about the multitude of applications.)

In late-September 2012 TechRadar ranked it as the No. 1 handset in its constantly updated list of the 20 best mobile phones; Stuff magazine also ranked it at No. 1 in its list of 10 best smartphones in May 2012. The S III won an award from the European Imaging and Sound Association under the category of "European Mobile Phone" of 2012–2013. In 2012, the S III won T3's "Phone of the Year" award, beating the iPhone 4S, the Nokia Lumia 900, the Sony Xperia S and others and was voted Phone of the Year by readers of tech website S21. In February 2013, the S III won the "Best Smartphone" award from the GSMA at Mobile World Congress.

== Litigation ==
On 5 June 2012, Apple filed for preliminary injunctions in the United States District Court for the Northern District of California against Samsung Electronics, claiming the S III had violated at least two of the company's patents. Apple requested that the court include the phone in its existing legal battle against Samsung, and ban sales of the S III before its scheduled 21 June 2012 US launch. Apple claimed the alleged infringements would "cause immediate and irreparable harm" to its commercial interest. Samsung responded by declaring it would "vigorously oppose the request and demonstrate to the court that the Galaxy S3 [sic] is innovative and distinctive", and reassured the public that the 21 June release would proceed as planned. On 11 June, Judge Lucy Koh said that Apple's claim would overload her work schedule, as she would also be overseeing the trial of Samsung's other devices; consequently, Apple dropped its request to block 21 June release of the S III.

In mid-July 2012, Samsung removed the universal search feature on Sprint and AT&T S III phones with over-the-air (OTA) software updates to disable the local search function as a "precautionary measure" before its patent court trial with Apple, which began on 30 July 2012. Although Apple won the trial, the S III experienced a sales spike because of the public's belief that the phone would be banned. On 31 August 2012, Apple asked the same federal court to add the S III into its existing complaint, believing the device has violated its patents. Samsung countered with the statement: "Apple continues to resort to litigation over market competition in an effort to limit consumer choice."

== See also ==
- Comparison of Samsung Galaxy S smartphones
- Samsung Galaxy S III Progre
- Samsung Galaxy S series
- Samsung Ativ S

== Notes ==
Preceded by Samsung Galaxy S II	Samsung Galaxy S III; 2012	Succeeded by Samsung Galaxy S4
