= Samsung Galaxy S III Mini =

Android smartphone

Samsung Galaxy S III Mini (or Samsung Galaxy S3 Mini)
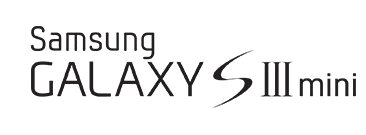

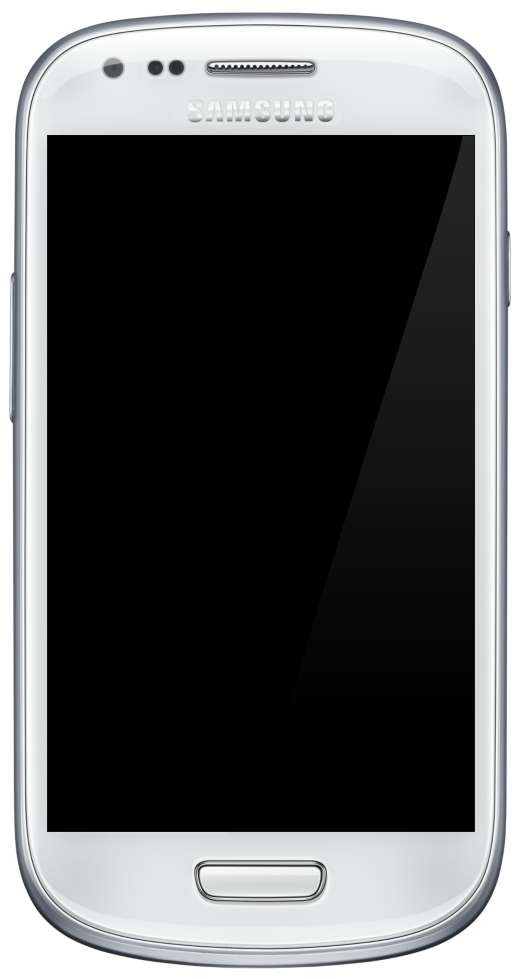
- (available in blue, white, black, gray, red, brown)
- Manufacturer: Samsung Electronics
- Type: Touchscreen smartphone
- Series: Galaxy
- First released: October 2012; 14 years ago
- Predecessor: Samsung Galaxy W and Galaxy Mini 2
- Successor: Samsung Galaxy S4 Mini
- Compatible networks: 2G: GSM 850/900/1800/1900 MHz; 3G: HSDPA 900/1900/2100 MHz; 3.5G: GSM 850/900/1800/1900 MHz, CDMA2000 800, 1900 MHz (Verizon Variant)
- Dimensions: 121.55×63×9.9 mm (4.785×2.480×0.390 in)
- Weight: 120 g (4.2 oz)
- Operating system: Original: Android 4.1.1 "Jelly Bean"; Current: Android 4.1.2 "Jelly Bean"; Android 4.4.2 "KitKat" (AT&T and Verizon Wireless Galaxy S3 Mini only) Android 4.2.2 "Jelly Bean" (i8200 models only); Unofficial: Android 7.1.2 "Nougat" via LineageOS 14.1
- System-on-chip: ST-Ericsson NovaThor U8500 (GT-I8190); Marvell PXA986 (GT-I8200)
- CPU: 1 GHz dual-core ARM Cortex-A9 (GT-I8190); 1.2 GHz dual-core ARM Cortex-A9 (GT-I8200); 1.2 GHz dual-core Krait (North American variant)
- GPU: ARM Mali-400 MP1 (GT-I8190); Vivante GC1000 (GT-I8200); Adreno 305 (North American variant)
- Memory: 1 GB RAM
- Storage: 8 / 16 flash (3.5 GB not available due to Android software and preinstalled apps)
- Removable storage: microSD, up to 32 GB
- Battery: 1500 mAh – two versions: 3-pin & 4-pin & 2000 mAh (U.S. and Canada)
- Rear camera: 5 Mpx with auto focus, 720p 30 fps HD video recording (at 12 Mbit/s, 128 kbit/s audio), single LED flash
- Front camera: VGA
- Display: 4 in (100 mm) Super AMOLED PenTile 480×800 resolution (~233 PPI)
- Connectivity: 3.5 mm TRRS, HSPA, Bluetooth 4.0+LE, Wi-Fi & Hotspot, DLNA, Kies Air, micro USB 2.0, NFC (GT-I8190N/GT-I8200N/SM-G730A/SM-G730V only)
- Data inputs: Capacitive Glass, headset controls, proximity sensor, 3-axis gyroscope, magnetometer, accelerometer, aGPS, and Glonass
- Model: GT-I8190/N
- Codename: Golden

The Samsung Galaxy S III Mini (stylized as Samsung GALAXY S III mini, model number: GT-I8190) is a touchscreen-based, slate-sized smartphone designed and manufactured by Samsung. It was announced in October 2012 and released in November 2012. The Galaxy S III Mini technological specifications include a 4-inch Super AMOLED display, a dual-core processor running at 1 GHz with 1 GB of RAM, a 5-megapixel rear camera, and a front-facing VGA camera for video calls or selfies. It is the first major release in the Samsung Galaxy S "mini" line, and was designed to be the successor of the Galaxy W and the Galaxy Mini 2.

Samsung Galaxy S III Mini is a smaller version of the Samsung Galaxy S III and contains many of the same features; however, it lacks an 8-megapixel rear camera, bigger 4.8-inch screen and Gorilla Glass display. This device has a 42 h endurance rating. The device initially ran on Android 4.1.1 (Jelly Bean) but has now been updated to 4.1.2. Other features include Samsung's TouchWiz Skin, ChatON instant messaging, Smart alert, Buddy Photo Share, Pop-Up Play, S Suggest, S Voice, Smart Stay, Video Hub, Game Hub 2.0, and the S Beam technology (S Beam only available on special NFC edition, GT-I8190N). This device's battery varies from different carriers, and it will either have a 3-pin battery, which is widely used and sold, or a 4-pin battery.

== Other variants ==
An alternative 'upgraded' Galaxy S III Mini version (SM-G730A/SM-G730V) is available from the US carriers AT&T and Verizon Wireless respectively, which features a different processor (Qualcomm 1.2 GHz dual-core Snapdragon 400), NFC, 2000 mAh battery, and 4G LTE data speeds, among other differences. It retains the same 4-inch (800×480 pixels), Super AMOLED screen as the original 'international' Galaxy S III Mini. As of June 6, 2014, the AT&T website shows this version of the phone shipping with Android 4.4 KitKat installed.

In March 2014, another variant of this device (GT-I8200) was released in some countries, with the GT-I8200N model featuring NFC and the GT-I8200L model in Latin America. This variant features a different SoC (Marvell PXA986, dual-core) clocked at 1.2 GHz, with the Vivante GC1000 GPU, those specs were used in the Galaxy Tab 3 7.0 as well. The GT-I8200/N/L variants are shipped with Android 4.2.2 Jelly Bean out of the box, as opposed to the older GT-I8190 variant which was shipped with 4.1.1.

== Successor ==
The successor to the Galaxy S III Mini is the Galaxy S4 Mini. It was announced on May 30, 2013, and was subsequently released in July 2013.

== See also ==
- Comparison of Samsung Galaxy S smartphones
- Samsung Galaxy S series
