= Quick Share =

Data transfer program by Samsung and Google

- Logo used since January 2024

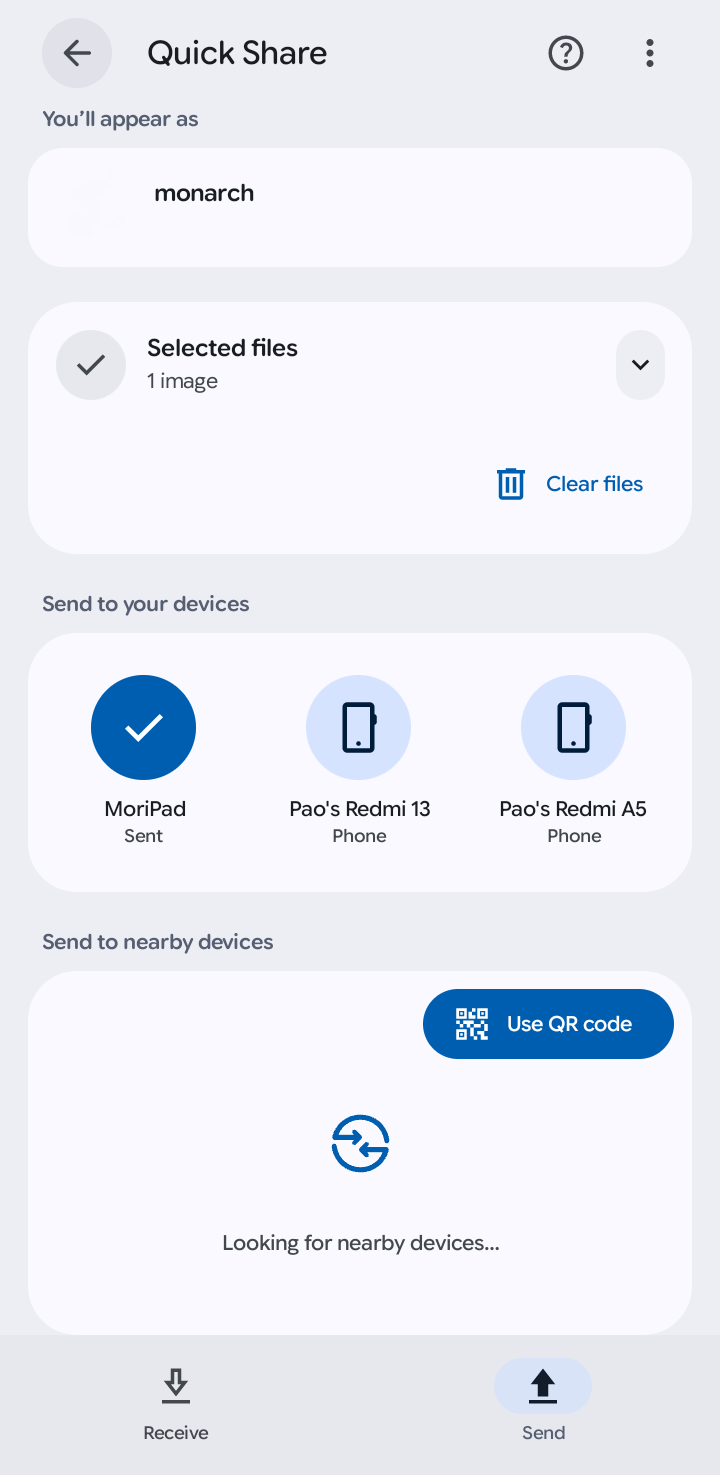
- Quick Share running on Android after sending a file to a PC
- Developers: Samsung Electronics; Google LLC
- Release: February 24, 2020; 6 years ago
- Operating system: Android 6.0 and later; Android XR; ChromeOS 91 and later; Windows 10 (version 2004) and later
- Predecessor: Nearby Share
- Type: Utility software
- License: Proprietary
- Website: Google App

Quick Share is a wireless peer-to-peer data transfer service for Android, ChromeOS and Windows. Originally developed by Samsung Electronics for its own devices, Google subsequently collaborated with Samsung and merged its own Nearby Share into Quick Share in 2024, distributing Quick Share to non-Galaxy Android devices through Google Play Services and releasing a Windows app for non-Galaxy PCs.

Quick Share utilizes Bluetooth and Wi-Fi Direct to send files to nearby devices. Samsung devices can send to distant recipients through the Samsung Cloud.

== History ==
Quick Share debuted in 2020 along with the Samsung Galaxy S20 and One UI 2.1, with rollout to other Galaxy smartphones and tablets later. Samsung claims the service was created to streamline the process of sending content, superseding a previous service named Link Sharing. Quick Share for Windows-based Samsung Galaxy Book notebooks only was launched in 2021, available from the Microsoft Store.

In January 2024, Google and Samsung announced that Samsung's existing Quick Share implementation would be unified with Google's Nearby Share under the Quick Share brand, with the goal of providing a single, system-level sharing experience across Android phones, ChromeOS devices, and compatible Windows PCs.

In November, extended, that implemented interoperability of phones.

== Usage ==
Users can send files to up to 8 nearby devices at a time, so long as they have the feature enabled and their screens are on. Quick Share can be toggled in the quick panel settings and the user can choose to receive content from anyone nearby, contacts only, your devices, or no one. Content transfer is made possible by choosing Quick Share, after which the sender chooses which nearby device(s) to send to.

Quick Share can upload files to Samsung Cloud and sharing via URL. The data uploaded to the Samsung Cloud can be downloaded by the user either by clicking the specified link or scanning the provided QR code. Uploaded files are limited to 10 gigabytes in size, and can remain in Samsung Cloud for a maximum of two days.

The Quick Share app on Windows enables other Quick Share-enabled devices to share files with Windows devices.

When sharing with an Apple device running iOS, iPadOS, macOS, or visionOS, AirDrop must be set to allow receiving from everyone.

== Availability ==
Quick Share is available on Android 6 and later, ChromeOS 91 and later, and 64-bit versions of Windows 10 and later (or Windows 11 on ARM).

The Quick Share function is part of the Android and ChromeOS operating systems. A Windows program can be downloaded and installed, requiring both Bluetooth and Wi-Fi support. Unofficial clients exist for Linux and macOS.

=== Quick Share for Windows ===
There are two official apps for Windows available:

- Samsung develops a client intended for Samsung Galaxy Book PCs only, available from the Microsoft Store;
- Google distributes another client for any non-Samsung computer running Microsoft Windows.

== Technology ==
Quick Share is built on a combination of short-range discovery and higher-bandwidth Wi-Fi transports. On Android devices, the service uses Bluetooth or Bluetooth Low Energy for initial discovery and authentication, then establishes a direct Wi-Fi link between devices for the actual data transfer, similar to the approach previously used by Nearby Share.

Internally, Quick Share relies on standard Wi-Fi technologies such as Wi-Fi Direct and Wi-Fi Aware (Neighbor Awareness Networking) on devices and chipsets that support them, allowing devices to discover one another and exchange data without a traditional access point. Android added platform-level support for Wi-Fi Aware in Android 8.0 “Oreo”, and many newer devices expose these capabilities to applications through the Wi-Fi Aware APIs.

== Private Share ==
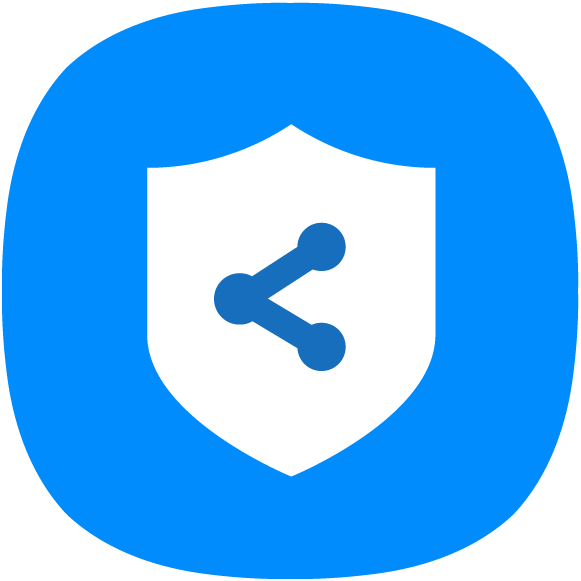
Private Share icon

Private Share was a derivative data transfer service which used blockchain encryption, designed for important personal or financial information. Sharing files is possible via the phone number associated with a phone's SIM card, or a user-chosen private number. A private number is exclusive to the Private Share app, and commences with # and includes 10 digits, like #0123456789. The sender is able to set an expiry date for the files, which get automatically deleted from the recipient's devices. There is a 200 megabyte upload limit for senders. Like Quick Share, Private Share is also preloaded on Samsung Galaxy devices. Since December 2023, Private Share has been integrated with Quick Share, and is no longer a separate service.

== See also ==
- AirDrop, a similar feature by Apple with partial Quick Share support
- Phone Link, a function by Microsoft to share between Windows PCs and smartphones
- Wi-Fi Direct
- Wi-Fi Aware
