= AirDrop =

Proprietary file sharing between Apple devices

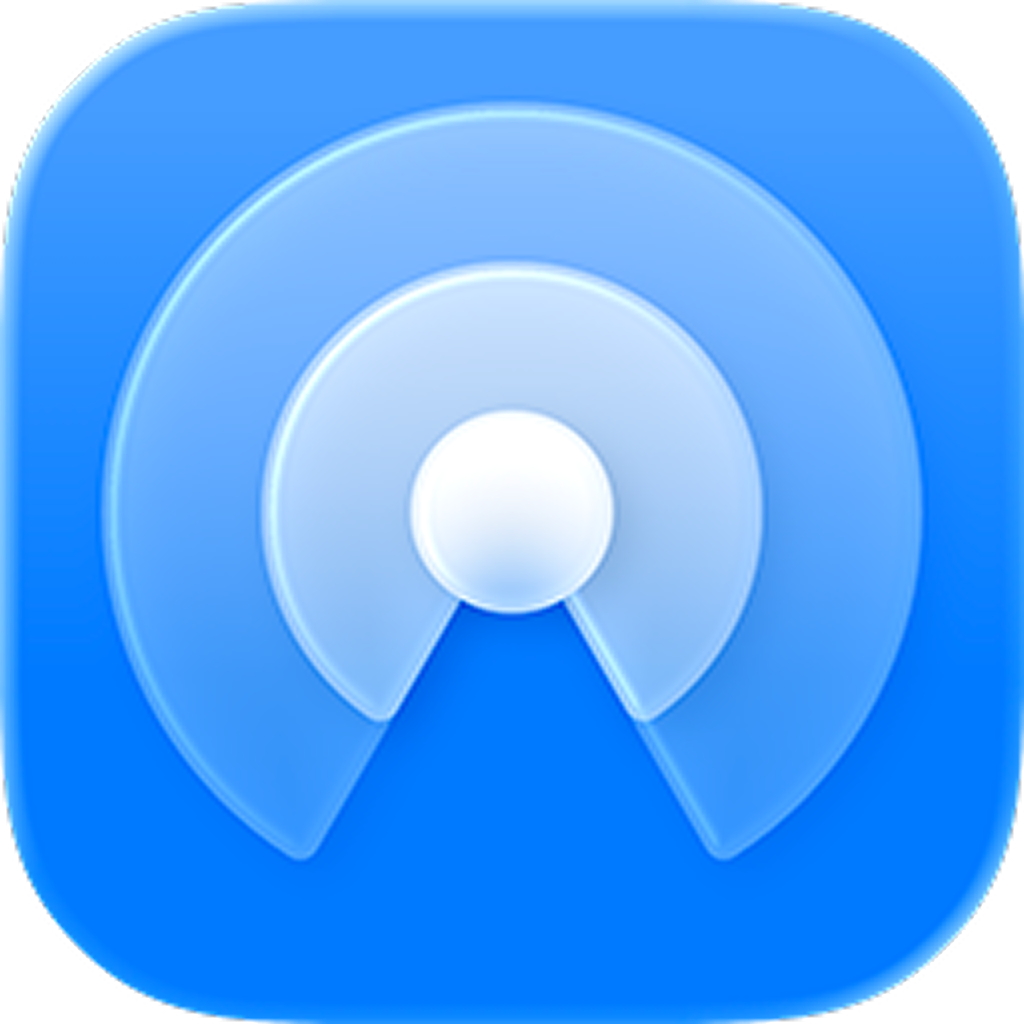

- AirDrop on macOS
- Developer: Apple Inc.
- Release: July 20, 2011; 15 years ago
- Operating system: iOS, iPadOS, macOS, and visionOS
- Platform: Mac, iPhone, iPad, iPod Touch, and Vision Pro
- Type: Utility software
- License: Bundled proprietary software
- Website: AirDrop on iOS and iPadOS; AirDrop on macOS

AirDrop is a file-sharing service in Apple's iOS, macOS, iPadOS and visionOS operating systems that operates over a wireless ad hoc network. Lightning to USB-C cable, can use wired AirDrop. AirDrop was introduced in Mac OS X Lion (10.7) and iOS 7, and can transfer files among supported Apple devices by means of close-range wireless communication. There is no limit on the size of files that can be transferred. This communication takes place over Apple Wireless Direct Link (AWDL) "Action Frames" and "Data Frames" using generated link-local IPv6 addresses instead of the Wi-Fi chip's fixed MAC address. In November 2025, Quick Share added limited AirDrop support in Android, starting with Pixel 10 phones.

Prior to OS X Yosemite (10.10), and under OS X Lion, Mountain Lion, and Mavericks (10.7–10.9, respectively) the AirDrop protocol in macOS was different from the AirDrop protocol of iOS, and the two were therefore not interoperable. OS X Yosemite and later support the iOS AirDrop protocol on Macs released in 2012 and later, which is used for transfers between a Mac and an iOS device, as well as between Macs, which use both Wi-Fi and Bluetooth. Legacy mode for the original AirDrop protocol (which only uses Wi-Fi), which was used by Macs introduced in 2011 or earlier (or Macs released after 2012 running an operating system earlier than Yosemite) was supported through macOS Mojave and removed in macOS Catalina.

== Routine ==
=== iOS ===
On iOS 7 and later, AirDrop can be accessed by either tapping on Settings > General > AirDrop, or via the Control Center. Both Wi-Fi and Bluetooth are automatically switched on when AirDrop is enabled as they are both utilized. NFC can also be utilized to initiate a transfer in iOS 17 or later. Options for controlling AirDrop discovery by other devices include:

- No one can see the device (AirDrop disabled)
- Only contacts can see the device
- Everyone can see the device for 10 minutes (required for Android support)

In iOS 16.2 or later, the Everyone option reverts to Contacts Only after 10 minutes.

If an application implements AirDrop support, it is available through the share button. AirDrop is subject to a number of restrictions on iOS, such as the inability to share music or videos from the native apps.

=== macOS ===
On Macs running OS X 10.7 and greater, AirDrop is available in the Finder window sidebar. On Macs running OS X 10.8.1 or later, it can also be accessed through the menu option Go → AirDrop or by pressing ⇧ Shift+⌘ Cmd+R.

AirDrop must be selected in a Finder window sidebar to be able to transfer files. Furthermore, files are not automatically accepted, but instead give a prompt asking to receive or decline the file sent.

== System limitations ==
=== Transfer between two iOS devices ===
Running iOS 7 or later:

- iPhone 5 or newer
- iPod Touch (5th generation) or newer
- iPad (4th generation) or newer
- iPad Air: all models
- iPad Pro: all models
- iPad Mini: all models

AirDrop can be enabled unofficially on iPad (3rd generation) by jailbreaking the device and installing "AirDrop Enabler 7.0+" from Cydia. This procedure is not endorsed by Apple.

=== Transfer between two Mac computers ===
Running OS X Yosemite (10.10) or later:

- MacBook Air: Mid 2012 or newer
- MacBook (Retina): all models
- MacBook Pro: Mid 2012 or newer
- MacBook Neo: all models
- iMac: Late 2012 or newer
- iMac Pro: all models
- Mac Mini: Late 2012 or newer
- Mac Pro: Late 2013 or newer
- Mac Studio: all models

=== Transfer between a Mac and an iOS device ===
To transfer files between a Mac and an iPhone, iPad or iPod touch, the following minimum requirements have to be met: All iOS devices with AirDrop are supported with iOS 8 or later:

Running OS X Yosemite (10.10) or later:

- MacBook Air: Mid 2012 or newer
- MacBook (Retina): all models
- MacBook Pro: Mid 2012 or newer
- MacBook Neo: all models
- iMac: Late 2012 or newer
- iMac Pro: all models
- Mac Mini: Late 2012 or newer
- Mac Pro: Late 2013 or newer
- Mac Studio: all models

Bluetooth and Wi-Fi have to be turned on for both Mac and iOS devices. (Both devices are not required to be connected to the same Wi-Fi network.)

=== Transfer between an Apple device and select Androids ===
In November 2025, Google implemented AirDrop support for Quick Share on Android, starting with the Pixel 10 series. When transferring files between an iPhone and an Android device, the iPhone must be running iOS 26 or later. On the Apple device, AirDrop must be set to “everyone for 10 minutes” mode. On Android, the Quick Share extension app is required to have compatibility with AirDrop. Other Android devices that currently support AirDrop include the Samsung Galaxy S26 series and the Oppo Find X9 series, with more devices to follow.

== Security, privacy and reverse engineering ==
AirDrop uses TLS encryption over a direct Apple-created peer-to-peer Wi-Fi connection for transferring files. The Wi-Fi radios of the source and target devices communicate directly without using an Internet connection or wireless access point.

The technical details of AirDrop and the proprietary peer-to-peer Wi-Fi protocol called Apple Wireless Direct Link (AWDL) have been reverse engineered and the resulting open source implementations published as OWL and OpenDrop. In 2026, another open-source implementation, Owly, was released, supporting a broader range of Wi-Fi hardware, including certain Intel and MediaTek chipsets.

During the initial handshake, devices exchange full SHA-256 hashes of users' phone numbers and email addresses, which might be used by attackers to infer the phone numbers and in some cases email addresses themselves. In 2024, the Beijing Municipal Bureau of Justice claimed that following complaints from the public about "anonymous dissemination of inappropriate messages" in public places using AirDrop, a forensic institute in Beijing was commissioned to analyze iPhone's encrypted device logs. A rainbow table correlating phone numbers and email accounts was created during investigation, and has "effectively assisted the police in identifying several suspects" involved in such cases.

Researchers at the Technische Universität Darmstadt stated that Apple knew that AirDrop users could be identified and tracked as early as 2019 and did not implement a proposed fix in 2021.

In IOS 26, EU regulators required Apple to deprecate AWDL in favor of the open Wi-Fi Aware standard.

== Use in protests ==
Following the 2022 Beijing Sitong Bridge protest, users in China used AirDrop to distribute similar protest posters and slogans. Apple reportedly limited the AirDrop function in China just weeks before 2022 COVID-19 protests in China. The AirDrop restrictions triggered a hunger strike at Apple's headquarters.

== Incidents ==
There have been numerous reported cases where iOS device users with AirDrop privacy set to "Everyone" have received unwanted files from nearby strangers; the phenomenon has been termed "cyber-flashing." From iOS 16.1.1, Apple replaced the "Everyone" mode with "Everyone for 10 minutes" for users in China at first, which automatically reverts to contacts only after time elapses. After it was discovered, Apple stated that this feature was intended to reduce unsolicited content, and became available worldwide with iOS 16.2. It did not comment upon the timing of the change or why it is initially limited to China, with reports suggesting that the limitation was implemented due to the Beijing Sitong Bridge protest.

In March 2022 a flight between Seattle and Orlando was detained on the runway at Orlando International Airport until police decided a hijack threat was "not credible", after a 10-year-old child on board the plane airdropped a threat to another passenger, who alerted the crew.

In May 2022, an AnadoluJet flight between Israel and Turkey was deboarded after Israeli users used AirDrop to share pictures of a Turkish airline crash, leading to at least one injury to a passenger. After a search of the luggage, the flight was reboarded and resumed its trip some hours later.

In July 2022, an 18-year-old Spanish man flying from Rome to Alicante airdropped pictures of skulls and a generic message in Amharic to some of the passengers, before takeoff. As the crew was informed and the captain asked for police intervention, the flight left with a two-hour delay and the young man was charged with false alarm.

In late August 2022, a man on an airplane that was taxiing for take off airdropped nude photos of himself to others on the Southwest Airlines flight from Houston to Cabo San Lucas. When a passenger reported this to the flight crew, the pilot announced that if this did not stop he would return to the gate, which would ruin their vacations, and the activity stopped.

== See also ==
- Bluejacking – Sending of unsolicited messages over Bluetooth to Bluetooth-enabled devices
- Quick Share, a similar file transfer service for Android devices by Samsung and Google with limited AirDrop support
- Wi-Fi Direct, a similar technology
- Zapya, a free proprietary file transfer over Wi-Fi app
- AirPlay, sending/streaming media contents to other Apple devices
